= List of places in Nottinghamshire =

This is a list of settlements in the ceremonial county of Nottinghamshire, England.

== A ==
Alverton, Annesley, Annesley Woodhouse, Arnold, Askham, Aslockton, Aspley, Attenborough, Averham, Awsworth

== B ==
Babbington, Babworth, Bagthorpe, Bakersfield, Balderton, Barnby in the Willows, Barnstone, Barton in Fabis, Bassingfield, Bathley, Beauvale Newthorpe, Beckingham, Beeston, Besthorpe, Bestwood Village, Bevercotes, Bilborough, Bilby, Bilsthorpe, Bilsthorpe Moor, Bingham, Bircotes, Bleasby, Blidworth, Blidworth Bottoms, Blyth, Bole, Bolham, Bothamsall, Boughton, Bracebridge, Bradmore, Bramcote, Bramcote Hills, Brinkley, Brinsley, Brough, Broxtowe, Budby, Bulcote, Bulwell, Bunny, Burton Joyce, Butler's Hill

== C ==
Calverton, Car Colston, Carburton, Carlton, Carlton in Lindrick, Carlton-on-Trent, Carrington, Caunton, Caythorpe, Chilwell, Church Laneham, Church Warsop, Clarborough, Clayworth, Clifton, Clipston, Clipstone, Coates, Coddington, Collingham, Colston Bassett, Colwick, Cossall, Costock, Costhorpe, Cotgrave, Cotham, Cottam, Cromwell, Cropwell Bishop, Cropwell Butler, Cuckney, Cuckney Hill

== D ==
Darlton, Dorket Head, Dunkirk, Dunham

== E ==
Eakring, East Bridgford, East Drayton, East Leake, East Markham, East Stoke, Easthorpe, Eastwood, Eaton, Edingley, Edwalton, Edwinstowe, Egmanton, Elkesley, Elston, Elton on the Hill, Epperstone, Everton

== F ==
Fairham, Farndon, Farnsfield, Felley, Fenton, Fiskerton, Flawborough, Fledborough, Flintham, Forest Town

== G ==
Gamston (Bassetlaw), Gamston (Rushcliffe), Gateford, Gedling, Giltbrook, Girton, Gonalston, Gotham, Goverton, Granby, Grassthorpe, Greasley, Gringley-on-the-Hill, Grove, Gunthorpe

== H ==
Halam, Halloughton, Harby, Hardwick Village, Harlequin, Harworth, Haughton, Hawksworth, Hawton, Hayton, Haywood Oaks, Headon, Hickling, High Marnham, Hockerton, Hodsock, Holbeck, Holbeck Woodhouse, Holme, Holme Pierrepont, Hoveringham, Hucknall, Huthwaite, Hyson Green

== J ==
Jacksdale

== K ==
Kelham, Kersall, Keyworth, Kilton, Kilvington, Kimberley, Kings Clipstone, Kingston on Soar, Kinoulton, Kirkby-in-Ashfield, Kirkby Woodhouse, Kirklington, Kirton, Knapthorpe, Kneesall, Kneeton

== L ==
Lambley, Laneham, Langar, Langford, Langold, Laxton, Leen Valley, Lenton, Lenton Abbey, Lidgett, Linby, Lindhurst, Little Carlton, Little Green, Little Gringley, Littleborough, Lound, Low Marnham, Lowdham

== M ==
Mansfield, Mansfield Woodhouse, Manton, Maplebeck, Mapperley, Market Warsop, Markham Moor, Mattersey, Mattersey Thorpe, Maythorne, Meadows, Meden Vale, Milton, Misson, Misterton, Misterton Carr, Moorgreen, Moorhouse, Morton

== N ==
Nether Headon, Nether Langwith, Netherfield, New Balderton, New Brinsley, New Ollerton, Newark-on-Trent, Newington, Newstead, Newthorpe, Newton, Normanton, Normanton on Soar, Normanton on Trent, Normanton-on-the-Wolds, North Carlton North Clifton, North Leverton with Habblesthorpe, North Muskham, North Wheatley, Norton, Norwell, Norwell Woodhouse, Nottingham, Nuncargate, Nuthall

== O ==
Old Basford, Old Clipstone, Oldcotes, Ollerton, Ompton, Ordsall, Orston, Osberton, Ossington, Owthorpe, Oxton

== P ==
Papplewick, Perlethorpe, Pleasley, Pleasley Hill, Plumtree

== R ==
Radcliffe on Trent, Radford, Ragnall, Rainworth, Rampton, Ranby, Ranskill, Ratcliffe on Soar, Ravenshead, Rayton, Redhill, Rempstone, Retford, Rhodesia, Rolleston, Ruddington, Rylands

== S ==
Saundby, Saxondale, Scaftworth, Scarrington, Scofton, Screveton, Scrooby, Selston, Serlby, Shelford, Shelton, Sherwood, Shireoaks, Sibthorpe, Skegby (Ashfield), Skegby (Bassetlaw), Sneinton, Sookholme, South Clifton, South Leverton, South Muskham, South Scarle, South Wheatley, Southwell, Spalford, Spion Kop, Stanford on Soar, Stanley, Stanton Hill, Stanton-on-the-Wolds, Stapleford, Staunton in the Vale, Staythorpe, Stoke Bardolph, Stokeham, Strelley, Sturton le Steeple, Styrrup, Sutton Bonington, Sutton-cum-Granby, Sutton-in-Ashfield, Sutton on Trent, Sutton cum Lound, Swingate, Syerston

== T ==
Teversal, Thoresby, Thorney, Thoroton, Thorpe-by-Newark, Thorpe in the Glebe, Thrumpton (Bassetlaw), Thrumpton (Rushcliffe), Thurgarton, Tiln, Tithby, Tollerton, Torworth, Toton, Treswell, Trowell, Tuxford

== U ==
Underwood, Upper Broughton, Upper Saxondale, Upton (Bassetlaw), Upton (Newark and Sherwood)

== W ==
Walesby, Walkeringham, Wallingwells, Warsop Vale, Watnall, Wellow, West Bridgford, West Drayton, West Leake, West Markham, West Stockwith, Westhorpe, Weston, Westville, Whaley Thorns, Whatton-in-the-Vale, Welham, White Houses, Whitemoor, Wicketwood Hill, Widmerpool, Wigsley, Wigthorpe, Wilford, Willoughby on the Wolds, Winkburn, Winthorpe, Wiseton, Wollaton, Woodbeck, Woodborough, Woodthorpe, Worksop, Wysall

== Z ==
Zouch

== See also ==
- List of Nottingham suburbs within the city
- List of civil parishes in Nottinghamshire
- List of settlements in Nottinghamshire by population
- List of places in England
