= Newark Wapentake =

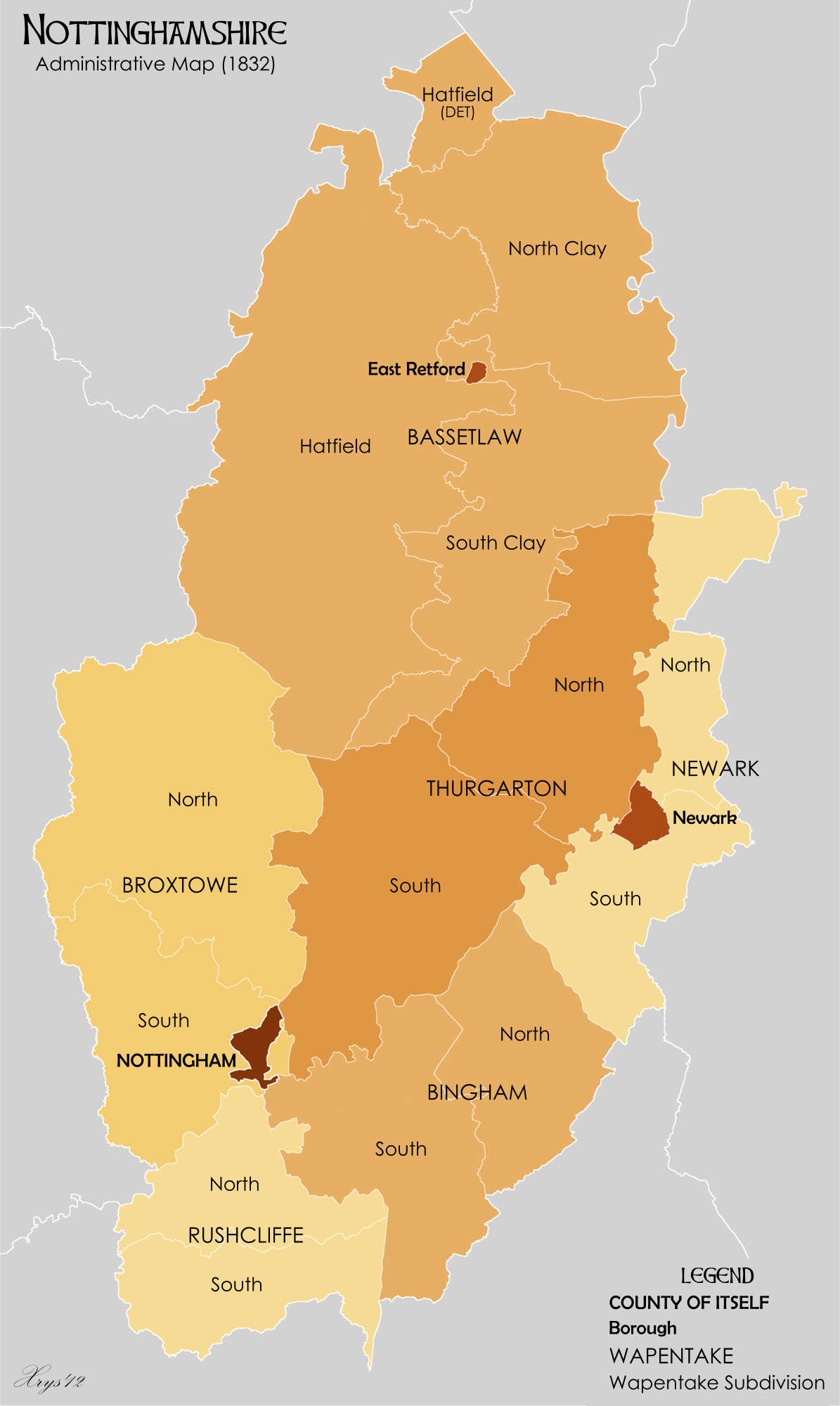
Map showing the Newark wapentake

Newark was a wapentake (equivalent to a hundred) of the historic county of Nottinghamshire, England.

== Constituents ==
It was in the east of the county with the River Trent forming most of the western boundary. It consisted of the parishes of Alverton, Balderton, Barnby in the Willows, Besthorpe, Broadholme, Coddington, Cotham, East Stoke, Elston, Farndon, Flawborough, Flawford, Girton, Harby, Hawton, Kilvington, Langford, Newark upon Trent, North Clifton, North Collingham, Shelton, Sibthorpe, South Clifton, South Collingham, South Scarle, Spalford, Staunton, Syerston, Thorney, Thorpe, Wigsley and Winthorpe.

Its residual significance was lost with the introduction of districts under the Local Government Act 1894. Contained within the boundaries of the wapentake were the eastern part of the current Newark and Sherwood district. However, Broadholme has been part of Lincolnshire since 1989.
