= List of settlements in Nottinghamshire by population =

This is a list of settlements in Nottinghamshire by population based on the results of the 2021 census. The following United Kingdom census will take place in 2031. In 2011, there were 34 built-up area subdivisions with 5,000 or more inhabitants in Nottinghamshire, shown in the table below.

Map of locations
Nottinghamshire's largest administrative centres, the only city (Nottingham) in **bold**.	Nottinghamshire's largest non-administrative centres.

== List of settlements ==
#	Urban Subdivision	Population			District	Areas within				
#	Urban Subdivision	2001	2011	2021	District	Areas within				
#	Urban Subdivision	1	**Nottingham**	249,584 (266,988)	District	Areas within	289,301 (305,680)	323,700	City of Nottingham	Full list of areas given at the Nottingham (Within the city) section. See notes and separate entries regarding areas south of the Trent - Clifton, Silverdale & Wilford. Figures in brackets are the population of the city council (Unitary Authority/UA) area.
2	**Mansfield**	69,987	77,551	111,500	Mansfield	Clipstone, Forest Town, Pleasley See notes for Mansfield Woodhouse.				
3	**Beeston**	66,683	51,479	52,365	Broxtowe	Attenborough, Bramcote, Chilwell, Toton See notes for Beeston.				
4	**Carlton**	48,493	49,235	53,555	Gedling	Colwick, Gedling Village, Mapperley, Netherfield, Porchester, Thorneywood				
5	**Sutton-In-Ashfield**	32,885	34,256	36,404	Ashfield	Fackley, Huthwaite, Skegby, Stanton Hill				
6	**West Bridgford**	43,395	45,509	36,487	Rushcliffe /City of Nottingham	Compton Acres, Edwalton, Gamston, Lady Bay, Silverdale, Wilford See notes regarding included city areas.				
7	**Worksop**	39,072	41,820	44,733	Bassetlaw	Gateford, Kilton, Manton				
8	**Arnold**	37,402	37,768	39,995	Gedling	Daybrook, Killisick, Redhill, Woodthorpe				
9	**Newark-on-Trent**	35,454	37,084	30,345	Newark and Sherwood	Balderton				
10	**Hucknall**	29,188	32,107	35,849	Ashfield/Gedling	Butler's Hill, Linby, Westville				
11	**Kirkby-in-Ashfield**	27,067	26,927	21,262	Ashfield	Annesley, Annesley Woodhouse, Kirkby Woodhouse, Nuncargate, Old Kirkby				
12	**Clifton**	22,312	22,407	22,936	City of Nottingham	Clifton Village				
13	**Retford**	21,314	22,023	23,740	Bassetlaw	Ordsall				
14	**Mansfield Woodhouse**	17,931	18,574	19,525	Mansfield					
15	**Eastwood**	18,612	18,422	18,887	Broxtowe	Greasley, Giltbrook, Moorgreen, Newthorpe				
16	**Stapleford**	14,991	16,190	15,453	Broxtowe	See notes for Beeston.				
17	**Kimberley**	11,027	11,353	11,027	Broxtowe	Nuthall, Swingate, Watnall				
18	**Ollerton**	9,900	9,840	11,103	Newark and Sherwood	Boughton, Ollerton Village				
19	**Bingham**	8,685	9,131	10,080	Rushcliffe					
20	**Warsop**	9,553	9,018	12,644	Mansfield	Church Warsop				
21	**Bircotes**	7,441	7,948	8,886	Bassetlaw	Harworth				
22	**Rainworth**	7,829	7,693	7,053	Newark and Sherwood/Mansfield					
23	**Radcliffe-on-Trent**	7,189	7,510	8,144	Rushcliffe	Harlequin				
24	**Cotgrave**	7,373	7,203	8,206	Rushcliffe					
25	**Ruddington**	6,264	7,020	7,264	Rushcliffe					
26	**Selston**	11,456	12,596	12,240	Ashfield	Alma, Selston Common, Selston Green See notes for Selston.				
27	**Calverton**	6,720	6,868	7,282	Gedling					
28	**Southwell**	6,285	6,757	7,491	Newark and Sherwood	Easthorpe, Westhorpe				
29	**Keyworth**	6,920	6,733	6,821	Rushcliffe	Plumtree Park				
30	**East Leake**	6,108	6,337	8,553	Rushcliffe					
31	**Ravenshead**	5,636	5,759	5,366	Gedling					
32	**Carlton-in-Lindrick**	5,684	5,456	5,635	Bassetlaw	Costhorpe				
33	**Edwinstowe**	4,959	5,188	5,320	Newark and Sherwood	Lidgett				
34	**Brinsley**	4,785	5,038	4,514	Broxtowe/Ashfield	Bagthorpe, New Brinsley, Underwood See notes for Selston.				

Notes:

- At the time of the 2001 census the Beeston subdivision included Stapleford and was named Beeston And Stapleford, hence the increased figure.
- At the time of the 2001 census the Selston subdivision included Brinsley.
- Clifton is administratively in Nottingham, but counted separately from the city itself for ONS purposes.
- Silverdale and Wilford while administratively in Nottingham, are counted separately from the city and instead included with the West Bridgford subdivision, again for ONS purposes.
- Mansfield Woodhouse is counted separately from Mansfield.

== See also ==
- List of places in Nottinghamshire
- List of civil parishes in Nottinghamshire
- Nottingham Built-up Area
