= Syerston =

Village and civil parish in Nottinghamshire, England

Coordinates: 53.0187°N 0.8877°W

- Village and civil parish
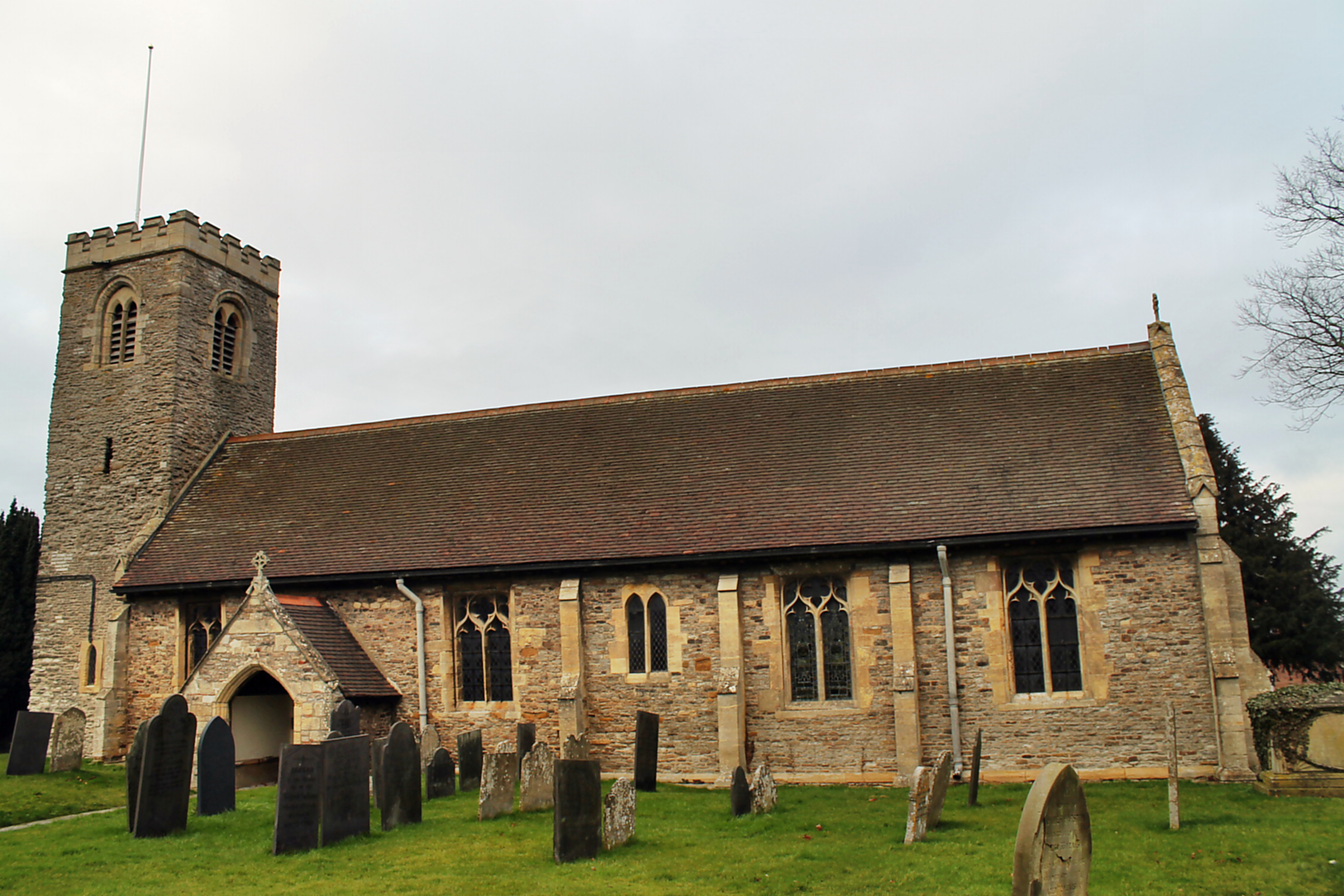
- All Saints' church, Syerston

- Location within Nottinghamshire
- Interactive map of Syerston
- Area: 1.2 sq mi (3.1 km^{2})
- Population: 169 (2021)
  - Density: 141/sq mi (54/km^{2})
- OS grid reference: SK 7547
  - London: 110 mi (180 km) SSE
- District: Newark and Sherwood
- Shire county: Nottinghamshire
- Region: East Midlands
- Country: England
- Sovereign state: United Kingdom
- Post town: NEWARK
- Postcode district: NG23
- Dialling code: 01636
- Police: Nottinghamshire
- Fire: Nottinghamshire
- Ambulance: East Midlands
- UK Parliament: Newark
- Website: syerstonvillagehall.wixsite.com/parish-meeting

Syerston is a small civil parish in Nottinghamshire, England. It is about six miles south-west of Newark-on-Trent, and is bisected by the A46 trunk road. Its population was 179 inhabitants in 73 households, according to the 2011 census. The population had fallen to 169 residents at the 2021 census, which were almost all in a settlement to the east of the road. The parish is bounded on the north-east by Elston, on the south-east by Flintham and to the east by Sibthorpe. Its southern boundary is the supposed pre-historic trackway called Longhedge Lane.

The Highways Agency constructed in 2011/12 a new seventeen miles long two-lane dual carriageway from the A606 two level junction at Widmerpool to an improved roundabout at Farndon. This passes through the parish between the old A46, which is thought to follow the line of the old Roman Fosse Way, and the settlement of Syerston.

RAF Syerston is almost all in Flintham parish, immediately to the south of Syerston parish and to the west of the A46 trunk road.

== Toponymy ==
The place appears as Sirestune in the Domesday Survey of 1086 and as Sireston juxta Stok (i.e. ...'next to Stoke') in the Assize Rolls of 1278. Scholars are in agreement that the name means the farm or settlement of someone called Sigehere, from an Old English personal name + tūn.

== Domesday survey ==
The Domesday survey indicates that the Syerston of 1086 was owned by four parties:

- the King’s thanes;
- Robert of Moutiers from Count Alan of Brittany;
- Remigius de Fécamp, Bishop of Lincoln,
- Godwin from Berengar de Tosny.

Ten freemen (sochemanni), four villagers (villani) and five smallholders (bordarii) are mentioned. Assuming that these were the heads of nineteen households, the population of Syerston in 1086 was perhaps around 80.

== Landscape and ownership ==
By the end of the Commonwealth in 1660, Syerston was the property of Robert Sutton, 1st Baron Lexinton, a member of the Sutton family, who were landowners of Averham and elsewhere. His son, Robert Sutton, 2nd Baron Lexinton, had a daughter Bridget who married, in 1717, John Manners, 3rd Duke of Rutland and so Syerston passed to the Dukes of Rutland by marriage (along with the manors of Averham, Kelham and Rolleston). Some sixty years later in 1775 Lord George Sutton, a son of the third Duke of Rutland, sold Syerston to Lewis Disney Ffytche of Flintham Hall. Sixteen years later, Ffytche sold the village to William Fillingham (1734–95).

The landscape of present-day Syerston is principally the work of William Fillingham, who was of a yeoman family from nearby Flawborough. Following work as a land surveyor, he became steward to the Duke of Rutland at Belvoir Castle, and also land agent to several other local families. He acted in the capacity of enclosure commissioner for over twenty parishes in Nottinghamshire from 1774, as well as several in Lincolnshire, Leicestershire, Rutland and Derbyshire.

The fees for acting as Commissioner, usually two guineas (£2 and 2 shillings) per day, together with profits from other ventures, such as a number of canal companies and urban property in Newark, enabled him in July 1791 to purchase for £12,375, without a mortgage, the manor of Syerston from Lewis Disney Ffytche and to begin construction of a small mansion.

The manor consisted of 10 messuages, 5 cottages, 10 gardens, 10 orchards, 500a. land, 50a meadow, 100a. pasture, 10a. wood, 100a. furze and heath, 50a. moor, 10a. water, 6s.4d. rent, turbary, fishing, etc. in Sierston and Flintham. Because William Fillingham had himself surveyed the estate as early as 1775 and had arranged to have estimates made of the improved value of Syerston if enclosed, with costs of enclosure, it is not difficult to guess his next move.

Syerston Inclosure Act 1792
- Act of Parliament
- Parliament of Great Britain
- Long title: An Act for dividing and enclosing the Open Arable Fields, Meadows, Commons, and Waste Grounds, within the Township of Syerston, in the County of Nottingham.
- Citation: 32 Geo. 3. c. 49 Pr.
- Territorial extent: Great Britain

Dates
- Royal assent: 11 June 1792
- Commencement: 31 January 1792 (Note: Start of session.)

Status: Current legislation

He seems immediately to have begun the process of petitioning Parliament for permission to enclose those parts of the parish, about 500 acres (200 hectares), which remained unimproved: An Act For Dividing and Inclosing the Open Arable Fields, Meadows, Commons, and Waste Grounds, within the Township of Syerston, in the County of Nottingham, the Syerston Inclosure Act 1792 (32 Geo. 3. c. 49 Pr.), was published on 25 October 1791.

Bearing in mind Fillingham's expertise in these matters, it is surprising that while the enclosure map (by William Attenburrow of East Stoke, covering 769 acres or about 300 hectares), is dated 1792, the Award itself was not signed until as late as 27 June 1795.

The map reveals that Syerston formerly had a detached portion (or exclave), of about fifty acres around Elston Grange farm, reached along Brecks Lane, which was separated from the main part of the township by about 1,100 yards (1.0 km) of Elston territory. This anomaly was eliminated by one of the many Local Government Acts (perhaps the Divided Parishes and Poor Law Amendment Act 1882) when Elston gained the land, but seems still to exist as part of the ecclesiastical area of Syerston.

The tithes were extinguished at the enclosure: Fillingham as impropriator (a layman in possession of church property) received 77 acres in lieu of the tithes, and the vicar of East Stoke, Thomas Wakefield, received allotments of land totalling about 41 acres. The land in Syerston allotted to the vicar was part of Cuthill Field (30 acres) and the Moor allotment (11 acres). He leased them to George Wakefield of East Stoke, gentleman (his son and heir), for 21 years at £29 10s. per annum.

William Fillingham could perhaps be seen as an example of the 18th-century social phenomenon of newly wealthy men seeking admission to the landed élite by enclosure and "emparkment". Fillingham bought an open manorial estate, which had belonged to his former employers, enclosed the land, built a house and rearranged the property.

At this point William died and the land together with, the almost complete mansion, Syerston Hall, were inherited by his son George Fillingham (1774–1850). One of his first tasks was to arrange for the Award of the parliamentary commissioners to be put into effect and for the new fields to be hedged or fenced and new thoroughfares laid out. This meant, over about the next three years, organising the collection of stone for the making of roads; purchasing thousands of quickset (or whitethorn) plants, having them planted as hedges, and also arranging for ditches to be dug, fence posts put in, saplings bought for plantations, and all the other tasks that were specified in the Award. George also finished the building of the Hall, and in time established the family amongst the local gentry. Upon his death in 1850 the estate passed to his only son, George (1809–1856), who enjoyed only a short tenure before being succeeded by his son George Henry Fillingham (1841–95) in 1856.

According to a contemporary newspaper obituary, George Henry Fillingham died on 17 January 1895 at the age of 53 of 'heart disease aggravated by an accident'. A sportsman, he had broken a thigh while out hunting with the South Notts Hunt at Halloughton six weeks before, but the writer, David Frith, asserted that he had shot himself in what was 'deemed to be an accident'. He had only been married for four years and left a son, George Augustus Fillingham (1893–1974).

== Population ==
A hint of what the Syerston landscape looked like in 1517 is contained in the findings of enclosure commissioners who were appointed to discover the extent to which arable land in England had been converted to pasture for sheep. They found that since 1489, only five acres of arable land in the parish had been enclosed for pasture, this by Henry Boson in 1513. Conversion of land use to sheep herding (which required few labourers) would not therefore seem to have been a concern at the time.

The Protestation Returns of 1642 were intended to record a full list of all male inhabitants aged 18 and over in each parish. The total population can be estimated by considering the likely proportion of the population under 18, perhaps 40%, and doubling to allow for women. Thirty names are listed in the parish returns, with the note "no popish recusants and none refused". A population estimate for Syerston, immediately before the English Civil War, is therefore 100.

The Hearth Tax was introduced after the Civil War in 1662 to provide a regular source of income for the newly restored monarch, King Charles II. Sometimes referred to as "chimney money", the tax was essentially a property tax on households (rather than houses) graded according to the number of their fireplaces. The 1664 Hearth Tax returns show that Syerston had 21 chargeable hearths in 18 households and eight non-chargeable hearths in seven households. A multiplier, recommended by some authorities, is 4.3, which gives a population for Syerston at the end of the English Civil War of 108 in the 25 households.

Village surnames which span the Civil War period include Townerow, Browne, Hammond, Barnes, Ward and Leeson.

By 1676 it was of urgent interest to discover the religious opinions of the people, since the Catholic James was likely to succeed his brother King Charles II. This anxiety led to the Compton Census, a national ecclesiastical survey named for Henry Compton, Bishop of London. Adults (defined as those over the age of sixteen) in each parish were recorded as either communicants, popish recusants, or other dissenters. Nicholaus Smithurst, vicar of East Stoke, recorded 49 communicants, no recusants and just two dissenters in Syerston. Demographic historians suggest that the proportion of the population over 16 in such settlements at the time was about 65%, which implies a total population of about 78. The Rev Smithurst found no Catholics or other dissenters in East Stoke or Elston Chapel, but next door Flintham was a hot spot of nonconformity and the vicar, Edward Guy, found as many as 40 dissenters. At any rate the authorities had little need to fear papistry in Syerston.

An estate survey of 1724, while the 3rd Duke of Rutland owned the village, recorded only twelve dwellings. These were three farmhouses, seven farm cottages and two "houses", which had once belonged to farms, but had lost their land and associated buildings. One of these houses was occupied by a Mr Hammond, who ‘growing poor his farme was broke and laid to Shaws and Browns and made up the Old Rent exclusive of the House and 1a. of Meadow and 4 Acre of Arrable which my lord …said he should enjoy Rent free for his life’. Assuming a family size in 1724 of 4.75, the village would have had only about 57 inhabitants, perhaps an indicator of a local morbidity crisis or simply a lack of available housing.

In 1743 a new Archbishop of York, Thomas Herring, was appointed Soon after taking up his post he wrote to all the clergy of the diocese to ask about the parishes they served. Syerston's curate, Francis Bainbridge, replied to the archiepiscopal enquiry, and his answers indicate what a small backwater the place was in the middle of the 18th century:

Table to show the population of the township in the nineteenth century from the decennial census:
Year	Population
1801	109
1811	137
1821	129
1831	138
1841	208
1851	241
1861	196
1871	184
1881	165
1891	104
1901	123

- I. There are 15 families in ye Town of Syreston of wch. yre is but one Dissenter named Joseph Bestall they say an Independant, he never received the Sacrament wth Us, of three Years yt he hath lived in ye Town till ye last Whitsuntide, since he was made Ch:Warden & we know not that he has gone to any Meeting for Religious Worsp. in all ye time aforesd.
- II. We have no Licens'd or other Meeting house in ye sd Town
- III. There is no publick or Charity School there
- IV. There is not in ye sd Town any Almshouse or Charitable Endowmt Nor have any Lands or Tenements been left for ye repair of ye Church.
- V. There is no Vicarage-house in ye sd Town it being only an Appendage of East Stoake,
- VI. I have no residing Curate there.
- VII I believe yt all who come to Church are Baptized, & yt all who are of a Competent Age are Confirmed by Your Grace
- VIII. Sierstone has Service in ye Church every fortnight Sunday Afternoon according to ye old Usage
- IX. I do not so often Catechise there as at Stoake by reason of going there, & having ye fatigue of preaching in ye Afternoon, when I have preached at Stoake in ye morning,
- X. The Sacrament of ye Lord's Supper is Administer'd thrice in ye Year namely at Easter Whitsuntide & Christmas, there are upwards of 20 Communicants, about 8 Communicated at Easter
- XI. I give timely & open Warning of the Sacrament & have not refus'd it to any One.
I am My Lord Your Grace’s most Dutyfull Son & most Obedient Servant
F Bainbridge

If the family size was 4.75 in 1743, then the settlement had recovered to about seventy inhabitants at that time.

By the first decennial census of 1801 the population had risen to 109 in 23 families. The table (at right) shows the population during the whole of the nineteenth century, although the anomalous figures for 1841 and 1851 indicate the possibility of confusion with East Stoke and its other chapelry of Coddington.

Although the Reform Act 1832 had extended the franchise, only nine male land-, or lease-holders out of Syerston's supposed population of 241, were eligible to vote in the South Nottinghamshire by-election of 1851 and three of them were not even residents of the parish. One lived in Newark-on-Trent, another at Elston and the third at Rampton. Of the nine eligible, all but one did vote. While Syerston voters preferred Sydney Pierrepont (the future Earl Manvers) to the tenant farmers' candidate William Barrow of Southwell by six votes to two, it was actually the latter who was narrowly elected for the constituency.

== Church ==
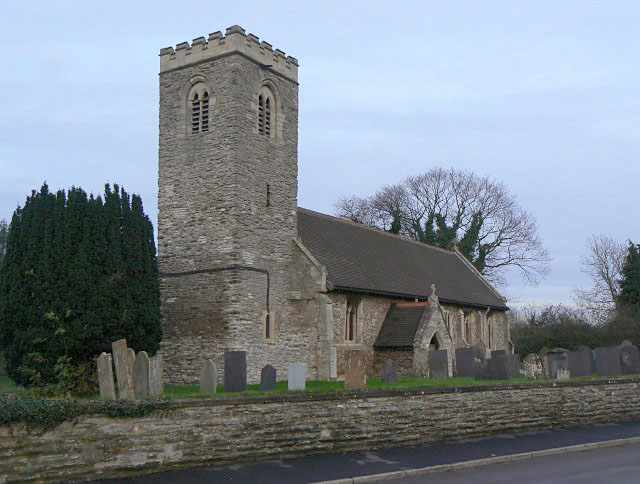

For most of its existence, Syerston seems to have been a chapelry of East Stoke, from which it is physically separated by Elston parish. Dr Robert Thoroton says ' I suppose this Town is in Stoke Parish, for the Vicar comes and serves the Cure here';. This ecclesiastical arrangement was superseded in 1866 when one of the effects of the Poor Law Amendment Act of that year, was to make places which levied a separate poor rate into civil parishes. So Syerston gained its independence from East Stoke.

The church of All Saints, Syerston is small, as befits a former parochial chapelry, and has an aisle-less nave. It measures within from the east wall to the door of the vestry at the base of the tower, just under sixty-seven and a half feet; and from the south to the north wall nearly fifteen feet. The nave and chancel are probably of fourteenth-century origin and were rebuilt in 1896 in memory of G. H. Fillingham (q.v), at the expense of his widow. On the south side are two square headed fourteenth century windows as well as a, probably earlier, double-lancet window. On the north side is a blocked-up doorway; it may have been used as an exit point for the processions which were a feature of church services before the Reformation. The porch was repaired in 1724 and bears the date and the initials W.H.and C.W. The very fine carved-oak pulpit, its eight sides, backboard, and canopy all a mass of carved panels, is from 1636. The pews are Victorian. The arms of George III are displayed on a square painted board. The monuments are all to the Fillinghams from William the encloser, who died in 1795 to George Augustus, died 1974. There is a small unbuttressed thirteenth-century tower, with battlements which replaced an earlier brick and plaster parapet at the 1896 refurbishment. Two scratch (or mass) dials, each with its central hole for a gnomon, appear on the south wall of the church to the right of the porch, and another, strangely inverted, scratch dial appears incorporated into the stonework of the porch itself, probably upturned at a rebuilding. These would have given some indication of the times of church services and perhaps also acted as a village timepiece, before clocks came into general use.

In 1851, at the same time as the decennial census, which recorded a village population of 241 (122 males and 119 females), there was a census of 'accommodation and attendance at worship.' This is often referred to as the '1851 Religious Census.' It revealed that a Wesleyan Methodist chapel had been erected on Hawksworth Road in 1847, and local farmer Henry Fisher reported that 40 worshippers attended the evening service on Sunday, 30 March and that there was 'preaching once a day in the evening.' The vicar gave no attendance figure for the parish church; Thomas Pawson (described as a Registrar), merely stated that there was space for 130. A religious census was never repeated, not because of doubts about its accuracy, but perhaps instead because it was felt to have shown the popularity of the dissenters.

== Listed buildings ==
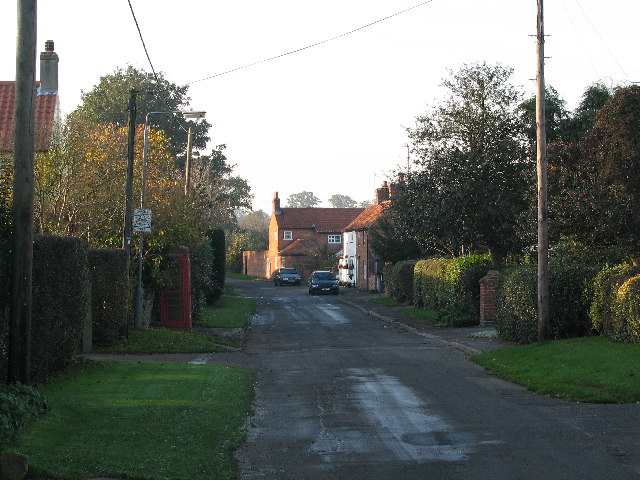
General view of Moor Lane, Syerston

A building is listed if it is considered to be of merit, either due to its architecture or because of its historical value. In England and Wales there are three grades of listing: grades I, II* and II. Grade II is the most common, accounting for about 92% of all listed buildings, and is for buildings of ‘special interest’.

The parish has seven grade II listed buildings:

- Syerston Hall and Attached Outbuilding and Garden Wall – country house and attached outbuilding and garden wall. 1793-6. At the back, a one-bay-deep extension of 1812.
- Stable Block, Adjacent Pump and Attached Hen House at Syerston Hall – c.1800.
- Pigeoncote at Syerston Hall – c.1800.
- Montague House – early nineteenth-century house on Church Lane.
- Low Farm House – seventeenth- and early-eighteenth-century farmhouse on Moor Lane.
- Barn at Low Farm – early-eighteenth-century barn in red brick on Moor Lane.
- Church of All Saints – parish church of thirteenth and fourteenth centuries, restored in 1896.

== Longhedge Lane ==
Longhedge Lane, called Vale Road in the Enclosure Award of 1795, may have begun as a Bronze Age trackway forming part of a route linking the navigable river Welland, east of Stamford, to the river Trent. Its course is clearly defined from an island in the Trent, called The Nabbs, along the southern edge of the parish to the Sibthorpe boundary. Since the construction of RAF Syerston in 1940 the lane is no longer accessible as it crosses the airfield.

From Sibthorpe, Longhedge Lane is easily traced, coterminous with parish boundaries, as it passes Shelton, Flawborough and Alverton on its way to Bottesford, Leicestershire. To the east of that village, it seems to follow a course along Muston, Easthorpe and Woolsthorpe lanes to a point in Sedgebrook parish where it joins the better known trackway Sewstern Drift (or Lane) which runs from the Stamford area of Lincolnshire, north in the direction of Newark.

Longhedge Lane may therefore be seen as a spur to Sewstern Drift and an alternative way to reach the Trent from the south. At some stage, perhaps the turnpiking of the Great North Road in the 1730s and 40s, that more easterly route became preferred and Longhedge Lane sank into disuse and obscurity.

== Demographics ==
The parish reported a population of 169 people at the 2021 census.

At the 2011 census, the parish of Syerston had a higher resident population of 179, of whom, according to the Office for National Statistics:

	Syerston (parish)	Newark & Sherwood (Non-Met District)	England
Age
Median age	52	43	39
Under 18	19.0%	20.6%	21.4%
Over 65	21.9%	19.0%	16.4%
Ethnic group
White British	95.5%	94.2%	79.8%
White Other	2.2%	3.3%	5.7%
Mixed/Multiple	0.0%	1.0%	2.2%
Asian or British Asian	2.2%	0.9%	7.7%
Black or Black British	0.0%	0.4%	3.4%
Other ethnic group	0.0%	0.1%	1.0%
Religion
Christian	67.0%	66.1%	59.4%
Buddhist	0.0%	0.2%	0.5%
Hindu	2.2%	0.2%	1.5%
Jewish	0.0%	0.1%	0.5%
Muslim	0.0%	0.4%	5.0%
Sikh	0.0%	0.1%	0.8%
Another religion	0.0%	0.3%	0.4%
No religion	25.7%	25.6%	24.7%
Did not answer	5.0%	6.8%	7.2%
