= Fillingham (surname) =

Fillingham is an English surname. Notable people with this surname include:

- George Fillingham (1841–1895), English cricketer
- Pat Fillingham (1914–2003), English test pilot
- Tom Fillingham (1904–1960), English footballer

== See also ==
- Fillingham, village and civil parish in Lincolnshire, England
