= Manton Colliery =

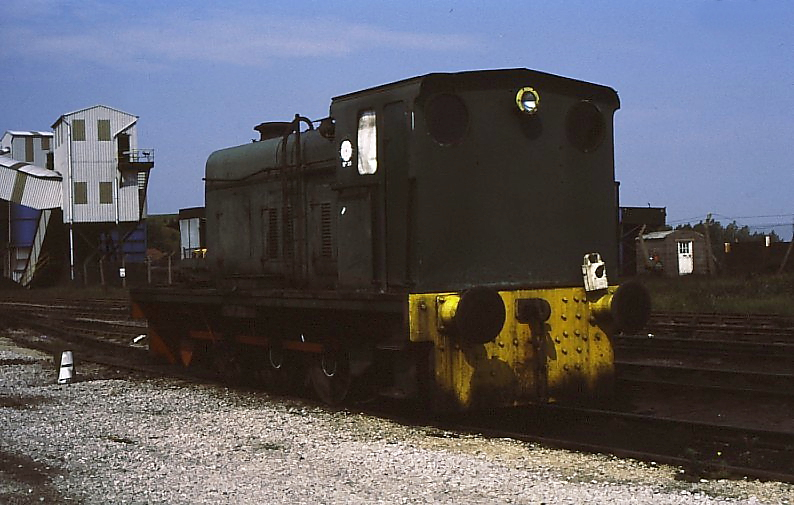
- Taken in 1980

- Location in Nottinghamshire
- Location: Manton, Nottinghamshire, S80 2RS, Nottinghamshire, England; 53°18′N 1°04′W
- Products: Coal
- Opened: 1898
- Closed: 1994
- Company: RJB Mining, British Coal

Manton Colliery was a coal mine in north Nottinghamshire (Bassetlaw). The site was also known as Manton Wood Colliery.

== History ==
The land was owned by Henry Pelham-Clinton, 7th Duke of Newcastle. Shafts were dug through Sherwood Sandstone and Lower Magnesian Limestone. The engine house was built in 1905. The mine was fully operational in around 1907, with three shafts. The first death at the pit occurred on 23 October 1903.

Manton, the village, was a new model village built to house the miners.

In the 1984 miners' strike, the pit was the scene of some ugly episodes.

=== Closure ===
The pit closed on 11 February 1994. Around 1,500 people worked at the pit when it closed. At the time of closure there were eight pits in Nottinghamshire.

Many pits closed from 1993 to 1994, and Manton was the 29th to close in one year. It was the eighth pit in Bassetlaw to close after the 1984 miner's strike.

== Structure ==
It was sited off the A57 at the B6040 roundabout. The Sheffield-Lincoln Line ran east–west to the north of the site. Shunters from the pit are preserved at Peak Rail in Derbyshire.

== Ownership ==
After nationalisation (Coal Industry Nationalisation Act 1946) on 1 January 1947, the pit was put in the South Yorkshire Region, not the Nottinghamshire region.

== Production ==
In 1979, over a million tonnes of coal was extracted from the pit; most went to the CEGB's Cottam Power Station. Once privatisation of the electricity industry had taken place in 1990, power stations were under less onus to burn coal as a primary form of power (base load), known as the Dash for Gas, which may have largely led to the pit's closure.
