= Staunton, Nottinghamshire =

Village in Nottinghamshire, England

Coordinates: 52.984389°N 0.801002°W

Staunton-in-the-Vale
- Village and civil parish
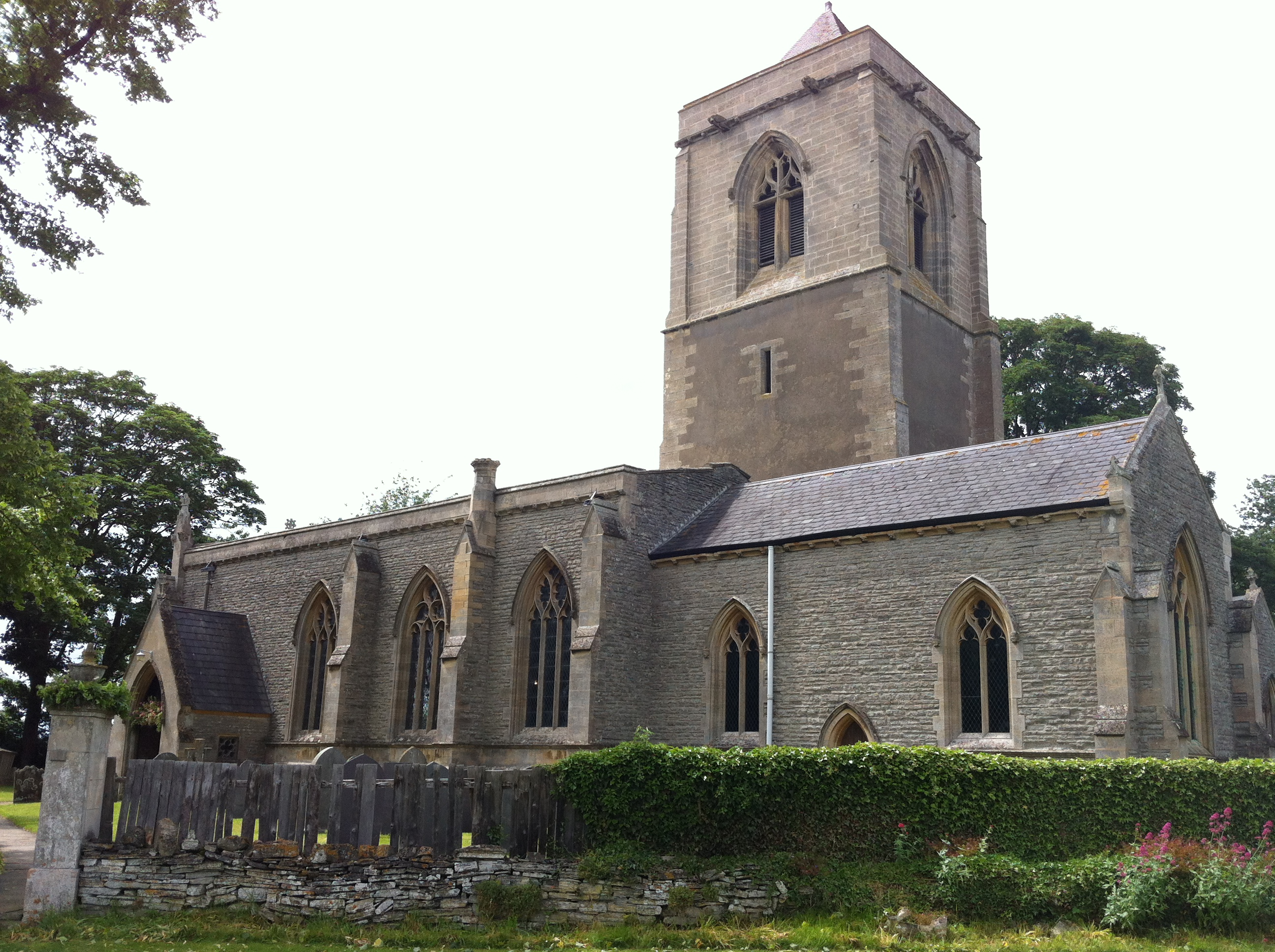
- St Mary's, Staunton

- Location within Nottinghamshire
- Interactive map of Staunton-in-the-Vale
- Area: 2.15 sq mi (5.6 km^{2})
- Population: 66 (2021)
  - Density: 31/sq mi (12/km^{2})
- OS grid reference: SK 80590 43684
  - London: 105 mi (169 km) SE
- District: Newark and Sherwood
- Shire county: Nottinghamshire
- Region: East Midlands
- Country: England
- Sovereign state: United Kingdom
- Post town: NOTTINGHAM
- Postcode district: NG13
- Dialling code: 01400 / 01949
- Police: Nottinghamshire
- Fire: Nottinghamshire
- Ambulance: East Midlands
- UK Parliament: Newark

Staunton (also known as Staunton-in-the-Vale) is a small village and civil parish in the Newark and Sherwood district of Nottinghamshire, England. It takes its name from the Vale of Belvoir and shares it with the local Staunton family, which has resided in the area since the Norman Conquest and possibly before, making them one of the few English families still resident on their estate.

== Geography ==
The settlement lies 15 miles east of Nottingham, six miles south of Newark-on-Trent, and six miles north of Belvoir, within the Vale of Belvoir. The land is generally very low-lying and level, averaging 66 feet (20 m) in elevation, except for a ridge north of the village centre that rises to 115 feet (35 m), and the highest point of Folly Hill at 151 feet (46 m) on the eastern boundary of the parish. The conjunction of three counties, Three Shire Oak, is by the south-east corner of the parish. The population was 66 at the 2021 census. The village is mainly rural, with much farmland, but very little in the way of amenities.

Staunton's neighbours include:

- Cotham, Nottinghamshire to the north
- Flawborough and Shelton, Nottinghamshire to the west
- Alverton, Kilvington, and Normanton/Bottesford, Leicestershire to the south
- Long Bennington, Lincolnshire to the east

The historic village area is primarily by the crossroads in the High Street. The Back Dyke forms the northern boundary of the parish and the River Devon the southern.

Local leisure areas include Stanton Park to the south-east of the village centre, and the Staunton Quarry Nature Reserve by the Back Dyke, which is a reclaimed gypsum/limestone mine, notable as a preserve of the Grizzled Skipper butterfly.

== Economy ==
Most of the parish consists of agricultural land, which accounts for some local employment.

The only public house, The Staunton Arms, stands in the High Street at the crossroads.

The Staunton Industrial Estate maintains units and workshops for small-scale manufacturing about 1 km (0.62 mi) north-west of the village, off Grange Lane.

== Education ==
Staunton School, in the High Street, is primarily a nursery, started in 2001 and run by Staunton family members. Private schooling is also available for older children.

== History ==
In the Domesday Book of 1086, the village was known as Stanton. It was recorded that Malger held the manor through the feudal tenure of the castle guard at Belvoir. He had charge of a high tower known as Staunton's Tower. Whenever the Royal Family visits Belvoir, the head of the Staunton family attends and presents the golden key of the tower, as did the Rev. F. Staunton on the occasion of the first visit of the Prince of Wales Malger's father, Sir Bryan de Staunton (1040–1100), is the first known member of this family. The family had French origins and it is believed that the mispronunciation in spelling is derived from this. The Staunton Tower at Belvoir Castle is a reminder of the Stauntons' connections. The family maintained Lord of the Manor rights into modern times, and continue to play a role in local affairs through civil parish administration.

=== Railway ===
The Great Northern and London and North Western Joint Railway ran a line from Melton Mowbray railway station (initially Melton) via the Bottesford South junction to Newark North Gate through the western part of the parish, but the nearest station was at Cotham. The line closed in 1987.

== Landmarks ==
=== Staunton Hall ===
Located on the south end of the High Street, the 16th-century Hall is a Grade II* listed building, and is still the Staunton family's main residence.

=== St Mary's Church ===
This stands in the hall grounds and was the family chapel. It is now the parish church for Staunton and Flawborough. The Domesday Book records a church and a priest in the village, but it is unclear if it was on the present site. Certain church features have been dated as far back as the 12th century.

=== Listed buildings ===
Several structures and buildings throughout the parish have listed status, including the hall and church and the Staunton Arms public house from the early 19th century, a vintage telephone kiosk, and a wall with notable features.
