= Thomas Blake (cricketer) =

English cricketer

Personal information
- Full name: Thomas Gage Blake
- Born: 10 April 1805; Midhurst, Sussex, England
- Died: 1895 (aged 89–90); Bury St Edmunds, Suffolk, England
- Role: Wicket-keeper
- Relatives: George Fillingham (nephew); William Blake (nephew)

Domestic team information
- Years: Team
- 1830: Suffolk
- 1830: Sussex
- 1832: MCC

Career statistics
Competition	First-class
Matches	7
Runs scored	102
Batting average	9.27
100s/50s	0/0
Top score	26
Catches/stumpings	3/5
- Source: Cricinfo, 21 June 2012

Thomas Gage Blake (10 April 1805 – 1895) was an English cricketer. He was born at Midhurst, Sussex. Blake's batting style is unknown. He fielded as a wicket-keeper.

Blake made his first-class debut for an England XI against Surrey in 1829. The following season he made two first-class appearances for Suffolk: one against the Marylebone Cricket Club (MCC) at Lord's, and against the same team at Field Lane, Bury St Edmunds. He also made two first-class appearances for Sussex, both against Surrey at The Burys, Godalming and Midhurst Cricket Ground. In 1832, he made two first-class appearances for MCC, with both appearances against the Cambridge Town Club at Chatteris Cricket Ground and Parker's Piece, Cambridge. In total, Blake made seven first-class appearances, scoring 102 runs at an average of 9.27, with a high score of 26. Behind the stumps he took 3 catches and made 5 stumpings.

He died at Bury St Edmunds, Suffolk, in 1895, aged 89 or 90. His nephews, George Fillingham and William Blake, both played first-class cricket.
