= Listed buildings in Elston =

Elston is a civil parish in the Newark and Sherwood district of Nottinghamshire, England. The parish contains ten listed buildings that are recorded in the National Heritage List for England. Of these, one is listed at Grade I, the highest of the three grades, two are at Grade II*, the middle grade, and the others are at Grade II, the lowest grade. The parish contains the village of Elston and the surrounding area. The listed buildings consist of two country houses, smaller houses, two churches, a former windmill, and a coach house.

== Key ==
Grade	Criteria
I	Buildings of exceptional interest, sometimes considered to be internationally important
II*	Particularly important buildings of more than special interest
II	Buildings of national importance and special interest

== Buildings ==
Name and location	Photograph	Date	Notes	Grade
Elston Chapel; 53.02632°N 0.86467°W		12th century	A redundant church, in stone with a tile roof, consisting of a nave and a lower chancel. The south doorway is Norman, and has chevron decoration on the jambs and the arch. Inside the church are box pews, a west gallery, and traces of wall paintings.	I
All Saints' Church; 53.02378°N 0.87014°W		13th century	The church has been altered and extended through the centuries, including restorations in the 19th and 20th centuries. It is built in stone with pantile roofs, and consists of a nave with a clerestory, north and south aisles, a south porch, a chancel, a north vestry and a west tower. The tower is slim, with three stages, a band, and an embattled parapet with eight gargoyles and four crocketed pinnacles. On the north side is a doorway with a hood mould, the bell openings have two lights, above them are two-light windows, and between them on the south side is a clock face. There are also embattled parapets on the nave and aisles, and the porch has a Tudor arched doorway.	II*
Smith's House; 53.02626°N 0.86924°W		Early 17th century	The house, at one time incorporating a shop, has a timber framed core, and is encased in red brick, with some stone and render, on a plinth, and with a pantile roof. There are two storeys and five bays, the right two bays projecting slightly, and to the right is a single-storey four-bay outbuilding. On the front facing the road is a shop window, and elsewhere are doorways, horizontally-sliding sash windows and a casement window.	II
Elston Hall; 53.02320°N 0.87271°W		1756	A country house, later extended, used for a time as a school, and then divided into flats. The original part consists of an H-plan house in blue lias, on a plinth, with quoins, a parapet and a tile roof, and two storeys and attics. The central range has five bays, and the projecting cross-wings are gabled with two bays. In the centre is a doorway with a rusticated architrave, a keystone and a pediment. The windows are sashes, and in the roof are three gabled dormers. To the right is a projecting range in red brick with a slate roof, two storeys and three bays, the outer bays gabled. This has a stone floor band, and sash windows, with a continuous hood mould over the upper floor windows. On each side are later wings with two storeys and balustrades, with four bays on the right, and eight on the left.	II
Hall Farm House; 53.022578°N 0.86991°W	—	Late 18th century	The farmhouse is in red brick and render, and has dentilled eaves and a pantile roof. There are two storeys and an attic, a front range of three bays, a lean-to on the left, and a long lower rear wing. The left bay projects slightly, and there is a floor band on the other bays. The doorway is in the centre, and the windows are horizontally-sliding sashes; all the openings are under segmental arches.	II
Whitehouse; 53.02233°N 0.86752°W	—	Late 18th century	The house, at one time a public house, is in painted red brick on a stone plinth, with an eaves band and a pantile roof. There are two storeys and four bays. Above the doorway is a casement window, and the other windows are horizontally-sliding sash windows under segmental arches.	II
The Hollies; 53.02592°N 0.86799°W		Early 19th century	The house is in red brick with some stone, a floor band, dentilled eaves and a pantile roof. There are two storeys and attics, and three bays. In the centre is a doorway with fluted pilaster strips and a traceried fanlight, and the windows are sash windows. The openings in the lower two floors have flush brick wedge lintels, and the attic windows have cambered heads.	II
The Windmill; 53.02110°N 0.86747°W		1844–45	The tower windmill, which was converted for residential use in 1978, is in red brick. It is tapering, with a circular plan and five storeys. The windmill contains doorways and casement windows, all under segmental arches, and with hood moulds.	II
Elston Towers; 53.02764°N 0.88746°W		1875	A country house, later converted into a spa. It is in yellow and red brick, on a plinth, with some stone, stucco and terracotta, and tile roofs. The main range has five bays, the middle bay with two storeys and the other bays with one. The outer bays are polygonal, each with a dentilled eaves band, decorative iron eaves on brackets, and a pyramidal roof with a decorative iron lantern. The middle bay projects slightly under a coped gable, and has a porch containing a Tudor arched doorway with a moulded surround, and over it is a round-headed window with a hood mould. The bays between contain canted bay windows.	II*
Coach House, Elston Towers; 53.02731°N 0.88707°W		Late 19th century	The coach house is in red and yellow brick on a plinth, with bands of yellow brick and decorative terracotta panels, and a hipped slate roof. There are two storeys and four bays. The openings include triangular doorways and round-headed casement windows, some with hood moulds, and a circular window. On the front are recessed panels with painted shields, and to the right is a four-storey tower with a cornice on brackets.	II
