= Listed buildings in Coddington, Nottinghamshire =

Coddington is a civil parish in the Newark and Sherwood district of Nottinghamshire, England. The parish contains six listed buildings that are recorded in the National Heritage List for England. Of these, one is at Grade II*, the middle of the three grades, and the others are at Grade II, the lowest grade. The parish contains the village of Coddington and the surrounding area, and the listed buildings consist of houses, a church and a former windmill.

== Key ==
Grade	Criteria
II*	Particularly important buildings of more than special interest
II	Buildings of national importance and special interest

== Buildings ==
Name and location	Photograph	Date	Notes	Grade
All Saints' Church; 53.08119°N 0.75495°W		13th century	The oldest part of the church is the tower, and the body of the church was rebuilt in 1864–65 by G. F. Bodley. The church is built in stone with tile roofs, and consists of a nave, north and south aisles, a south porch, a chancel, a vestry, and a west tower. The tower has two stages, a string course, a lancet window, two-light bell openings, and an embattled parapet with corner crocketed pinnacles.	II*
Dovecote Cottage; 53.08030°N 0.75317°W	—	1713	The cottage, converted from a dovecote, is in red brick, and has a roof of tile and pantile, with coped gables and kneelers. There are two storeys, A rectangular plan, two bays, and a single-storey rear extension. The windows are a mix of sashes and casements, and in the middle of the upper floor is an ornamental niche.	II
Old Manor Farmhouse; 53.08068°N 0.75344°W		1713	The farmhouse is in red brick on a rendered stone plinth, with a floor band, and a pantile roof with brick coped gables and kneelers. There are two storeys and attics, and an L-shaped plan, with a main symmetrical range of five bays, an extension on the left with a single storey and an attic, and a two-storey single-bay rear wing. In the centre is a gabled porch with a segmental-arched entrance, above which is an inscribed and dated plaque. The windows are cross-casements, those in the ground floor with segmental heads, and in the rear wing is a stair window. Inside the farmhouse are two inglenook fireplaces.	II
The Laurels; 53.08294°N 0.75310°W	—	Late 18th century	The house is in red brick, with a floor band, dentilled eaves, and a pantile roof with rendered coped gables. There are two storeys and three bays, the middle bay projecting slightly. In the centre is a doorway with a rectangular three-light overlight, a blind traceried fanlight, and a bracketed hood. The windows are horizontally-sliding sashes with segmental heads.	II
Windmill; 53.08119°N 0.75495°W		Late 18th century	The tower windmill is in tarred red brick, it has a circular plan, and four storeys. The windows have segmental heads.	II
The Old Forge; 53.07932°N 0.75804°W	—	c. 1800	A cottage in red brick with some rendering, and a pantile roof. There are two storeys and three bays, and a lean-to porch on the right. The central doorway has a canopy, and the windows are sashes with segmental heads.	II
