= Listed buildings in Kilvington =

Kilvington is a civil parish in the Newark and Sherwood district of Nottinghamshire, England. The parish contains three listed buildings that are recorded in the National Heritage List for England. All the listed buildings are designated at Grade II, the lowest of the three grades, which is applied to "buildings of national importance and special interest". The parish contains the settlement of Kilvington and the surrounding area, and the listed buildings consist of a farmhouse, a house and a church.

== Buildings ==
Name and location	Photograph	Date	Notes
Manor House; 52.97656°N 0.80983°W		Late 18th century	A farmhouse in rendered brick with a belt course, a coped parapet, and a slate roof with stone coped gables. There are two storeys and an attic, three bays, and a rear extension with a pantile roof. In the centre is a doorway with a trellis porch and a rectangular fanlight, and the windows are sashes.
The Homestead; 52.97703°N 0.80966°W	—	c. 1800	A house in chequered red and white brick, with dentilled eaves and a pantile roof. There are two storeys and three bays, the outer bays projecting slightly. In the centre is a doorway with pilasters, a rectangular fanlight, and a flat hood on brackets, and the windows are sashes.
St Mary's Church; 52.97726°N 0.80926°W		1852	The church was rebuilt on the site of an earlier church, and is in Early English style. It is in stone with a tile roof, and consists of a nave, a north aisle, a south porch, a chancel and a west tower. The tower has angle buttresses, a string course, lancet windows, including the bell openings, a cornice with dogtooth decoration, and a pyramidal roof. The windows on the body of the church are also lancets.
