= All Hallows' Church, Ordsall =

All Hallows' Church, Retford
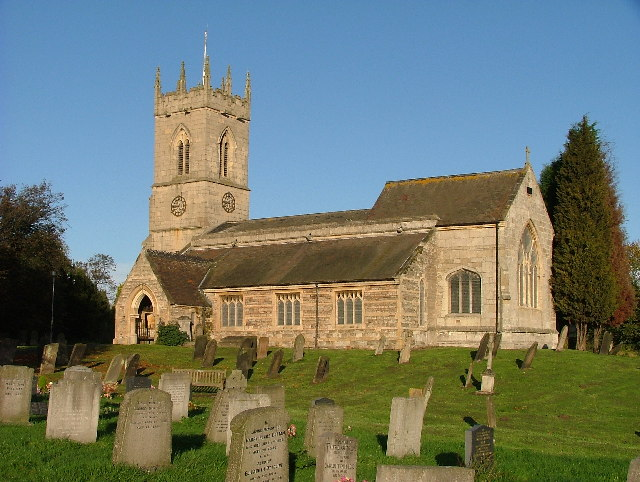
- All Hallows' Church, Retford
- All Hallows' Church, Retford
- 53°18′31.22″N 0°56′41.67″W
- OS grid reference: SK 70435 79719
- Location: Ordsall, Nottinghamshire
- Country: England
- Denomination: Church of England
- Website: achurchnearyou.com

History
- Dedication: All Hallows

Architecture
- Heritage designation: Grade II* listed

Administration
- Province: York
- Diocese: Southwell and Nottingham
- Archdeaconry: Newark
- Deanery: Bassetlaw & Bawtry
- Parish: Ordsall and Retford, St Michael

Clergy
- Bishop(s): The Bishop of Southwell & Nottingham Rt Rev Paul Williams
- Rector: Rev Alex Shiells ( Vicar)

All Hallows' Church is a Grade II* listed parish church in the Church of England in Ordsall, Nottinghamshire.

== History ==
The church dates from the 13th century. It was restored in 1876 by Thomas Chambers Hine and 1880 by Charles Hodgson Fowler.

It is in a parish with St Michael the Archangel, West Retford

== Monuments ==
There is a kneeling monument to Samuel Bevercotes (d. 1603).

== Organ ==
The church has a two manual pipe organ installed in 1877 by Brindley & Foster.

== See also ==
- Grade II* listed buildings in Nottinghamshire
- Listed buildings in Ordsall, Nottinghamshire
