= All Saints' Church, Elston =

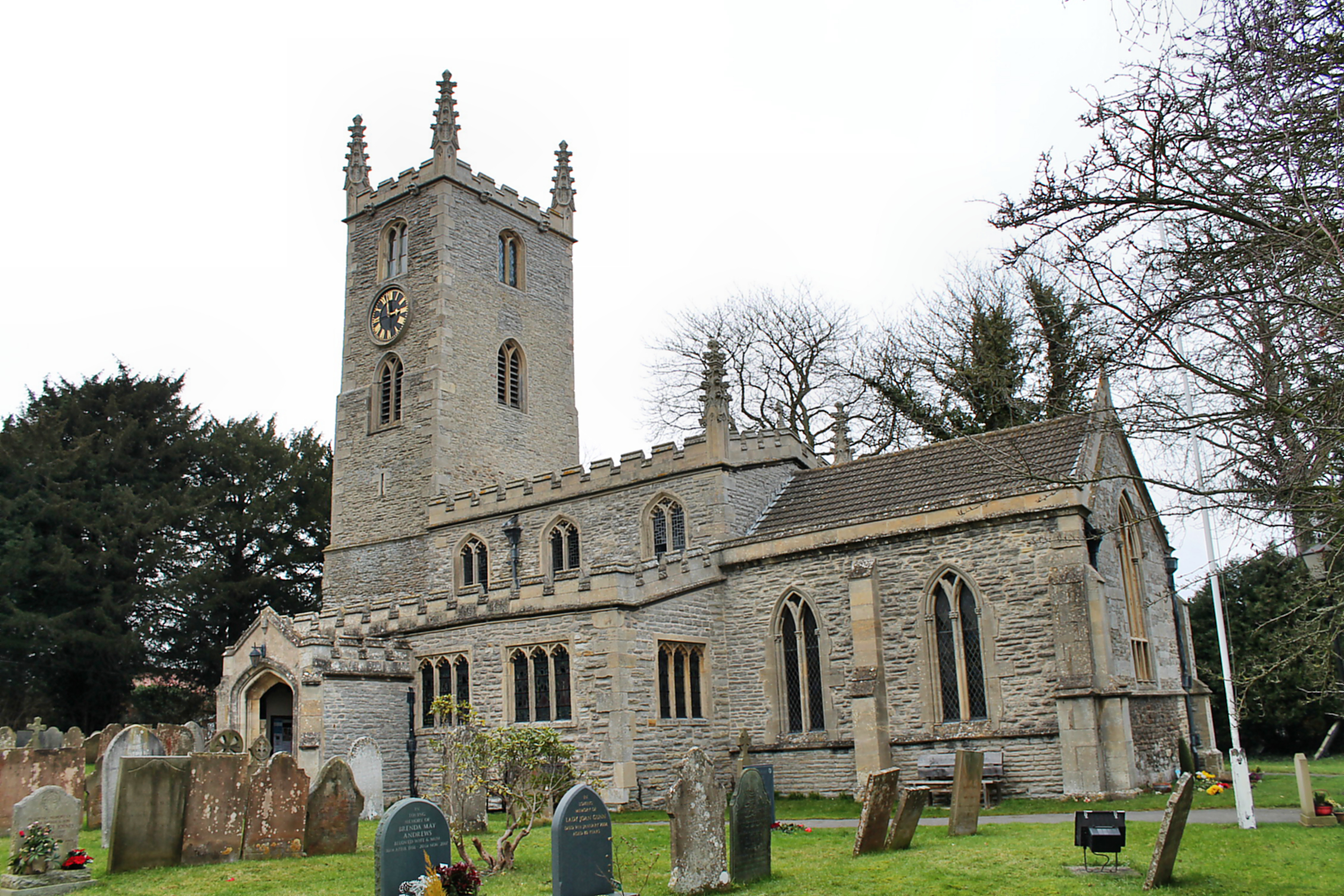
- All Saints' Church, Elston
- All Saints' Church, Elston
- 53°1′22.93″N 0°52′16.96″W
- OS grid reference: SK 75882 47982
- Location: Elston
- Country: England
- Denomination: Church of England

History
- Dedication: All Saints'

Architecture
- Heritage designation: Grade II* listed

Administration
- Diocese: Diocese of Southwell and Nottingham
- Archdeaconry: Newark
- Deanery: Newark and Southwell
- Parish: Elston

All Saints' Church, Elston is a Grade II* listed parish church in the Church of England in Elston, Nottinghamshire, England.

== History ==
The church dates from the 13th century. It was restored in 1837. The chancel was restored and the vestry rebuilt in 1856.

== Memorials ==
Memorials include:

- Rev. John Darwin, 1805, by Wallis, Newark. North chancel
- Will Darwin, 1760. South chancel
- George Chapell, 1766. South nave
- George Lascelles, 1616, Tower arch
- William Alvey Darwin, 1783 by Wallis, Newark. South aisle, west wall
- Jane Darwin, 1835
- Robert Darwin, 1754. North wall
- Robert Waring Darwin, 1816, by Wallis, Newark. North aisle wall
- Elizabeth Hill Darwin, 1804, by Taylor of York
- William Waring, 1835. West wall
- Elizabeth Darwin, 1835, by Tyley, Bristol
- Jane Eleanor Darwin, 1838. South wall
- Ann Darwin, 1813, by Wallis of Newark. Tower, south wall
- Susanna Darwin, 1789 by Wallis of Newark. West wall
- William Darwin 1682
- Rev. John Darwin, 1818, by Wallis and Marshall. North wall

Bust of Erasmus Darwin on marble support, left of altar.

== Organ ==
The organ is by Bishop and Starr dating from 1872. A specification of the organ can be found on the National Pipe Organ Register.

== See also ==
- Grade II* listed buildings in Nottinghamshire
- Listed buildings in Elston
