= Elston Chapel =

Coordinates: 53.0263°N 0.8647°W

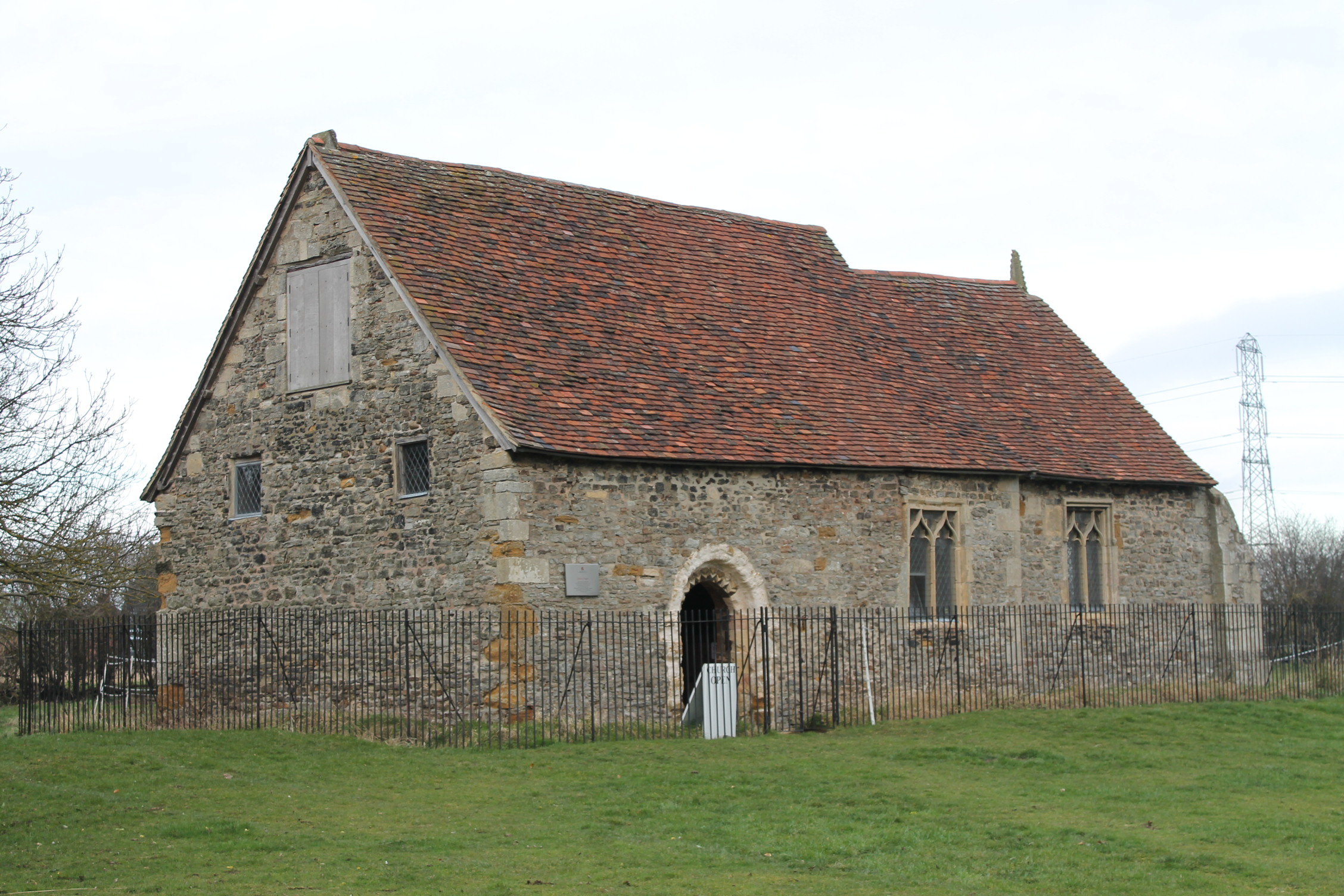
- Elston Chapel from the south-west

- Location in Nottinghamshire
- OS grid reference: SK 762 482
- Location: Elston, Nottinghamshire
- Country: England
- Denomination: Anglican
- Website: Churches Conservation Trust

Architecture
- Functional status: Redundant
- Heritage designation: Grade I
- Designated: 25 February 52
- Architectural type: Church
- Style: Norman, Gothic

Specifications
- Materials: Stone, tiled roofs

Elston Chapel is a redundant Anglican church to the north-east of the village of Elston, Nottinghamshire, England. It is recorded in the National Heritage List for England as a designated Grade I listed building, and is under the care of the Churches Conservation Trust. It stands in a field and is described as a "solitary barn-like chapel".

== History ==
Formerly a parish church, the chapel dates from the 12th century, with additions and alterations made in the 14th and 16th centuries. The chapel was created as a separate parish in 1584 and later became a chapelry to East Stoke. In the early 19th century its interior was fitted with pine pews and a gallery. However, by 1872 it was disused and was transferred to the parish of All Saints, Elston.

There is speculation that the chapel was formerly the chapel of a medieval leper hospital dedicated to Saint Leonard. The church was declared redundant on 23 September 1976, and was vested in the Churches Conservation Trust on 9 February 1976.

== Architecture ==
The chapel is constructed in coursed rubble stone with tile roofs, and consists of a nave and a smaller and lower chancel. In the west wall are two small rectangular windows with a larger rectangular window above. In the north wall of the nave is a two-light window with ogee arches and, to the east in a slightly projecting bay is a single-light window with a pointed arch. The north wall of the chancel contains a two-light window under a flat arch. The east end of the chancel has buttresses, and contains a three-light window with ogee arches under a flat head. The date 1577 is inscribed over the window, and at the apex of the gable is the fragment of a cross. The south wall of the chancel and the nave both contain a two-light window under ogee arches. The south doorway dates from the 12th century, and is in Norman style with a round arch and zigzag decoration. Inside the church fragments of the 19th-century fittings still present. There are several layers of paintings on the walls, including Georgian biblical texts and, on the north wall, a large royal coat of arms.

== See also ==
- List of churches preserved by the Churches Conservation Trust in the English Midlands
- Grade I listed buildings in Nottinghamshire
- Listed buildings in Elston
