= Listed buildings in Ordsall, Nottinghamshire =

Ordsall is a village in the Bassetlaw District of Nottinghamshire, England, near the market town of Retford. The village contains seven listed buildings that are recorded in the National Heritage List for England. Of these, one is at Grade II*, the middle of the three grades, and the others are at Grade II, the lowest grade. The listed buildings consist of a church, its former rectory, a war memorial in the churchyard, and houses and cottages with associated structures.

== Key ==
Grade	Criteria
II*	Particularly important buildings of more than special interest
II	Buildings of national importance and special interest

== Buildings ==
Name and location	Photograph	Date	Notes	Grade
All Hallows' Church; 53.30975°N 0.94441°W		13th century	The church has been altered and extended through the centuries, including a restoration in 1823, and later alterations in 1876–77 by T. C. Hine, and in 1880 by C. Hodgson Fowler. The church is built in stone with tile roofs, and consists of a nave, north and south aisles with end chapels, a south porch, a taller chancel, and a west tower. The tower has three stages, diagonal buttresses, a west door and a three-light west window, clock faces in the middle stage, two-light bell openings in the top stage, and an embattled parapet with eight pinnacles. The porch has short attached columns with foliate capitals.	II*
Ordsall House; 53.30917°N 0.94567°W	—	c. 1820	A rectory, later a private house, it is in brick, rendered and painted, and has a hipped slate roof with overhanging eaves. There are two storeys, an east front of three bays and a south front of four bays. The east front has pilaster strips, and a central porch with Ionic columns. The windows on both fronts are sashes.	II
43–47 All Hallows Street; 53.30990°N 0.94398°W		Early 19th century	A row of three cottages of differing heights, curving along the street, they are in red brick with dentilled eaves cornices, and pantile roofs, and have two storeys. Most of the doorways have segmental heads, and the windows are sashes, most horizontally-sliding, and most with segmental heads.	II
96 and 98 All Hallows Street and outbuildings 53.31042°N 0.94578°W	—	Early 19th century	A house and outbuildings around a courtyard in red brick, with dentilled eaves cornices and pantile roofs. The house is painted and has a hipped roof, two storeys, and an L-shaped plan, with a range of three bays and a cross wing. The central doorway has a moulded surround and a rectangular fanlight, it is flanked by canted bay windows, and the other windows are hung sashes. The outbuildings have a single storey and some of the windows have segmental heads.	II
The Grange; 53.30686°N 0.94532°W		Early 19th century	The house is in red brick with a floor band, a diagonally-set and dentilled eaves cornice, and a pantile roof. There are three storeys, three bays, and a two-storey two-bay rear wing. The central doorway has a grooved surround with paterae and a cornice. It is flanked by canted bay windows, and the other windows are hung sashes.	II
Former school hall 53.30850°N 0.94346°W		Mid 19th century	The school hall, which has been converted for residential use, is stuccoed, on a plinth, with a hipped Welsh slate roof. There is a single storey, and an L-shaped plan with a front of three bays. The doorway has a segmental head, and the windows are hung sashes with hood moulds.	II
War memorial 53.30973°N 0.94521°W		1951	The war memorial is in the churchyard of All Hallows' Church. It is in Cornish granite and is about 1.25 metres (4 ft 1 in) high. The memorial consists of a wheel-head Celtic cross on a short shaft, rising from a roughly-finished tapering plinth. On the front is a panel with an inscription relating to the two World Wars.	II
