= Listed buildings in Flawborough =

Flawborough is a civil parish in the Rushcliffe district of Nottinghamshire, England. The parish contains five listed buildings that are recorded in the National Heritage List for England. All the listed buildings are designated at Grade II, the lowest of the three grades, which is applied to "buildings of national importance and special interest". The parish contains the village of Flawborough and the surrounding countryside. The listed buildings are all in the village, and consist of a church, headstones in the churchyard, and a farmhouse.

== Buildings ==
Name and location	Photograph	Date	Notes
Stonehouse Farmhouse; 52.97653°N 0.83305°W	—	1700	The farmhouse, which was later extended, is in red brick, partly rendered, partly on a plinth, with cogged and dentilled eaves, and roof of tile and pantile with coped gables. There are two storeys and attics, and an L-shaped plan, with a garden front of three bays, and seven bays along the street, including two later two-bay extensions. On the garden front is a doorway with a segmental head, the doorway on the street front has a round-arched head and a hood on brackets, and the windows are a mix of casements and sashes, some horizontally-sliding, and some with segmental heads.
Pair of headstones 10 metres south of the chancel 52.97734°N 0.83642°W		1715	The two headstones in the churchyard of St Peter's Church are in slate, and are to the memory of members of the Mitchell family. Each headstone has a square head, one has an incised angel's head and an hourglass, the other has two angels' heads, and both have inscriptions.
Pair of headstones 7 metres south of the chancel 52.97738°N 0.83632°W		1720	The two headstones in the churchyard of St Peter's Church are in slate, they are to the memory of members of the Smith family, and are arranged back-to-back. One has an incised angel and text, the other has an incised angel flanked by an hourglass and cross bones, and an inscription.
Pair of headstones 10 metres south of the nave 52.97734°N 0.83642°W		1728	The two headstones in the churchyard of St Peter's Church are in slate, and are to the memory of Hannah Cooke and Page Smith. One is slightly tapered, and the other has a square head. Both headstones have incised angels and inscriptions.
St Peter's Church; 52.97741°N 0.83649°W		1840	The church was restored in 1892 when the vestry was added. It is built in brick with, stone dressings and a slate roof. The church consists of a nave, a lower chancel, a vestry and a west tower. The tower has three stages two string courses, clasping buttresses, moulded eaves, and a coped parapet with corner pinnacles. At the west end is a re-set Norman doorway with two orders of colonnettes, and two orders of chevrons, above which is a datestone, and on the north side is a round stair turret with a conical roof.
