= Listed buildings in Sibthorpe =

Sibthorpe is a civil parish in the Rushcliffe district of Nottinghamshire, England. In the parish are two listed buildings that are recorded in the National Heritage List for England, both of which are listed at Grade I, the highest of the three grades. The parish contains the village of Sibthorpe and the surrounding countryside. Both the listed buildings are to the south of the village, and consist of a church and a pigeoncote.

== Key ==
Grade	Criteria
I	Buildings of exceptional interest, sometimes considered to be internationally important

== Buildings ==
Name and location	Photograph	Date	Notes	Grade
St Peter's Church; 53.00061°N 0.86312°W		13th century	The church has been altered and extended through the centuries. It is built in stone with tile roofs, and consists of a nave, a south porch, a chancel, a vestry and a west tower. The tower has two stages, corner buttresses with chamfered plinths, a string course, moulded eaves and a plain parapet. On the west front is a doorway with moulded imposts and a hood mould, and the upper stage contains paired lancet bell openings, a vesica piscis and a hood mould. Inside the chancel is an Easter Sepulchre.	I
Pigeoncote; 53.00043°N 0.86155°W		14th century	The pigeoncote is in stone with a conical tile roof and a square lead cap. It consists of a circular tapering tower with two stages, containing a chamfered string course, and a doorway with stone jambs, a timber lintel and an oak plank door.	I
