= George Fillingham =

English cricketer

Personal information
- Full name: George Henry Fillingham
- Born: 24 August 1841; Newark, Nottinghamshire, England
- Died: 17 January 1895 (aged 53); Newark, Nottinghamshire, England
- Relatives: Thomas Blake (uncle)

Career statistics
Competition	First-class
Matches	1
Runs scored	0
Batting average	0.00
100s/50s	0/0
Top score	0
Catches/stumpings	2/–
- Source: Cricinfo, 4 May 2021

George Henry Fillingham JP (24 August 1841 – 17 January 1895) was an English first-class cricketer and administrator.

The son of George Fillingham senior, he was born in August 1841 at Syerston Hall in Syerston, Nottinghamshire. He was educated at Harrow School, where he played for the cricket eleven, before going up to St John's College, Oxford. He played a single first-class cricket match for the Gentlemen of the South against the Gentlemen of the North at Beeston in 1870, batting once in the match and being dismissed without scoring by A. N. Hornby; he was one of five ducks in the Gentlemen of the South first innings. He was a well known patron of cricket in Nottinghamshire, serving on the committee of Nottinghamshire County Cricket Club and later as its president. Fillingham was also a founder of the Gentlemen of Nottinghamshire team. Outside of cricket, he was a justice of the peace. Fillingham died at Syerston in January 1895, six weeks after being shot in a hunting accident. His uncle was the cricketer Thomas Blake.
