= Flawborough =

Hamlet and civil parish in Nottinghamshire, England

Coordinates: 52.9774°N 0.8355°W

- Hamlet and civil parish
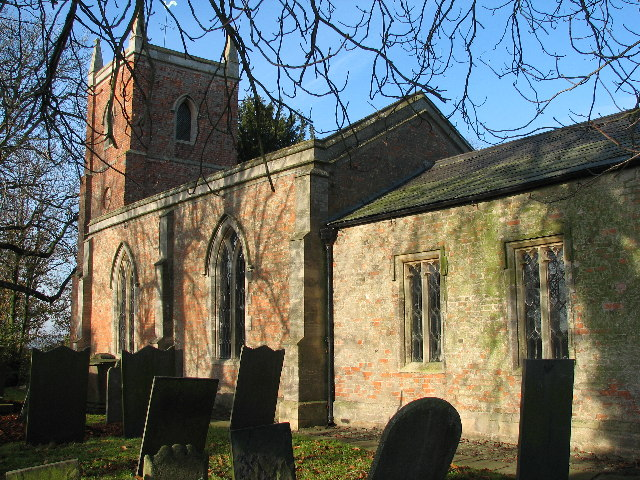
- Church of St Peter, Flawborough

- Location within Nottinghamshire
- Interactive map of Flawborough
- Area: 1.53 sq mi (4.0 km^{2})
- Population: 67 (2021 census)
  - Density: 44/sq mi (17/km^{2})
- OS grid reference: SK 78287 42860
  - London: 100 mi (160 km) SSE
- District: Rushcliffe
- Shire county: Nottinghamshire
- Region: East Midlands
- Country: England
- Sovereign state: United Kingdom
- Post town: NOTTINGHAM
- Postcode district: NG13
- Dialling code: 01949
- Police: Nottinghamshire
- Fire: Nottinghamshire
- Ambulance: East Midlands
- UK Parliament: Rushcliffe

Flawborough is a hamlet and civil parish in the Rushcliffe borough of Nottinghamshire, England.

== Geography ==
The settlement is situated 7 miles south of Newark-on-Trent, at the northern tip of the Vale of Belvoir. Alverton is half a mile to the east, and Shelton is a mile to the north. For the 2021 census its population is 67 residents, previously its population was reported together with nearby Sibthorpe/Top Green and Shelton as having a total of 307 residents in 2011.

Comprising mainly farmland, this linear village has a single primary road through its centre (Main Street) and one minor (Shelton Lane). It is approached along the crest of a hill (39 metres (128 ft), highest point) from its southern boundary by Longhedge Lane, and the farmland falls away to its western boundary, the River Smite. This is a deep channel, with normally only 12 inches of water, but as it is the vale of Belvoir's “drain” it can rapidly rise over twenty feet and flood. At the northern tip of the parish, the River Smite joins the River Devon, also from the Vale of Belvoir.

There is evidence of old quarry workings in the east of the parish.

== History ==
Key buildings include the unused Grade II listed, nineteenth-century rebuilt Church of St Peter, and Flawborough Hall which was once owned by Major Edward Harold Spalding, a partner in the Griffin & Spalding department store in the Old Market Square of Nottingham. The business was subsequently bought out by and rebranded to Debenhams. Spalding later became the High Sheriff of Nottinghamshire in 1951. The Hall is now the operating premises for a local farm.

Dallington was a nearby tiny community, but by the nineteenth century was virtually deserted and considered to be a lost village. Both it and Flawborough were notable enough to be recorded in the Domesday Book of 1086. The wider area at the turn of the century was held by the Duke of Newcastle who was Lord of the manor and sole landowner.

== See also ==
- Listed buildings in Flawborough
