= Kilton, Nottinghamshire =

Suburban area of Worksop, Nottinghamshire, England

Coordinates: 53°18′48″N 1°06′34″W

Kilton
- Suburb
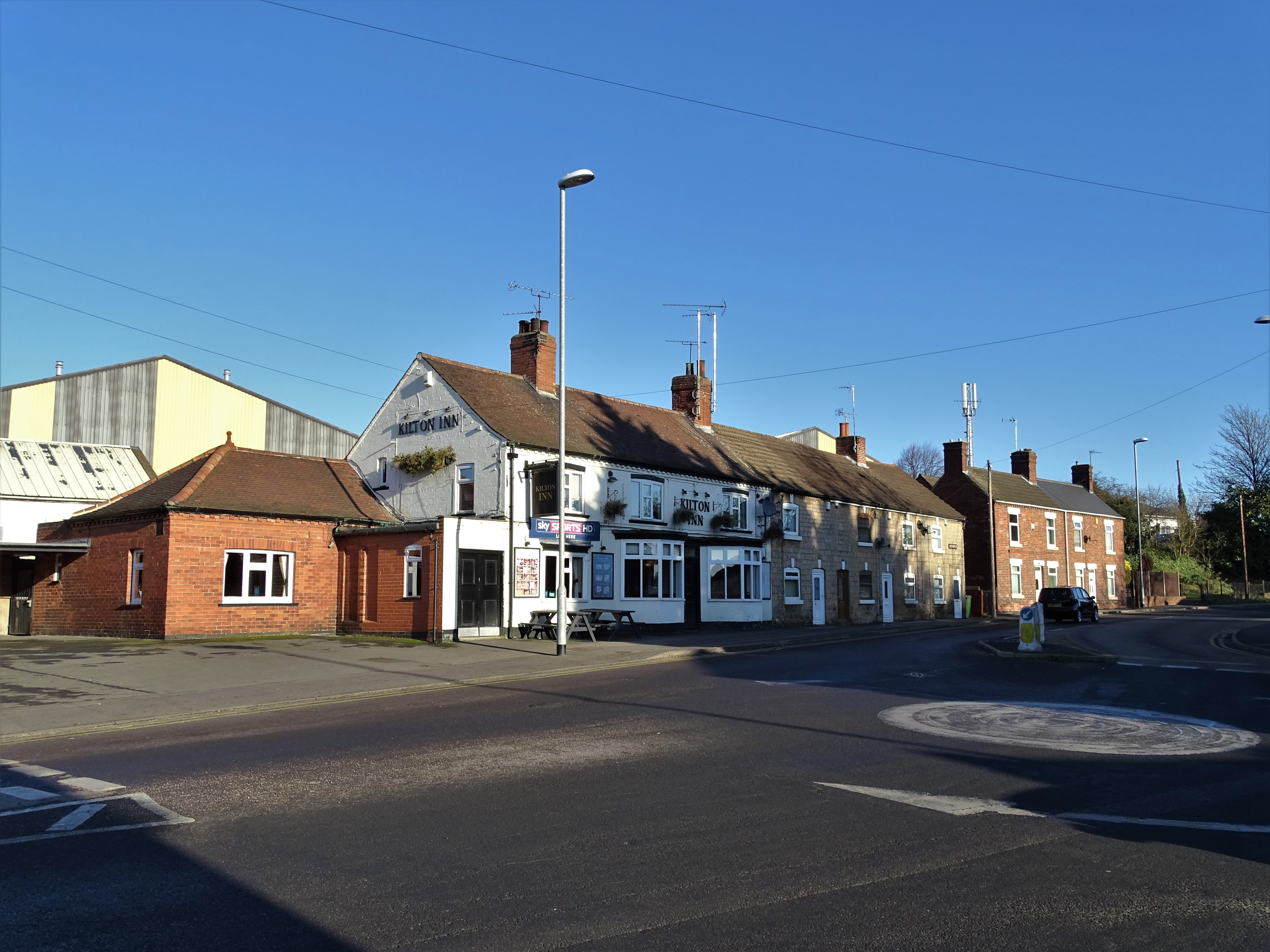
- Kilton Road

- Location within Nottinghamshire
- OS grid reference: SK570812
- District: Bassetlaw
- Shire county: Nottinghamshire
- Region: East Midlands
- Country: England
- Sovereign state: United Kingdom
- Post town: WORKSOP
- Postcode district: S81
- Dialling code: 01909
- Police: Nottinghamshire
- Fire: Nottinghamshire
- Ambulance: East Midlands

Kilton is a large suburban area in the northeast of the market town of Worksop, in the Bassetlaw district, in the county of Nottinghamshire, England. It consists of a series of large post-World War II housing developments, some of which are council estates.

== History ==
The suburb was, since the late nineteenth century, home to Kilton Hospital, which was, along with Victoria Hospital, located on Memorial Avenue in Worksop, one of the town's main hospitals. The hospital existed until the late 1980s, at a time when it chiefly dealt with maternity. Today the surviving main building, with its yellow brick facade, and stag frieze in its pediment, has been incorporated into Bassetlaw District General Hospital, which is located just behind it, and now used as the administration block.

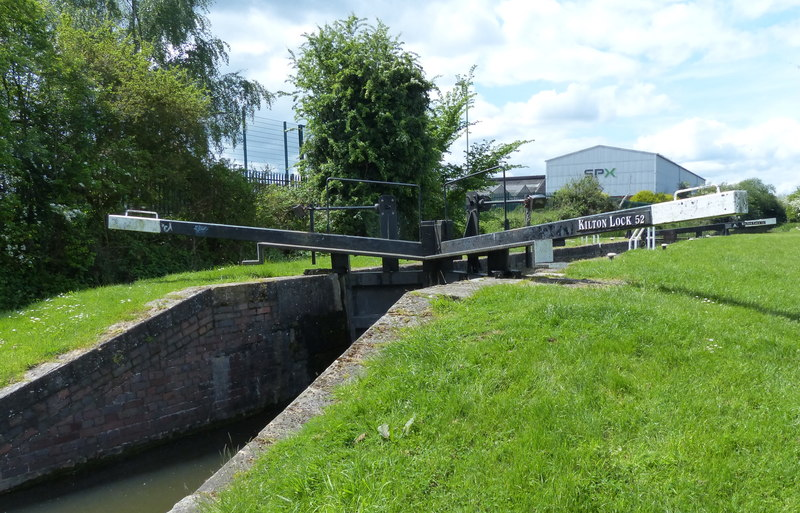
Kilton Lock
