= Sibthorpe =

Village and civil parish in Nottinghamshire, England

Coordinates: 53.00°N 0.86°W

- Village and civil parish
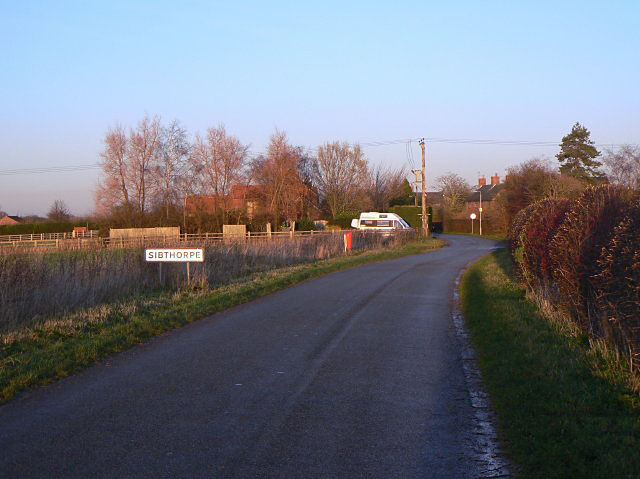
- Sibthorpe from Newfield Lane

- Location within Nottinghamshire
- Interactive map of Sibthorpe
- Area: 1.48 sq mi (3.8 km^{2})
- Population: 123 (2021)
  - Density: 83/sq mi (32/km^{2})
- OS grid reference: SK 763454
  - London: 105 mi (169 km) SSE
- District: Rushcliffe
- Shire county: Nottinghamshire
- Region: East Midlands
- Country: England
- Sovereign state: United Kingdom
- Post town: NEWARK
- Postcode district: NG23
- Dialling code: 01777
- Police: Nottinghamshire
- Fire: Nottinghamshire
- Ambulance: East Midlands
- UK Parliament: Newark

Sibthorpe is a village and civil parish in the borough of Rushcliffe, in Nottinghamshire, England. There is no parish council, only a parish meeting. 123 residents were reported at the 2021 census.

== Toponymy ==
The place-name Sibthorpe seems to contain an Old Norse personal name, Sibba, + þorp (Old Norse), A secondary settlement, a dependent outlying farmstead or hamlet, so probably, "Sibba's outlying farm/settlement".

Sibthorpe appears in the Domesday survey of 1086 as Sibetorp.

== History ==
According to Francis White's Directory of Nottinghamshire of 1853, Sibthorpe,

"lies on the Cardike, 7 miles (11 km) south-south-west of Newark, and was once a place of considerable importance, having a college founded by Geffrey de Scroop, in the reign of Edward II. It was also for a long time the residence of the Burnell family, who had a large mansion here, of which nothing now remains. The lordships contains 908 acres (3.67 km^{2}) of land, a tithe-free estate of the rateable value of £1,721, and 154 inhabitants, and is all the property of the Duke of Portland, who is also patron of the living, which is enjoyed by the Rev. John Ince Maltby of Shelton. The church, dedicated to St Peter, is a donative of the certified value of £20. It is an ancient edifice, and was originally much larger than it is at present. It has a spacious chancel, in which is a monument of Edward Burnell, the date on which is 1589, and in black letters are inserted, "By me, Barbara Burnell, God grant us a joyful resurrection." In the church-yard is a stone erected to the memory of four children of the name of Hall, who died in infancy, at the foot of which are these lines: 'The cup of life just with their lips they pressed, They found it bitter and declined the rest. Averse, then, turning from the face of day, They softly sighed their little souls away'. A neat Wesleyan chapel, built of wood, and standing on wheels, was opened for service in July 1844."

Sibthorpe has two or three points of historical interest:

1. the church of St. Peter;
2. a fine mediaeval dovecote, still standing to this day
3. a college of priests attached to the church, founded in 1320 by Geoffrey le Scrope, and a few years later augmented by Thomas de Sibthorpe, the parson of Beckingham.

According to Thoroton, the College had a priest and eight or nine chaplains, who officiated "daily at the neighbouring chapels and churches of Syerston, Elston, Thoroton, and Aslockton. No traces of the college are left, except the fish-ponds on the south side of the church, and the dovecote." A recent photograph of the dovecote can be seen.

Regarding Sibthorpe College, "we have some evidence of the dimensions of the building in a letter written by Thomas Magnus, who was warden of the college in the reign of Henry VIII, to Cardinal Thomas Wolsey." "When the Valor Ecclesiasticus was drawn up in 1534, Thomas Magnus was warden of Sibthorpe."

== See also ==
- Listed buildings in Sibthorpe
