= Redhill, Nottinghamshire =

Coordinates: 53.012°N 1.134°W

Redhill
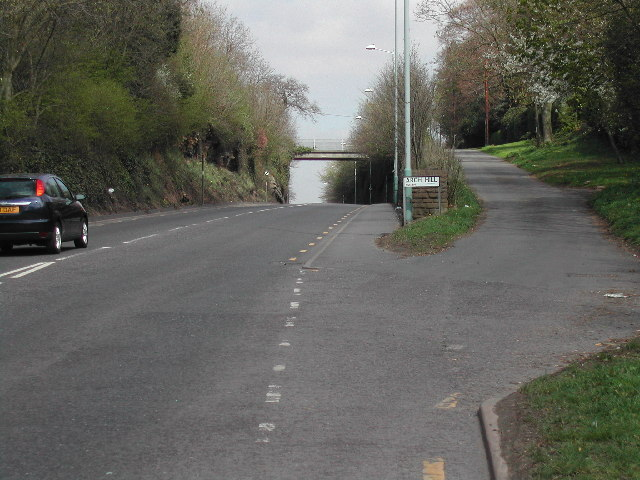
- Arch Hill, Redhill

- Location within Nottinghamshire
- Population: 2,000 (approx)
- OS grid reference: SK 58095 46461
- Civil parish: mainly unparished
- District: Borough of Gedling
- Shire county: Nottinghamshire
- Region: East Midlands
- Country: England
- Sovereign state: United Kingdom
- Post town: Nottingham
- Postcode district: NG5
- Dialling code: 0115
- Police: Nottinghamshire
- Fire: Nottinghamshire
- Ambulance: East Midlands
- UK Parliament: Gedling

Redhill (/rɛdˈhɪl/) is a small community in Nottinghamshire, England. It is approximately 4 miles (6.4 km) north of the city of Nottingham in the borough of Gedling. The area is home to approximately 2,000 people, many of whom are commuters. The population is shown in the Gedling ward of Bonington. Community is also connected to the market town of Arnold.

== Facilities ==
Although there is no commercial centre to Redhill, there is Redhill Academy, a specialist performing arts school, Redhill Leisure Centre and Redhill Stores and a newsagent. There are also two pubs: ‘The Ram Inn’ and ‘The Waggon And Horses’. Redhill also hosts the nearest municipal cemetery for the residents of the Greater Arnold area. Redhill also boasts a unisex hairdressing salon, two car servicing garages and a used car dealership.

== Bus services ==
Nottingham City Transport

- 87: Nottingham - Sherwood- City Hospital - Edwards Lane - Redhill - Arnold

Stagecoach

- Pronto: Chesterfield - Mansfield - Nottingham
- Sherwood Arrow: Worksop - Retford - Ollerton -Nottingham

== History ==
It is generally accepted by historians that Redhill takes its name from the clay-like red soil making up the hill at the centre of the community. Running through Redhill is the primary road leading north out of Nottingham, now named Mansfield Road, which is part of the A60. Prior to c. 1800 it was considered to be the southern limit of Sherwood Forest. A professional guide to lead travellers safely through the forest to Mansfield could be hired from the now-demolished ‘Guide House’, which stood on the eastern side of Mansfield Road to the north of Roscoe Avenue.
