= Ordsall, Nottinghamshire =

Coordinates: 53.31°N 0.95°W

Ordsall
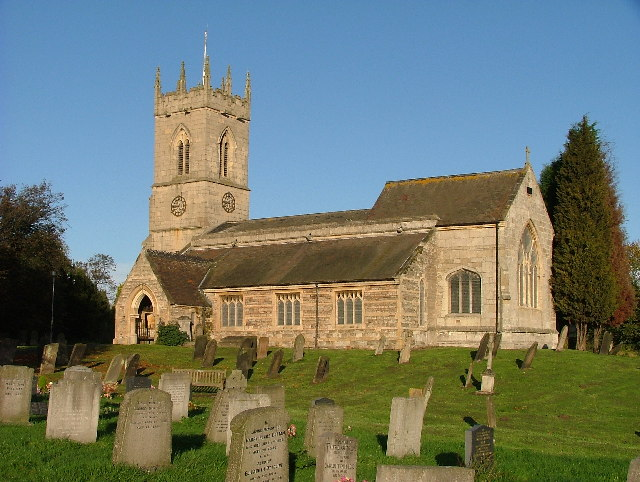
- All Hallows' Church, Ordsall

- Location within Nottinghamshire
- Population: 14,194 (Ward 2011)
- District: Bassetlaw
- Shire county: Nottinghamshire
- Region: East Midlands
- Country: England
- Sovereign state: United Kingdom
- Post town: RETFORD
- Postcode district: DN22
- Dialling code: 01777
- Police: Nottinghamshire
- Fire: Nottinghamshire
- Ambulance: East Midlands
- UK Parliament: Bassetlaw

Ordsall is an area and former civil parish in Retford, in the Bassetlaw district of Nottinghamshire, England. The Bassetlaw ward of the same name had a population of 14,194 at the 2011 census.

All Hallows' Church serves the village and is situated beside the River Idle at the south side of Ordsall, an area sometimes referred to as "Old Ordsall". The River Idle, along with the Great Northern Rail Line, divides Ordsall from Retford.

Ordsall is served by Ordsall Primary School, which is on Ordsall Road and from the age of 11 school children have the option of going to one of Retford's two secondary schools, Retford Oaks High School or Elizabethen High School.

The football team 'Ordsall Rangers' is the village football team.

== History ==
There is no record of Ordsall before the days of William the Conqueror, when the land was chiefly marsh. In the Domesday Book of 1086, the name of the village is Ordeshale and in other early documents the name was Ordesale. In 1637 it was even printed on a map as Ardsall, however these corruptions of names are usual everywhere.

For centuries the parish of Ordsall consisted of the village and two small hamlets, Thrumpton and Whitehouses. Ordsall Parish became part of the Retford Area Team Ministry, the area covered by the former Retford Deanery, in April 2011. The ecclesiastical parish of Ordsall formerly covered a much larger area than Ordsall village. Whereas the village is bounded by the river and railway lines, the parish extended northwards towards the centre of East Retford as far as Albert Road. On 1 September 2019 a new Parish of Ordsall and Retford, St Michael was formed. This new parish comprises all the parts of the former Ordsall parish that lie on western bank of the river Idle, along with the ancient parish of West Retford. The areas of the ancient Ordsall Parish that lie on the eastern bank of the river Idle are now part of the Parish of Retford, St Saviours.

The ancient parish became a civil parish in 1866, but on 1 April 1921 the civil parish was abolished and absorbed into the Municipal Borough of East Retford. In 1911 the civil parish had a population of 5690.

=== Population ===
The population of the Parish, which includes the village of Ordsall and surrounding areas such as Thrumpton. The 2001 population is the population of the village alone.

Year	Population
1801	560
1811	599
1821	632
1831	809
1841	955
1851	1,342
1881	3,011
1891	3,852
1901	5,199
1911	5,690
2001	4,328
2011	4,215

== All Hallows Church ==
The Anglican church, All Hallows is a Grade II* listed building. The first recorded rector is in 1277. The current building dates from that period but was rebuilt in the 19th century by TC Hine of Nottingham. The church has a short, square tower with diagonal buttresses that is thought to date from the 15th century. The upper parts of the tower had to be repaired in 1823 after it was struck by lightning.

The church's east window is by Camm Brothers of Smethwick and dates from 1877, as is the window in the north aisle east (1881). In the chancel there is a window by James Powell and Sons (Flint memorial, 1923) and another by Charles Eamer Kempe (Hall memorial, 1905). There are a number of unusual brass plates in the south aisle, dating from the 17th and 18th centuries. In the north aisle is a memorial made of Nottinghamshire alabaster with kneeling figure between Corinthian columns (c 1600–20).

== See also ==
- Listed buildings in Ordsall, Nottinghamshire
