= Gateford =

Village in Nottinghamshire, England

Coordinates: 53.33°N 1.15°W

- Village
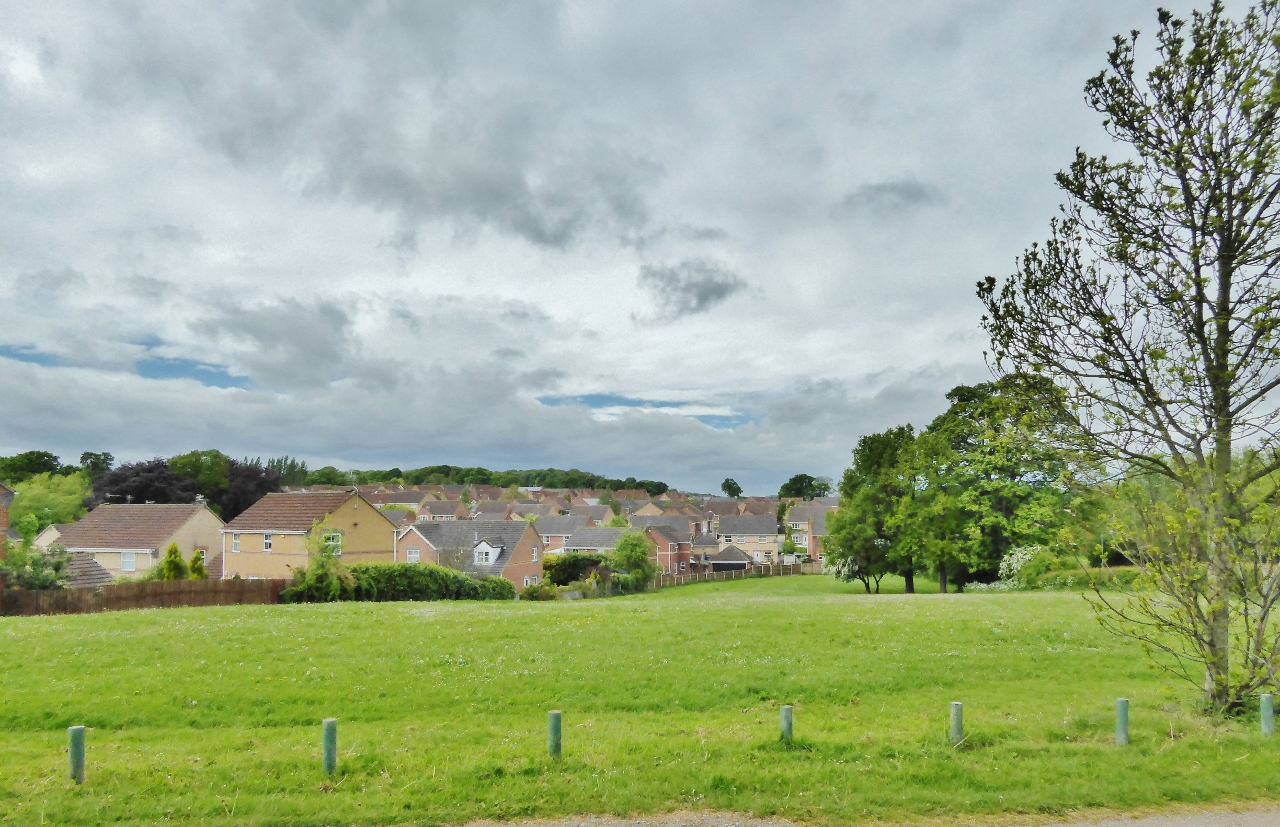
- Pleasant Wide Parkland

- Location within Nottinghamshire
- Population: 900 (2001)
- OS grid reference: SK570812
- District: Bassetlaw
- Shire county: Nottinghamshire
- Region: East Midlands
- Country: England
- Sovereign state: United Kingdom
- Post town: WORKSOP
- Postcode district: S81
- Dialling code: 01909
- Police: Nottinghamshire
- Fire: Nottinghamshire
- Ambulance: East Midlands

Gateford is a village in Nottinghamshire, England. It is located 1 mile north-west of Worksop.

== Topography ==
Irregular undulations caused by fluvio-glacial movement in the last Ice Age characterise the landform of Gateford. This landform is identified as Lower Mottled Sandstone, a division of the Sherwood Sandstone that dates back to the Triassic period. Gateford falls within the Sandstone Estatelands of the Sherwood Regional Character Area 4, and for many years boasted a sand quarry. To the north of Gateford, the countryside merges into the Magnesian Limestone Ridge that runs along the western edge of Nottinghamshire.

== History ==
Gateford was first recorded by name as Gattef (meaning goats’ ford), circa 1130. Archaeological information however reveals a longstanding human settlement in the Gateford landscape, and to the north of the village there are three circular cropmarks thought to be Bronze Age barrows. A bronze-flanged axe was discovered at Gateford Farm in 1962. Irregular fields, lanes and settlement enclosures in the same area are thought to reflect a Romano-British rural landscape (A.D. 43-410), with various Roman period artefacts having been unearthed, including coins from the reign of Nero and Domitian, which were uncovered at Gateford Hall in the early 19th century. These conclusions were backed up in 2013 by the University of Leicester Archaeological Services (ULAS), who conducted a geophysical survey of the site in thirteen trenches, many of which contained Romano-British pottery dating back from the 2nd century AD. They also discovered linear features representing enclosure ditches and gullies, most likely associated with the outlying enclosures of an Iron Age or Romano-British farm. The later village grew from lands on the estate of Gateford Hall, the medieval moated manor house which was largely rebuilt in the 17th century, and is now a Grade II listed building. Gateford's present day boundaries are Gateford Road (A57), Owday Lane, Carlton Road (A60) and Raymoth Lane.

Gateford is steeped in an almost hidden away history that at times seems hard to find, and since 1995 has been largely redeveloped to become a very modern looking community, specifically relating to the building of thousands of new homes and that of the Celtic Point shopping area. This said, its charm and character remain, with acres of woodland, ponds and streams, together with an abundance of wildlife, and agricultural farm land, beset with the backdrop of Gateford Hill, which in turn covers a large swathe of the landscape. A separate Gateford Hill (the manor house that was Gateford Hall), boasts an attractive private, unregistered historic park and garden, with a wide range of large mature trees. Gateford's green areas include Eddison Plantation, Sand Hill Plantation, Keeper's Ashes, Hardwick Ashes, Little Broom Wood, Nab's Ashes Woods, Whipman Wood, Owday Plantation and Owday Woods.

A number of historical and architecturally important buildings were designated as the Old Gateford Conservation Area on 4 February 2009, that includes the aforementioned Gateford Hall, Gateford Hill House, California Farm, the 18th and 19th century cottages on Old Gateford Road, a number of outbuildings, Ivy Cottage, Otley Cottage, Forge House, a small industrial area known as ‘the Smithy’ and a listed icehouse associated with Gateford House.

Numerous public footpaths link Gateford to its neighbouring villages and to the town of Worksop.

The community is served by Gateford Park Primary School with a second school due to open on Gatekeeper Way in September 2024. Gateford Park Primary School's Key Stage 2 indoor athletics team became the district champions in 2012. Gateford's village sign was created by schoolchildren based on local Roman finds.

The Roman's Rest public house provides regular live entertainment and a good food selection.

Gateford formed part of the manor of Worksop that was given as a reward to Roger de Busli by William the Conqueror. It was subsequently passed on to Sir William de Lovetot, who subin-feuded it to the family who derived their surname from it, the Gateford's (Also spelt as de Gaytef or Gayteford). Nearby Worksop Priory was founded in 1103 but its charter of foundation was written much later (circa 1123-1139). Among those attesting witness to the charter are "Gilbert de Gaytef, and to the quitclaim of Matilda de Lovetot to that establishment, William de Gateford." Gateford Hall became the family seat, with a moat being added in the thirteenth or fourteenth century. In feudal Anglo-Norman England and Ireland, a knight's fee was a unit measure of land deemed sufficient to support a knight, and it is known that, "John de Gateford, in the 6th year of Edward III (1333), held the fourth part of a knight’s fee in Gateford." Thomas de Gayteford held the manor of Gayteford, in the 40th year of the same reign (1367). In 1636, Harrison's Survey, has the following entry, ""Gatefirth, Sir George Lascelles, for his chief rent out of Gaytforth, £5 4s. 8d." The de Gatefords held the property for more than 300 years, when the last of that name, John Gaitford, left two daughters, one of whom was married to Thomas Knight, Esq., and the other to John Townley. In Thoroton, in 16th year of Henry VII (1501), a fine was said to have been levied settling the issue of the ownership of Gateford, first upon Elizabeth, "the wife of T. Knight, and his heirs", and next upon the wife of John Townley, and his heirs. It would seem that the heirs of the former shortly parted with their share, for Leland states that in the reign of Henry VIII, Townley was then in possession of Gateford. Within various marriages, the manor house would then pass to the Pilkingtons, the Lascelles, and the Rodes, the latter of whom had the hall converted into a tenanted farm and the parkland used for grazing. The manor house was altered and extended in the later-17th century, but much of the original timber framing survives behind the later stonework. The hamlet of Gateford evolved in the 18th and 19th centuries on the Workshop to Sheffield turnpike. A tollhouse once sat on the western limit of Gateford on the south side of Gateford Road, reflecting the importance of this entrance into Worksop. The hall was subsequently owned by the Vessey's, the Machin's and the present Vessey-Machin's.
