= Manton, Nottinghamshire =

Coordinates: 53.30°N 1.11°W

Manton
- Suburb
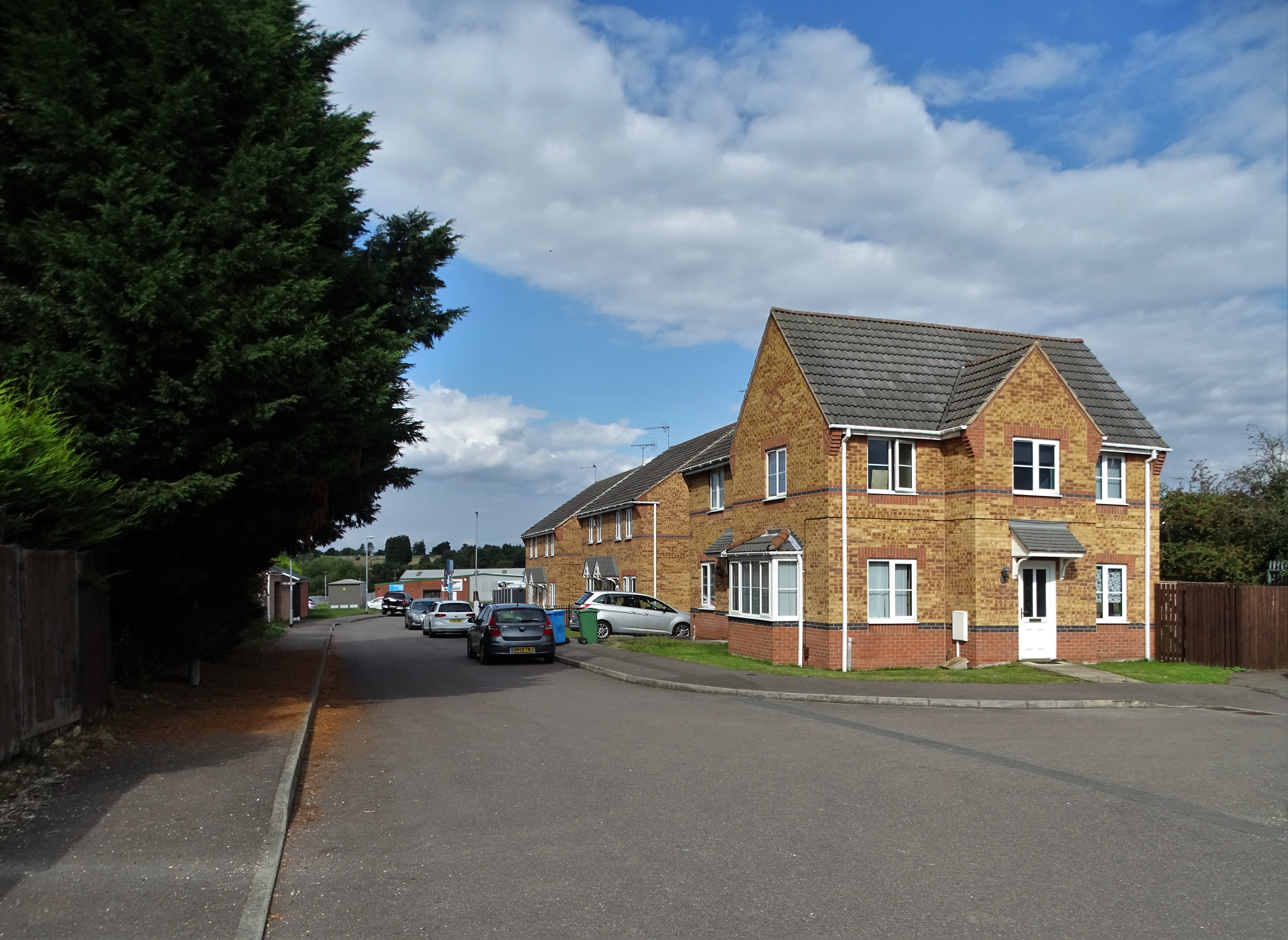
- Forest Rise

- Location within Nottinghamshire
- OS grid reference: SK595785
- District: Bassetlaw
- Shire county: Nottinghamshire
- Region: East Midlands
- Country: England
- Sovereign state: United Kingdom
- Post town: WORKSOP
- Postcode district: S80
- Dialling code: 01909
- Police: Nottinghamshire
- Fire: Nottinghamshire
- Ambulance: East Midlands
- UK Parliament: Bassetlaw

Manton is a suburb of south-east Worksop in north Nottinghamshire, England.

== History ==
Manton's main source of employment for 100 years was Manton Colliery sunk by the Wigan Coal and Iron Company in the late 19th century. The model village was constructed soon afterwards to accommodate the families of miners who came from many parts of the country to secure employment. The village had a school and clubhouse. Manton was separate from Worksop but became contiguous to the town when the council estates were built in the 1950s and 1960s.

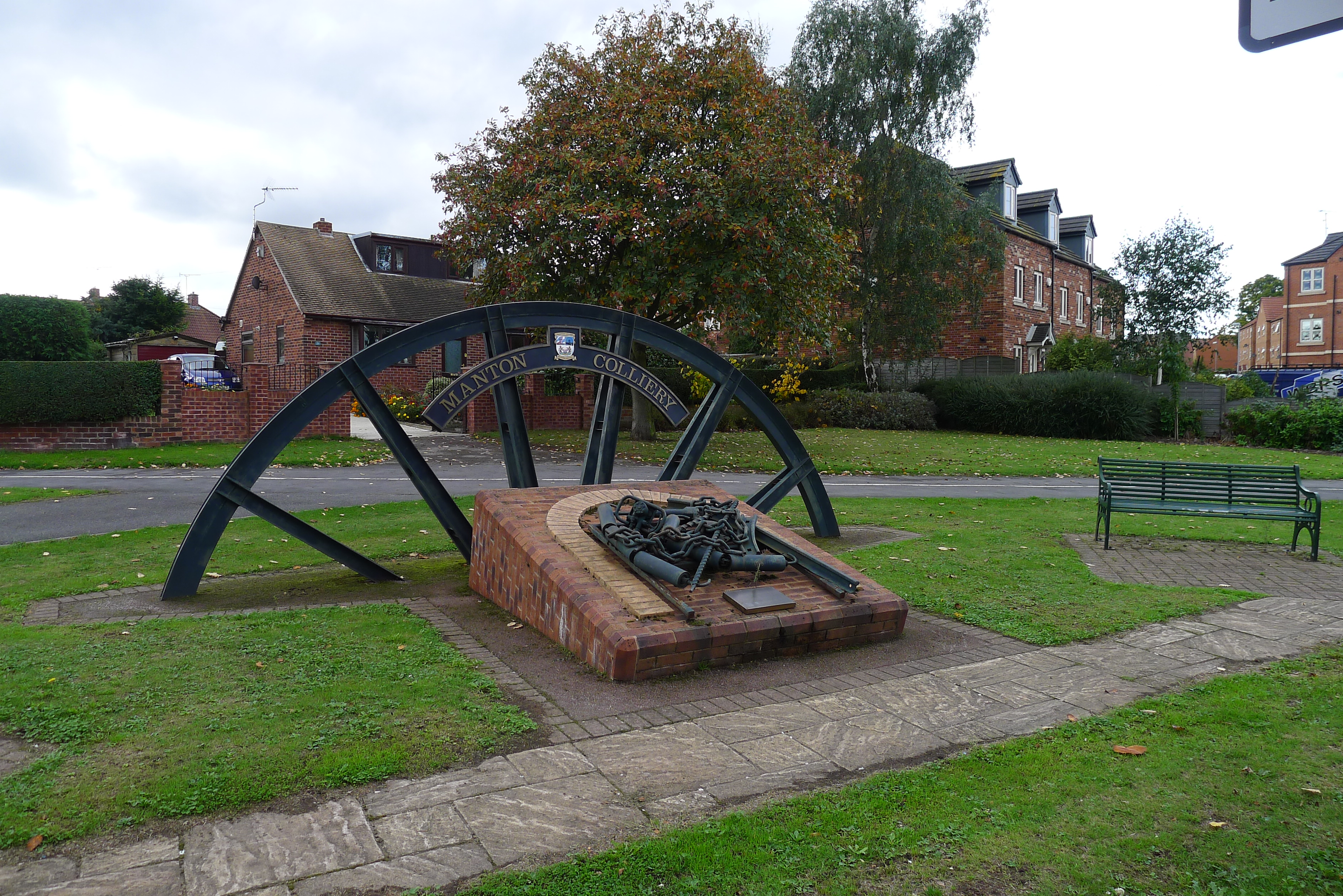
Manton Colliery Memorial

The colliery was on the South Yorkshire coalfield and was part of the striking Yorkshire region of the National Union of Mineworkers, whereas most miners in the Nottinghamshire region worked through the strike. Two miners from Manton Colliery made headlines in 1984 by challenging the strike's legitimacy under the NUM's constitution, and winning a verdict that the strike was illegal. The miners at Manton had overwhelmingly voted against the strike, but police had advised that they could not guarantee the safety of working miners against pickets.

David Peace's novel GB84 refers to Manton, but mistakenly locates it in South Yorkshire.
