= Kilvington =

Hamlet and civil parish in Nottinghamshire, England

Coordinates: 52.981°N 0.808°W

- Hamlet and civil parish
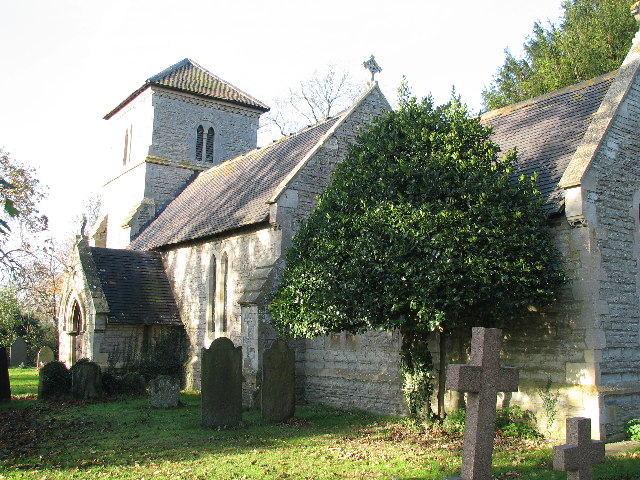
- Saint Mary's Church, Kilvington

- Location within Nottinghamshire
- Interactive map of Kilvington
- Area: 0.76 sq mi (2.0 km^{2})
- Population: 37 (2021)
  - Density: 49/sq mi (19/km^{2})
- OS grid reference: SK 799428
  - London: 105 mi (169 km) SSE
- District: Newark and Sherwood
- Shire county: Nottinghamshire
- Region: East Midlands
- Country: England
- Sovereign state: United Kingdom
- Post town: Nottingham
- Postcode district: NG13
- Dialling code: 01949
- Police: Nottinghamshire
- Fire: Nottinghamshire
- Ambulance: East Midlands
- UK Parliament: Newark

Kilvington is a hamlet and civil parish in Nottinghamshire, England, part of the Newark and Sherwood district.

Dr Robert Thoroton in Antiquities of Nottinghamshire mentions enclosure 'about the Year 1750', but an act of parliament to enclose about 400 acres was passed in 1804 and the Award, mentioning 410 acres of the township of Alverton in Staunton, together with Kilvington, is dated 1810.

It is combined with its neighbouring parish of Alverton to form an area for a parish meeting. Population count was 37 residents at the 2021 census.

== See also ==
- Listed buildings in Kilvington
