= Coddington, Nottinghamshire =

Village and civil parish in England

Coordinates: 53.08°N 0.75°W

Coddington
- Village and civil parish
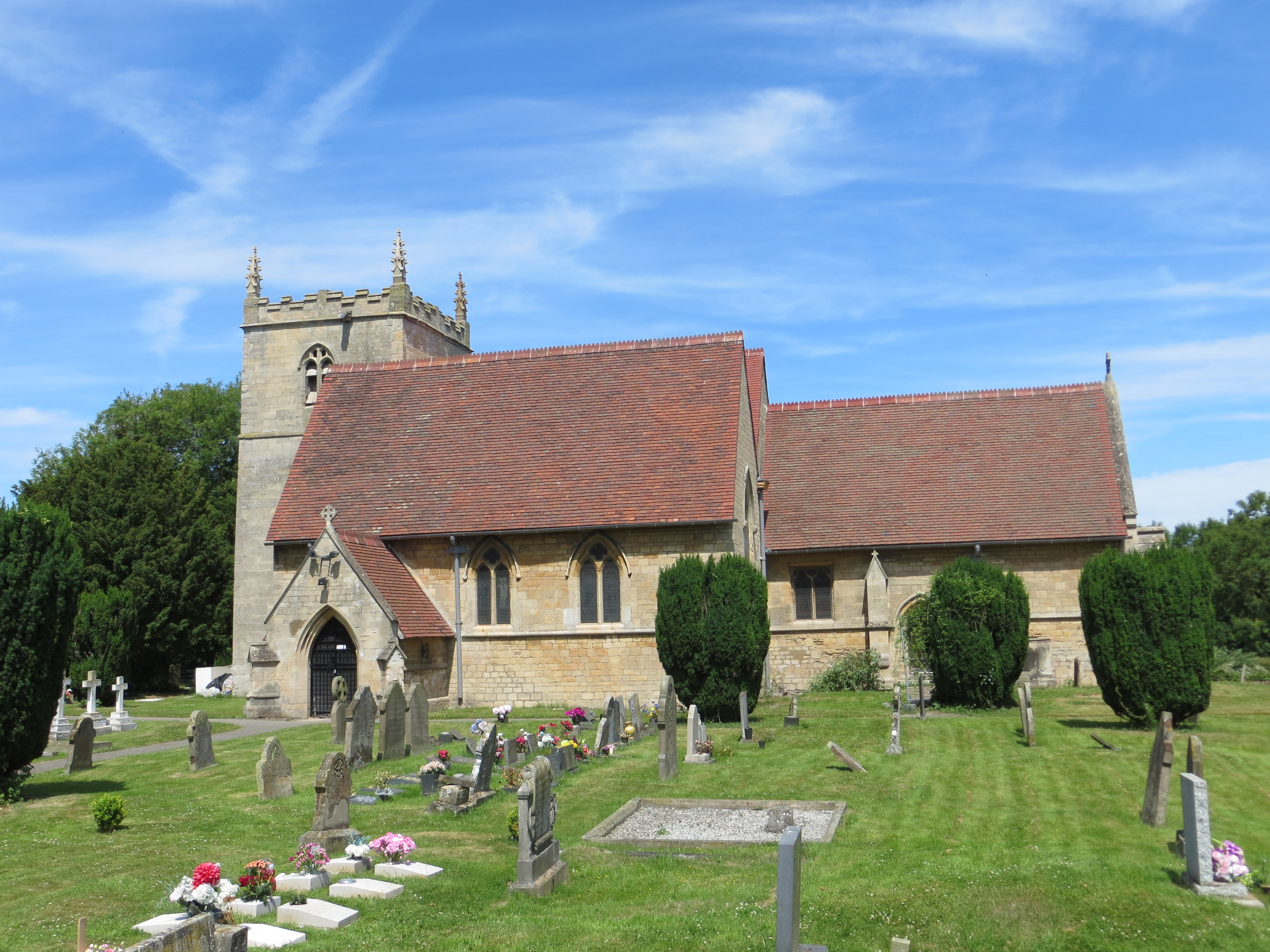
- All Saints Church

- Location within Nottinghamshire
- Interactive map of Coddington
- Area: 3.21 sq mi (8.3 km^{2})
- Population: 1,538 (2021)
  - Density: 479/sq mi (185/km^{2})
- OS grid reference: SK 835545
  - London: 110 mi (180 km) SSE
- District: Newark and Sherwood
- Shire county: Nottinghamshire
- Region: East Midlands
- Country: England
- Sovereign state: United Kingdom
- Post town: NEWARK
- Postcode district: NG24
- Dialling code: 01636
- Police: Nottinghamshire
- Fire: Nottinghamshire
- Ambulance: East Midlands
- UK Parliament: Newark
- Website: Coddington Parish Council

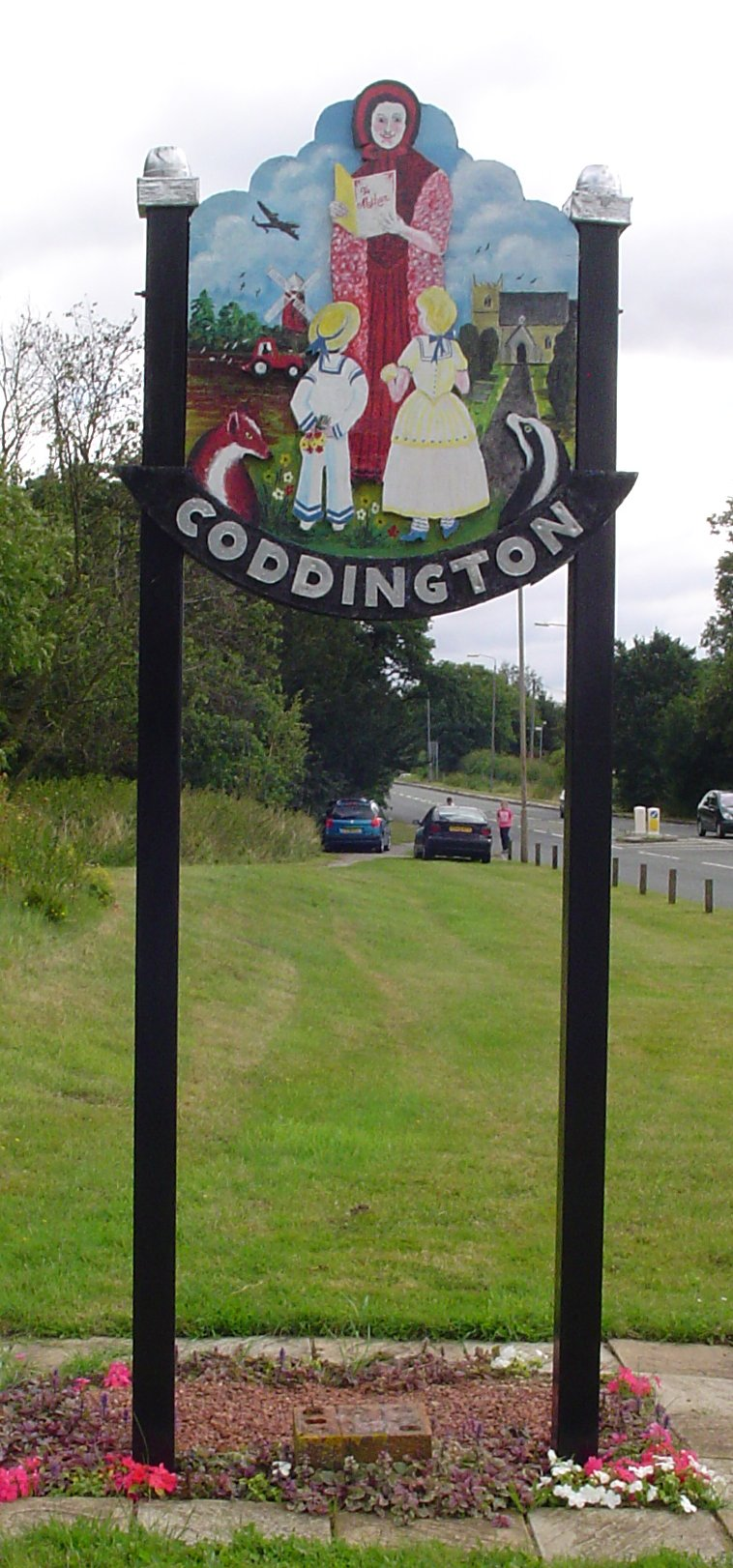
Village sign in Coddington

Coddington is a village and civil parish in the Newark and Sherwood district of Nottinghamshire, England. It is 3 miles (4.8 km) east of Newark-on-Trent. According to the 2001 census it had a population of 972, which increased to 1,684 at the 2011 Census and to 1,538 at the 2021 census.

== History ==
=== Early history ===
The Domesday Book of 1086 calls the area now known as Coddington "Cotta's/Codda's Farm". Little is known for sure after this until about 1320, when "Coddington Stone" was used to build Newark Castle.

A predecessor windmill of one of those mentioned earlier was first recorded in 1597. Around that period, land records begin to appear in relation to the village, which was sometimes known as "Codyngton".

=== 19th century ===
The chapel was built in 1827 and the Church of England National School in 1846. The school gained a local competitor in 1858.

==== Mills ====
Coddington Mill was a four-storey brick tower windmill built in 1859 to replace a post mill on the same site (grid reference SK832536). The tower was originally three storeys, raised to four when patent sails were fitted. It had two single and two double patent sails mounted on a cross, rotating anti-clockwise, with an eight-bladed fantail. It ceased working by wind about 1944, after being damaged by a blast from a landmine, and was derelict from 1947 until converted into a house some time after 1983.

A post mill on a different site was recorded in 1818 as being owned by William Else; it had a two-storey roundhouse building. Another mill was advertised in 1818 as a good new erected brick Smock Mill owned by John Else.

=== 20th–21st centuries ===
The A17, built in 1935, runs through the village. The A1 bypass dates from 1963.

When RAF Winthorpe opened in the late 1940s its married quarters were built at Coddington. With the demise of the air base, these houses were sold to the council in 1976. The area of housing, known as the Coddington Camp, was demolished in 1999–2000. The Hutchinson Road estate was constructed nearby in 1999.

The Boundary Commission in 2014 moved the Collingham and Coddington areas into Balderton North and Coddington wards for the Newark and Sherwood District Council election in 2015–2019.

== Amenities ==
A new school building was begun in 1956 and formally opened on 28 May 1964. Coddington CofE Primary and Nursery School, with 431 pupils, received an overall ranking of "good" in a short inspection on 15 January 2019, as it had in a full inspection on 25 February 2015. There is an After School Club next to the school. In 1938 a Scout troop was formed.

The Anglican parish of All Saints Church, Coddington, is now part of the United Benefice of St Giles, Balderton, All Saints, Barnby in the Willows, and All Saints, Coddington.

== See also ==
- Listed buildings in Coddington, Nottinghamshire
