= Alverton =

Hamlet and civil parish in Nottinghamshire, England

Coordinates: 52.97°N 0.82°W

- Hamlet and civil parish
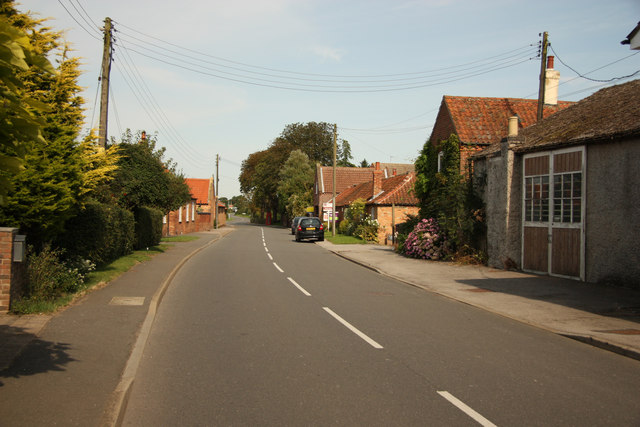
- Alverton centre

- Location within Nottinghamshire
- Interactive map of Alverton
- Area: 0.69 sq mi (1.8 km^{2})
- Population: 61 (2021)
  - Density: 88/sq mi (34/km^{2})
- OS grid reference: SK 7942
  - London: 105 mi (169 km) SSE
- District: Newark and Sherwood
- Shire county: Nottinghamshire
- Region: East Midlands
- Country: England
- Sovereign state: United Kingdom
- Post town: NOTTINGHAM
- Postcode district: NG13
- Dialling code: 01949
- Police: Nottinghamshire
- Fire: Nottinghamshire
- Ambulance: East Midlands
- UK Parliament: Newark

Alverton can also be a variant of Alverston or Alton.

Alverton is an English hamlet and civil parish in the Newark and Sherwood district of Nottinghamshire. It is joined by neighbouring Kilvington to form an area for a parish meeting. It contains 22 houses surrounded by farmland, and reported 61 residents in the 2021 census. The River Devon and its tributary, the Winter Beck, run along its eastern border.

== Amenities ==
There is a Montessori nursery school at Staunton-in-the-Vale (1.6 miles, 2.6 km), primary schools at Orston (2.1 miles, 3.4 km) and Bottesford (3.6 miles, 5.8 km), and secondary schools at Bingham (7.3 miles, 11.7 km), Bottesford and Newark-on-Trent (7.5 miles, 12.1 km).

Alverton has no shops or places of worship. The nearest Anglican church is St Mary's at Staunton and the nearest Methodist church at Long Bennington (3.8 miles, 6.1 km). The nearest shopping centres are Bingham and Newark. The closest pubs are the Staunton Arms at Staunton and the Durham Ox at Orston.

Two buses run through Alverton on Wednesdays and Fridays between Newark and in the one case Shelton and the other Bottesford. The nearest train service is at Bottesford railway station on the line between Nottingham, Grantham and Skegness line.

== History ==
Alverton historically formed part of Kilvington parish in Newark wapentake. It appears in the 1086 Domesday Book as Alvretun and Alvritun. The township was recorded in 1832 as having only 16 inhabitants. It had been enclosed in 1806. The Lord of the Manor was recorded as Rev. Dr. Staunton, and its "two farmers" as Robert Cross and Charles Neale. In 1870–72 it had seven houses and a population of 40.

== Ghosts ==
The former Staunton Church of England School in the village is now a private house, said to be haunted by a teacher once murdered there. There have been two purported sightings of a ghost at another house, The Chestnuts, each describing the figure of an elderly lady in Victorian garb, thought to be a former sempstress to Queen Victoria, Mary Brown, who had returned to Alverton as housekeeper to her widowed brother and ruled his four children "with a rod of iron".

== External sources ==
- Photographs of the old school and schoolmaster's house in 1978 appear in Our Nottinghamshire.
- A 2014 photograph of the old school can be seen here.
- A 1900 map showing Alverton and neighbouring villages can be found in the National Library of Scotland.
