= Elston =

Village in Nottinghamshire, England

Coordinates: 53°01′30″N 0°52′07″W

- Village and civil parish
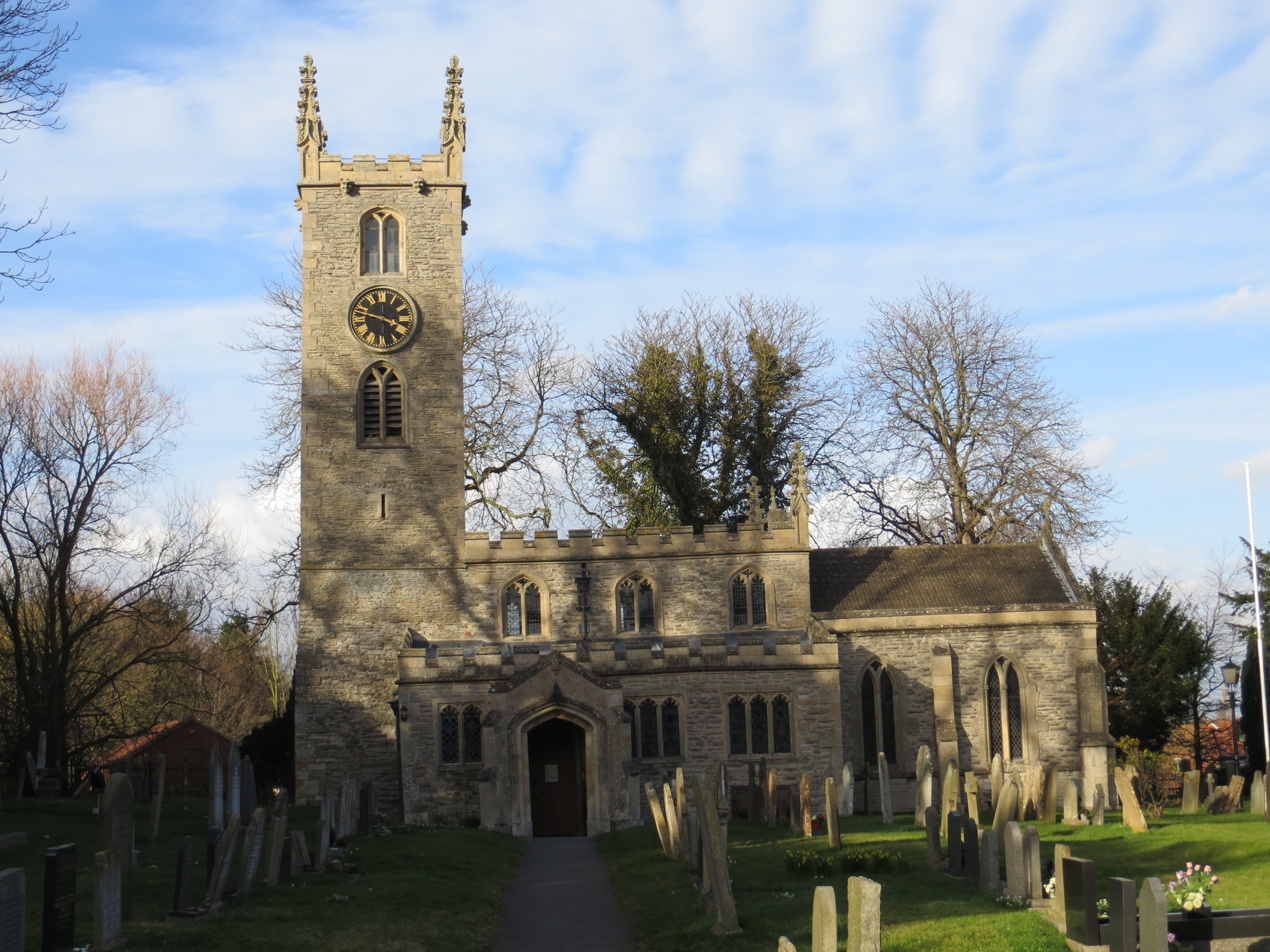
- All Saints Church, Elston

- Location within Nottinghamshire
- Interactive map of Elston
- Area: 2.51 sq mi (6.5 km^{2})
- Population: 697 (2021)
  - Density: 278/sq mi (107/km^{2})
- OS grid reference: SK 759481
  - London: 110 mi (180 km) SSE
- District: Newark and Sherwood
- Shire county: Nottinghamshire
- Region: East Midlands
- Country: England
- Sovereign state: United Kingdom
- Post town: NEWARK
- Postcode district: NG23
- Dialling code: 01636
- Police: Nottinghamshire
- Fire: Nottinghamshire
- Ambulance: East Midlands
- UK Parliament: Newark
- Website: elstonparish.org.uk

Elston is a village and civil parish in the Newark and Sherwood district, in Nottinghamshire, England, to the south-west of Newark, 0.5 mi (800 m) from the A46 Fosse Way. The population of the civil parish taken at the 2011 census was 631, increasing to 697 at the 2021 census. It lies between the rivers Trent and Devon, with the village "set amongst trees and farmland less than a mile from the A46.... Newark is five miles to the north, with... Lincoln and Nottingham some 18 miles north and south-west respectively."

== Darwins ==
According to Cornelius Brown's 1896 History of Nottinghamshire, the village lies

"very snugly and prettily ensconced in the midst of a pleasing landscape of North England. Nearly opposite each other are the Hall and vicarage, both occupying delightful situations, and built in elegant and stately style. All Saints' Church, Elston has been handsomely restored, and is singularly rich in its memorials of the Darwins. This eminent family appear to have come to Elston from Lincolnshire towards the close of the seventeenth century, the manor being brought into the possession of William Darwin through his marriage with the heiress of Robert Waring of Wilford. William had two sons, and Elston was left to Robert, the younger, in whom the taste for scientific research began to develop."

Elston "currently has about 650 residents in 280 households. A number of new homes have been built within the last twenty years on once open spaces and there continues to be infill development on some of the large gardens."

== History ==
Elston was "founded by the Angles in the 5th century. Its square shape is typically Anglo Saxon. The name derives from a leader named Elva and appears in the Domesday Book as Elvastun. Historic old buildings in and adjacent to the parish include Elston Hall, All Saints Church, the Old Chapel of Ease on the site of a mediaeval leper hospital, the Methodist Chapel, and Elston Towers, the Victorian mansion of preacher Robert Middleton, now refurbished as a day spa and renamed Eden Hall."

== Elston Hall ==
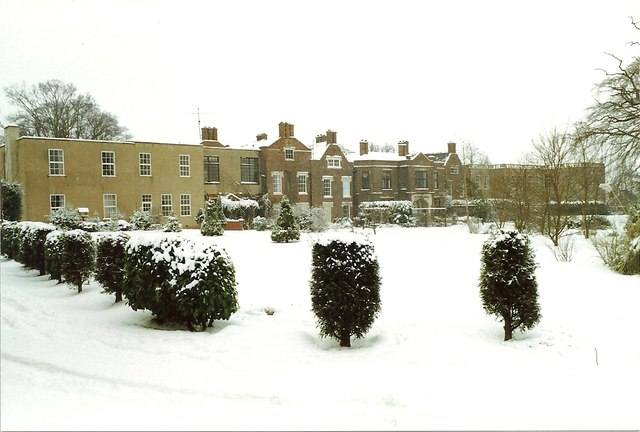
Elston Hall in 1991

Elston Hall was "the home of the Darwin family from 1680 until just after the Second World War, when the estate was sold. Its premier resident was the savant Erasmus Darwin, grandfather of Charles Darwin. Erasmus founded the Lunar Society, which included Josiah Wedgwood, Matthew Boulton, James Watt, Joseph Priestley and Benjamin Franklin."

The present house was begun in 1756, then extended in 1837 and again later that century and in the 1950s. Originally H-shaped, it is now a linear sequence of two-storey ranges, the earliest being the central range built in blue lias stone. Grade II listed in 1952, the buildings are now divided into ten residences.

== Elston Chapel ==
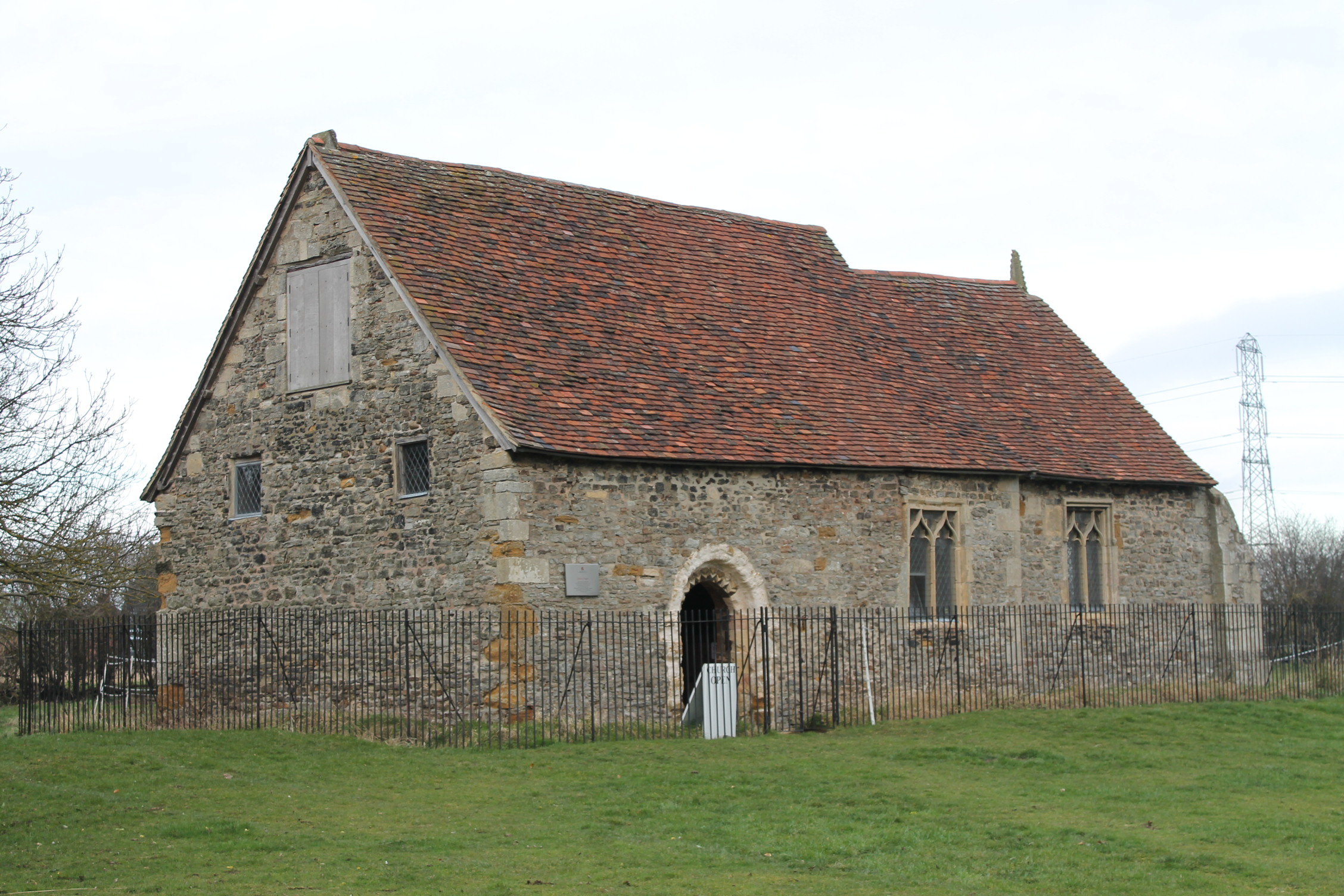
Elston Chapel

Once a parish church, this was declared redundant in 1976, and under the care of the Churches Conservation Trust. It is a Grade I listed building containing a fine Norman south doorway with zigzag decoration.

Inside are layers of wall paintings. It is thought it may have been the chapel of a medieval leper hospital dedicated to St Leonard.

== Elston Mill ==
Maps show windmills on the north side of Elston Lane (grid reference SK756487) and south side of Mill Lane (grid reference SK760477). The latter was a tower mill built about 1844, the tower being bottle-shaped, with an increase in batter at the 3rd floor. Some renovation was done by Gash in 1919 and a new sail fitted by Wakes and Lamb of Newark for £74 in 1920. However, it was demolished in about 1940.

== See also ==
- Listed buildings in Elston
