= Stanton-on-the-Wolds =

Village and civil parish in Nottinghamshire, England

Coordinates: 52.868°N 1.063°W

- Village and civil parish
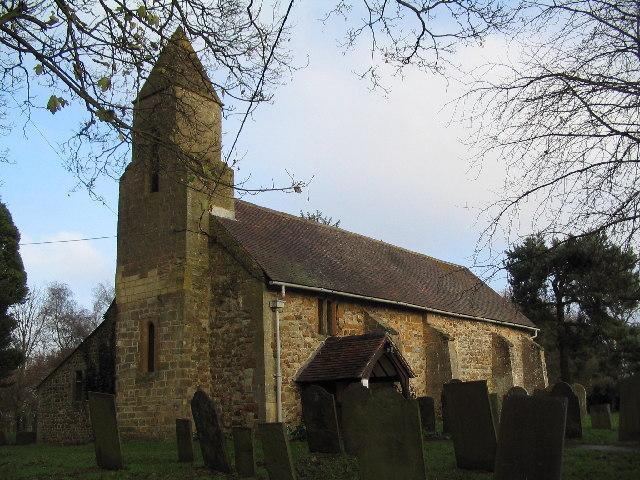
- Church of All Saints, Stanton

- Location within Nottinghamshire
- Interactive map of Stanton-on-the-Wolds
- Area: 2.37 sq mi (6.1 km^{2})
- Population: 413 (2021)
  - Density: 174/sq mi (67/km^{2})
- OS grid reference: SK 629303
  - London: 100 mi (160 km) SSE
- District: Rushcliffe
- Shire county: Nottinghamshire
- Region: East Midlands
- Country: England
- Sovereign state: United Kingdom
- Post town: NOTTINGHAM
- Postcode district: NG12
- Dialling code: 0115
- Police: Nottinghamshire
- Fire: Nottinghamshire
- Ambulance: East Midlands
- UK Parliament: Rushcliffe
- Website: www.stantononthewoldsparishcouncil.org.uk

Stanton-on-the-Wolds is a small village and a civil parish in Nottinghamshire, England. It is situated about 6 miles (10 km) south-east of Nottingham, just off the A606 Nottingham to Melton Mowbray road. It is bordered by several other villages, namely, Clipston-on-the-Wolds, Normanton-on-the-Wolds, Keyworth and Widmerpool. 413 residents within the parish were reported at the 2021 census.

== History ==
Artefacts from Stanton have been recorded as dating to all three periods of the Stone age: Paleolithic, Mesolithic, and Neolithic.

The oldest was a worked flint core found in 2006 after ditch maintenance west of the stream below Hill Farm.

Stanton has had various names: in 1086 it was known as 'Stanture' and as Estanton in 1235. It was known as Stanton Super Wold in 1240–80. According to local history, in the late 18th century, the village was hit by a freak hailstorm when large stones caused extensive damage; this accounts for the lack of older buildings.

== War memorial ==
The memorial was erected in 1920 close to the north-west corner of All Saints’ Parish Church and was funded by parish subscription. The cost amounted to £21 11s (£21.55) and it was made by William Bryans, the Overseer of Stanton for the Bingham Union.

The stone cross stands on a plinth that is inscribed with the names of the three men from the parish who fell in World War I:

- Hatherley, Joseph – North Staffordshire Prince of Wales's Regiment
- Hatherley, Leonard – Sherwood Foresters (Nottinghamshire and Derbyshire Regiment)
- Kemp, Tom Henry – Royal Scots Fusiliers

As a Millennium project, it was moved after maintenance to the memorial area outside the old churchyard.

From 12 April 2019, the memorial has been Grade II listed as being of special architectural or historic interest.

== Water tower ==
Until the 1930s, most villages south of the River Trent were supplied from Nottingham’s reservoirs and water mains. However, from beyond Plumtree railway station the ground levels become higher. To maintain a reliable water supply to the Wolds villages a water tower was erected opposite Stanton Parish Church and a pumping station near Plumtree railway station to pump water to the top of the tower.

The pump house and tower were constructed by John Cawley, a contractor from Nottingham. A spiral structure of 115 steps led to the summit through a shaft in the centre of the tanks. In order to ensure a firm foundation, a borehole was sunk to the depth of 90 feet where a foundation was located. The tower was to be hidden from view from the road by planting a shrubbery and a row of beech trees. 21 poplar trees were planted around the perimeter of the tower itself and there was to be an apple orchard and the site contained within a wrought-iron fence. The opening of Stanton Water Tower was reported in the Nottingham Guardian dated 26 June 1923.

The water tower was demolished in 1985 leaving the surrounding circle of Poplar trees. vv

== Stanton tunnel ==
Stanton tunnel is the longest of the four tunnels on the Nottingham to Melton Mowbray Railway and runs for 1,332 yd (1,218 m)

Construction of the line began in 1874, the tunnel was completed in 1878 and the line opened in 1879.

The line was closed in 1968. However, British Rail retained the line from Melton Mowbray to Edwalton. This is now known as the Old Dalby Test Track.

== Amenities ==
=== All Saints' Church ===
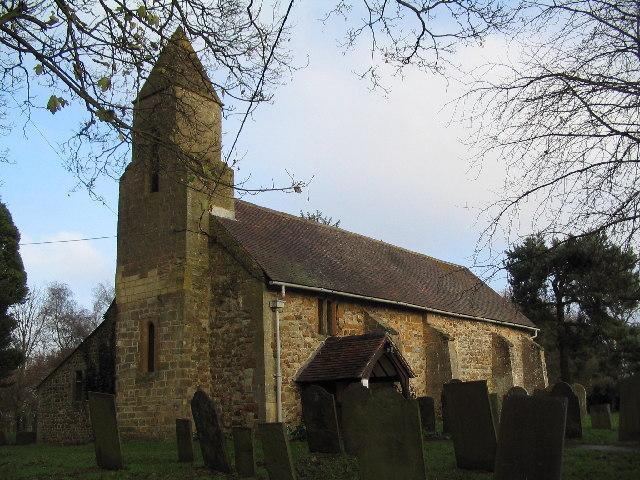
Church of All Saints, Stanton-on-the-Wolds

Originally dedicated to St John the Baptist, the church was re-dedicated during the 19th century. It is located on Browns Lane

The church is a part of the Benefice of Keyworth Stanton and Bunny, comprising the following churches:

- St Mary Magdalene, Keyworth;
- All Saints, Stanton-on-the-Wolds; and
- St Mary the Virgin, Bunny with Bradmore.

=== Stanton-on-the-Wolds Golf Club ===
The club was established in March 1906 by local residents. The course has 18 holes and was designed by the architect and golfer Tom Williamson.

=== Bus services ===
From Monday to Saturday, Stanton-on-the-Wolds is served by the number 19 Nottingham to Oakham bus. This passes along the Melton Road (A606) five times a day in each direction and runs via Tollerton, Normanton-on-the-Wolds, Nether Broughton, Melton Mowbray, Ashwell, and Langham

The Nottingham Minibus 853 service also runs on Monday to Saturday, from Hickling and Kinoulton through Stanton, Keyworth, Plumtree, and Tollerton to the Morrisons supermarket in Gamston. This service runs three times a day in each direction. The bus runs along Stanton Lane and Browns Lane and stops on request.

== See also ==
- Listed buildings in Stanton-on-the-Wolds
