= Edmund King =

Edmund King may refer to:

- Edmund King (physician) (c.1630–1709), English surgeon and physician
- Edmund King (cricketer, born 1906) (1906–1981), English cricketer who played for Warwickshire
- Edmund King (cricketer, born 1907) (1907–1990), English cricketer who played for Gloucestershire
- Edmund King (campaigner), President of the Automobile Association
