= Clipston =

Clipston may refer to the following places in the United Kingdom:

- Clipston, Northamptonshire
- Clipston, Nottinghamshire

== See also ==
- Clipstone
