= Normanton-on-the-Wolds =

Village and civil parish in Nottinghamshire, England

- Village and civil parish
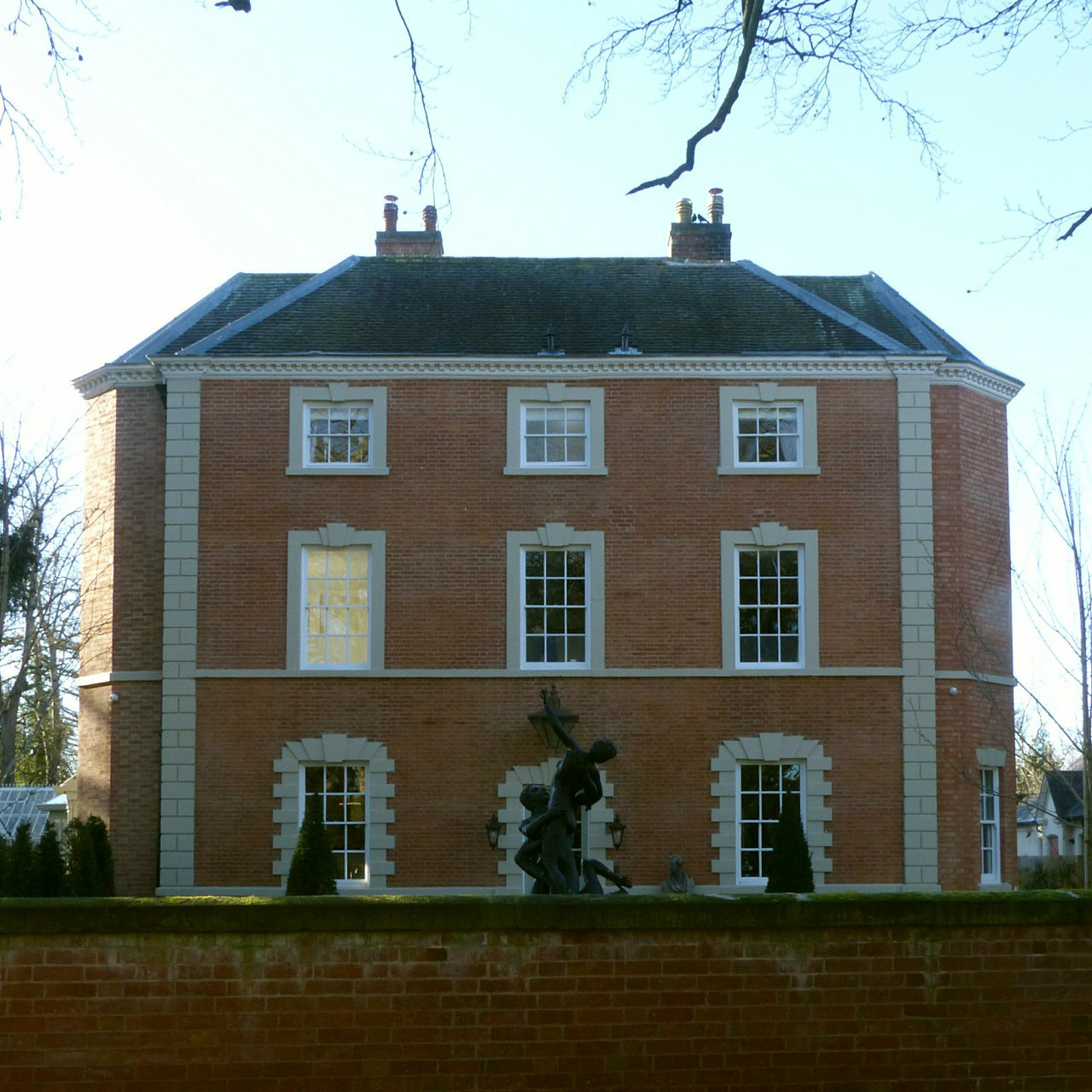
- Normanton House

- Location within Nottinghamshire
- Interactive map of Normanton-on-the-Wolds
- Area: 1.5 sq mi (3.9 km^{2})
- Population: 251 (2021)
  - Density: 167/sq mi (64/km^{2})
- OS grid reference: SK 622329
  - London: 105 mi (169 km) SSE
- Civil parish: Normanton-on-the-Wolds
- District: Rushcliffe
- Shire county: Nottinghamshire
- Region: East Midlands
- Country: England
- Sovereign state: United Kingdom
- Post town: NOTTINGHAM
- Postcode district: NG12
- Dialling code: 0115
- Police: Nottinghamshire
- Fire: Nottinghamshire
- Ambulance: East Midlands
- UK Parliament: Rushcliffe
- Website: www.normanton-on-the-wolds.org.uk

Normanton-on-the-Wolds is a small village and civil parish in the Rushcliffe district, in the county of Nottinghamshire, England. Population for the 2011 census was 245, increasing slightly to 251 residents at the 2021 census. The total area of the parish is 1.5 square miles (3.9 km^{2}; 390 ha; 960 acres).

== Overview ==
The name "Normanton" (Norwegian's village – Place Names of Nottinghamshire, Gover, Mawer and Stenton (intro pxx)) is attributed to several settlements in Midlands of England. The "on the Wolds" distinguishes it and places it firmly in the Nottinghamshire Wolds Character Area.

Normanton on the Wolds is a small village six miles (10 km) south east of Nottingham very close to the village of Plumtree with which it has been associated, ecclesiastically and civilly, throughout its history. Its main street was once the main road route from Nottingham to Melton Mowbray but was bypassed in 1930 with the turnpike of the A606 which now passes just to the south of the village. The housing off Clipston Road and The Leys to the north of the village is only accessible, by vehicle, by driving onto, and shortly thereafter off the busy A606. This seclusion within a very short distance of a major road, along with the presence of many houses set in their own grounds, protected by red brick walls and mature trees and hedgerows, along the length of the village makes the south end of the village a particularly attractive place. Although the village is essentially constructed along the old Melton Road it has a Back Lane. The village consists of more exclusive homes including substantial manor houses, converted cottages and farm houses with many a large garden and long driveway. Normanton on the Wolds was designated one of ten local conservation areas by Rushcliffe Borough Council in 1990 and extended in 2009. This small village contains many historic buildings, no less than four are listed. Normanton on the Wolds presently has 7 Parish Councillors.

== Facilities ==
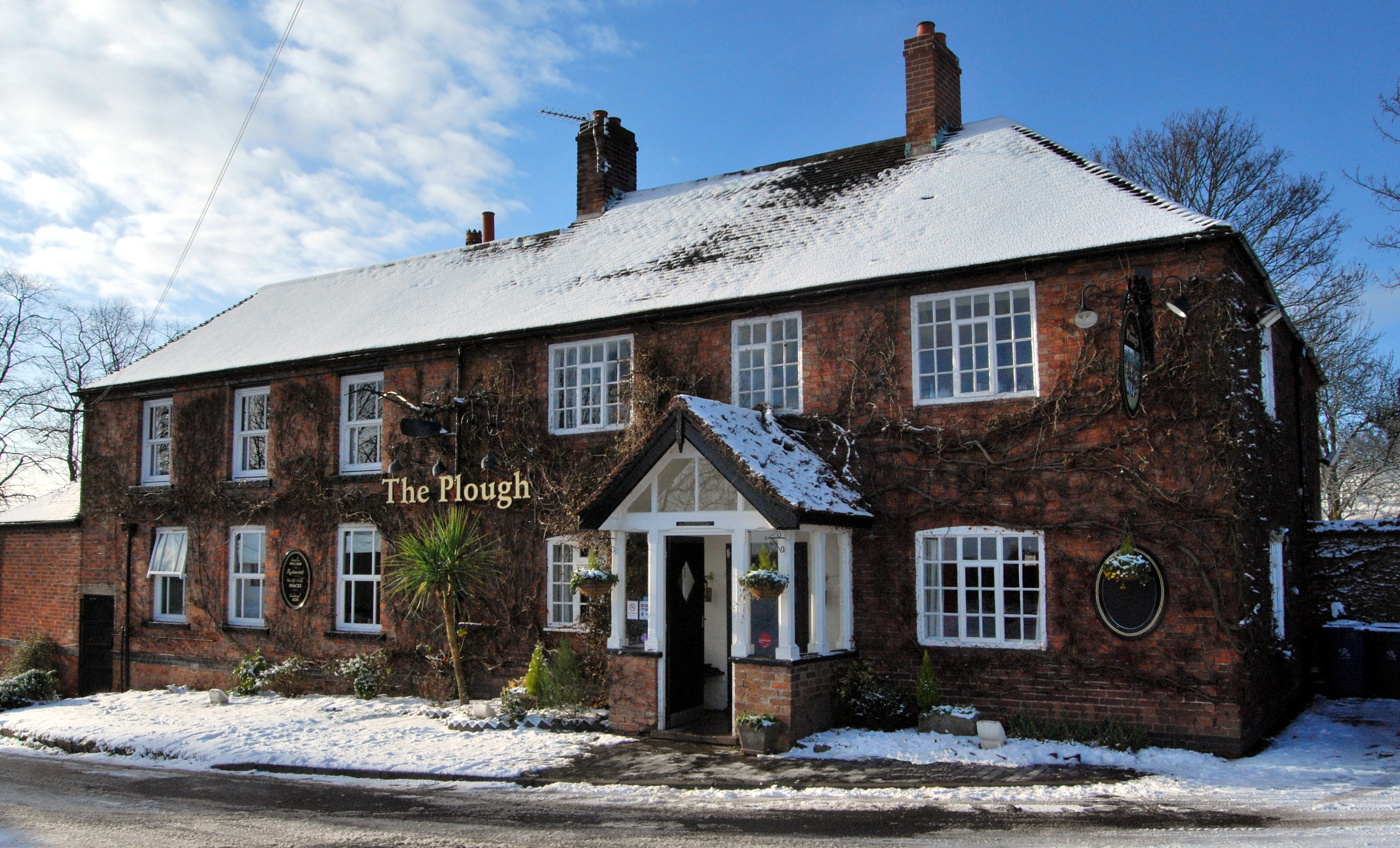
The Plough, Normanton on the Wolds

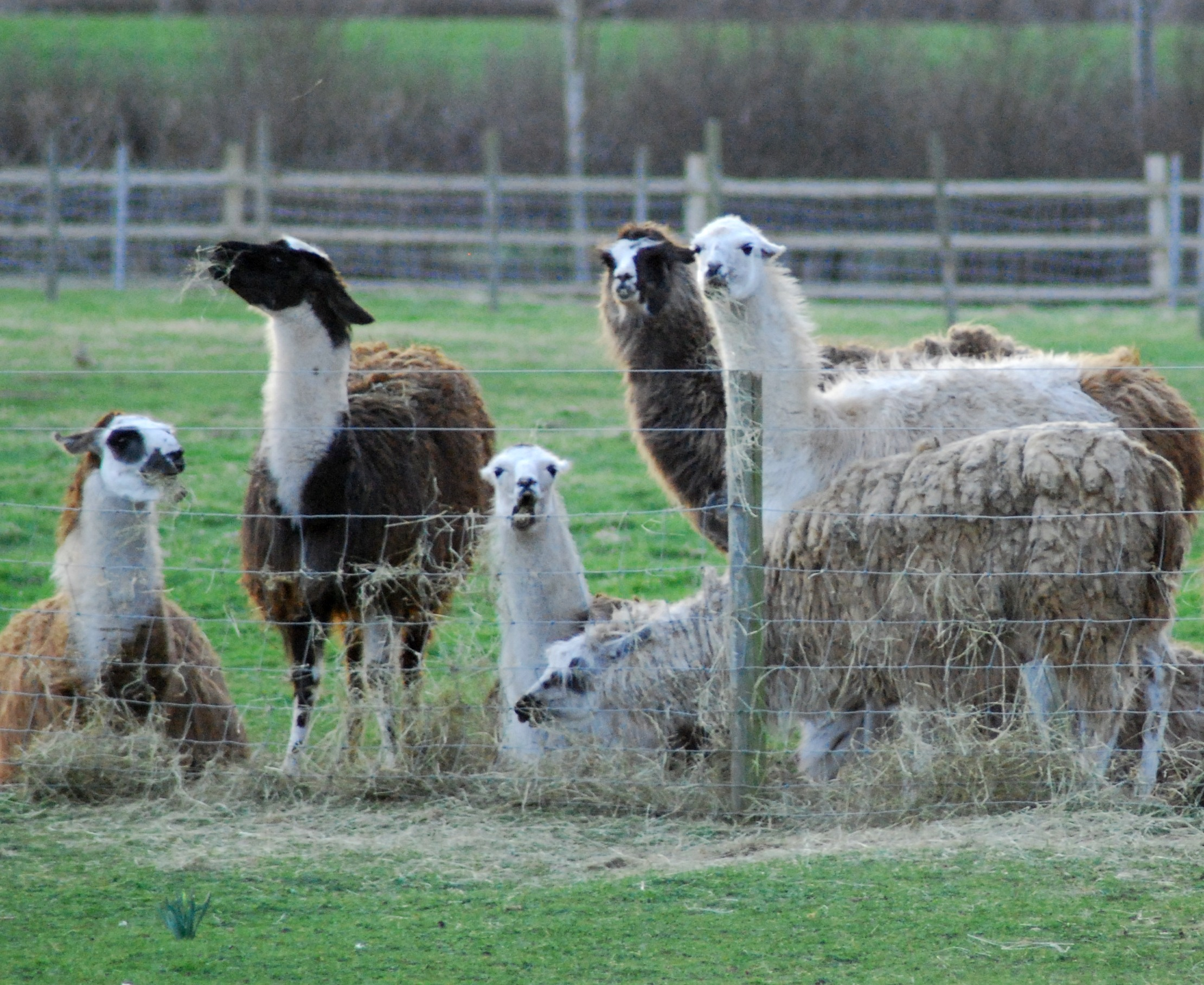
The Plough, Normanton on the Wolds Llamas

There is no school or church in this small village but the Parish church of Plumtree, dedicated to St Mary the Virgin, is very close in the nearby village of Plumtree. This ancient church, the parish church also serving Normanton and Clipston, is believed to be one of the oldest churches in Nottinghamshire. Plumtree Methodists built a chapel in the village in 1797 (which was enlarged in 1827) but is now a private dwelling. There are no shops, nor any other modern facility in Normanton, the inhabitants relying on mobility to reach nearby Tollerton, Keyworth, Cotgrave or other sources for their supplies. There are, however, businesses such as the working Avenue Farm providing stabling. Also the Ives family's Rushcliffe Breeders farm to the north of the village keeps a small, but conspicuous, Llama herd.

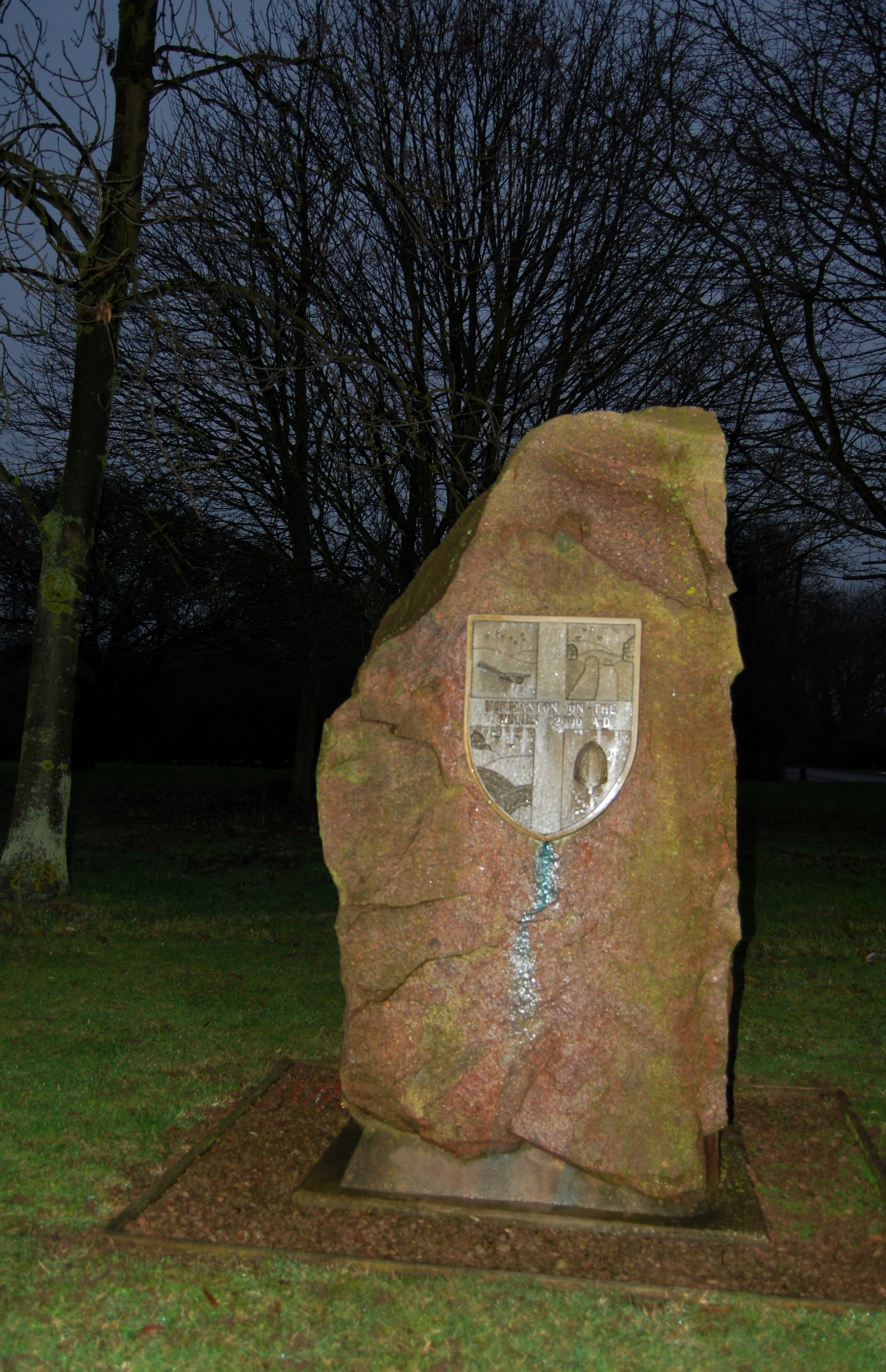
Normanton Stone Placemark

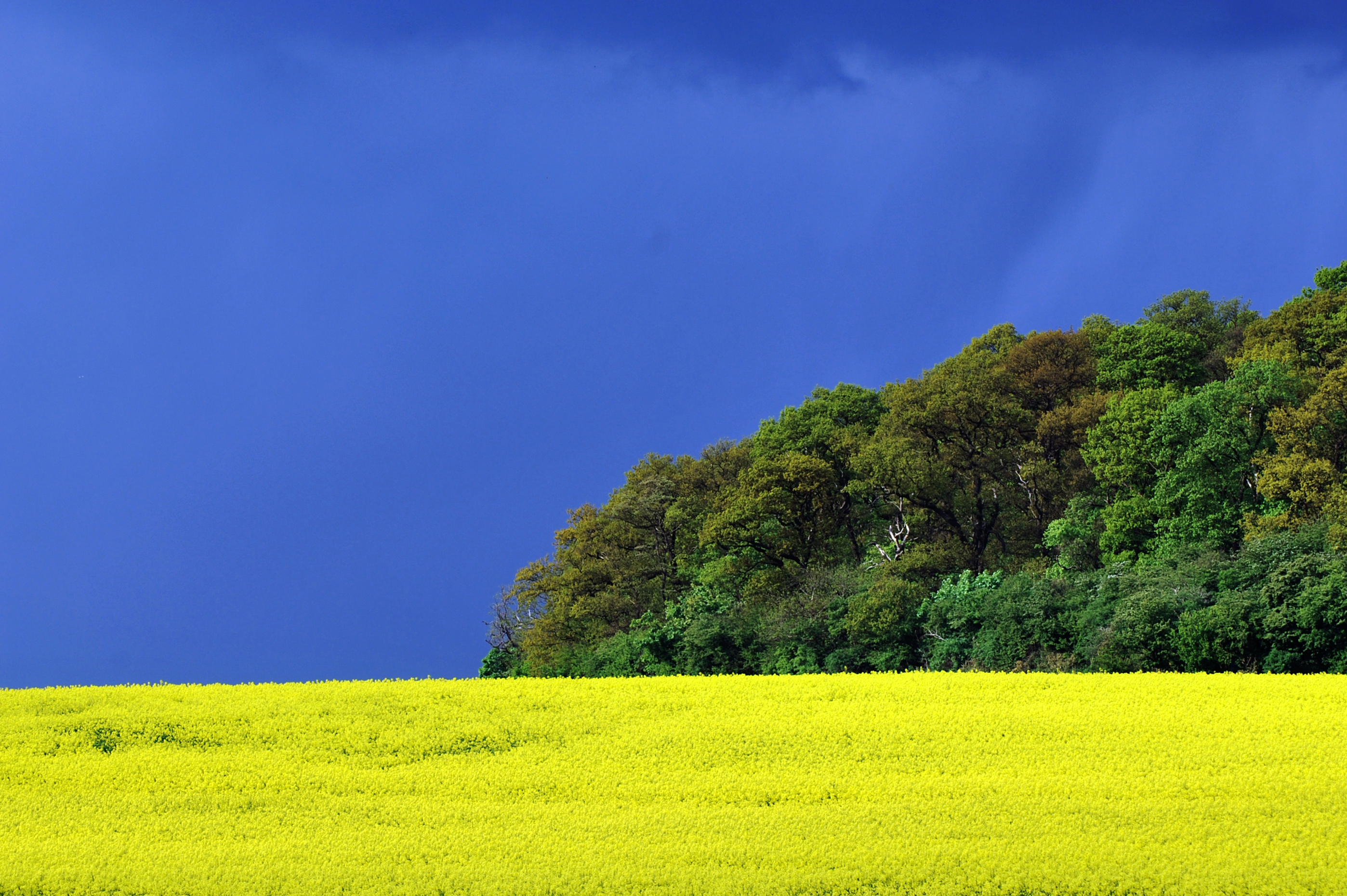
Spring on Hoe Hill from Normanton

One of the better known buildings in the village is the Plough Inn; a substantial ivy clad country road inn with extensive gardens. Regular bus services between Nottingham and Melton Mowbray detour off the A606 to pass along Old Melton Road through the village To the east of the village a pretty stream, straggled by timber footbridges, flows from the south and east off the Wolds toward the Trent. The land here is mainly agricultural and Green Belt designated. To the north and east towards nearby Tollerton, Clipston and Cotgrave is farmland which includes crop land as well as grazing for sheep and horses. The large woods less than a mile directly east are a plantation. There are extensive and well marked public footpaths in the area affording, especially on the well used path over the Wold edge to Clipston and Cotgrave, impressive views over a large area of the city of Nottingham to the North West. North of the village is the distinctive, partially wooded, Hoe Hill, which is visible for miles around and forms one of the most westerly outcrops of the Wold's northernmost Trent Valley edge.

== History ==
- c1066 Before the Norman Conquest of England, the manor associated with the village that would become Normanton was held by Unfac. Saxon burials have been found off the nearby A46 originally the Fosse Way Roman Road.
- 1086 Following the Norman conquest, the Norman baron Roger de Busli (c.1038 – c.1099) was granted what became Normanton on the Wolds and also the nearby Normanton on Soar and Normanton on Trent. De Busli is recorded in the Domesday Book as holding these lands, but he died without an heir, his son having died in infancy.
- 1099 De Busli's lands were given to Robert de Belleme, who lost them in 1102 after leading a rebellion against Henry I.
- 1154 – Seventeen acres of arable land given by Simon of Keyworth to Haveholme Priory of Lincolnshire. Thereafter this land passed into the hands of the Crusading Hospitaliers (Knoights of Malta).
- 1201 – "a royal charter decreed that land was confirmed by King John to Geoffrey Luteral (Loteral) 'the gift to him by Gerbode de Escaud of fifteen burates of land in Gamston and Normanton-on-the-Wolds'."
- 1530 Dissolution of the monasteries by Henry VII led to the lands becoming crown property.
- 1548 Lands bought by Thomas Brende. The area farmed by tenants.
- 1553 Lands bought by John, Earl of Bedford and Edmund Downing. The ownership of the land then changes often over the next two centuries.
- 1790 Enclosure of the village. "to the great loss of the church of Plumtree, to which it is parish." (Thoroton, 1790). At this time there are 20 recorded dwellings in the village and around 1,000 acres (4.0 km^{2}) of land.

By the 1830s the village had grown to 33 dwellings.

- 1848 recorded as a township, in the parish of Plumtree, union of Bingham, N. division of the wapentake of Rushcliffe, S. division of the county of Nottingham, 6 miles (S. E. by S.) from Nottingham; containing 230 inhabitants. The tithes have been commuted for £225. 15. 6." (A Topographical Dictionary of England – Editor Samuel Lewis, 1848.)

The population of the village varies greatly according to censuses records:

The population by year

| Year | Pop. | ±% p.a. |
|---|---|---|
| 1801 | 102 | — |
| 1811 | 142 | +3.36% |
| 1821 | 194 | +3.17% |
| 1831 | 185 | −0.47% |
| 1841 | 210 | +1.28% |
| 1851 | 230 | +0.91% |

| Year | Pop. | ±% p.a. |
|---|---|---|
| 1861 | 193 | −1.74% |
| 1871 | 151 | −2.42% |
| 1881 | 99 | −4.13% |
| 1891 | 1,201 | +28.35% |
| 1901 | 209 | −16.04% |

The 1891 census cites a population at that time of 206. The occupations of the heads of families vary from "own means" to "servant" and "domestic". There are many farm related occupations such as "agi labourer" maybe serving Wolds Littlewood Farm. Many road and place names such as Normanton Lane, Chapel Yard and Hawker's Yard have disappeared. There are three railway related professions included: signalman, railway porter and station master. The latter, the family Harvey, numbered eight and lived in the Railway Station. The station, closed to passengers as early as 1949 served the Nottingham Melton line (closed in 1968). The station house is slightly nearer to the centre of Plumtree than it is to Normanton.

In 1910, nine trains each way stopped at Plumtree Station. Earliest train to Nottingham was 7.02, to Melton Mowbray 6.55. A passenger catching this latter could expect to be in London St Pancras by 10.55 am. Sunday services were virtually non –existent, with only the morning milk train (7.49) to Nottingham (and no way getting back that day!). [Keyworth and Plumtree on old picture postcards Brian Lund]

The 1901 census shows little change, still a very agriculturally orientated but includes a "cottager milksitter" in the listed occupations as well as a dentist. The village had always been centred on the farming in the area of both crops and livestock. Surrounding land shows much evidence of ridge and furrow farming prevalent throughout the Middle Ages and the recurring use of the term "platt" (plot) in the area in early records points to tenanted division of the land. There are also signs of a water mill complex by the stream.

== See also ==
- Listed buildings in Normanton-on-the-Wolds
