= Listed buildings in Tollerton, Nottinghamshire =

Tollerton is a civil parish in the Rushcliffe district of Nottinghamshire, England. The parish contains 23 listed buildings that are recorded in the National Heritage List for England. All the listed buildings are designated at Grade II, the lowest of the three grades, which is applied to "buildings of national importance and special interest". The parish contains the village of Tollerton and the surrounding area, which includes Nottingham Airport, formerly Tollerton Airfield. Of the listed buildings, 17 are pillboxes in the airfield, and the others consist of a church, a country house (later a school), a smaller house, an estate lodge and gateway, a former rectory, and a war memorial.

== Buildings ==
Name and location	Photograph	Date	Notes
St Peter's Church and wall 52.90694°N 1.08615°W		13th century	The church has been altered and extended through the centuries, including remodelling in about 1812 when a mausoleum was incorporated. The tower is in stone, the south extension is in brick, and the rest of the church is stuccoed. The church consists of a nave with a clerestory, north and south aisles, a south mausoleum, a chancel, a south vestry, and a northwest tower. The tower has a single stage, a diagonal buttress, a west doorway, Gothic windows, triangular-headed two-light bell openings, and a stepped embattled parapet. At the east end is a crow-stepped parapet with obelisk finials, and the nave has a hipped roof, under which is a zigzag brick frieze. Attached to the mausoleum is an embattled five-bay arcaded wall divided by buttresses with obelisk finials.
Roclaveston Manor; 52.90654°N 1.08553°W		c. 1675	An country house, originally Tollerton Hall, much altered in the 18th and 19th centuries, and later a school, it is mainly rendered with some stone, on a plinth, and has parapets. The entrance front has nine bays, the middle three projecting with three storeys, the outer bays with two storeys and embattled parapets, and at the ends are turrets with arrow slits and projecting tops on corbels. The windows are casements. In the centre is a three-bay single storey embattled porte cochère with outer embattled turrets, and on its outer walls are windows with pointed arches and Gothic glazing. To the right of the main block is a recessed embattled wing at an angle, and a clock tower. On the garden front is a three-storey canted bay window.
The Old Rectory; 52.90690°N 1.08673°W	—	Late 17th century	The rectory, later a private house, is rendered with some stone, on a plinth, with bracketed eaves, and a tile roof with stone coped gables and kneelers. There are two storeys and five bays. The doorway has a fanlight and a hood, and the windows are a mix of sashes and casements.
198 Tollerton Lane; 52.90904°N 1.08512°W		Late 18th century	The house is in brick, with red stretcher and pink headers, and it has a tile roof with brick coped gables and kneelers. There are three storeys and four bays, and a two-story single-bay lean-to recessed on the left. The doorway has a hood, and the windows are casements, those in the lower two floors under segmental arches.
The Lodge, gateway and wall 52.91015°N 1.08413°W		c. 1825	The lodge and gateway are in rendered red brick, with a raised eaves band and a pyramidal slate roof. There are two storeys, and an irregular octagonal plan, with corner buttresses rising to pepper pot finials, and to the right are red brick extensions. The windows are casements. To the left is the gateway with a round arch, over which is a crest, and a shaped parapet with an orb finial. To its left is an octagonal pier with a pepper pot finial, attached to which is a stepped and coped stone wall extending for about 13 metres (43 ft).
War memorial 52.90749°N 1.08693°W		c. 1920	The war memorial stands in a paved enclosure, and is in Portland stone. It has a three-stepped square base, on which is a plinth, a shaft, and a lantern cross. On the plinth are inscriptions and the names of those lost in the two World Wars.
Pillbox: Square Type at SK 61398 36396; 52.92154°N 1.08821°W	—	1941	The pillbox is in brick, with concrete lintels and a flat concrete roof. It has a single storey and a square plan with chamfered corners. On the southeast side is an entrance at each end, and the embrasures face west.
Pillbox: Square Type at SK 62414 36221; 52.91985°N 1.07316°W	—	1941	The pillbox is in brick, with concrete lintels and a flat concrete roof. It has a single storey and a square plan with chamfered corners. It is surrounded by a bank of earth and the top is camouflaged by turf. On the south side is an entrance, and the embrasures face towards the airfield.
Pillbox: Square Type at SK 61959 36756; 52.92473°N 1.07974°W		1941	The pillbox is in brick, with concrete lintels and a flat concrete roof. It has a single storey and a square plan with chamfered corners, and is surrounded by a bank of earth. On the northeast side is an entrance at each end, and the embrasures face to the south, with one facing north.
Pillbox: Square Type at SK 62167 36757; 52.92468°N 1.07672°W		1941	The pillbox is in brick, with concrete lintels and a flat concrete roof. It has a single storey and a square plan with chamfered corners. On the northwest side is an entrance, and the embrasures face south. The brickwork is showing signs of weathering and erosion.
Pillbox: Square Type at SK 62259 36823; 52.92528°N 1.07533°W		1941	The pillbox is in brick, with concrete lintels and a flat concrete roof. It has a single storey and a square plan with chamfered corners. On the north side is an entrance, and the embrasures face towards the airfield.
Pillbox: Square Type at SK 62300 35984; 52.91730°N 1.07418°W		1941	The pillbox is in brick, with concrete lintels and a flat concrete roof. It has a single storey and a square plan with chamfered corners, and is surrounded by a bank of earth. On the south side is an entrance, and the embrasures face towards the airfield.
Pillbox: Square Type at SK 61832 36667; 52.92391°N 1.08167°W		1941	The pillbox is in brick, with concrete lintels and a flat concrete roof. It has a single storey and a square plan with chamfered corners, and is surrounded by a bank of earth. On the northeast side is an entrance at each end, and the embrasures face to the south, with one facing north.
Pillbox: Square Type at SK 61808 35777; 52.91581°N 1.08211°W		1941	The pillbox is in brick, with concrete lintels and a flat concrete roof. It has a single storey and a square plan with chamfered corners. There is an entrance on the airfield side, and the embrasures face away from the airfield.
Pillbox: Square Type at SK 62380 35746; 52.91560°N 1.07376°W	—	1941	The pillbox is in brick, with concrete lintels and a flat concrete roof. It has a single storey and a square plan with chamfered corners. There is an entrance at on the west side, and the embrasures face away from the airfield.
Pillbox: Type 22 at SK 61509 36099; 52.91883°N 1.08664°W		1941	The pillbox is in brick, with concrete lintels and a flat concrete roof. It has a single storey and a hexagonal plan, with embrasures facing eastwards towards the airfield. It is partly sunken, with steps down to the southern entrance, and it has its own drainage facility.
Pillbox: Type 22 at SK 61872 36068; 52.91851°N 1.08122°W	—	1941	The pillbox is in brick, with concrete lintels and a flat concrete roof. It has a single storey and a hexagonal plan, with embrasures facing eastwards towards the airfield. It is partly sunken, with steps down to the western entrance.
Pillbox: Type 22 at SK 62400 36143; 52.91912°N 1.07337°W	—	1941	The pillbox is in brick, with concrete lintels and a flat concrete roof. It has a single storey and a hexagonal plan, with the entrance to the south, and the embrasures facing towards the airfield.
Pillbox: Type 22 at SK 61542 36446; 52.92194°N 1.08608°W	—	1941	The pillbox is in brick, with concrete lintels and a flat concrete roof. It has a single storey and a hexagonal plan, with the entrance to the north, and the embrasures facing southeast towards the airfield.
Pillbox: Type 22 at SK 61883 36695; 52.92417°N 1.08075°W		1941	The pillbox is in brick, with concrete lintels and a flat concrete roof. It has a single storey and a hexagonal plan, with the entrance to the northwest, and the embrasures facing south towards the airfield.
Pillbox: Type 22 at SK 62290 36703; 52.92367°N 1.07503°W		1941	The pillbox is in brick, with concrete lintels and a flat concrete roof. It has a single storey and a hexagonal plan. The pillbox is overgrown in a hedgerow, the embrasures face towards the airfield, and the entrance is obscured.
Pillbox: Type 22 at SK 61611 35840; 52.91650°N 1.08517°W		1941	The pillbox is in brick, with concrete lintels and a flat concrete roof. It has a single storey and a hexagonal plan, with embrasures facing eastwards towards the airfield. It is partly sunken, with the entrance on the west side.
Pillbox: Type 22 at SK 61862 35859; 52.91661°N 1.08142°W	—	1941	The pillbox is in brick, with concrete lintels and a flat concrete roof. It has a single storey and a hexagonal plan, with embrasures facing eastwards towards the airfield. It is partly sunken, with the entrance on the west side.
