= Listed buildings in Keyworth =

Keyworth is a civil parish in the Rushcliffe district of Nottinghamshire, England that contains the village of Keyworth. It has eight listed buildings recorded in the National Heritage List for England, consisting of a church, houses, barns, and former framework knitters' workshops. One is listed Grade I, the highest of the three grades; the others are at Grade II, the lowest grade.

== Key ==
Grade	Criteria
I	Buildings of exceptional interest, sometimes considered to be internationally important
II	Buildings of national importance and special interest

== Buildings ==
Name and location	Photograph	Date	Notes	Grade
Church of St Mary Magdalene; 52.87152°N 1.08935°W		14th century	The church has been altered and extended through the centuries, and was restored in 1874 and 1884. It is built in stone with some brick, and has roofs of tile and lead. It consists of a nave, a north aisle, north and south porches, a north vestry, a southwest chapel, a chancel and a west steeple. The steeple has a tower with two stages on a deep plinth, with gabled and crocketed angle buttresses, gargoyles, panelled pilaster strips, and clock faces, above which is a rectangular plinth and a parapet. Surmounting the tower is a recessed octagonal turret with openings on the sides, gargoyles, an embattled parapet and a dwarf spire.	I
Barn at 31 Main Street; 52.87003°N 1.08958°W		1651	The barn is in timber framing with herringbone brick nogging and red brick on a stone plinth, with a pantile roof. It contains a large doorway with a fanlight and an initialled and dated lintel. To the right is a later extension.	II
Barn adjoining 15 Main Street and outbuildings 52.87059°N 1.08933°W		Late 17th century	The barn is in red brick on a plinth, with some timber framing and stone, and a roof of tile and pantile. There are two storeys and five bays. The barn contains a doorway, a casement window and vents. At the rear are outbuildings in red brick on stone plinths.	II
19 Main Street; 52.87036°N 1.08942°W		Late 18th century	A house, later an office, in red brick, with stone dressings, and a slate roof with stone coped gables. There are two storeys and attics, and three bays. The central doorway has reeded pilasters, a fanlight, and a bracketed pediment. The windows are sashes with wedge lintels and keystones.	II
Framework knitters' workshop and privies behind 69–73 Nottingham Road; 52.87577°N 1.08969°W	—	c. 1800	The workshop and privies are in brick. The workshop has a slate roof and two storeys. In the ground floor are doorways, and external steps lead to an upper floor doorway. The upper floor contains eleven-light casement windows. To the west is a single-storey privy block with a pantile roof.	II
15 Main Street; 52.87050°N 1.08936°W		Early 19th century	A red brick cottage with a tile roof, two storeys and two bays. The windows are sashes, and the doorway and the window in the ground floor have flush wedge lintels.	II
17 Main Street; 52.87048°N 1.08894°W		Early 19th century	The house is in red brick with a tile roof, two storeys and attics, and three bays. The central doorway has a fanlight and a hood, the windows in the lower two floors are sashes, and those in the top floor are casements. The openings in the lower two floors have flush wedge lintels.	II
Framework knitters' workshop behind 4 and 6 Wysall Lane; 52.86795°N 1.09063°W	—	Early 19th century	The workshop, later used for other purposes, is in whitewashed brick with a pantile roof. There are two storeys and two bays. It contains a doorway with a segmental arch and a doorway above, and casement windows, continuous in the upper floor.	II
