= Nottingham (Tollerton) Airport =

Airport serving Nottingham, England

Nottingham Airport

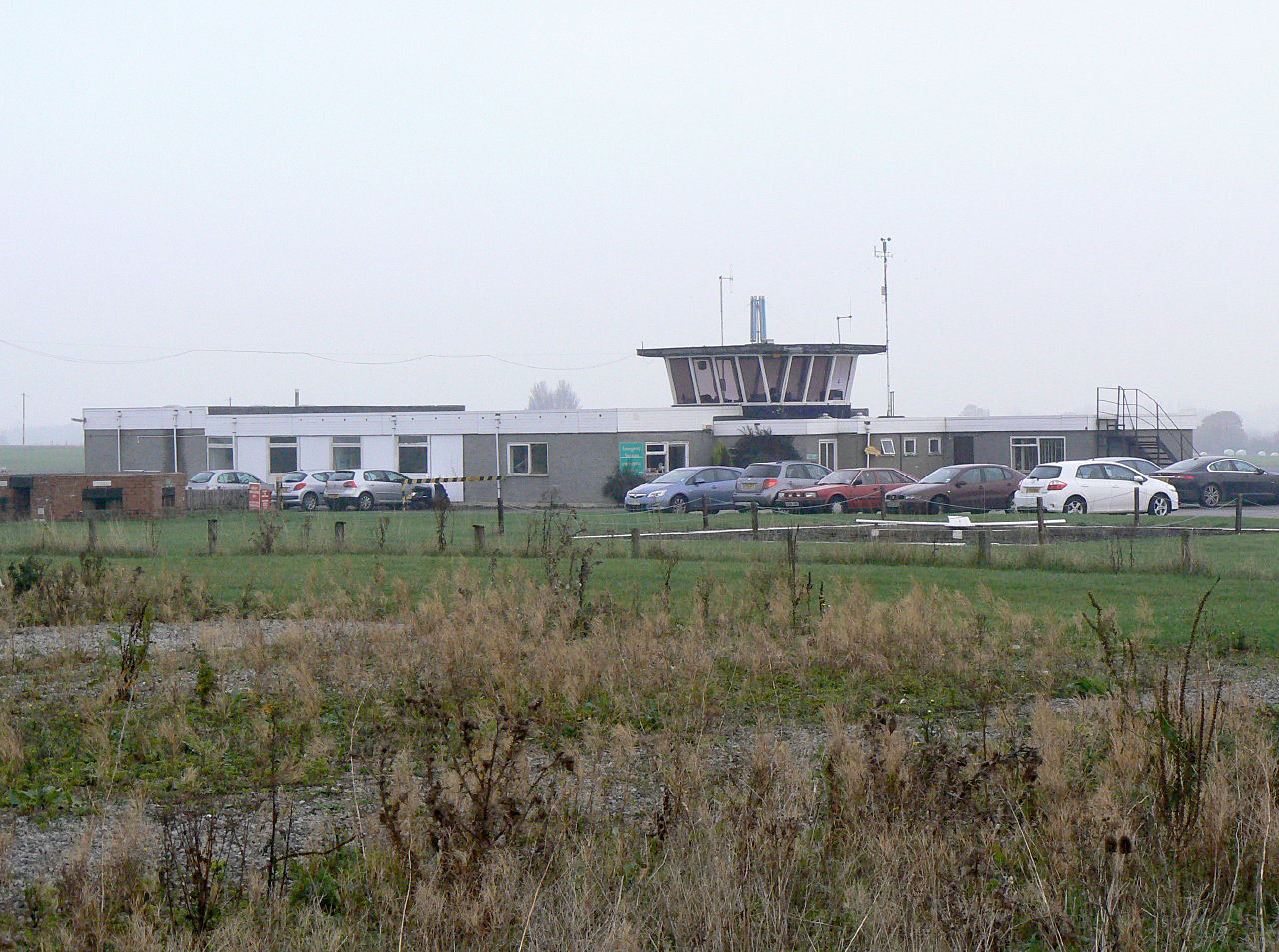
- IATA: NQT; ICAO: EGBN

Summary
- Airport type: Private
- Owner: Vistry Housing
- Operator: Truman Aviation Ltd.
- Serves: Nottingham
- Location: Tollerton, Nottinghamshire, England
- Closed: 6 June 2025 (partial)
- Elevation AMSL: 138 ft (42 m)
- Coordinates: 52°55′12″N 001°04′45″W
- Website: Nottingham City Airport

Map
- Location in Nottinghamshire

Runways
Direction	Length		Surface
Direction	m	ft	Surface
09/27	1,050	3,445	Asphalt/concrete
03/21	821	2,694	Asphalt
- Sources: UK AIP at NATS

Nottingham Airport (IATA: NQT, ICAO: EGBN), also known as Nottingham City Airport, is a municipal airport located in Tollerton, Nottinghamshire, England. It is situated 3 miles (4.8 km) southeast of Nottingham City Centre, and signposted on the A52 at Trent Bridge and on the A606 - this makes it one of the closest airports to a city centre in the UK. Although operating under a temporary fixed-wing embargo, the aerodrome is equipped for private aviation, business aviation and flight instruction and continues rotary operations for civilian, military, and emergency services (per this NOTAM).

Nottingham City Aerodrome has a CAA Ordinary Licence (Number P491) that allows flights for the public transport of passengers or for flying instruction as authorised by the licensee (Truman Aviation Limited).

In March 2025, Vistry Group, who had recently acquired the site, served a three-month notice to quit on airfield-operator Truman Aviation with a last-date of 6 June. After notice to quit expired the airport continues to operate to rotary traffic.

== History ==
On 27 July 1929 Nottingham (Tollerton) Airport became Britain's second licensed municipal aerodrome and the first to have a permanent site (Manchester's short-lived Wythenshawe aerodrome had the first such licence from April 1929 but was replaced by Barton Aerodrome in early 1930). Initially leased to National Flying Services Ltd who built a clubhouse and the first hangar in early 1930, the aerodrome was officially opened by Director of Civil Aviation Sir Sefton Brancker on 19 June 1930.

The Nottingham Flying Club moved in from nearby Hucknall in September 1931 but National Flying Services vacated the site in 1934.

During the Second World War, the aerodrome was requisitioned by the Air Ministry for RAF use and was known as RAF Tollerton. and acted as a relief landing ground for the Polish Training School based at RAF Newton for the Polish Air Force and, based in a large factory hangar built at the aerodrome in 1938, Field Aircraft Services Ltd carried out major overhauls, repairs, modifications on various RAF bomber and transport aircraft, particularly Avro Lancasters. Three hard runways were constructed in early 1941 and additional hangars including a rare Ministry of Aircraft Production 'R' type hangar, a second Bellman hangar and other RAF buildings were added too. Defences against ground attack were improved by the addition of eighteen brick-and-concrete pillboxes.

Post-war, the airfield returned to civilian use including a short-lived period as a commercial airport, with Blue Line Airways and Trent Valley Aviation operating from there from 1946 until 1948, when its aircraft passed on to British Eagle. Since 1948 Tollerton has accommodated only private light aircraft and more recently helicopters. Derek Truman of Truman Aviation organised popular annual airshows from 1967 to 1980 and the airport hosted three prestigious King's Cup Air Races in 1967, 1968 and 1970.

A purpose-built control tower was built in 1967 and is still in use today, but before this, the only air traffic control facilities were an RAF flying control caravan which had departed when the RAF moved out in 1956.

The 227-acre (0.92 km^{2}) airport was purchased in December 2006 from Nottingham City Council, by a consortium called Nottingham City Airport plc., and a programme of improvements was promised. Most of the remaining 1930s and 1940s hangars and other older buildings gradually became disused and were demolished particularly in the last 15–20 years.

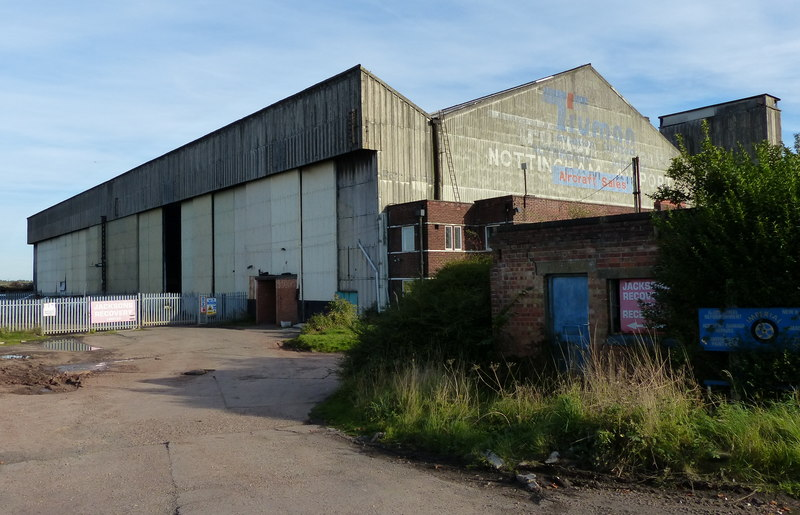
Old Fleet Services 'R' type hangar

All 18 WW2 air defences survive and have been nationally designated as Grade II Listed buildings by English Heritage (now Historic England) since 2012.

In 2017, the 1940s 'R' type hangar was demolished as a result of it being unsafe. It housed the repairs of the Avro Lancaster from 1943 to 1946. Spire Hospital is now in its place.

== Site contaminations ==
The Bellman hangar was demolished by 1978 and eventually that immediate location was turned into a site for a number of Park Homes. Following an above average incidences of Acute Myeloid Leukaemia amongst residents of the Park Homes, Rushcliffe Borough Council undertook a radiological survey of the residential site in 2008. That survey detected radiation hotspots of Radium, a radioactive isotope with a half-life of c. 1,600 years. The residents of Tollerton Park estate were not informed of these findings at the time.

=== Source of contamination ===
In the latter stages of WWII RAF Tollerton was a location given over to the destruction of surplus aircraft. Over 1,000 aircraft, including heavy bombers, were flown into Tollerton and disposed of through the Burn, Bash, and Bury method. To aid night vision for aircrew, the controls of most WWII aircraft were painted with a compound solution which included Radium (because its radioluminescence properties made it glow in the dark). The Bash, Burn, and Bury method of aircraft disposal was unencapsulated and all pollutants would have dispersed onto the ground around the airfield. The only part of the airfield to be surveyed for radiological contamination is the Tollerton Park estate. Non-radiological contaminants have been detected through the various Fluxgate surveys, and a partial-location survey carried out by the developer who wishes to build houses on this land. A portion of the southern half of the airfield was used as fire training and is known to be contaminated with PFAS chemicals.

=== Closure ===
In early 2024, plans were announced for the potential closure of Nottingham City Airport due to a proposed major new housing development by Vistry Group, who had acquired the site in June 2022. A hybrid planning application was submitted to Rushcliffe Borough Council and validated on 11 March 2024. The controversial plans faced a backlash from the local population and users of the airport.

In March 2025, Vistry served a three-month notice to quit as airfield-operator Truman Aviation, who had previously owned the site, with a last-date of 6 June 2025. This notice to quit has expired, with civilian, military, police, and air ambulance operations continued to operate rotary traffic as per this in-force NOTAM. Vistry maintain the airport would eventually close as planned, despite the ongoing campaign against the proposed development on the site.

== Facilities ==
The airport primarily serves general aviation and has two runways: 09/27 and 03/21 which are 1,050 m × 30 m (3,445 ft × 98 ft) and 821 m × 23 m (2,694 ft × 75 ft) respectively. The longer runway is equipped with lighting for night flying, which operates during the winter flying season.
