= All Saints' Church, Stanton on the Wolds =

All Saints' Church, Stanton-on-the-Wolds
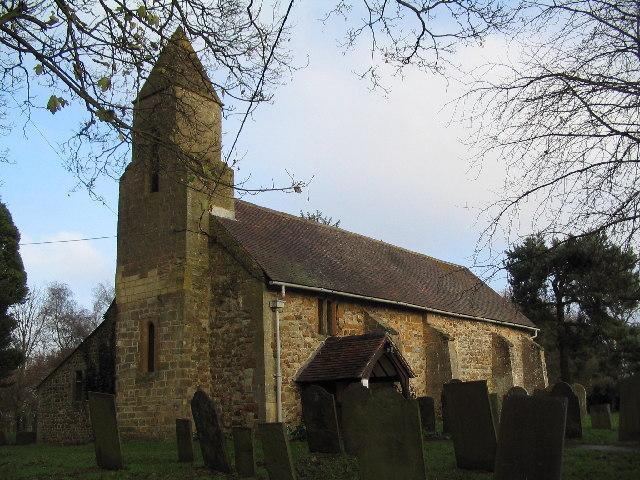
- All Saints' Church, Stanton-on-the-Wolds
- All Saints' Church, Stanton-on-the-Wolds
- 52°52′9.3″N 1°3′45.23″W
- OS grid reference: SK 63202 30618
- Location: Stanton-on-the-Wolds
- Country: England
- Denomination: Church of England

History
- Dedication: All Saints'

Architecture
- Heritage designation: Grade II listed

Administration
- Diocese: Diocese of Southwell and Nottingham
- Archdeaconry: Nottingham
- Deanery: East Bingham
- Parish: Stanton on the Wolds

All Saints' Church, Stanton-on-the-Wolds is a Grade II listed parish church in the Church of England in Stanton-on-the-Wolds.

== History ==
The church dates from the 11th century. It was restored in 1889 and 1952. The church is united in one benefice with

- St Mary Magdalene's Church, Keyworth
- St Mary's Church, Bunny
- Bradmore Mission Room

Several groups of tombstones in the churchyard are Grade II listed.

== See also ==
- Listed buildings in Stanton-on-the-Wolds
