= Tollerton, Nottinghamshire =

Village and civil parish in Nottinghamshire, England

Coordinates: 52.901°N 1.094°W

Tollerton
- Village and civil parish
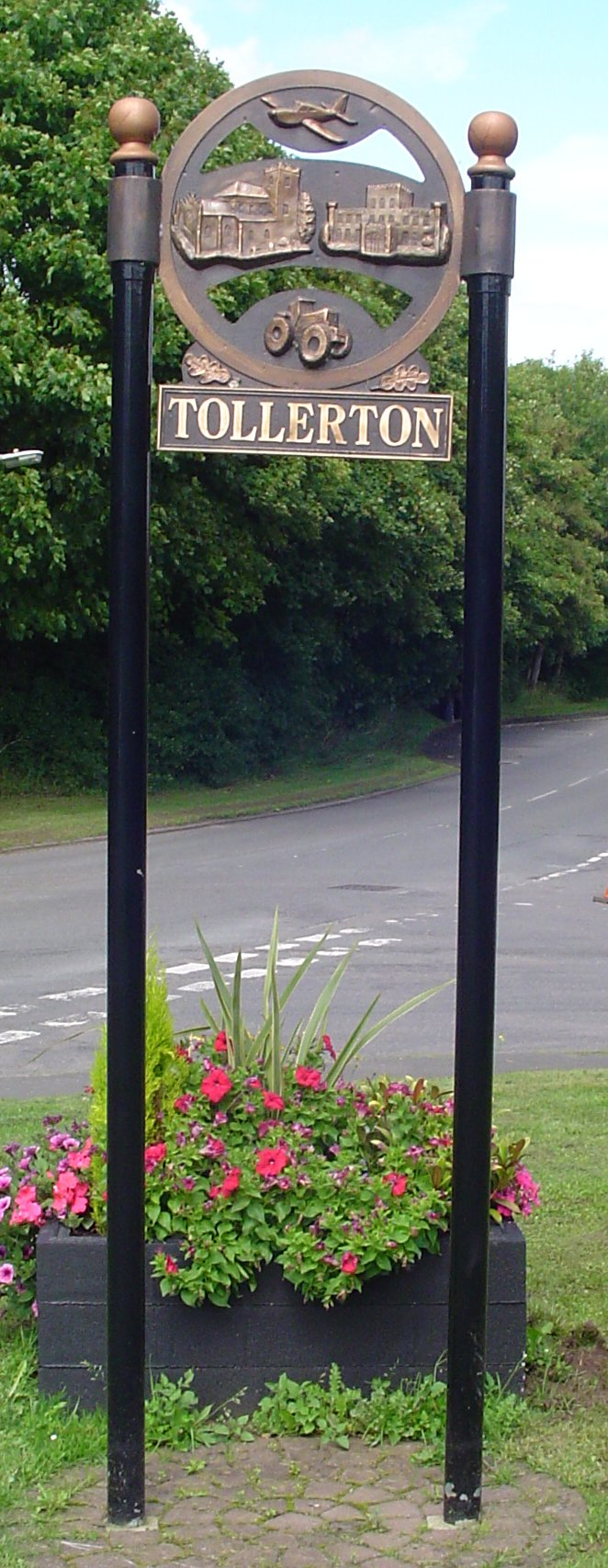
- Signpost

- Location within Nottinghamshire
- Interactive map of Tollerton
- Area: 2.83 sq mi (7.3 km^{2})
- Population: 1,915 (2021 Census)
  - Density: 677/sq mi (261/km^{2})
- OS grid reference: SK 610341
  - London: 105 mi (169 km) SSE
- District: Rushcliffe
- Shire county: Nottinghamshire
- Region: East Midlands
- Country: England
- Sovereign state: United Kingdom
- Post town: NOTTINGHAM
- Postcode district: NG12
- Dialling code: 0115
- Police: Nottinghamshire
- Fire: Nottinghamshire
- Ambulance: East Midlands
- UK Parliament: Rushcliffe
- Website: http://www.tollertonparishcouncil.gov.uk

Tollerton is an English village and civil parish in the Rushcliffe district of Nottinghamshire, just south-east of Nottingham. Statistics from the 2021 census show the population of the village has increased to 1,915.

== Governance ==
Tollerton has a parish council and is represented on Rushcliffe Borough Council. It is part of the Rushcliffe constituency in the House of Commons.

== Tollerton Hall ==
St Hugh's College was founded in 1948 at Tollerton Hall by the Roman Catholic Diocese of Nottingham as its junior seminary, accepting boys from aged 11 upwards, but by 1969 it had opened its doors to secular students. It closed in 1986, leaving the hall as a corporate HQ until June 2017, when it was bought by a businessman, Ian Kershaw, for use as a private home again.

== Event and amenities ==
There is an annual village fayre held in June. This gathers residents around craft stalls, entertainments, refreshments and small exhibitions. The money generated helps local charities.

The pub named the Air Hostess recalls Nottingham Airport at Tollerton. It is unusual in having a piste for playing pétanque. It used to have a large carved sign depicting an air hostess. However, in 2011, the then owners of the premises, Everards Brewery, decided to refurbish them and in doing so replaced the original sign with a conventional hanging sign depicting an air hostess. This changed to a hanging sign depicting Tollerton Hall, an aircraft and fields. A scheme was put in operation to save the pub from closure by introducing local ownership. This led to the establishment of a community trust, in which shares were issued, and the pub freehold was purchased. It reopened with a new tenant landlord in July 2020.

Tollerton has two churches. St Peter's Anglican Church dates from the end of the 12th century. Developments in 1909 resulted in the church as it is today. There is a Methodist church located in a modern building at the village's southern border.

The few shops include a post office, a petrol station which includes a mini Waitrose, and a restaurant serving oriental-style food, The Charde. The village is host to a hairdressers, a pet shop and a pet salon. The Parish Rooms at the end of the parade of shops in Burnside Grove serve as a centre for local community activities and meetings. Regular pop-up shops visit the village.

Outdoor amenities include a park with an multi-use games area for five-a-side football, basketball and tennis and a full-sized grass main football pitch.

The park was refurbished with new children's play equipment in April 2008 and again more recently through the active Tollerton project. This added the first interactive play equipment in Rushcliffe, the largest single piece of adventure play equipment produced for a UK park by manufacturer Produlic, and a community gym.

== Education ==
Tollerton Primary School takes children of 5–11 years of age. It is a member of Equals Trust Multi Academy Trust, based in nearby Keyworth.

Tollerton Playgroup, next to the primary in Burnside Grove, caters for children under five. The nearest secondary school is South Wolds Academy and Sixth Form in Keyworth.

== Economy ==
Tollerton is within easy commuting distance of Nottingham, Newark, Leicester and Loughborough. The village has good internet access allowing many residents to work from home. Agricultural employment remains, along with various local businesses. Just outside the village is the now closed, Nottingham Airport The site was closed on 6 June 2025, following the sale of the site to the Vistry Group to build 4,000 houses. All the businesses on the airfield were given 3 months to vacate, leading to many lost jobs.The planning permission has not at this time been approved, but Rushcliffe Borough Council seem intent to let this application to go ahead despite growing public concern. The Spire Hospital, part of the Spire Healthcare Group, is located on the edge of the airport.

== Transport ==
The nearest railway station is Nottingham, five miles to the northwest. Tollerton is served by two bus stops in Melton Road for "The Keyworth" Trent Barton service between Keyworth and Nottingham city centre. It runs every 15 minutes.

The southern edge of the village lies on Melton Road (A606), adjacent to Wheatcroft Roundabout, where the A52 and the A606 meet. This provides good links from the village to Nottingham, the M1 motorway, and surrounding places such as Melton Mowbray and Leicester.

== Freedom of the Parish ==
The following people and military units have received the Freedom of the Parish of Tollerton.

=== Individuals ===
- Julian Smith: January 2022.

== See also ==
- Listed buildings in Tollerton, Nottinghamshire

== Gallery ==
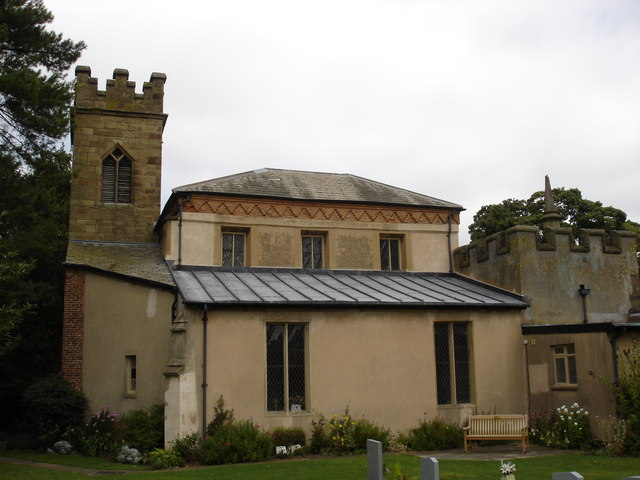
St Peter's Church

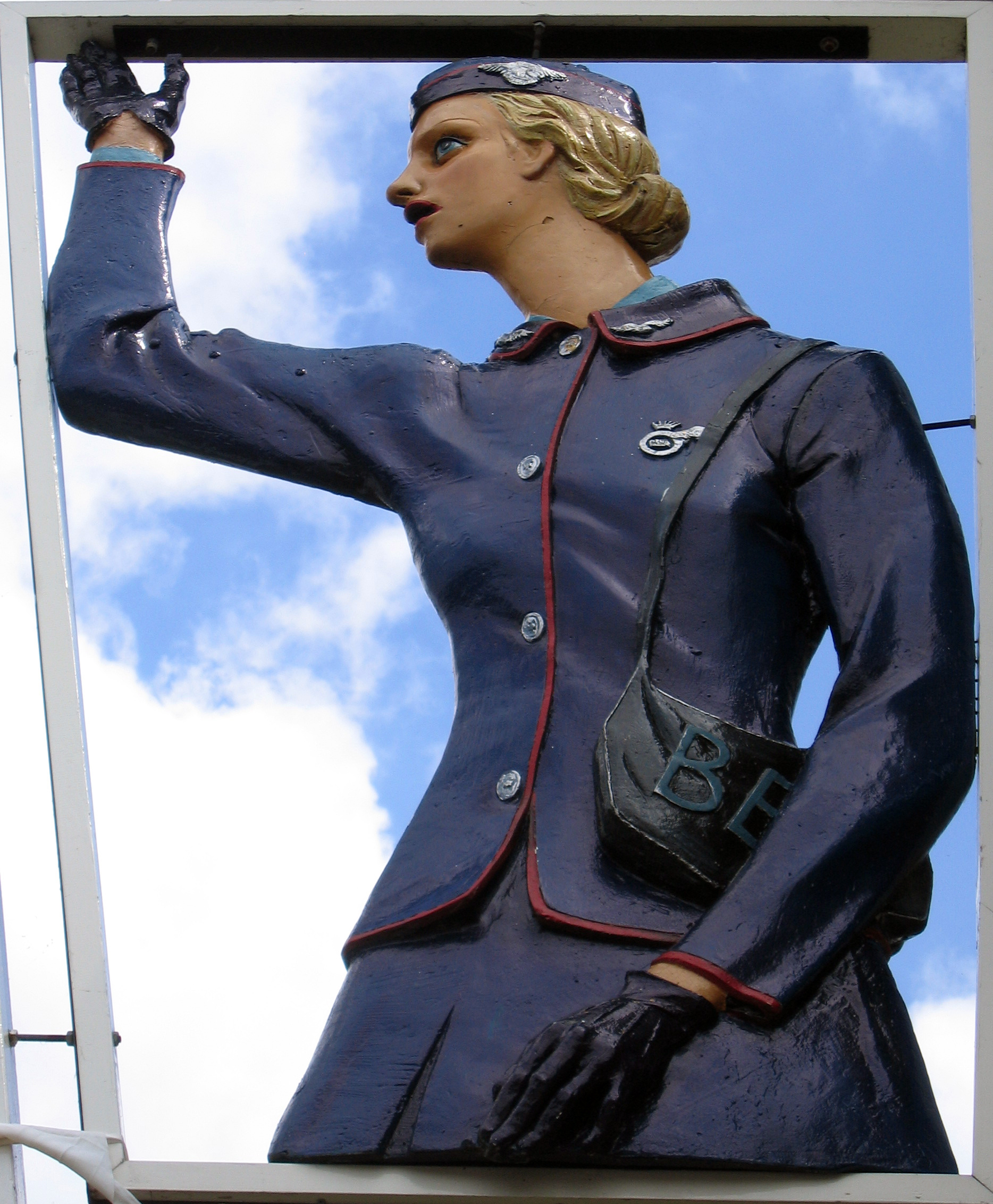
The original carved Air Hostess pub sign

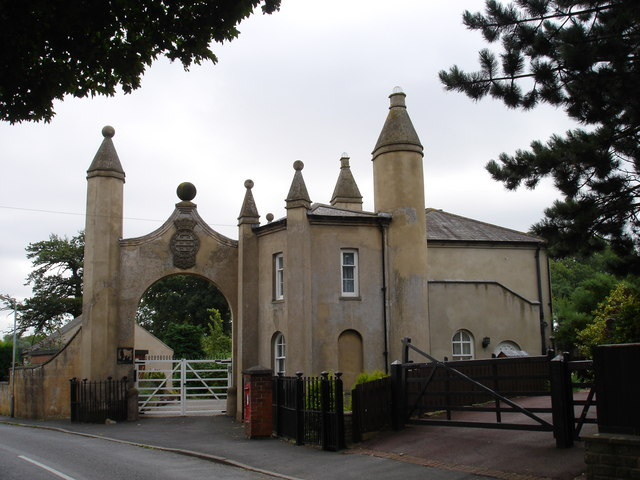
Gate House in Cotgrave Lane

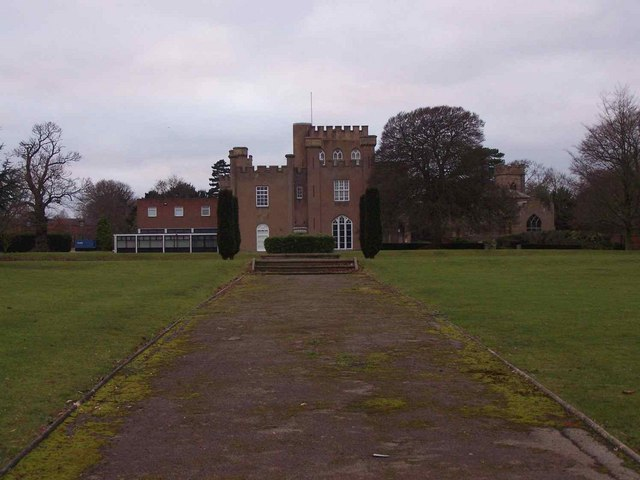
Tollerton Hall and Church
