= Listed buildings in Normanton-on-the-Wolds =

Normanton-on-the-Wolds is a civil parish in the Rushcliffe district of Nottinghamshire, England. The parish contains four listed buildings that are recorded in the National Heritage List for England. All the listed buildings are designated at Grade II, the lowest of the three grades, which is applied to "buildings of national importance and special interest". The parish contains the village of Normanton-on-the-Wolds and the surrounding area. All the listed buildings are in the village, and consist of houses, a farmhouse, and associated structures.

== Buildings ==
Name and location	Photograph	Date	Notes
Normanton Grange and The Mews; 52.88876°N 1.07546°W		Mid 18th century	A house and a former stable block converted into a house. The house is in rendered red brick on a plinth, with floor bands, dentilled eaves, and a roof of tile and slate. There are two storeys and attics, and two bays. To the left is a two-storey two-bay wing, and to the right is a two-storey two-bay wing that has a caned bay window with a conical roof, and a doorway with pilaster strips, a panelled frieze and a hood. On the right is a two-storey single-bay lean-to, to the rear is a two-storey two-bay wing, and in the angle is a porch that has a doorway with a fanlight. To the rear is a two-storey wing and a single storey wing, projecting from which is the former stable block.
Avenue Farmhouse, wall and gate piers 52.88925°N 1.07456°W		Late 18th century	The farmhouse is in red brick, with a floor band, a modillion eaves cornice and a hipped slate roof. There are two storeys and cellars, and five bays. In the centre is a rendered porch with a parapet, imposts, and a round-headed doorway with a fanlight. The windows are sashes with moulded surrounds and wedge lintels, and there are four cellar openings. Enclosing the front garden is a red brick wall containing a gateway flanked by red brick piers with moulded painted caps and painted plaster acorn finials.
Outbuilding, Avenue Farm; 52.88935°N 1.07435°W	—	Late 18th century	The outbuilding is in painted brick with dentilled eaves, and a pantile roof with coped gables and kneelers. There is a single storey, and a single bay with a doorway. The building is flanked by lean-tos, that on the left projecting.
Normanton House; 52.88969°N 1.07678°W		Late 18th century	A red brick house with some stucco, on a painted plinth, with rusticated stucco quoin strips, a sill band, a modillion eaves cornice, and a hipped tile roof. There are two storeys, attics and cellars, and three bays. The central doorway has a rusticated stucco surround, a fanlight and a keystone. The windows are sashes, those in the ground floor with similar surrounds to the doorway, and those in the upper floors with stucco surrounds and keystones, and there are two cellar openings with wedge lintels. On the side walls are octagonal bays, and at the rear is a wing with a coped gable, and beyond that a later range.
