= Church of St Mary Magdalene, Keyworth =

Church in Nottinghamshire, England

Coordinates: 52.8714°N 1.0894°W

St. Mary Magdalene, Keyworth
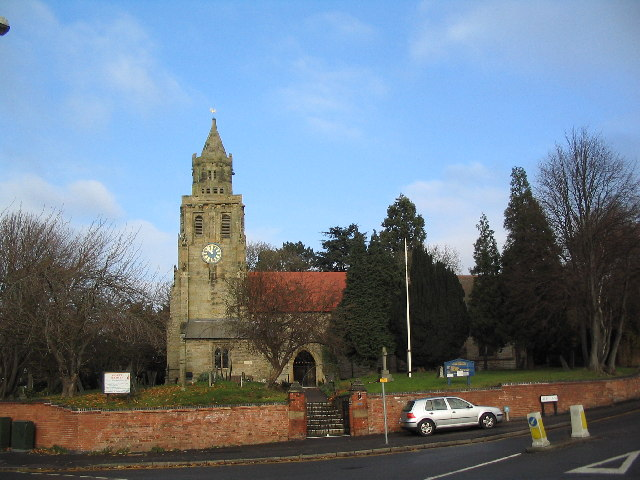
- St. Mary Magdalene, Keyworth
- St. Mary Magdalene, Keyworth
- Location: Keyworth, Nottinghamshire
- Country: England
- Denomination: Church of England
- Churchmanship: Broad Church

History
- Status: Parish church
- Dedication: St. Mary Magdalene

Architecture
- Functional status: Active
- Heritage designation: Grade I listed
- Designated: 1 December 1965
- Style: Gothic

Administration
- Province: York
- Diocese: Diocese of Southwell and Nottingham
- Archdeaconry: Nottingham
- Deanery: East Bingham
- Benefice: Keyworth and Stanton-on-the Wolds and Bunny w Brad
- Parish: Keyworth

The Church of St. Mary Magdalene is a Grade-I listed church located in Keyworth, Nottinghamshire, England.

== Description ==
The church dates from the fourteenth century. Nikolaus Pevsner noted that the tower of the church is unique in the county.

It was restored by George Frederick Bodley between 1871 and 1874 who replaced the roofs and were responsible for the chancel arch. The work included a new stone floor, new south-west window, new lighting. The stonework was undertaken by Goliath Hitchcock of Keyworth, the building, plastering and tiling to Mr. Crofts of Keyworth, the woodwork by Mr. S. White of Whatton and the new windows and leadwork by Sollory and Son, Mount Street, Nottingham at a cost of £1,365 (equivalent to £133,454 in 2025). During the work various gifts were made including the east window at a cost of £86 (equivalent to £8,408 in 2025) by Burlison and Grylls. The pulpit was given in remembrance if Mr. R. T. Flinders of Keyworth. The oak lectern from Miss Burnside of Ratcliffe.

The church shares a Rector with

- Bradmore Mission Room
- St Mary's Church, Bunny
- All Saints' Church, Stanton on the Wolds

== Stained glass ==
Early work by Burlison and Grylls.

== Clock ==
The first clock had the date of 1796. A new clock was built by G. & F. Cope which required winding every eight days. The clock was installed and set going on 24 August 1893 by Major Roberston of Widmerpol Hall.

== List of incumbents ==
- 1270 Ralph Barre
- 1270 Nicholas de Leyton
- 1272 Hugh de Stapilford
- 1288 Hugh de Barri
- 1303 Henry de Byngham
- 1312 Ralp Rosell
- 1362 Richard de Barewe
- 1379 Micholas Lawe
- Nicholas Goodyer
- 1407 Robert Chubbe
- John Leake
- 1420 William Worsley
- 1421 William Averham
- 1423 William FitzHenry de Whatton
- 1434 William Isabell
- John Brounfled
- 1471 Nicholas Spede
- 1502 Henry Ridyng
- 1515 Robert Freman
- 1531 John Cokys
- 1543 Laurence Lee
- 1548 John Browne
- 1585 William Barker
- 1619 William Smyth
- 1656 Philip Ormeston
- 1660 William Goodall
- 1708 Charles Drury
- 1715 Thomas Wood
- 1728 Edward Moises
- 1751 Richard Barnard
- 1783 Thomas Beaumont
- 1794 Sampson Parkyns
- 1801 William Beetham
- 1833 John Champion
- 1834 Edward Thompson
- 1842 John Hancock
- 1859 Alfred Potter
- 1878 Henry Pratt Ling
- 1928 P W Rushmer
- 1930 A D Brooker
- 1949 George Fry
- 1960 Jack Gibson
- 1970 John Ottey
- 1985 John Hardy
- 1994 Trevor Sisson
- 2007 James Frederick Wellington

== See also ==
- Grade I listed buildings in Nottinghamshire
- Listed buildings in Keyworth
