= Listed buildings in Stanton-on-the-Wolds =

Stanton-on-the-Wolds is a civil parish in the Rushcliffe district of Nottinghamshire, England. The parish contains four listed buildings that are recorded in the National Heritage List for England. All the listed buildings are designated at Grade II, the lowest of the three grades, which is applied to "buildings of national importance and special interest". The parish contains the village of Stanton-on-the-Wolds and the surrounding area. All the listed buildings are in the village, and consist of a church, two groups of tombstones in the churchyard, and a war memorial.

== Buildings ==
| Name and location | Photograph | Date | Notes |
|---|---|---|---|
| All Saints' Church; 52.86939°N 1.06250°W | | 14th century | The church has been altered and extended through the centuries, including restorations in 1830 and 1889, and a new vestry was added in 1977. It is built in stone with a tile roof, and consists of a nave and a chancel under a continuous roof, a south porch, a northwest vestry, and a west tower. The tower is square, and contains a chamfered lancet window, two bell openings with pointed heads, and a pyramidal spire. |
| Group of eight tombstones 52.86931°N 1.06248°W | | 1706 | The headstones are in the churchyard of All Saints' Church. They are in slate, arranged in two rows, and are elaborately inherited and dated. The dates are between 1706 and 1859. |
| Group of ten tombstones 52.86932°N 1.06264°W | | 1719 | The headstones are in the churchyard of All Saints' Church. They are in slate, arranged in three rows, and are elaborately inherited and dated. The dates are between 1719 and 1849. |
| War memorial 52.86912°N 1.06238°W | | 1920 | The war memorial was moved to its present site in 1999. It is in limestone, and in the form of a Celtic cross. The cross stands on a tapering square plinth, and its front, in metal relief, is an inscription and the names of those lost in the First World War. |
