= St Peter's Church, Tollerton =

Coordinates: 52.906878°N 1.086147°W

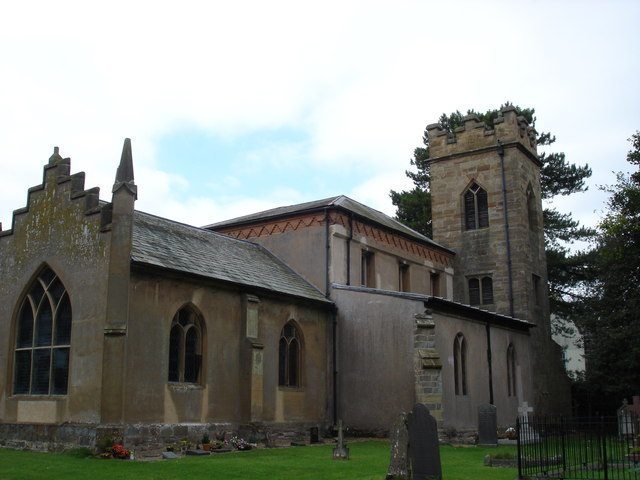
- St Peter's Church, Tollerton
- Location: Tollerton, Nottinghamshire
- Country: England
- Denomination: Church of England
- Churchmanship: Broad church
- Website: https://stpeters-tollerton.org.uk/

History
- Dedication: St Peter

Architecture
- Heritage designation: Grade II listed

Administration
- Province: York
- Diocese: Southwell and Nottingham
- Parish: Tollerton

Clergy
- Rector: Rev. Alan Howe

St. Peter's Church is a Grade-II listed church located in Tollerton, Nottinghamshire, England.

== History ==
There has been a church in Tollerton since before the Norman Conquest but its site is not known. The present church's foundations were laid towards the end of the 12th Century. Little is known of the medieval church except that it had a gabled tower.

It was customary for the rector to maintain the chancel and for the villagers – usually the squire – to maintain the nave. Various squires did little or no repair work and the nave became a ruin.

Then in 1812 Pendock Barry started a renovation scheme. He rebuilt the nave, constructed the mausoleum and built a brick extension to the west end that contained a porch with vestries and a gallery. The gallery was for his family's use.

When the rector died in 1816 the new incumbent was persuaded to give the squire a free hand. He pulled down the chancel and rebuilt it.

Restoration work also took place in 1909 to make the church look as it does today.

Originally donated in 1909 by WE Burnside of Tollerton Hall and installed at a cost of £595, the organ was overhauled and cleaned in the 1930s by Roger Yates, and a Tremulant stop added to the Swell.

== See also ==
- Listed buildings in Tollerton, Nottinghamshire
