= Edmund King (campaigner) =

British public relations professional

Edmund King OBE (born March 1958) is a British public relations professional, best known for media appearances on the subject of motorists in his role as President of The Automobile Association.

King was educated at St Hugh's College, Tollerton, Nottinghamshire and studied politics at the University of Newcastle-upon-Tyne, where he has since returned as Visiting Professor of Transport.

Starting out as a civil servant, King worked as a committee secretary for the Social Science Research Council, and for a Government Department in Whitehall. He has worked around the world, in public relations for Bouchard Aine et Fils, a Burgundy wine producer, in the motor industry in California, and as a broadcaster in Los Angeles. He also has a postgraduate diploma in broadcasting from Santa Monica College.

Returning to the UK, King became Campaigns Co-Coordinator for the British Road Federation and then joined the RAC Limited, becoming the first director of the RAC Foundation in 1999. In 2008, he became President of The Automobile Association.

He is a member of the transport sector panel of The Institution of Engineering and Technology. He is also a fellow of the Chartered Institute of Public Relations, fellow of the Public Relations Consultants Association and a committee member of the Motor Industry Public Affairs Association.

Although well known as a champion of motorists, King is also a keen cyclist, he was convicted of cycling without due care following his riding into a large group of football supporters in 2007 and in 2012 made headlines by condemning cyclist-hating drivers as "absolute idiots".

He was appointed Officer of the Order of the British Empire (OBE) in the 2016 New Year Honours for services to road safety.

King lives in St Albans. His interests include antiques, wine tasting and Norwich City Football Club.
