= St Hugh's College, Tollerton =

Coordinates: 52.906479°N 1.085292°W

St Hugh's College
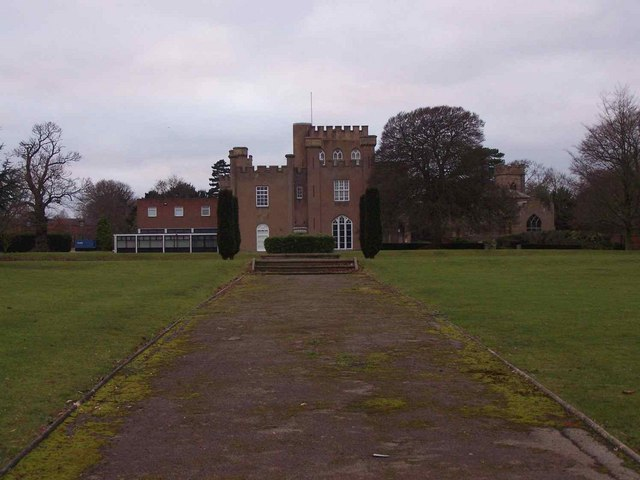
- Tollerton, Nottinghamshire; England

Information
- Type: Private day and boarding
- Motto: Fidelis Servus "Faithful Servant"
- Religious affiliation: Roman Catholic
- Established: 1948
- Founders: Diocese of Nottingham, Edward Ellis
- Closed: 1986
- Gender: Male
- Age: 11 to 18
- Houses: Beauvale, Padley and Lincoln
- Colours: Green, silver and black
- Affiliated schools: Oscott College
- Patron saint: Hugh of Lincoln

St Hugh's College (also referred to as Tollerton Hall and Roclaveston Manor) was a Roman Catholic minor seminary in Tollerton founded by the Diocese of Nottingham. The manor house dates to 1792, and the college was founded on the premises in 1948. It closed in 1986 and is a Grade II listed building.

== Tollerton Hall ==
Tollerton Hall was reconstructed on multiple occasions since the eighteenth century. In 1792, it was a large house with an estate of several hundred acres. In 1864, Whites Directory stated that the grounds were 'extensive and tastefully laid out with shrubs and flowers, with a fine piece of water with a small woody island'.

In the nineteenth century, several Gothic Revival towers, turrets, pinnacles and battlements were added. After 1929, it ceased to be a private house and the owners turned it into a residential sports club and hotel.

During World War II it was requisitioned by the government and used for training for the D-Day landings by the British Royal Army, the RAF and American paratroopers. After the landings, it was used a prisoner of war camp where German and Italian prisoners were guarded by the Polish Army. In 1946, the hall was derelict and decaying.

== St Hugh's College ==
In 1946, it was bought by the Roman Catholic Diocese of Nottingham to be used as a minor seminary. It was opened by the Archbishop of Westminster, Cardinal Bernard Griffin in 1948. Originally, it only accepted boys from the age of 11 years and older who were Roman Catholic. In 1969, it allowed non-Roman Catholic boys to start at the school. It was staffed by a mixture of diocesan priests, Franciscan nuns and lay teachers.

== Roclaveston Manor ==
In 1980, the estate occupied about 118 acres of park, woods and arable farm land. In 1986, it was sold by the diocese. Much of the Gothic Revival stonework had removed for safety reasons because of stonework decay. It is currently owned by The Oval Group, as their headquarters and offices. Former students of the school refer to themselves as 'Old Hugonians'.

== See also ==
- Listed buildings in Tollerton, Nottinghamshire

== Gallery ==
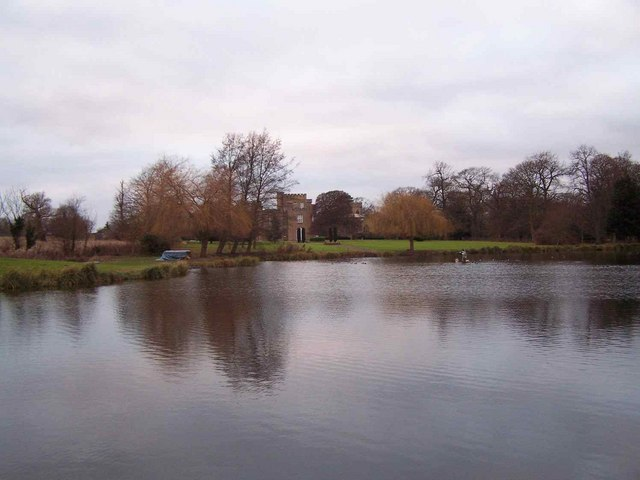
Lake front

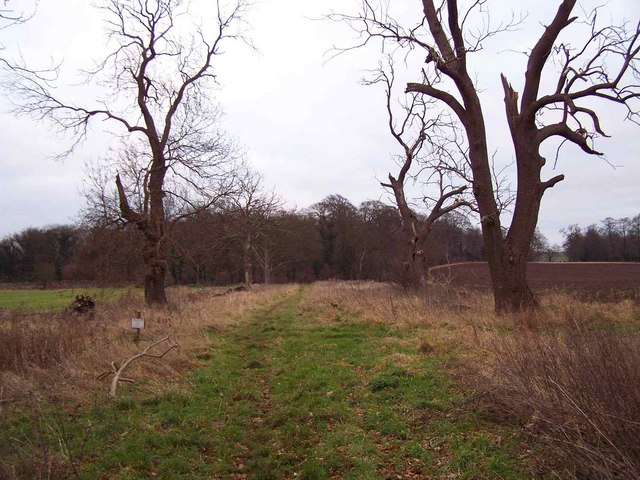
Footpath around the site

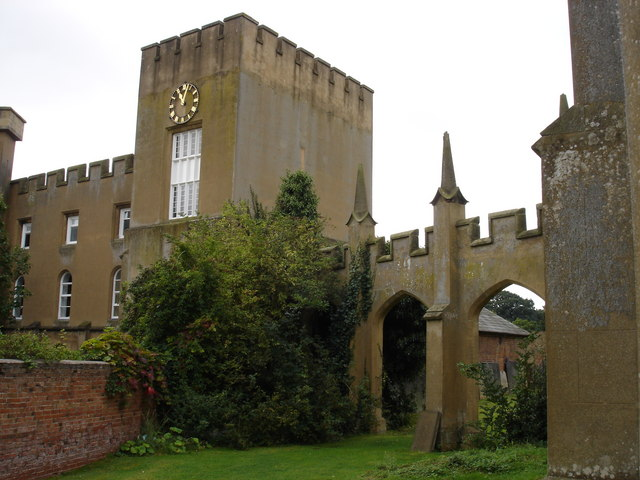
Churchyard

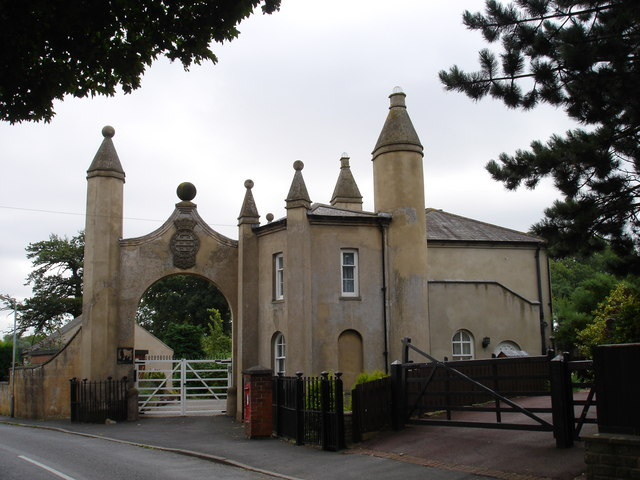
Gate house
