= Edmund King (cricketer, born 1907) =

English cricketer

Personal information
- Full name: Edmund Poole King
- Born: 21 January 1907; Clifton, Bristol, England
- Died: 11 September 1990 (aged 83); Bampton, Devon, England
- Batting: Right-handed

Domestic team information
- Years: Team
- 1927: Gloucestershire

Career statistics
Competition	First-class
Matches	3
Runs scored	14
Batting average	3.50
100s/50s	–/–
Top score	6
Balls bowled	–
Wickets	–
Bowling average	–
5 wickets in innings	–
10 wickets in match	–
Best bowling	–
Catches/stumpings	1/–
- Source: Cricinfo, 31 July 2011

Edmund Poole King (21 January 1907 – 11 September 1990) was an English cricketer. King was a right-handed batsman. He was born at Clifton, Bristol, and was educated at Winchester College, where he represented the college cricket team.

King made his first-class debut for Gloucestershire against Glamorgan in the 1927 County Championship. He made 2 further first-class appearances, both in 1927, against Kent and Sussex. His 3 first-class matches were without success, with him scoring 14 runs at an average of 3.50, with a high score of 6.

He died at Bampton, Devon, on 11 September 1990.
