= South Wolds Academy =

Location
- Church Drive, Keyworth, Nottingham, NG12 5FF; Keyworth, Nottinghamshire; England
- Coordinates: 52.8734°N 1.0848°W

Information
- Motto: Lucem Quare ("Search for the Light")
- Established: 1967
- Trust: East Midlands Education Trust
- Department for Education URN: 138191 Tables
- Ofsted: Reports
- Head teacher: Halina Angus
- Gender: Coeducational
- Age range: 11-18
- Enrolment: 820
- Colour(s): Blue, black and silver
- Website: https://www.southwolds.co.uk/

The South Wolds Academy and Sixth Form (formerly known as South Wolds Community School, and before that, South Wolds Comprehensive) is a secondary school and sixth form with academy status, on Church Drive in Keyworth, Nottingham. It teaches students ages 11–18, and is non-denominational. It was opened in 1967, and has a capacity of 1,114 students, with a current enrolment figure of 820 (as of March 2020).

The school converted to an academy on 1 June 2012.

== Curriculum ==
The academy specialises in languages, and offers French and Spanish and formerly offered German and Japanese, with links to a school in Nagano, Japan. Japanese is the only exception to the vast majority of schools in England. As of September 2015, Southwolds no longer offers Japanese, German and Italian due to lack of staff.

== Uniform ==
A new school uniform was introduced in September 2013. It consists of black blazers, black trousers and a white shirt with a royal blue tie (with silver diagonal striping) for male students. Uniform for female students consists of a black blazer, white blouse, a choice of black trousers or a black pleated skirt. An optional uniform choice is the black unisex jumper.

PE uniform consists of a black t-shirt, a blue jumper and black or navy shorts or tracksuit bottoms.

== Sixth form ==
Sixth form are not obliged to wear uniform, and are allowed to use mobile phones during break and lunchtime.

== Extracurricular activities ==
The academy offers the Duke of Edinburgh Bronze and Silver Award and has partner schools in Germany and Spain, however they had previous partner schools in both France and Japan.

== Incidents ==
On the 25 June 2009 police were called to South Wolds Community School with reports of a student being stabbed during a Design & Technology class. A student was arrested and it was reported that the weapon used was a chisel.

On 23 April 2019 The South Wolds Academy was sent into lockdown for around 40 minutes following a security issue in which a student had threatened another student with some reporting that a student outside the school had been spotted with a knife. Two arrests were made of two boys aged 11 and 14 students were held in school for 20 minutes after the end of the school day, until instructed by the police it was safe to leave. The incident was outside of the South Wolds Academy however all schools in Keyworth were on lockdown, it was reported there were armed officers and police dogs present on the scene.
