= Edmund King (cricketer, born 1906) =

English cricketer

Personal information
- Full name: Edmund Hugh King
- Born: 26 March 1906; Birmingham, Warwickshire, England
- Died: 25 November 1981 (aged 75); Cropthorne, Worcestershire, England
- Batting: Right-handed
- Bowling: Right-arm off break

Domestic team information
- Years: Team
- 1928–1932: Warwickshire

Career statistics
Competition	First-class
Matches	7
Runs scored	84
Batting average	8.40
100s/50s	–/–
Top score	24
Balls bowled	30
Wickets	–
Bowling average	–
5 wickets in innings	–
10 wickets in match	–
Best bowling	–
Catches/stumpings	5/–
- Source: Cricinfo, 13 May 2012

Edmund Hugh King (26 March 1906 – 25 November 1981) was an English cricketer. King was a right-handed batsman who bowled off break. He was born at Birmingham, Warwickshire, and was educated at Ampleforth College.

King made his first-class debut for Warwickshire against Sussex in the 1928 County Championship. He made six further first-class appearances for the county, the last of which came against Glamorgan in the 1932 County Championship. In his total of seven first-class matches, he scored 84 runs at an average of 8.40, with a high score of 24.

King worked as an accountant. He served on Warwickshire's committee from 1936 until his death, and was club chairman from 1962 to 1972. He was chairman of the Test and County Cricket Board's Finance and General Purposes Sub-committee from 1968 until 1980.

He died in a motor accident at Cropthorne, Worcestershire, on 25 November 1981.
