= Melanie Leng =

British geoscientist and researcher

Melanie Leng MBE
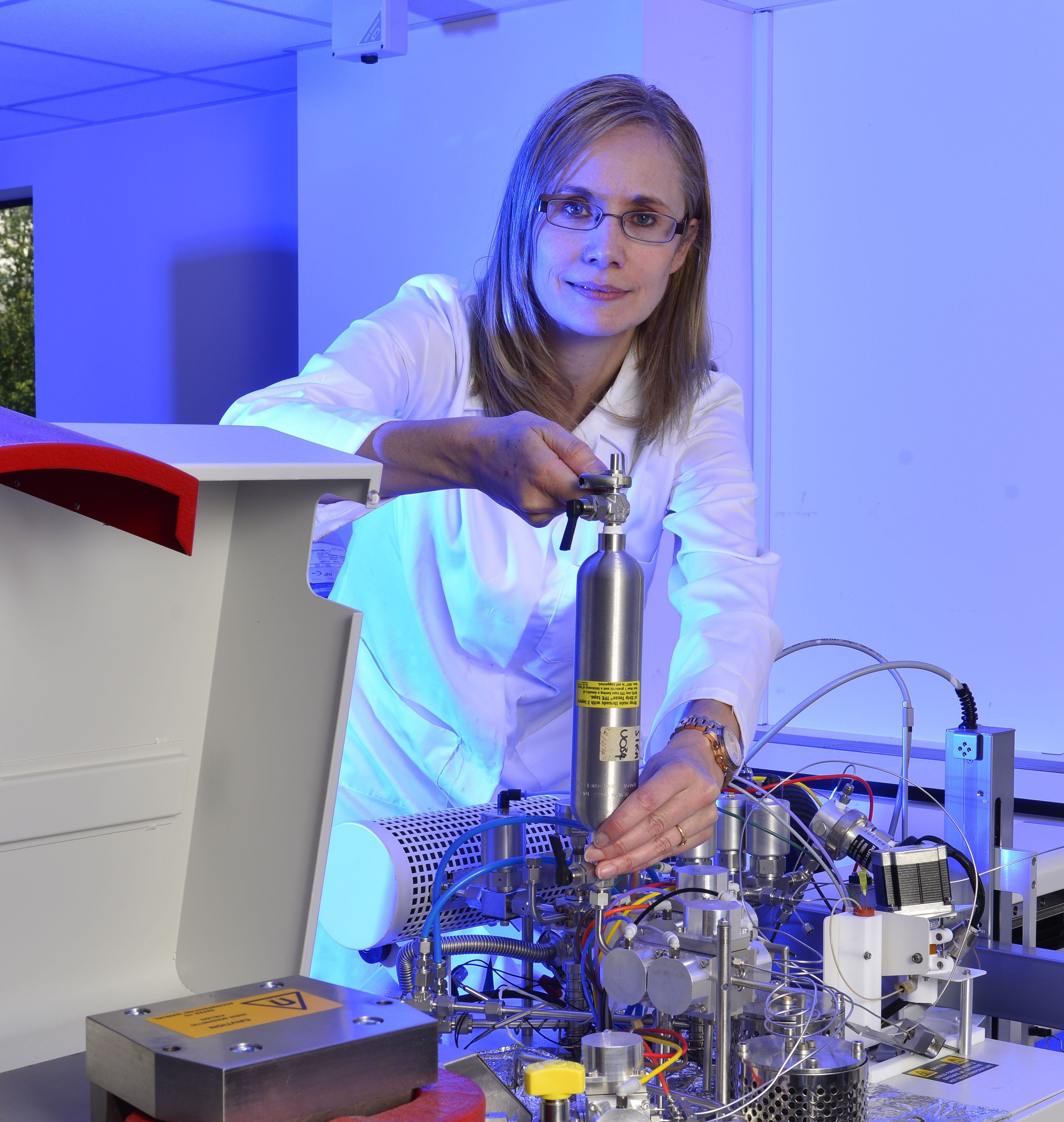
- Melanie Leng
- Born: Melanie Jane Leng; Scarborough, North Yorkshire
- Education: Oxford Polytechnic (BSc); Aberystwyth University (PhD)
- Scientific career
- Fields: Isotopes; Palaeoclimate; Geochemistry
- Workplaces: University of Nottingham; British Geological Survey
- Thesis: Late Ordovician-early Silurian palaeo-environmental analysis in the Tywyn-Corris area of mid-Wales (1990)
- Website: www.nottingham.ac.uk/biosciences/people/melanie.leng

Melanie Jane Leng MBE is a British biochemist. She is a professor of Isotope Geosciences at the University of Nottingham working on isotopes, palaeoclimate and geochemistry. She also serves as the Chief Scientist for Environmental Change Adaptation and Resilience at the British Geological Survey and Director of the Centre for Environmental Geochemistry, a collaboration between the University of Nottingham and the British Geological Survey. For many years (till 2019) she has been the UK convenor and representative of the UK geoscience community on the International Continental Scientific Drilling Program.

== Early life and education ==
Leng grew up in Scarborough, North Yorkshire. She spent her childhood on the cliffs and beaches of the Lower Jurassic. Leng studied geology for GCSE and A Level. At Sixth Form College she took a field trip to Ravenscar and described finding an ammonite which hooked her into geology. She studied for a BSc in Earth Science at Oxford Polytechnic, gained her PhD at Aberystwyth University in 1990, then moved to the British Geological Survey to work in the isotope laboratory.

== Research and career ==
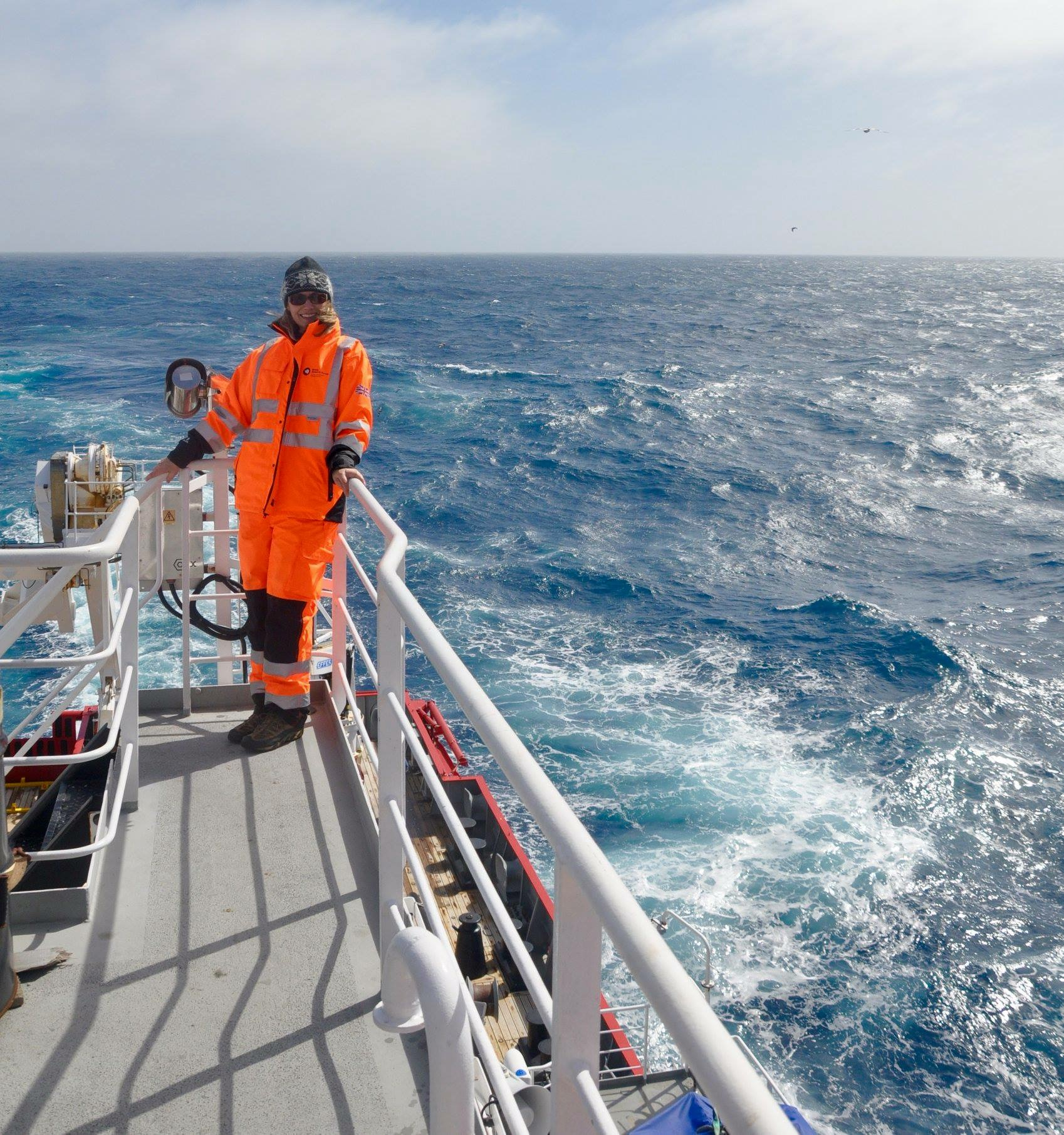
Leng on ORCHESTRA cruise

Leng has several roles, her most current is Chief Scientist for Environmental Change Adaptation and Resilience at the British Geological Survey. She is also Director of the Centre for Environmental Geochemistry, a collaboration between the British Geological Survey and the University of Nottingham, Leng leads research around environmental change, human impact, food security, and resource management. Leng has been involved in deep drilling as part of the International Continental Scientific Drilling Program, and worked in Lake Ohrid in Macedonia and Lake Chala in East Africa. She also heads the Stable Isotope Facility at the British Geological Survey, which is part of the National Environmental Isotope Facility. Stable isotopes can be used to better understand climate change and human-landscape interactions, with increasing importance on the Anthropocene and the modern calibration period; tracers of modern pollution; and understanding the hydrological cycle especially in areas suffering human impact. Leng takes part in expeditions, most recently the Natural Environment Research Council (NERC) mission called Ocean Regulation of Climate by Heat and Carbon Sequestration and Transports (ORCHESTRA). She actively blogs about her research.

Leng serves on the editorial board of the journals Quaternary Research, Quaternary Science Reviews, Scientific Reports and the Journal of Paleolimnology.

She has written several articles about successfully undertaking a PhD.

=== Awards and honours ===
Leng was appointed a Member of the Order of the British Empire (MBE) in the 2019 Birthday Honours.

Leng received an Honorary Doctor of Science (DSc) degree from Oxford Brookes University in 2022.
