= Keyworth =

Village in Nottinghamshire, England

Coordinates: 52.872°N 1.090°W

- Village and civil parish
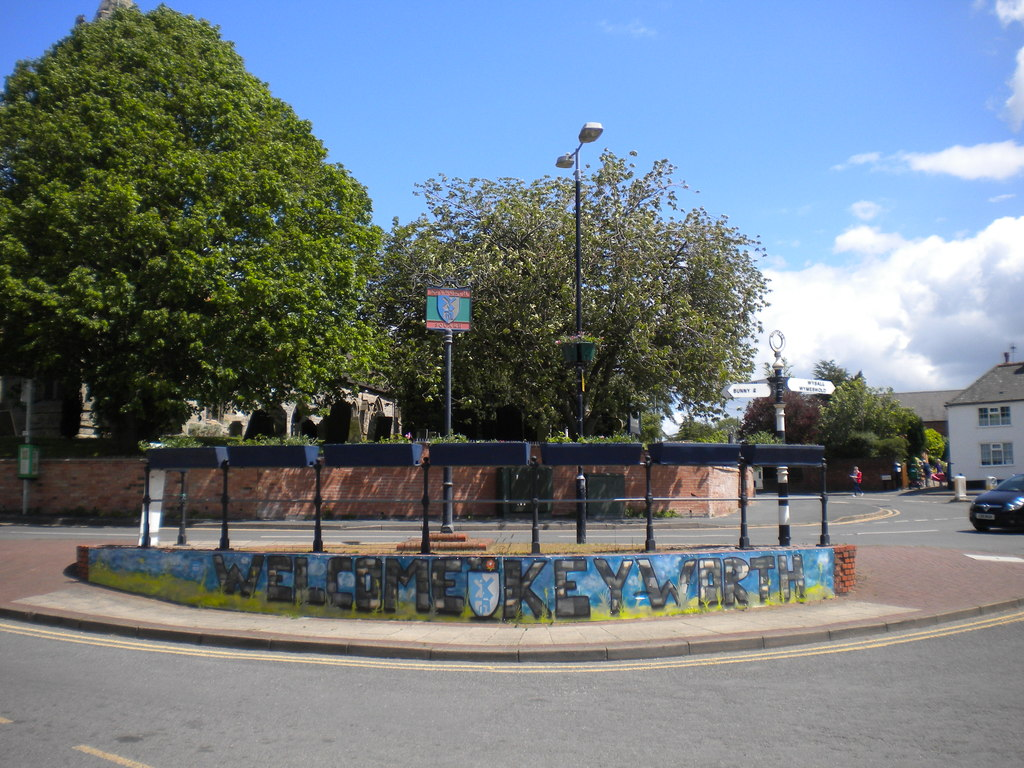
- The Square, Keyworth

- Location within Nottinghamshire
- Interactive map of Keyworth
- Area: 2.92 sq mi (7.6 km^{2})
- Population: 7,390 (2023)
  - Density: 2,531/sq mi (977/km^{2})
- OS grid reference: SK 61244 30926
  - London: 100 mi (160 km) SSE
- District: Borough of Rushcliffe
- Shire county: Nottinghamshire
- Region: East Midlands
- Country: England
- Sovereign state: United Kingdom
- Settlements: Keyworth; Plumtree Park
- Post town: NOTTINGHAM
- Postcode district: NG12
- Dialling code: 0115
- Police: Nottinghamshire
- Fire: Nottinghamshire
- Ambulance: East Midlands
- UK Parliament: Rushcliffe
- Website: www.keyworthparishcouncil.org

Keyworth (/ˈkiːwərθ/) is a village and civil parish of Nottinghamshire, England. It is located about 6 miles (10 km) southeast of the centre of Nottingham. It sits on a small, broad hilltop about 200 feet above sea level which is set in the wider undulating boulder clay that characterises the area south of Nottingham.

The village logo is a local windmill which was demolished in the 1950s. The former site of the windmill was on Selby Lane.

Keyworth is twinned with the French town of Feignies.

== Demographics ==
A 2001 census which was conducted indicates that the civil parish had a population of 6,920, reducing to 6,733 at the 2011 census, with an increase at the 2021 census to 6,821. The population estimate as of 2023 is 7,390 residents.

The average age in Keyworth was found to be between 50–64 years, with 21.19% of people in this category from the 2021 Census.

== History and development ==
Keyworth is first mentioned in writing in the Domesday Book dated 1086, though recent archaeological finds have discovered Roman artefacts in the parish outskirts suggesting human inhabitation of the area as far back as 800 AD. Keyworth originally developed as an agricultural community with the great majority of its inhabitants being farmers and field labourers. Later, frame-knitting gave rise to local employment and expansion in the 1880s.

Listed buildings in the village includes two grade II barns dating from the 17th century, one late 18th century house built in the Regency style, two early 19th century cottages on Main Street, and two grade II Former framework knitters' workshops.

In the early 20th century the Midland Railway came through Plumtree from Nottingham Midland station and along the north east of Keyworth, giving the village an accessible rail route throughout the railway network, though this only lasted about 70 years. The station at Plumtree was open for passengers from 1880 to 1949.

Significant expansion took place throughout the 1950s, 1960s and 1970s with Keyworth effectively becoming a commuter town for Nottingham. As of recent years there have been several new build housing developments being built around the outskirts of Keyworth, the population has now started to rise slightly in recent years.

A fuller account can be found at the website of the Keyworth & District History Society.

== Education and schools ==
The South Wolds Academy & Sixth Form (formerly known as South Wolds Community School) is a Secondary School and Sixth Form with academy status located on Church Drive in Keyworth, Nottingham.

There are also three primary schools in Keyworth (Crossdale Primary School, Keyworth Primary & Nursery School, Willow Brook Primary School).

== Churches ==
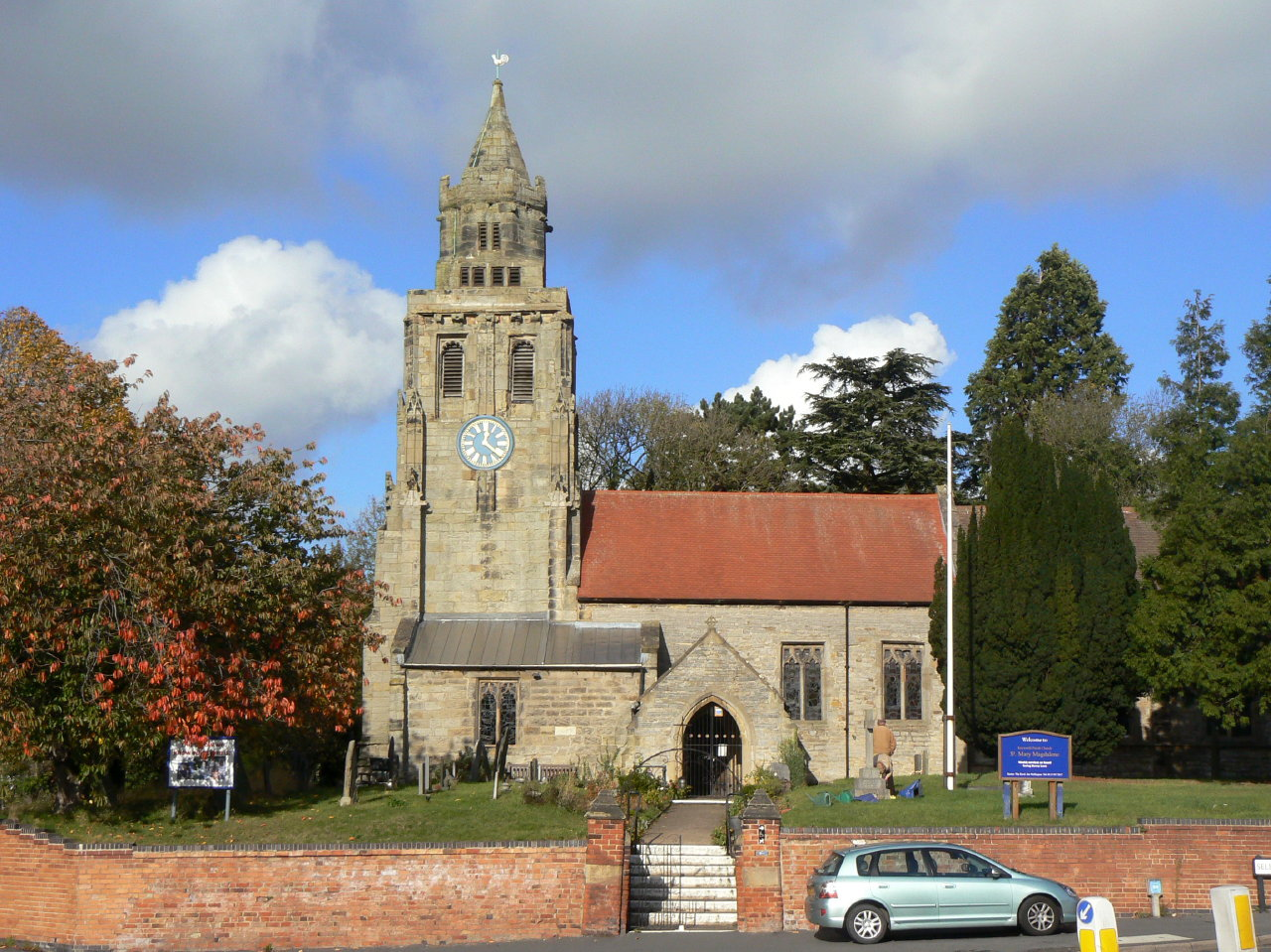
Church of St Mary Magdalene

The Church of St Mary Magdalene dates from the 14th and 15th centuries and is Grade I listed.

A Methodist church, Baptist church, Catholic church, a United Reformed church, and the Rock church (services held at the united Reformed church) are also in the village.

== Recreation ==
The Keyworth Show takes place each summer, on the first Saturday of July which includes a horticultural show, fairground and various displays. This all takes place on the playing fields described below.

The Keyworth Turkey Trot is a half-marathon road race which the 1st Keyworth Scout Group has been holding annually since 1983, normally on the second Sunday in December. It attracts hundreds of runners.

There are several gyms in Keyworth. Keyworth Leisure Centre on Church Drive features a gym, a children's pool and an adult pool (but lacks a sports hall) is located next to the site of the South Wolds Academy. The Key Health Club is a gym on Bunny Lane and Aspire4Fitness is a gym on Debdale Lane within a small Industrial Estate.

The Rectory playing field near the parish church is on the site of an ancient medieval ridge and furrow system. This sometimes made running a rather precarious business for the outfielders of Keyworth Cricket Club who played their home matches on this field until 2012 before moving to the Platt Lane playing fields. In the season 2006 Keyworth Cricket Club players created league records for the most runs in a season and the most centuries in a season. It was the most successful season in the history of the club, which dates back to 1814. An activity park aimed at older children was installed in 2016 on the field and a play park for younger children is across the road in front of Keyworth Primary School.

An additional set of playing fields, the home of Keyworth United Community Football Club of the Nottinghamshire Senior League Premier Division and Keyworth Cricket Club, is on Platt Lane.

There is a skate park on Platt Lane which is made up of concrete ramps on a concrete base.

Stanton-on-the-Wolds Golf Club is situated about a mile from the village centre.

Local groups include scouting, amateur dramatics, bridge, choir, conservation, history, archery, photography, a Martial Arts club (Sanda / Sanshou / Wing Chun), a Karate club established in 1985 (South Notts Shotokan Karate Club SNSKC, a KUGB club) and also a Kickboxing club through KickboxUK which opened in 2013 (Professional Kickboxing Association – Keyworth).

The Keyworth and District Branch of the U3A was established in 2009 and rapidly enrolled over 200 members. By the middle of 2011 it had reached its self-imposed limit of 400 members. It formed more than twenty study and activity groups, such as Play-Reading, Architecture, Family History, French, German, Cycling, Walking, Painting, Book-Reading, Bobbin Lace, Singing for Fun, Ukulele Group, Humour, Wildlife and Bird-Watching.

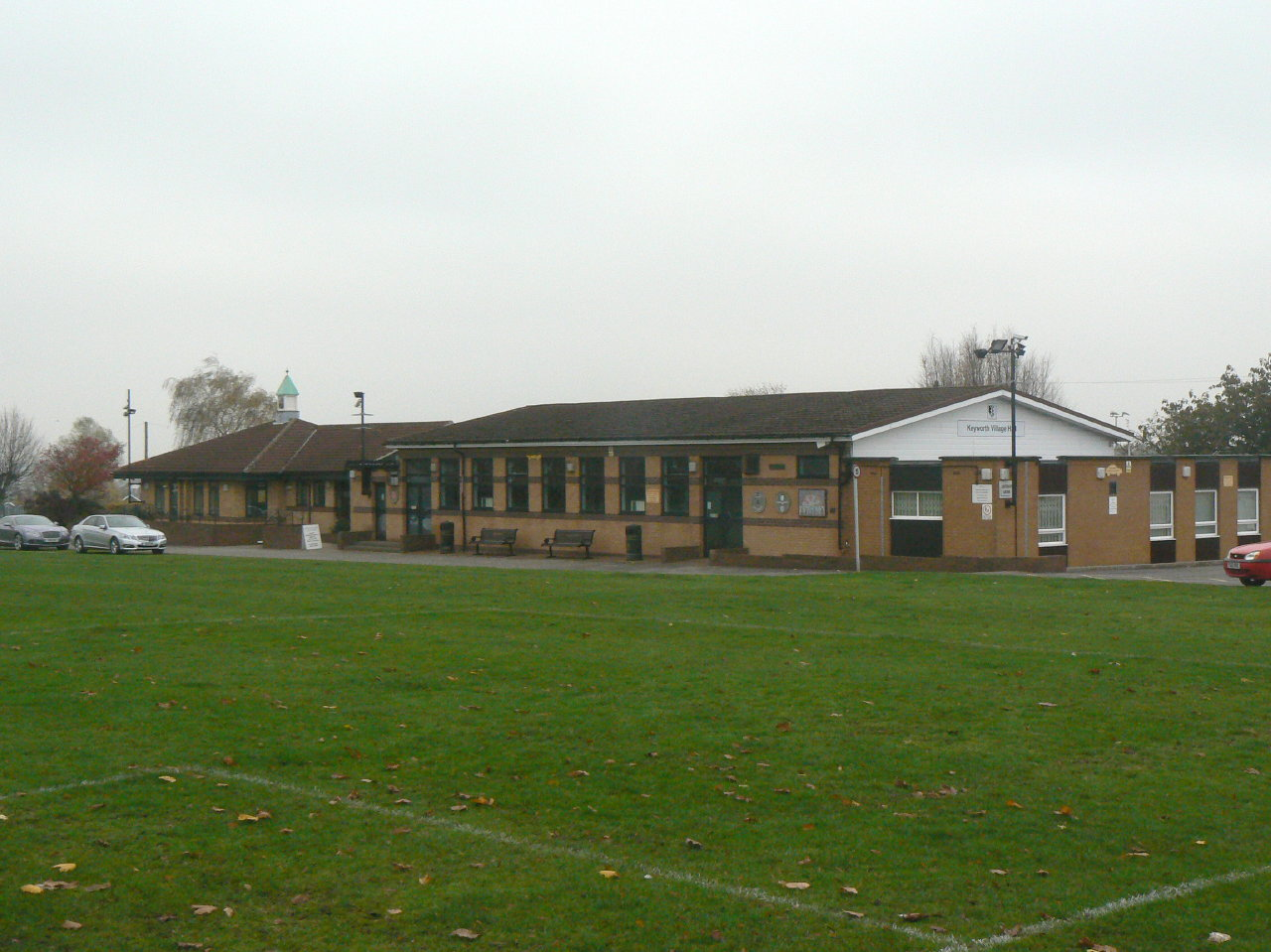
Keyworth Village Hall

The Keyworth Village Quiz was an annual quiz held in the Keyworth Village Hall between teams of four competitors representing local organisations. The quiz, which began in 1976 and ended in 2026, ran for 7 or 8 weeks with teams competing in University Challenge style head-to-head matches.

The Keyworth Charity Allotments was created by the Keyworth Inclosure Award of 1799 as the Poors' Land. Part of the original 4 acre site was sold to build houses on the Fairway housing estate in the early 1960s but the remaining 3 acres (1.2 hectares) provides over 100 plots for Keyworth and Stanton-on-the-Wolds residents to grow their own produce.

Feargus The Musical, a musical based on the political life of Feargus O'Connor, an Irish Chartist leader, was first performed at the South Wolds Academy in November 2018. The musical was written by Keyworth resident Brian Lund and performed by a local cast including dancers from the Keyworth School of Theatre Dance. A second run with the same cast was held at the Nottingham Arts Theatre in November 2019.

== Amenities ==
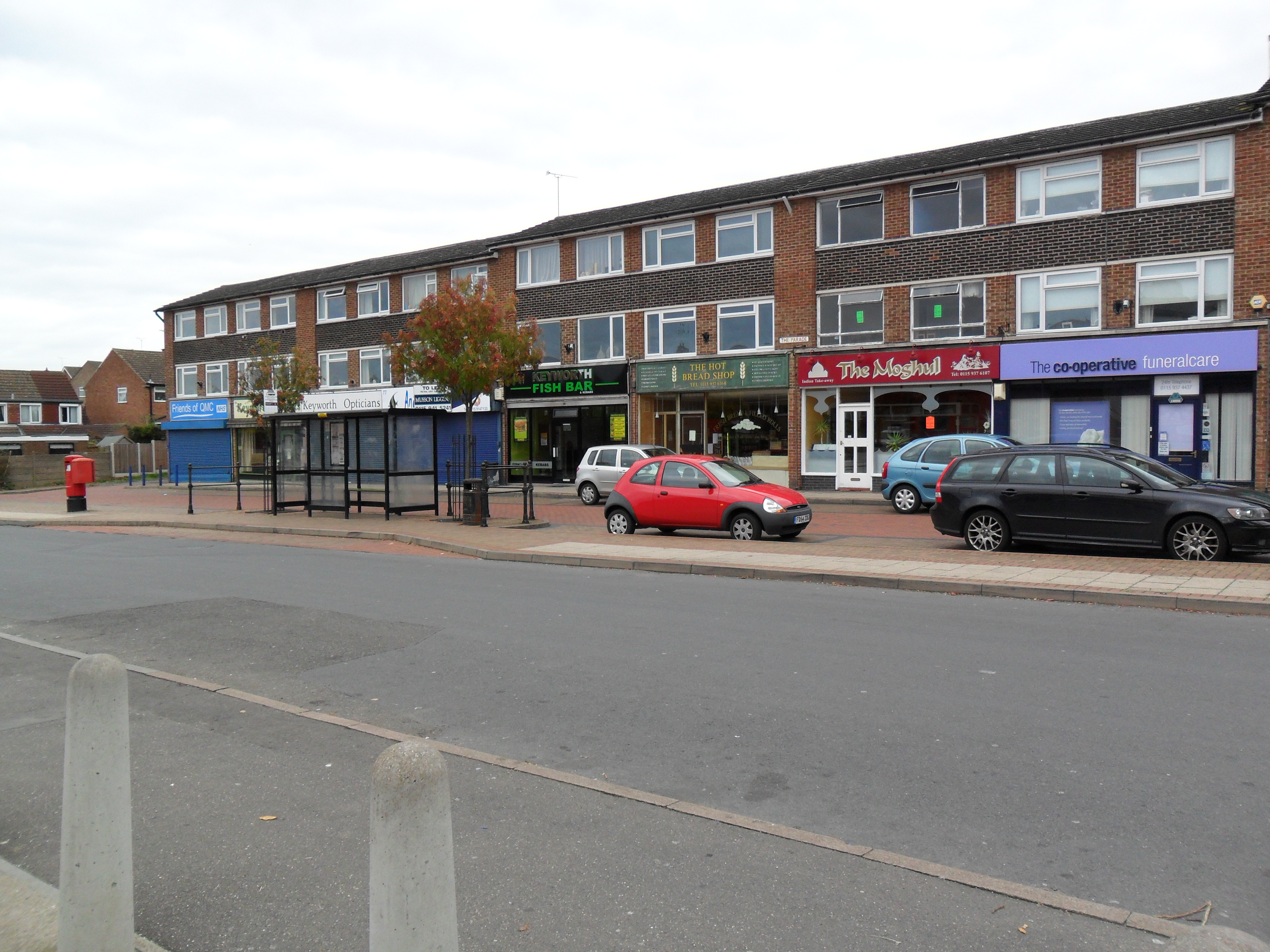
The Parade, Keyworth

The primary healthcare service in Keyworth is a large NHS health centre.

Keyworth is home to the headquarters of the British Geological Survey, located since 1976 on the site of the former Mary Ward Teacher Training College on Nicker Hill in the North-Eastern quadrant of the village. The college opened in 1968 and was a Roman Catholic institution founded by the Loreto Sisters, also known as the Institute of the Blessed Virgin Mary.

The main shopping precincts are in the Square, Main Street and the Parade. There is also a smaller set of shops on Nottingham Road. Keyworth's range of shops includes a post office, pharmacies, small supermarkets, convenience stores, a hardware store, hairdressers, newsagents, butchers, dry-cleaners and florists.

There are no large supermarkets in Keyworth meaning that many residents travel to other local large supermarkets. There are two Co-op Food stores in the village with a small store in The Square and a bigger one opposite The Parade on Wolds Drive.

Keyworth has three public houses, the oldest being The Salutation on Main Street, which was established in the late 17th century around 1675 when it was first recorded as a hostelry. The Salutation has recently undergone a £275k refurbishment. The other two being The Keyworth Tavern on Wolds Drive, and The Windmill (formerly The Pear Tree) located at the bottom of Nottingham Road which has recently been newly refurbished with an investment of £300k.

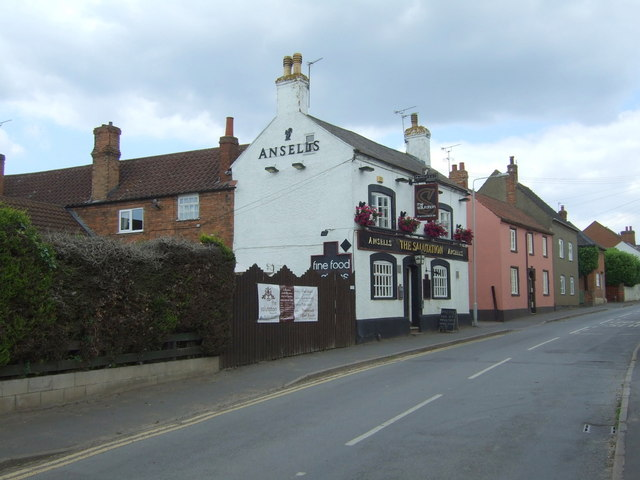
The Salutation, Keyworth

The Keyworth community is served by a long established village magazine, The Keyworth News. This serves as a local resource for the village and hosts a monthly contribution from Keyworth Parish Council.

The Keyworth Abundance Eco Hub located on the Rectory Field is the home of the Abundance group. The group pick fruit from gardens in the surrounding area for those unable to do so themselves. Much of this produce is given away at a weekly stall throughout the summer to autumn season. The Hub is also used for a repair cafe, plant sales, craft workshops, and an annual Apple Day in October.

== Transport ==
The bus company Trentbarton operates "The Keyworth" service from Keyworth to Nottingham via Plumtree, Tollerton, Edwalton and West Bridgford, daily, from early in the morning until around midnight (with additional late-night buses on Fridays and Saturdays).

Keyworth is approximately eight miles from the closest railway station, Nottingham railway station; Keyworth once had its own station (now on the Old Dalby test track) but it was closed in the 1960s. The closest airport, East Midlands Airport is 17 miles to the west of Keyworth.

== Notable residents and former residents ==
Keyworth was the home of Colette Aram who was murdered by Paul Stewart Hutchinson in 1983.

The former Labour MP, Ed Balls, grew up in Keyworth and attended Crossdale Drive Primary School.

Sam Oldham Olympic bronze medallist for Team GB, team gymnastics competitor in the London 2012 Olympic Games. Currently residing in Keyworth.

Professor Melanie Leng MBE, Chief Scientist at the British Geological Survey and Director of the Centre for Environmental Geochemistry. Currently residing in Keyworth.

== See also ==
- Listed buildings in Keyworth
- Church of St Mary Magdalene, Keyworth
- South Wolds Academy
- Keyworth United F.C.
- Keyworth Rugby Club
