= Clipston, Nottinghamshire =

Village and civil parish in Nottinghamshire, England

Coordinates: 52.90060°N 1.05743°W

Clipston
- Hamlet and civil parish
- Location within Nottinghamshire
- Interactive map of Clipston
- Area: 1.43 sq mi (3.7 km^{2})
- Population: 62 (2021)
  - Density: 43/sq mi (17/km^{2})
- OS grid reference: SK 63535 34110
  - London: 105 mi (169 km) SSE
- District: Rushcliffe
- Shire county: Nottinghamshire
- Region: East Midlands
- Country: England
- Sovereign state: United Kingdom
- Post town: NOTTINGHAM
- Postcode district: NG12
- Dialling code: 0115
- Police: Nottinghamshire
- Fire: Nottinghamshire
- Ambulance: East Midlands
- UK Parliament: Rushcliffe

Clipston, or Clipston on the Wolds, is an English hamlet and civil parish in the south Nottinghamshire district of Rushcliffe. It lies between Cotgrave and Normanton-on-the-Wolds and is approached by narrow roads that offer views of neighbouring countryside. It has an area of 916 acres (3.71 km^{2}; 1.431 sq mi) and a population of 62 as reported in the 2021 census.

== Wold view ==
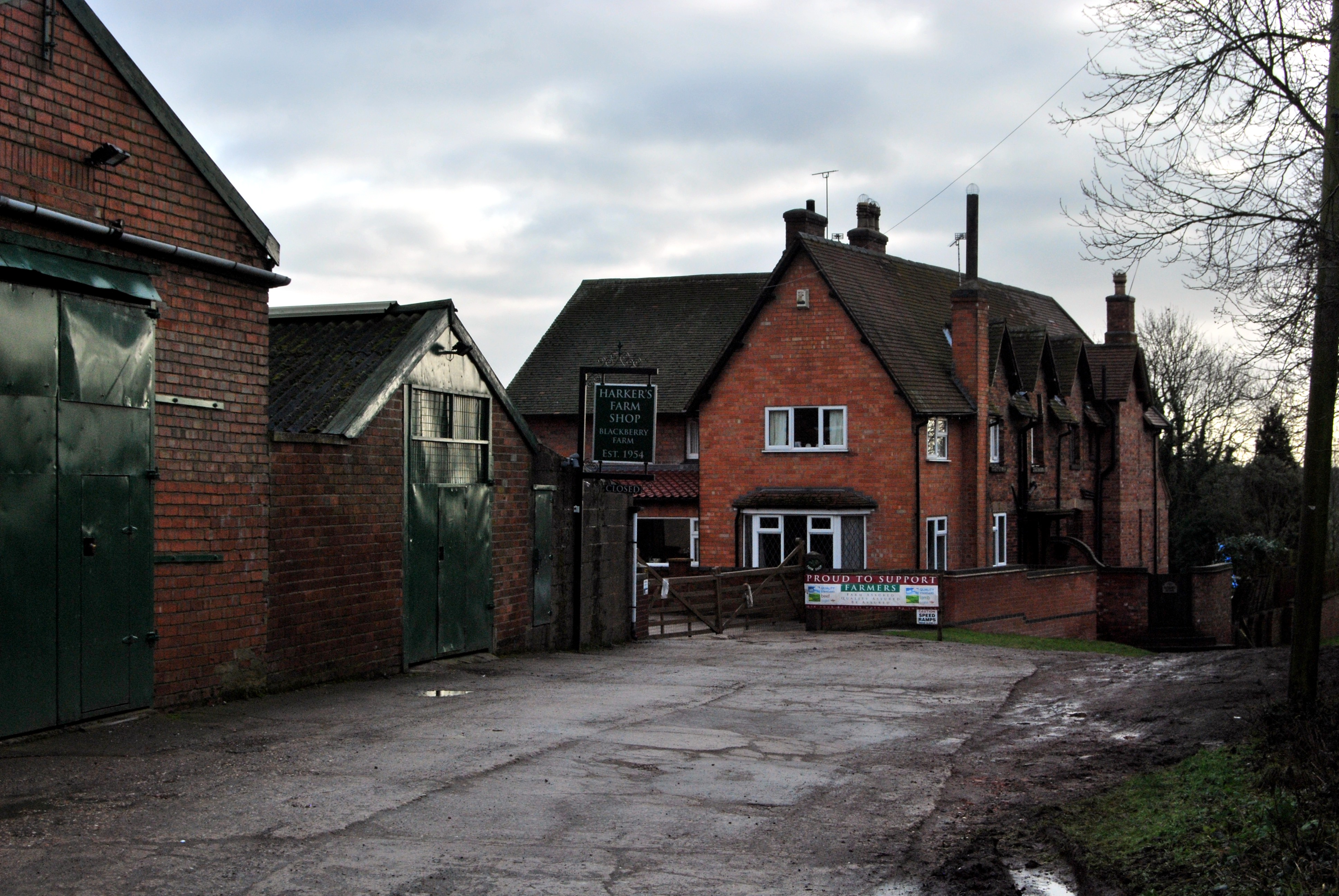
Clipston Blackberry Farm

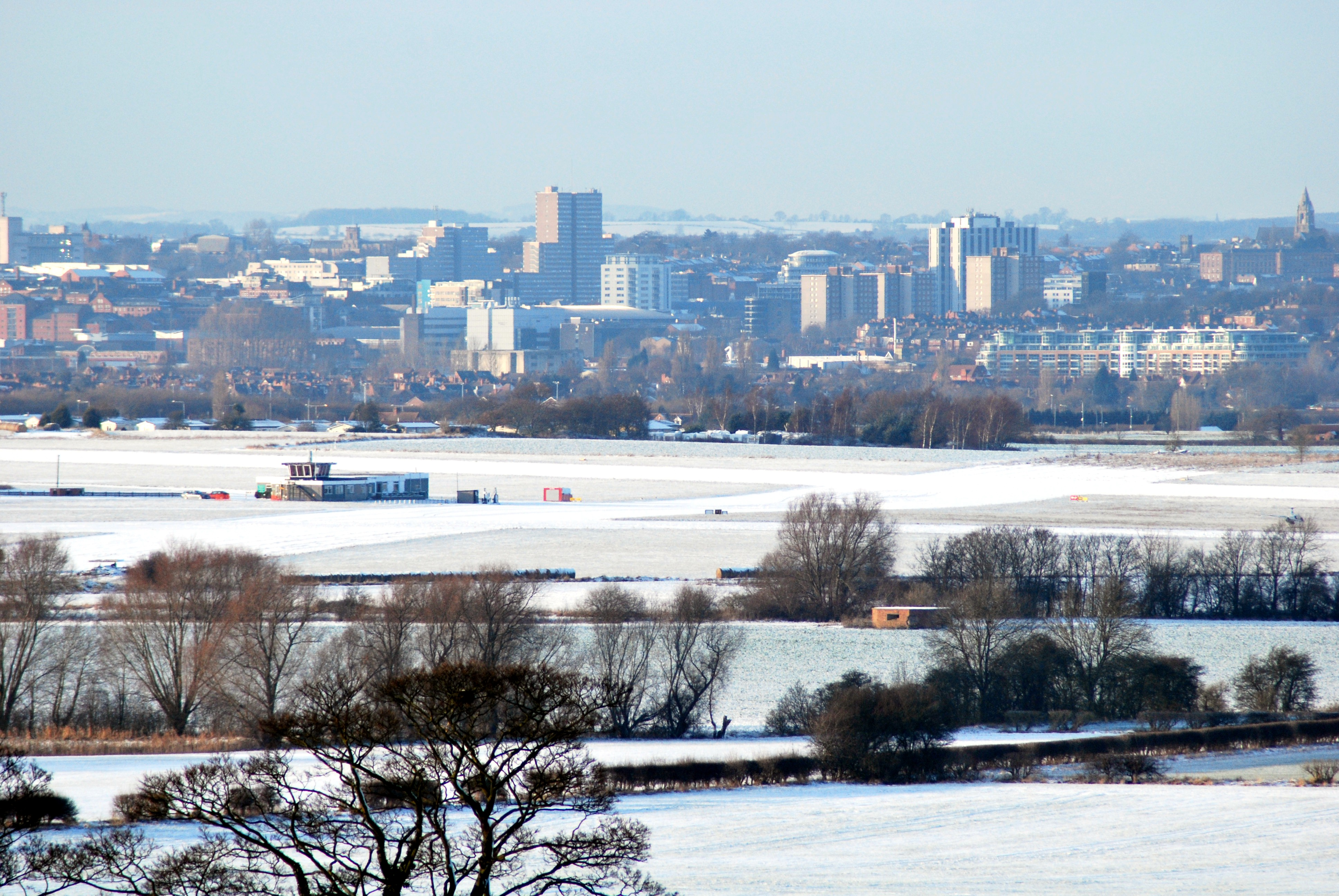
Nottingham as seen from Clipston

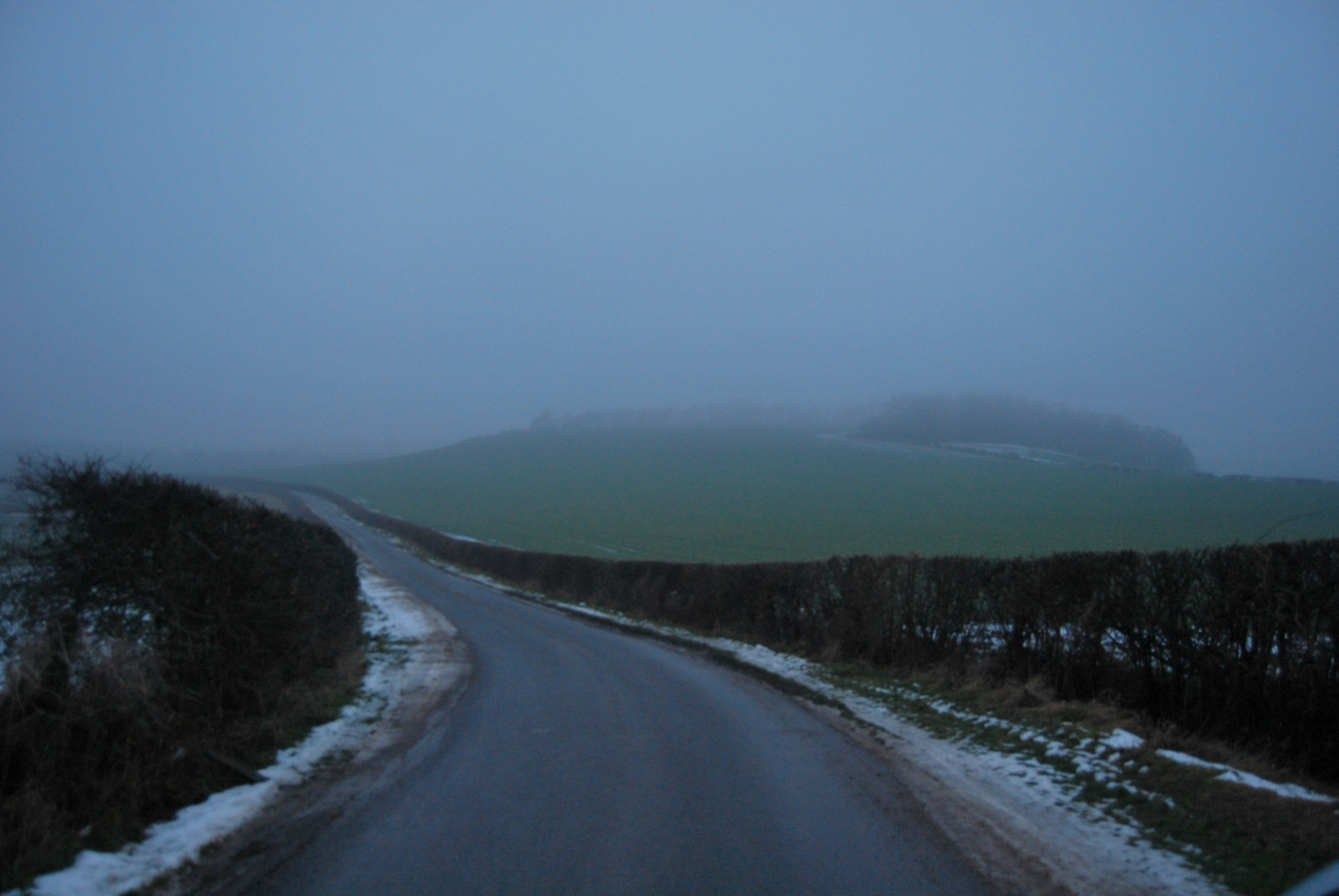
Hoe Hill

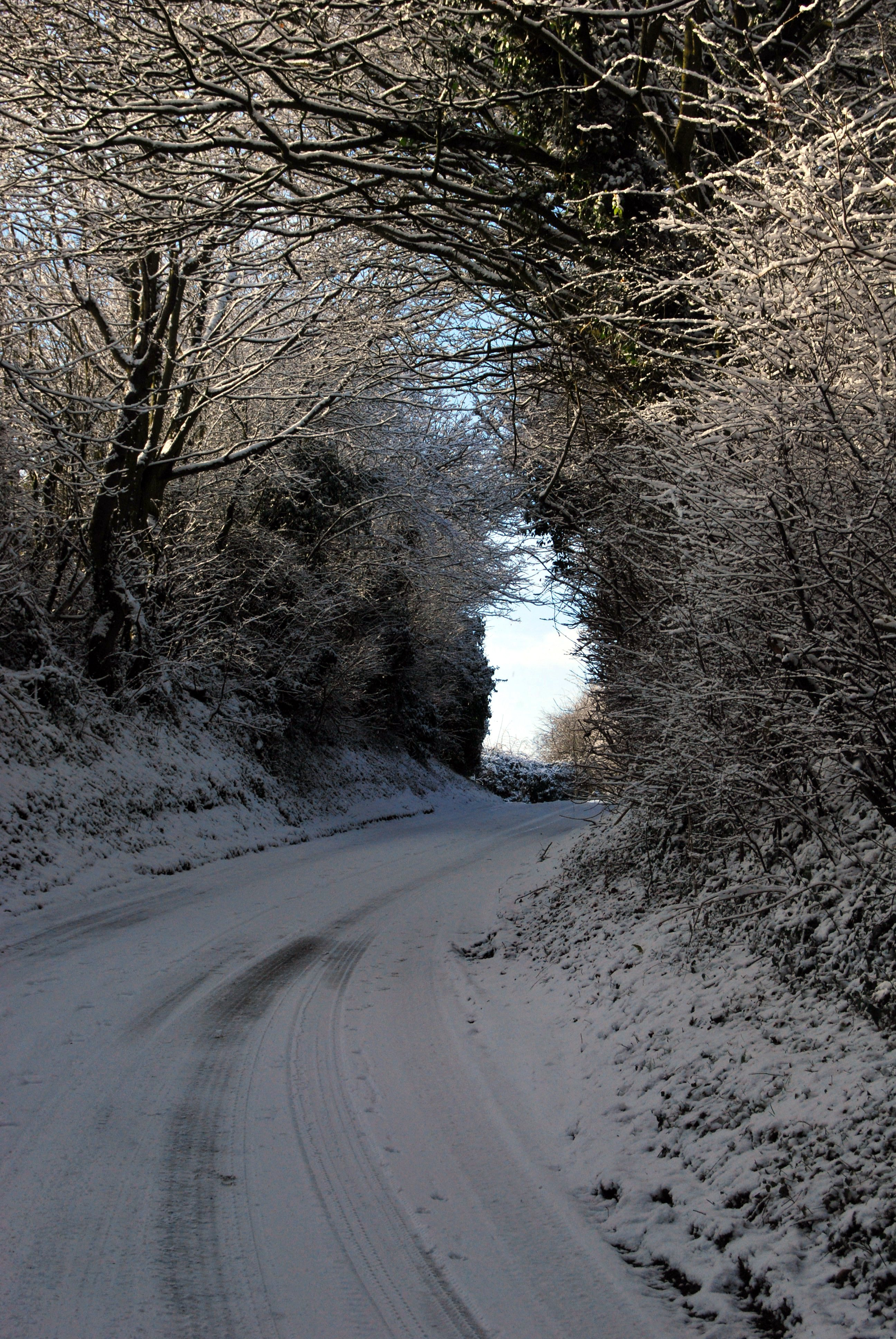
Clipston Lane

Clipston stands on the northernmost edge of the Wolds in Nottinghamshire. The area enjoys, from an elevation of about 79 m/259 ft, panoramic views of the Trent valley and the East and South side of the city of Nottingham, some 50 m/164 ft lower. Nearby to the west is Hoe Hill, with a horseshoe-shaped wood.

== Toponymy ==
The place-name Clipston seems to contain an Old Norse personal name, Klyppr, + tun (Old English), an enclosure; a farmstead; a village; an estate, so "Klyppr's farm or settlement". The English suffix "–tun", like "-by", was usually preceded by a Danish personal name. "Klypper's farm", v. Tun appears in The Place Names of Northamptonshire (1933). The name of the nearby "Normanton" means Norseman village, implying there were only a few Norsemen amongst the settlers. However, there may well have been an Anglo-Saxon settlement at Clipston, subsequently allocated to a Dane of the Scandinavian army that colonised Nottinghamshire in the 9th century.

== Early mentions ==
Cliston' 1198 (Pipe Rolls, Record Commission), Clipstun' 1235, (Book of Fees, 1922–31 ), Clipeston 1287 (Assize Rolls), Clippeston 1325 (Calendar of Patent Rolls), Clipeston juxta Plumtre, Clibston juxta Plumtre 1278 (Assize Rolls ), Clipston juxta Plumtre 1315 (Feets of Fines 1196–1760), Clipston super le Hill 1327 (Nottinghamshire Subsidies 1895), Clipston super le Hull 1332 (Nottinghamshire Subsidies 1895), Clipston othe hill justa Plumptre 1400 (Feets of Fines 1196–1760) and Clipston super montem 1516 (Recovery Rolls).

== History ==
Though there is little place-name evidence in the area before the 9th century, there have been ill-recorded discoveries of burial mounds near the Fosse Way, not far from Cotgrave. The area to each side of the Trent was settled by Angles as they made their way up the river to the heartlands and the hills that form the edge of the Wolds. It would have appeared defensible, but difficult to farm. At the time, the wide Trent valley was mainly Triassic clay and probably covered heavily in vegetation, whilst the Wolds are of Boulder clay, making them difficult to manage and drain. Nevertheless, there is a recorded settlement in the late 12th century, and nearby Plumtree and Normanton, like Clipston, are mentioned in the Domesday Book.

== Present day ==
Clipston is truly a rural village, with no amenities other than a post box. Farms in and around the village include Glebe Farm, Old Hall Farm, Manor Farm, Blackberry Farm and Wolds Farm towards Plumtree. Blackberry Farm houses Harker's Farm Shop and produces quality beef and lamb and other produce for sale. There is also a viewing area for children to meet lambs, goats, Highland Cattle calves, guinea pigs, rabbits, etc. From here there are signed walks to and through the large tree plantations to the south and across the Wolds.

Other buildings in the village are private dwellings, with some local barns recently converted for residential use. There is no church, the parish church being St Mary's, parish church of Plumtree, a mile to the west. An informative history of St Mary's tells of a "tin tabernacle" dedicated to St John, erected in Clipston as a "chapel of ease" around 1898. This was removed in 1942. The site may have been used in the Second World War. The road "Church Gate" in the village dates not from the 19th century, however, as it appears in documents in the possession of Earl Manvers at Thoresby House, written around 1585. The Manvers family were the local landowners, as noted on the Cotgrave page. Church Gate, however, does eventually lead though Normanton on the Wolds to the Church of St Mary's in Plumtree.

== Public transport ==
Clipston has no public transport. The nearest buses serve Plumtree and Normanton. The nearest railway station is at Radcliffe (4.9 miles/7.9 km) on the line between Nottingham and Grantham or Skegness.
