= Listed buildings in Nottinghamshire =

There are a number of listed buildings in Nottinghamshire. The term "listed building", in the United Kingdom, refers to a building or structure designated as being of special architectural, historical, or cultural significance. Details of all the listed buildings are contained in the National Heritage List for England. They are categorised in three grades: Grade I consists of buildings of outstanding architectural or historical interest, Grade II* includes significant buildings of more than local interest and Grade II consists of buildings of special architectural or historical interest. Buildings in England are listed by the Secretary of State for Culture, Media and Sport on recommendations provided by English Heritage, which also determines the grading.

Some listed buildings are looked after by the National Trust or English Heritage while others are in private ownership or administered by trusts.

== Listed buildings by grade ==
- Grade I listed buildings in Nottinghamshire
- Grade II* listed buildings in Nottinghamshire

== Listed buildings by civil parish or unparished area ==
=== Ashfield ===
- Listed buildings in Annesley
- Listed buildings in Felley
- Listed buildings in Hucknall
- Listed buildings in Kirkby-in-Ashfield
- Listed buildings in Selston
- Listed buildings in Skegby
- Listed buildings in Sutton-in-Ashfield
- Listed buildings in Teversal

=== Bassetlaw ===
- Listed buildings in Askham, Nottinghamshire
- Listed buildings in Babworth
- Listed buildings in Barnby Moor
- Listed buildings in Beckingham, Nottinghamshire
- Listed buildings in Blyth, Nottinghamshire
- Listed buildings in Bole, Nottinghamshire
- Listed buildings in Bothamsall
- Listed buildings in Carburton
- Listed buildings in Carlton in Lindrick
- Listed buildings in Clarborough and Welham
- Listed buildings in Clayworth
- Listed buildings in Clumber and Hardwick
- Listed buildings in Cottam, Nottinghamshire
- Listed buildings in Darlton
- Listed buildings in Dunham-on-Trent
- Listed buildings in East Drayton
- Listed buildings in East Markham
- Listed buildings in Eaton, Nottinghamshire
- Listed buildings in Elkesley
- Listed buildings in Everton, Nottinghamshire
- Listed buildings in Fledborough
- Listed buildings in Gamston, Bassetlaw
- Listed buildings in Gringley on the Hill
- Listed buildings in Grove, Nottinghamshire
- Listed buildings in Harworth Bircotes
- Listed buildings in Haughton, Nottinghamshire
- Listed buildings in Hayton, Nottinghamshire
- Listed buildings in Headon cum Upton
- Listed buildings in Hodsock
- Listed buildings in Laneham
- Listed buildings in Lound, Nottinghamshire
- Listed buildings in Marnham, Nottinghamshire
- Listed buildings in Mattersey
- Listed buildings in Misson, Nottinghamshire
- Listed buildings in Misterton, Nottinghamshire
- Listed buildings in Nether Langwith
- Listed buildings in Normanton on Trent
- Listed buildings in North Leverton with Habblesthorpe
- Listed buildings in North and South Wheatley
- Listed buildings in Norton, Cuckney, Holbeck and Welbeck
- Listed buildings in Ordsall, Nottinghamshire
- Listed buildings in Ragnall
- Listed buildings in Rampton and Woodbeck, Nottinghamshire
- Listed buildings in Ranskill
- Listed buildings in Retford
- Listed buildings in Saundby
- Listed buildings in Scaftworth
- Listed buildings in Scrooby
- Listed buildings in Shireoaks
- Listed buildings in South Leverton
- Listed buildings in Stokeham
- Listed buildings in Sturton le Steeple
- Listed buildings in Styrrup with Oldcotes
- Listed buildings in Sutton cum Lound
- Listed buildings in Torworth
- Listed buildings in Treswell
- Listed buildings in Tuxford
- Listed buildings in Walkeringham
- Listed buildings in Wallingwells
- Listed buildings in Worksop
- Listed buildings in West Drayton, Nottinghamshire
- Listed buildings in West Markham
- Listed buildings in West Stockwith
- Listed buildings in Wiseton

=== Broxtowe ===
- Listed buildings in Attenborough and Chilwell
- Listed buildings in Awsworth
- Listed buildings in Beeston, Nottinghamshire
- Listed buildings in Bramcote
- Listed buildings in Brinsley
- Listed buildings in Cossall
- Listed buildings in Eastwood, Nottinghamshire
- Listed buildings in Greasley
- Listed buildings in Kimberley, Nottinghamshire
- Listed buildings in Nuthall
- Listed buildings in Stapleford, Nottinghamshire
- Listed buildings in Strelley Village
- Listed buildings in Trowell

=== City of Nottingham ===
- Listed buildings in Nottingham (Aspley ward)
- Listed buildings in Nottingham (Basford ward)
- Listed buildings in Nottingham (Berridge ward)
- Listed buildings in Nottingham (Bilborough ward)
- Listed buildings in Nottingham (Bridge ward)
- Listed buildings in Nottingham (Bulwell ward)
- Listed buildings in Nottingham (Bulwell Forest ward)
- Listed buildings in Nottingham (Clifton North ward)
- Listed buildings in Nottingham (Clifton South ward)
- Listed buildings in Nottingham (Dale ward)
- Listed buildings in Nottingham (Dunkirk and Lenton ward)
- Listed buildings in Nottingham (Hyson Green and Arboretum ward)
- Listed buildings in Nottingham (Mapperley ward)
- Listed buildings in Nottingham (Porchester ward)
- Listed buildings in Nottingham (Radford and Park ward)
- Listed buildings in Nottingham (Sherwood ward)
- Listed buildings in Nottingham (St Ann's ward)
- Listed buildings in Nottingham (Wollaton East and Lenton Abbey ward)
- Listed buildings in Nottingham (Wollaton West ward)

=== Gedling ===
- Listed buildings in Burton Joyce
- Listed buildings in Calverton, Nottinghamshire
- Listed buildings in Gedling (unparished areas)
- Listed buildings in Lambley, Nottinghamshire
- Listed buildings in Linby
- Listed buildings in Newstead, Nottinghamshire
- Listed buildings in Papplewick
- Listed buildings in Ravenshead
- Listed buildings in Stoke Bardolph
- Listed buildings in Woodborough, Nottinghamshire

=== Mansfield ===
- Listed buildings in Mansfield (inner area)
- Listed buildings in Mansfield (outer areas)
- Listed buildings in Warsop

=== Newark and Sherwood ===
- Listed buildings in Averham
- Listed buildings in Balderton
- Listed buildings in Barnby in the Willows
- Listed buildings in Bathley
- Listed buildings in Besthorpe, Nottinghamshire
- Listed buildings in Bestwood St. Albans
- Listed buildings in Bilsthorpe
- Listed buildings in Bleasby, Nottinghamshire
- Listed buildings in Blidworth
- Listed buildings in Bulcote
- Listed buildings in Carlton-on-Trent
- Listed buildings in Caunton
- Listed buildings in Caythorpe, Nottinghamshire
- Listed buildings in Coddington, Nottinghamshire
- Listed buildings in Collingham, Nottinghamshire
- Listed buildings in Cotham, Nottinghamshire
- Listed buildings in Cromwell, Nottinghamshire
- Listed buildings in Eakring
- Listed buildings in East Stoke, Nottinghamshire
- Listed buildings in Edingley
- Listed buildings in Edwinstowe
- Listed buildings in Egmanton
- Listed buildings in Elston
- Listed buildings in Epperstone
- Listed buildings in Farndon, Nottinghamshire
- Listed buildings in Farnsfield
- Listed buildings in Fiskerton cum Morton
- Listed buildings in Girton, Nottinghamshire
- Listed buildings in Gonalston
- Listed buildings in Grassthorpe
- Listed buildings in Halam, Nottinghamshire
- Listed buildings in Halloughton
- Listed buildings in Harby, Nottinghamshire
- Listed buildings in Hawton
- Listed buildings in Hockerton
- Listed buildings in Holme, Nottinghamshire
- Listed buildings in Hoveringham
- Listed buildings in Kelham
- Listed buildings in Kilvington
- Listed buildings in Kirklington, Nottinghamshire
- Listed buildings in Kirton, Nottinghamshire
- Listed buildings in Kneesall
- Listed buildings in Langford, Nottinghamshire
- Listed buildings in Laxton and Moorhouse
- Listed buildings in Lowdham
- Listed buildings in Maplebeck
- Listed buildings in Newark-on-Trent
- Listed buildings in North Clifton
- Listed buildings in North Muskham
- Listed buildings in Norwell, Nottinghamshire
- Listed buildings in Ollerton and Boughton
- Listed buildings in Ossington
- Listed buildings in Oxton, Nottinghamshire
- Listed buildings in Perlethorpe cum Budby
- Listed buildings in Rolleston, Nottinghamshire
- Listed buildings in Rufford, Nottinghamshire
- Listed buildings in South Clifton
- Listed buildings in South Muskham
- Listed buildings in South Scarle
- Listed buildings in Southwell, Nottinghamshire
- Listed buildings in Staunton, Nottinghamshire
- Listed buildings in Sutton-on-Trent
- Listed buildings in Syerston
- Listed buildings in Thorney, Nottinghamshire
- Listed buildings in Thorpe, Nottinghamshire
- Listed buildings in Thurgarton
- Listed buildings in Upton, Newark and Sherwood
- Listed buildings in Wellow, Nottinghamshire
- Listed buildings in Weston, Nottinghamshire
- Listed buildings in Winkburn
- Listed buildings in Winthorpe, Nottinghamshire

=== Rushcliffe ===
- Listed buildings in Aslockton
- Listed buildings in Barton in Fabis
- Listed buildings in Bingham, Nottinghamshire
- Listed buildings in Bradmore, Nottinghamshire
- Listed buildings in Bunny, Nottinghamshire
- Listed buildings in Car Colston
- Listed buildings in Colston Bassett
- Listed buildings in Costock
- Listed buildings in Cotgrave
- Listed buildings in Cropwell Bishop
- Listed buildings in Cropwell Butler
- Listed buildings in East Bridgford
- Listed buildings in East Leake
- Listed buildings in Elton on the Hill
- Listed buildings in Flawborough
- Listed buildings in Flintham
- Listed buildings in Gotham, Nottinghamshire
- Listed buildings in Granby, Nottinghamshire
- Listed buildings in Hawksworth, Nottinghamshire
- Listed buildings in Hickling, Nottinghamshire
- Listed buildings in Holme Pierrepont
- Listed buildings in Keyworth
- Listed buildings in Kingston on Soar
- Listed buildings in Kinoulton
- Listed buildings in Kneeton
- Listed buildings in Langar cum Barnstone
- Listed buildings in Newton, Nottinghamshire
- Listed buildings in Normanton on Soar
- Listed buildings in Normanton-on-the-Wolds
- Listed buildings in Orston
- Listed buildings in Owthorpe
- Listed buildings in Plumtree, Nottinghamshire
- Listed buildings in Radcliffe-on-Trent
- Listed buildings in Ratcliffe-on-Soar
- Listed buildings in Rempstone
- Listed buildings in Ruddington
- Listed buildings in Scarrington
- Listed buildings in Screveton
- Listed buildings in Shelford, Nottinghamshire
- Listed buildings in Sibthorpe
- Listed buildings in Stanford on Soar
- Listed buildings in Stanton-on-the-Wolds
- Listed buildings in Sutton Bonington
- Listed buildings in Thoroton
- Listed buildings in Thorpe in the Glebe
- Listed buildings in Thrumpton
- Listed buildings in Tithby
- Listed buildings in Tollerton, Nottinghamshire
- Listed buildings in Upper Broughton
- Listed buildings in West Bridgford
- Listed buildings in West Leake
- Listed buildings in Whatton-in-the-Vale
- Listed buildings in Widmerpool
- Listed buildings in Willoughby on the Wolds
- Listed buildings in Wiverton Hall
- Listed buildings in Wysall
