= Bathley =

Village and civil parish in Nottinghamshire, England

Coordinates: 53.12°N 0.84°W

- Village and civil parish
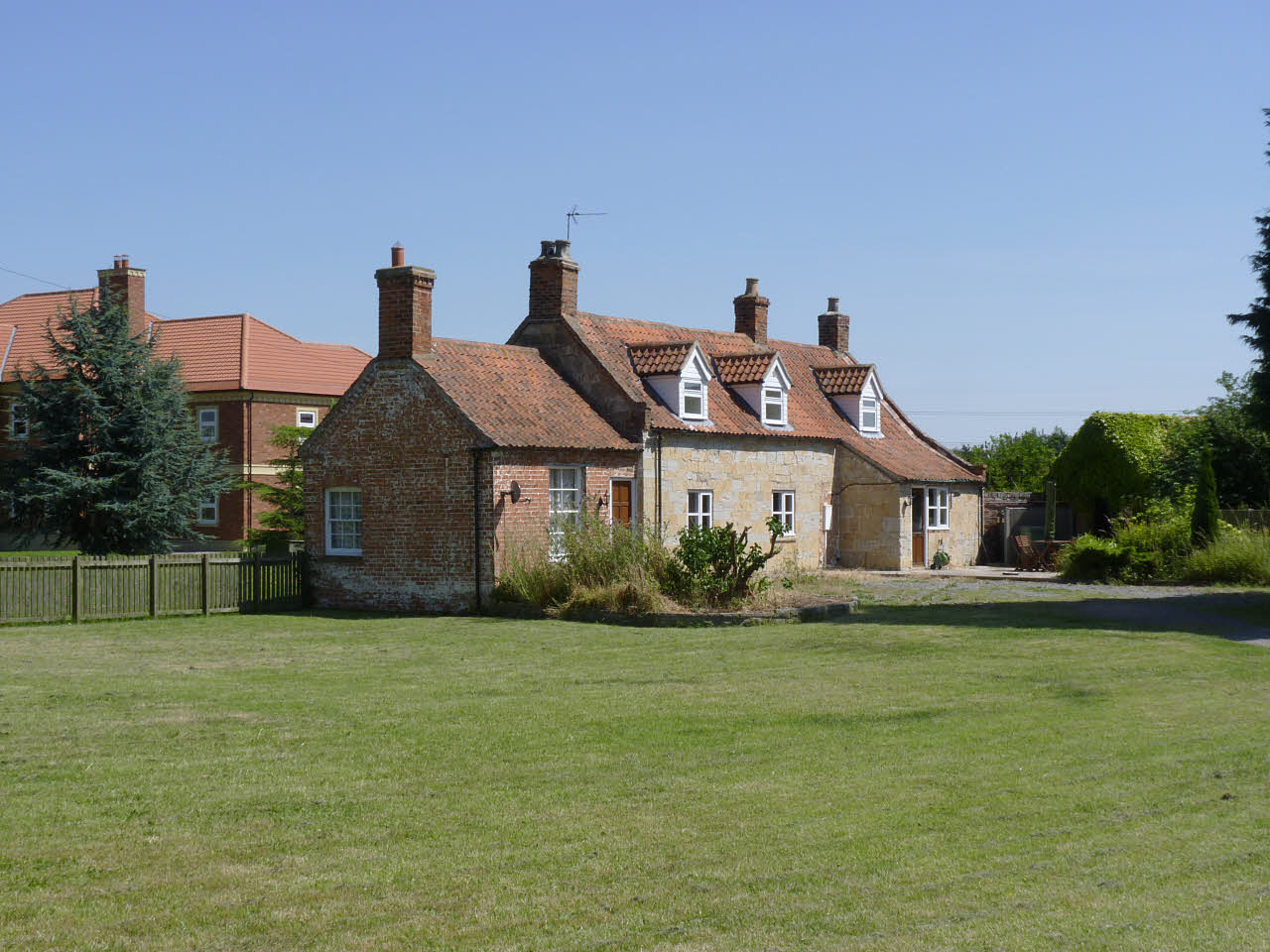
- Grange Farm House

- Location within Nottinghamshire
- Interactive map of Bathley
- Area: 2.31 sq mi (6.0 km^{2})
- Population: 247 (2021)
  - Density: 107/sq mi (41/km^{2})
- OS grid reference: SK 7759
  - London: 115 mi (185 km) SSE
- District: Newark and Sherwood
- Shire county: Nottinghamshire
- Region: East Midlands
- Country: England
- Sovereign state: United Kingdom
- Post town: NOTTINGHAM
- Postcode district: NG23
- Dialling code: 01636
- Police: Nottinghamshire
- Fire: Nottinghamshire
- Ambulance: East Midlands
- UK Parliament: Newark

Bathley is a village and civil parish in the Newark and Sherwood district of Nottinghamshire, England, north-west of Newark-on-Trent. According to the 2011 census it had a population of 246, this increased marginally to 247 in the 2021 census. Bathley is recorded in the Domesday Book as Badeleie.

As Bathley does not have a hall of any kind, the Crown Inn public house is used for family parties, christenings and funerals as well as parish council meetings.

The village is also unusual in the fact that it doesn't have a parish church.

== See also ==
- Listed buildings in Bathley
