= Newton, Nottinghamshire =

Village and civil parish in Nottinghamshire, England

Coordinates: 52.97°N 0.98°W

Newton
- Village and civil parish
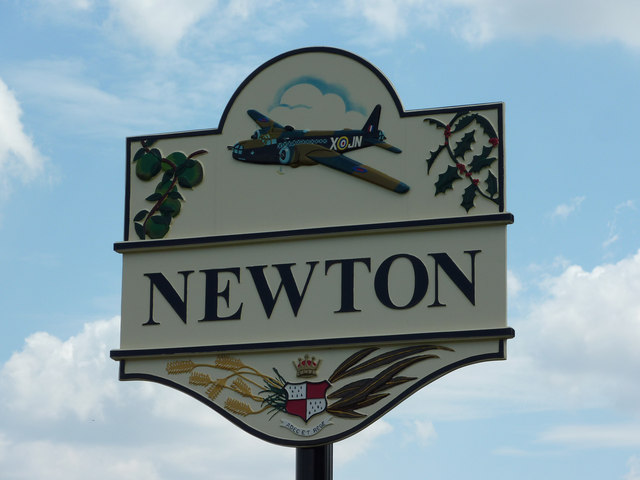
- Village road sign referring to its former air base

- Location within Nottinghamshire
- Interactive map of Newton
- Area: 1.9 sq mi (4.9 km^{2})
- Population: 841 (2021)
  - Density: 443/sq mi (171/km^{2})
- OS grid reference: SK 686419
  - London: 105 mi (169 km) SSE
- District: Rushcliffe
- Shire county: Nottinghamshire
- Region: East Midlands
- Country: England
- Sovereign state: United Kingdom
- Post town: NOTTINGHAM
- Postcode district: NG13
- Dialling code: 01949
- Police: Nottinghamshire
- Fire: Nottinghamshire
- Ambulance: East Midlands
- UK Parliament: Rushcliffe
- Website: www.newton-pc-notts.co.uk

Newton is a village and civil parish in the Rushcliffe district, in the county of Nottinghamshire, England. It is located 1 mile (1.6 km) south-west of East Bridgford and about 1 mile (1.6 km) south-east of the River Trent, close to the junction of the A46 Fosse Way and the A6079. It had 841 residents at the 2021 census.

RAF Newton is a disused airfield immediately to the south of Main Street. It opened in July 1940 and closed in 2000. The hangars and other buildings are now used by a number of businesses within the Newton Commercial Centre.

Newton Mill was a wooden post mill built before 1855. It ceased work c. 1920 and the buck was dismantled c. 1952. Some parts, including a stone neck bearing, were donated to the Science Museum in London. The brick roundhouse now belongs to the Crown.

== Housing ==
Newton, offers a mix of housing options, including new developments and established properties.

- RAF Housing
- In 2013 Bellway and David Wilson Homes added 'Poppyfields' developments in and around Newton.
- Redrow is developing Newton Garden Village, offering new homes.
  - Redrow has been acquired by Barratt, there have now been changes to the original plans.

== Rushcliffe Borough Council ==
=== Newton Ward ===
Councillor Debbie Solomon is the Rushcliffe Borough Councillor for Newton Ward, which includes Newton, Saxondale, Shelford, Upper Saxondale.

She defected from The Conservatives to Reform UK on 8 October 2025 to stand as a single Reform UK Councillor.

=== Newton Parish Council ===
- The Parish Council two of the play areas with the third, on Oxford Drive, being managed and maintained by Redrow.
- Village Hall - The Village Hall will be situated on Oxford Drive adjacent to the Play Area and provide a much needed addition to the growing village

== Facilities/Amenities ==
Newton, has a 1936 Squadron Air Cadets which is used for parish council meetings. A new Village hall is being added as part of the Redrow development in additional to a cricket pitch and playground.

- Funding for a School in Newton as part of the expanded development has since been diverted to Bingham Primary which is not part of Newton catchment.
- A pedestrian footbridge over the A46 is still pending.
- There is no amenities such as a Shop, Cafe, Pub, Takeaway, Nursery, School, Doctors, Dentist that would be expected from a village.

== Commercial ==
The former RAF Newton site still contains several aircraft hangars, which are now used by businesses for distribution, such as John Deere and Blue Diamond Garden Centres under the ownership of Newton LLP. With the recent development(s) of housing in the area, there have been frequent complaints to the local planning authority concerning operating hours, the movement of heavy goods vehicles (HGVs) and staff through the residential villages, and proposed expansions to the commercial operations. Critics also argue that the commercial activities do not provide high-value employment opportunities for local residents.

A public consultation is currently underway (source) regarding a proposal to relocate heavy goods vehicle (HGV) traffic from Newton Lane, which runs through Redrow's Newton Garden Village development. The consultation follows significant public opposition to the original warehouse proposal at the former RAF Newton site.

Amendments to the RAF Newton proposals replace the previously proposed large B8 warehouse with additional residential development and omit the pedestrian footbridge over the A46, substantially reducing the scheme's connectivity provisions to neighbouring Bingham.

== See also ==
- Listed buildings in Newton, Nottinghamshire
