= St Peter and St Paul's Church, Church Warsop =

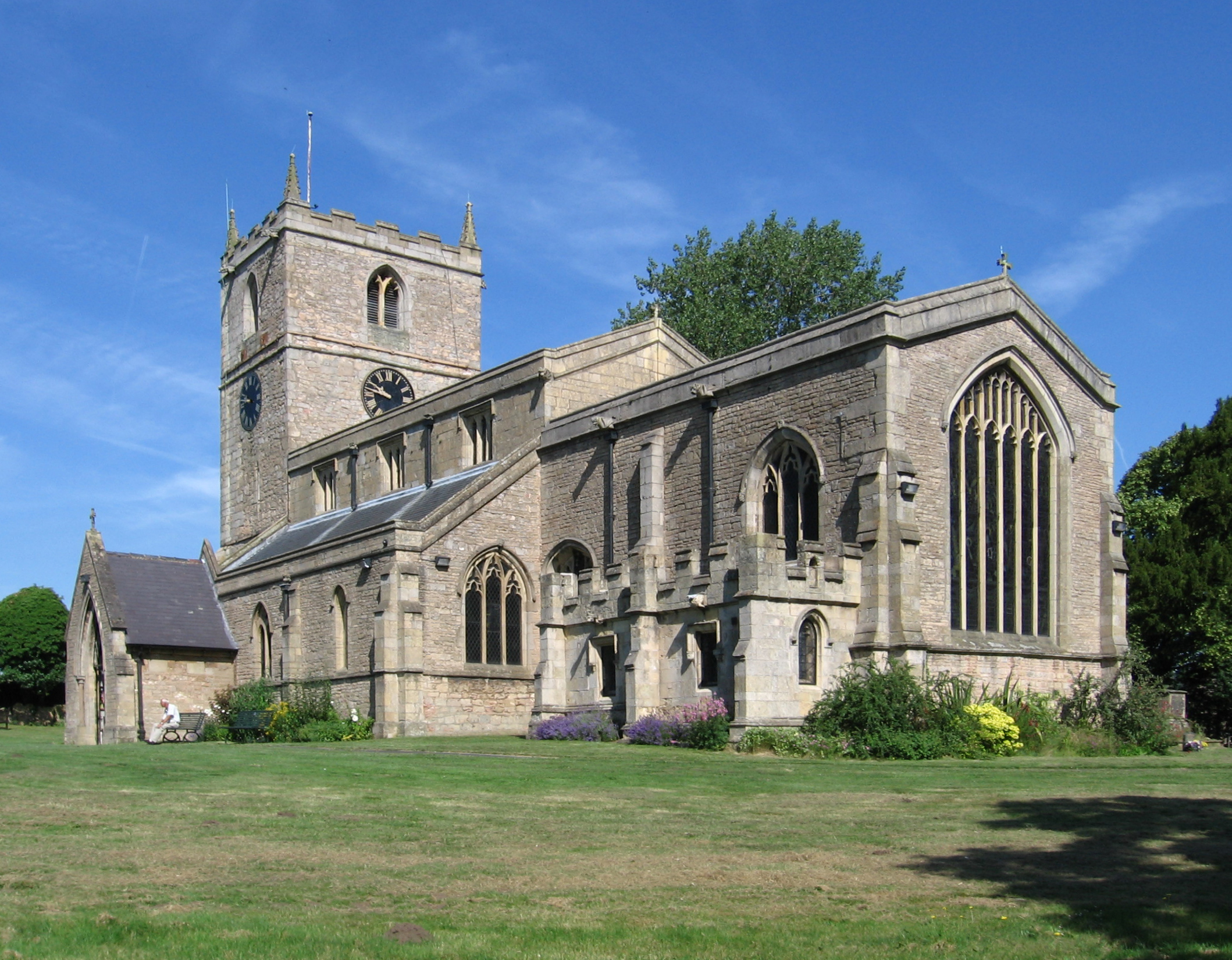
- St Peter and St Paul's Church, Church Warsop
- St Peter and St Paul's Church, Church Warsop
- 53°12′46.99″N 1°9′2.75″W
- OS grid reference: SK 56785 68801
- Location: Church Warsop
- Country: England
- Denomination: Church of England

History
- Dedication: St Peter and St Paul

Architecture
- Heritage designation: Grade I listed

Administration
- Diocese: Diocese of Southwell and Nottingham
- Archdeaconry: Newark
- Deanery: Mansfield
- Parish: Church Warsop

St Peter and St Paul's Church, Church Warsop is a Grade I listed parish church in the Church of England in Church Warsop.

Several gravestones, the boundary wall, gates, piers and overthrow in the churchyard are Grade II listed. Warsop parish centre in the church grounds is Grade II* listed

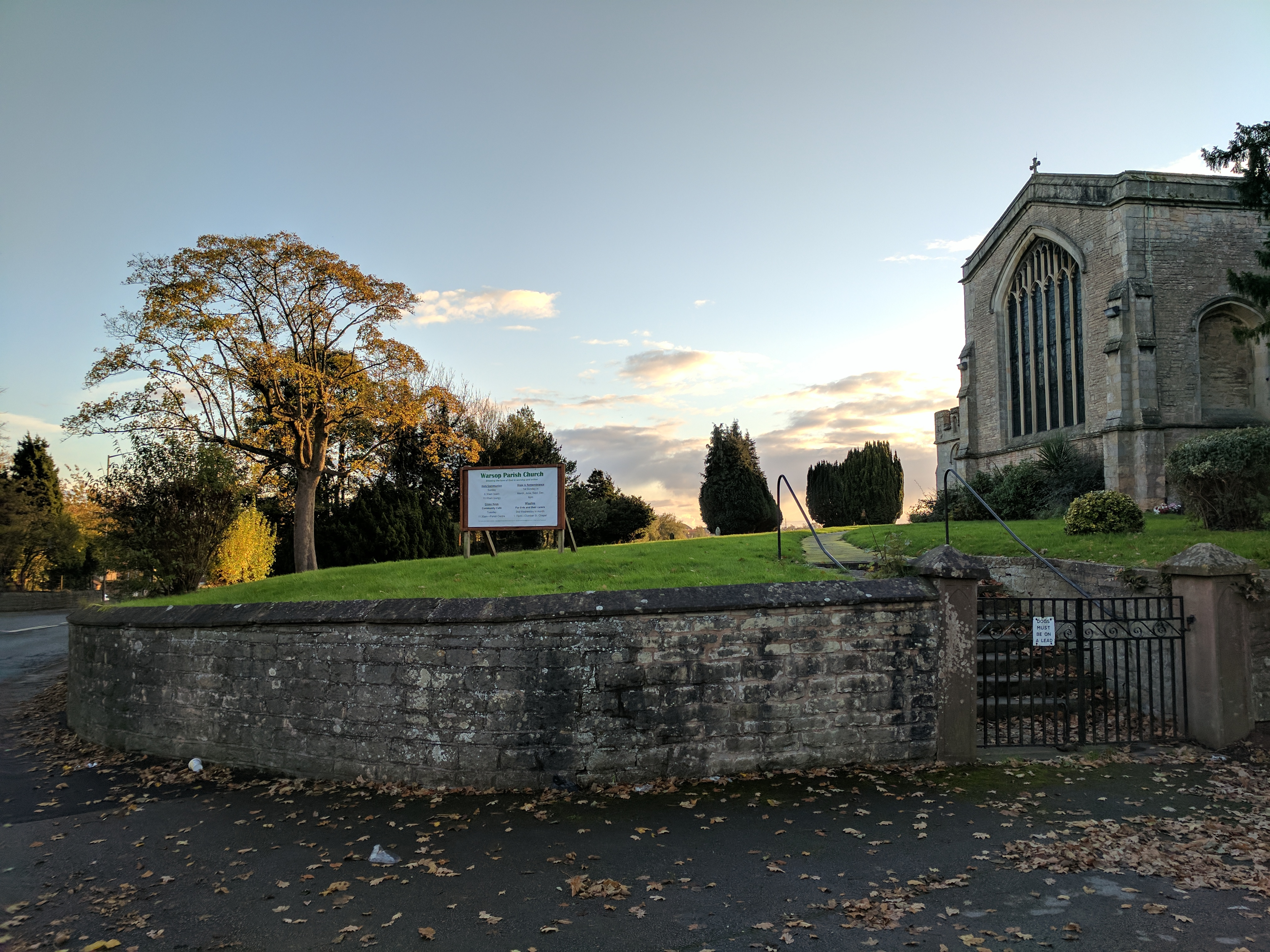
Boundary Wall, Gates, Piers And Overthrow

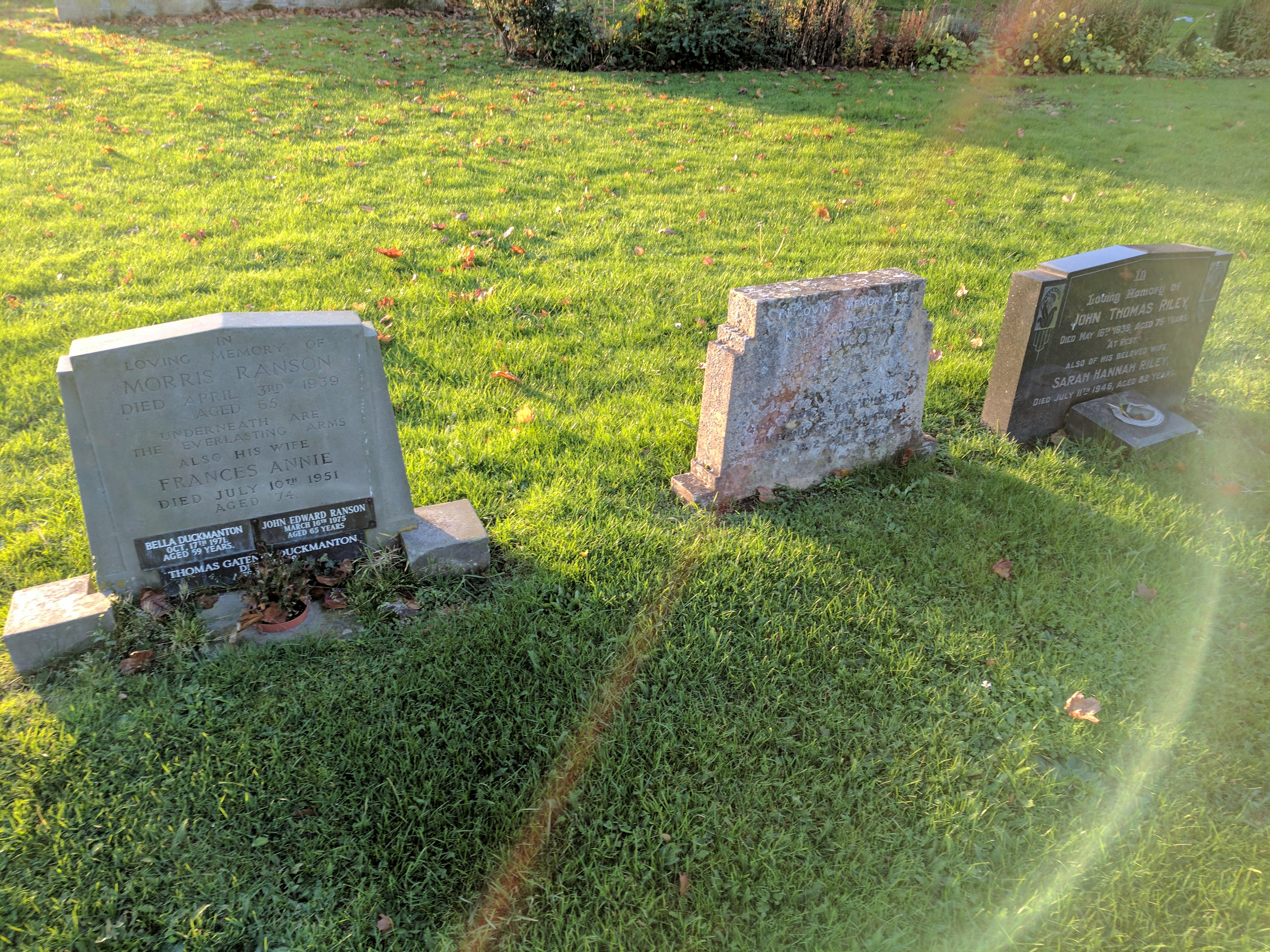
Group Of 3 Headstones Adjoining South Side Of Tower At Church Of St Peter And St Paul

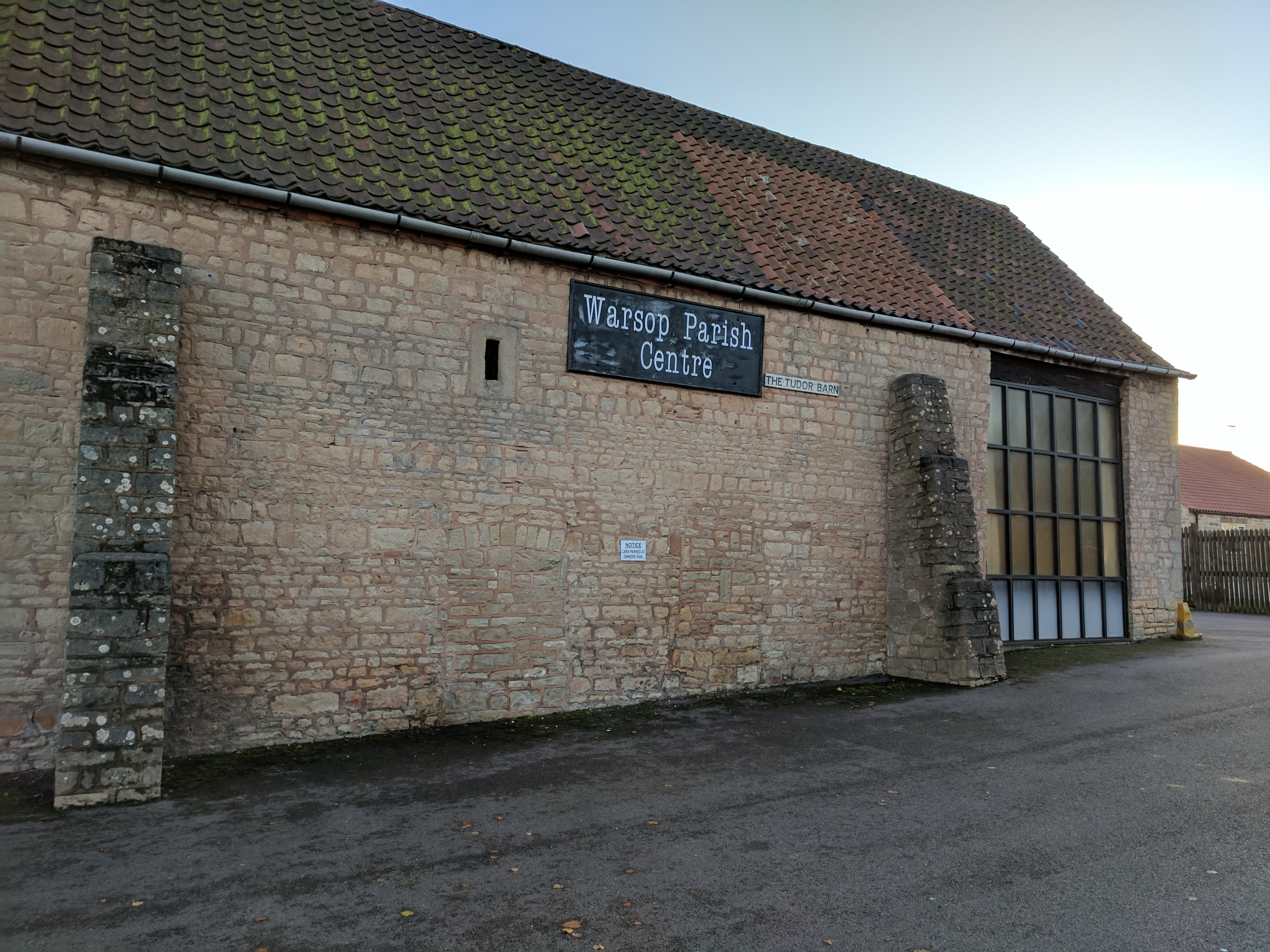
Warsop Parish Centre

== History ==
The church was built in the 11th century. It was restored and re-roofed, and a new organ chamber built in 1878.

== See also ==
- Grade I listed buildings in Nottinghamshire
- Listed buildings in Warsop

== Gallery ==
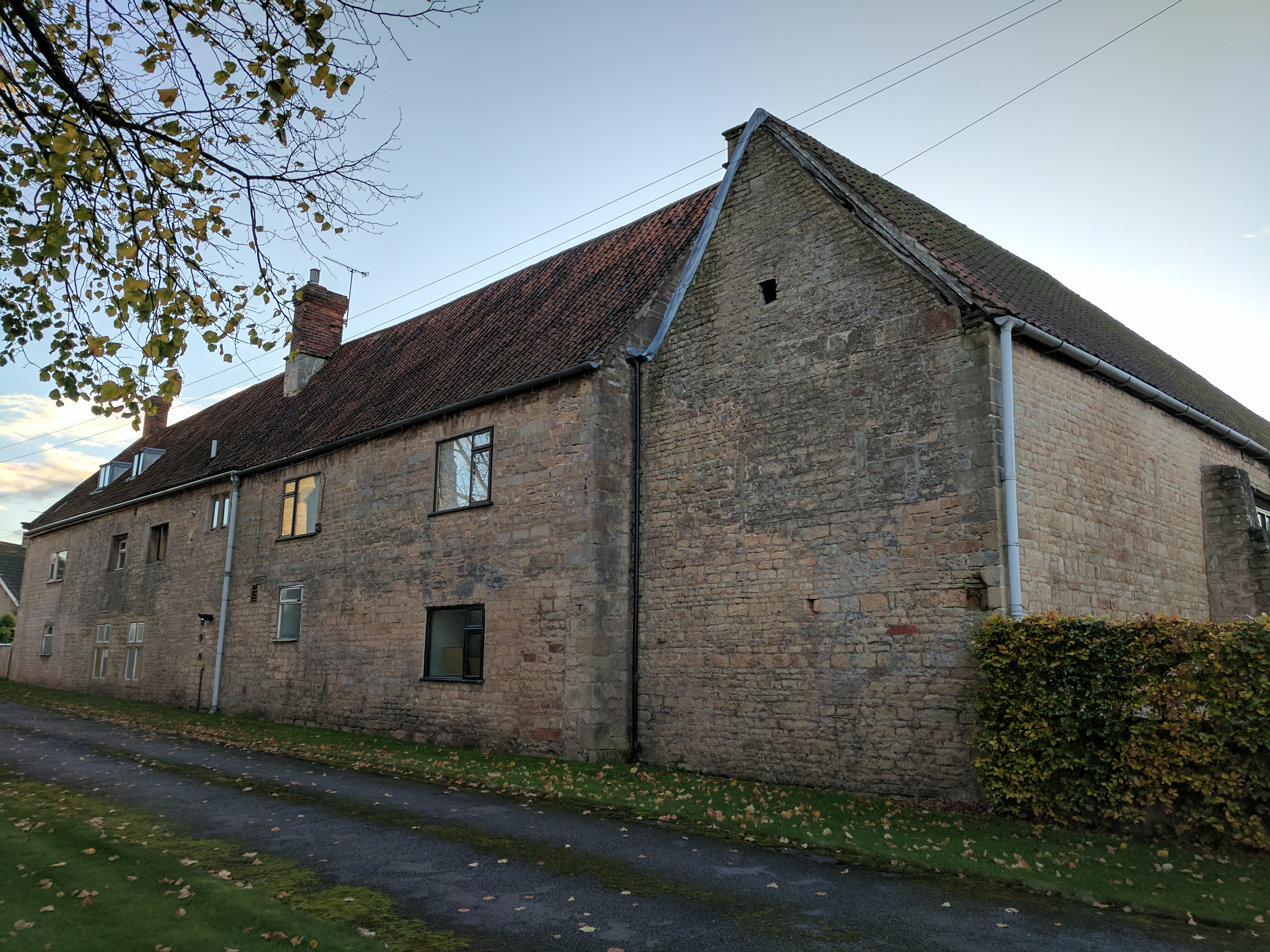
Warsop Parish Centre at St Peter and St Paul's Church, Church Warsop

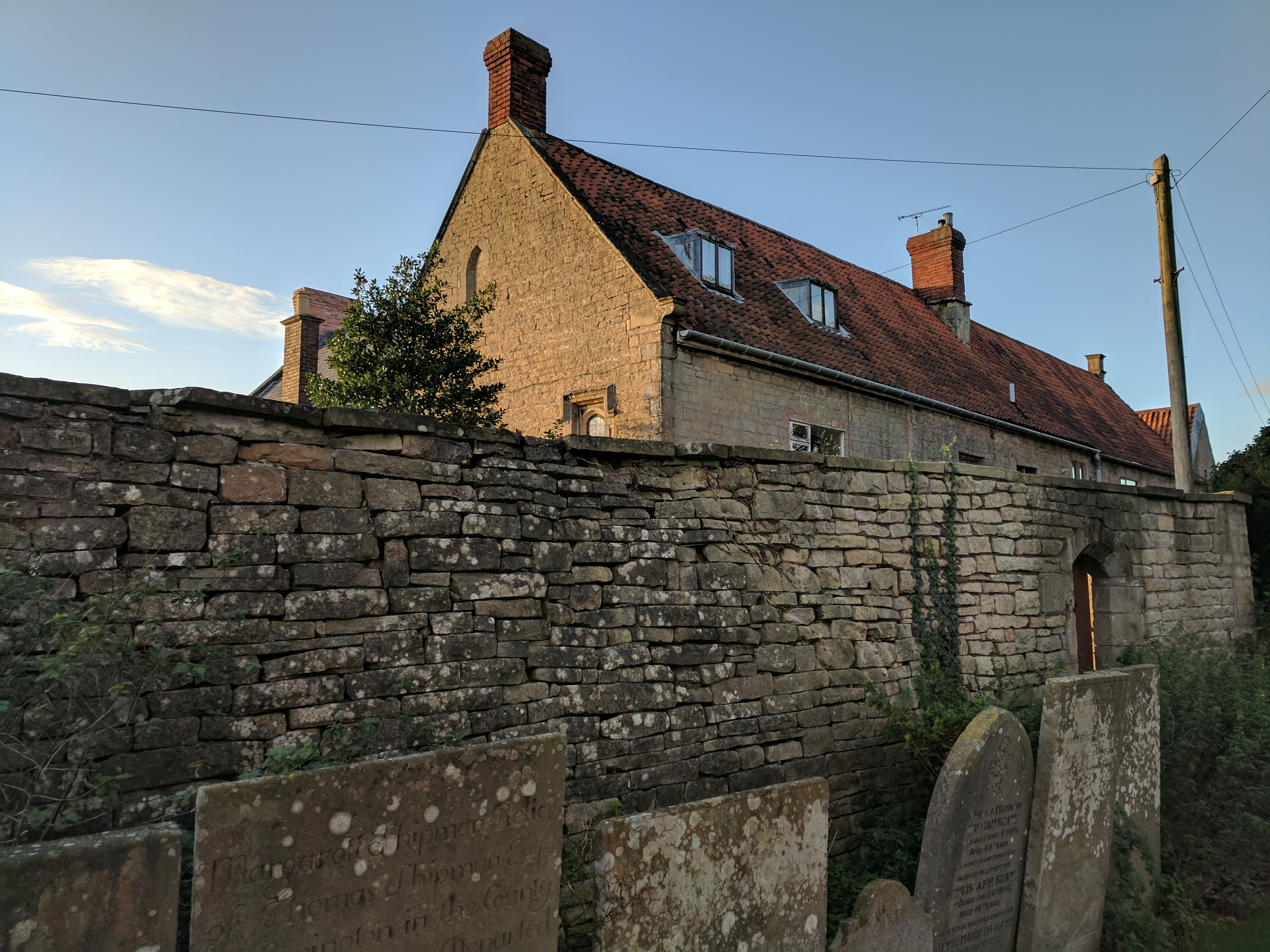
Warsop Parish Centre at St Peter and St Paul's Church, Church Warsop

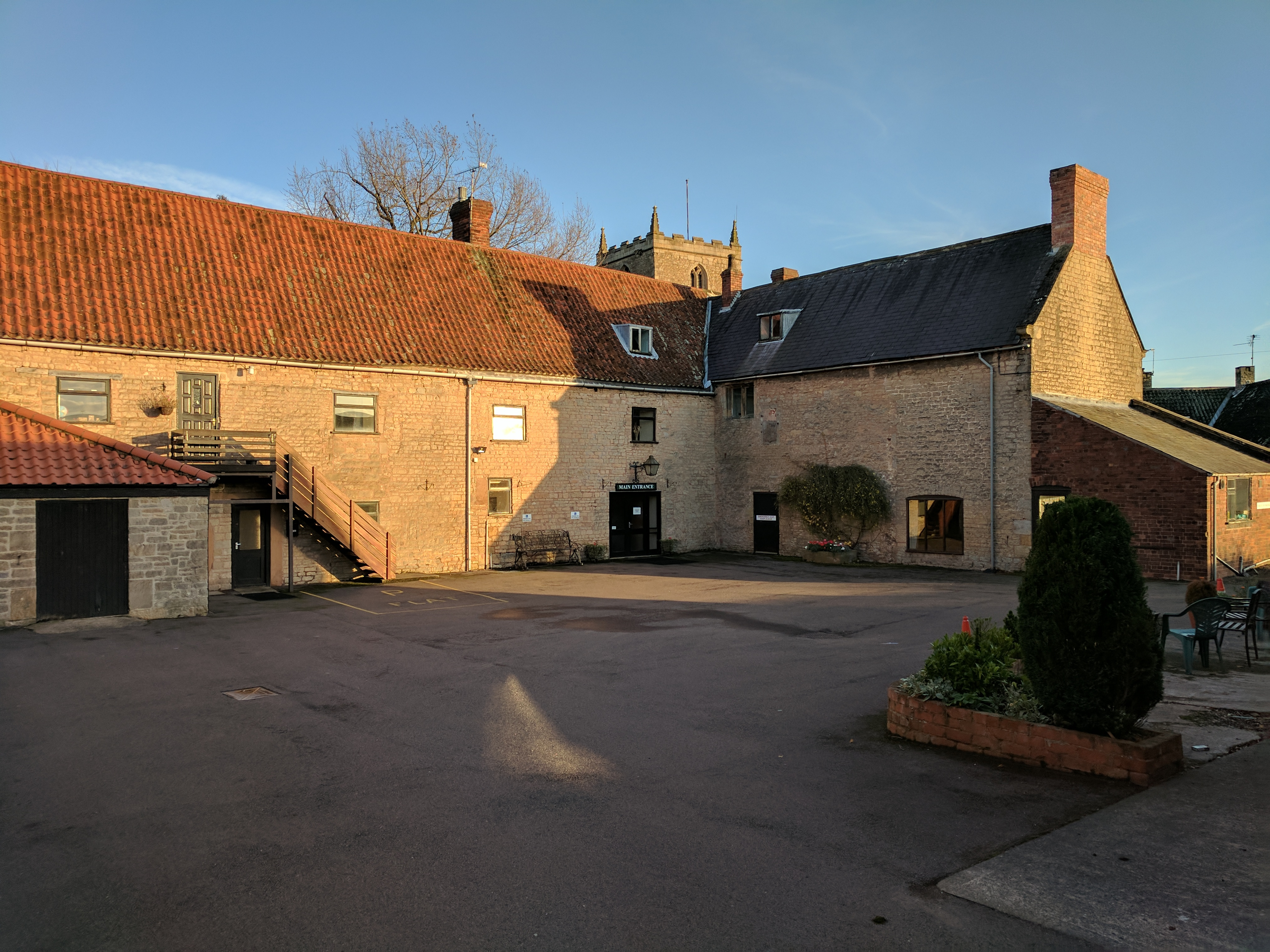
Warsop Parish Centre at St Peter and St Paul's Church, Church Warsop

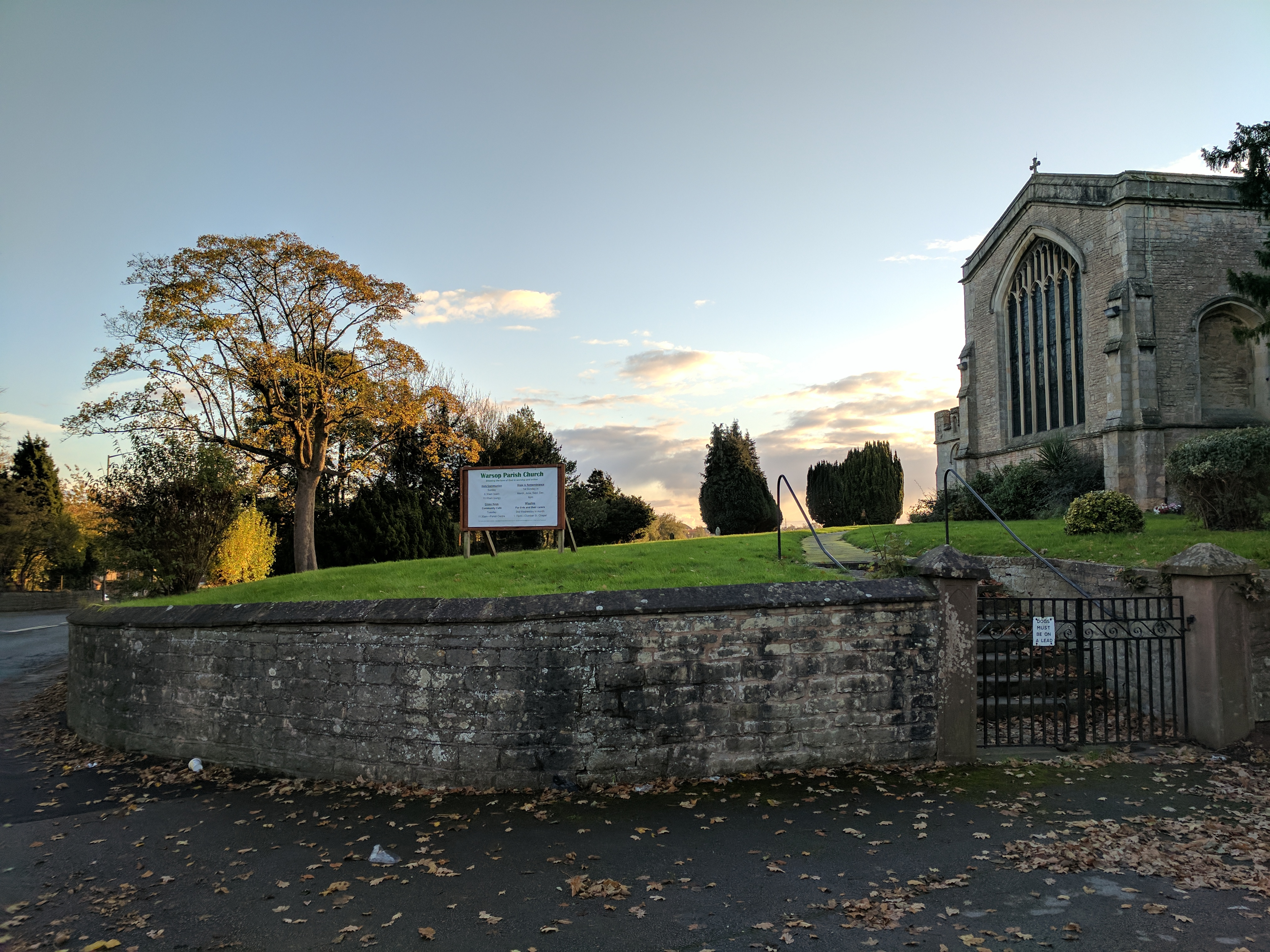
Boundary Wall, Gates, Piers And Overthrow at St Peter and St Paul's Church, Church Warsop

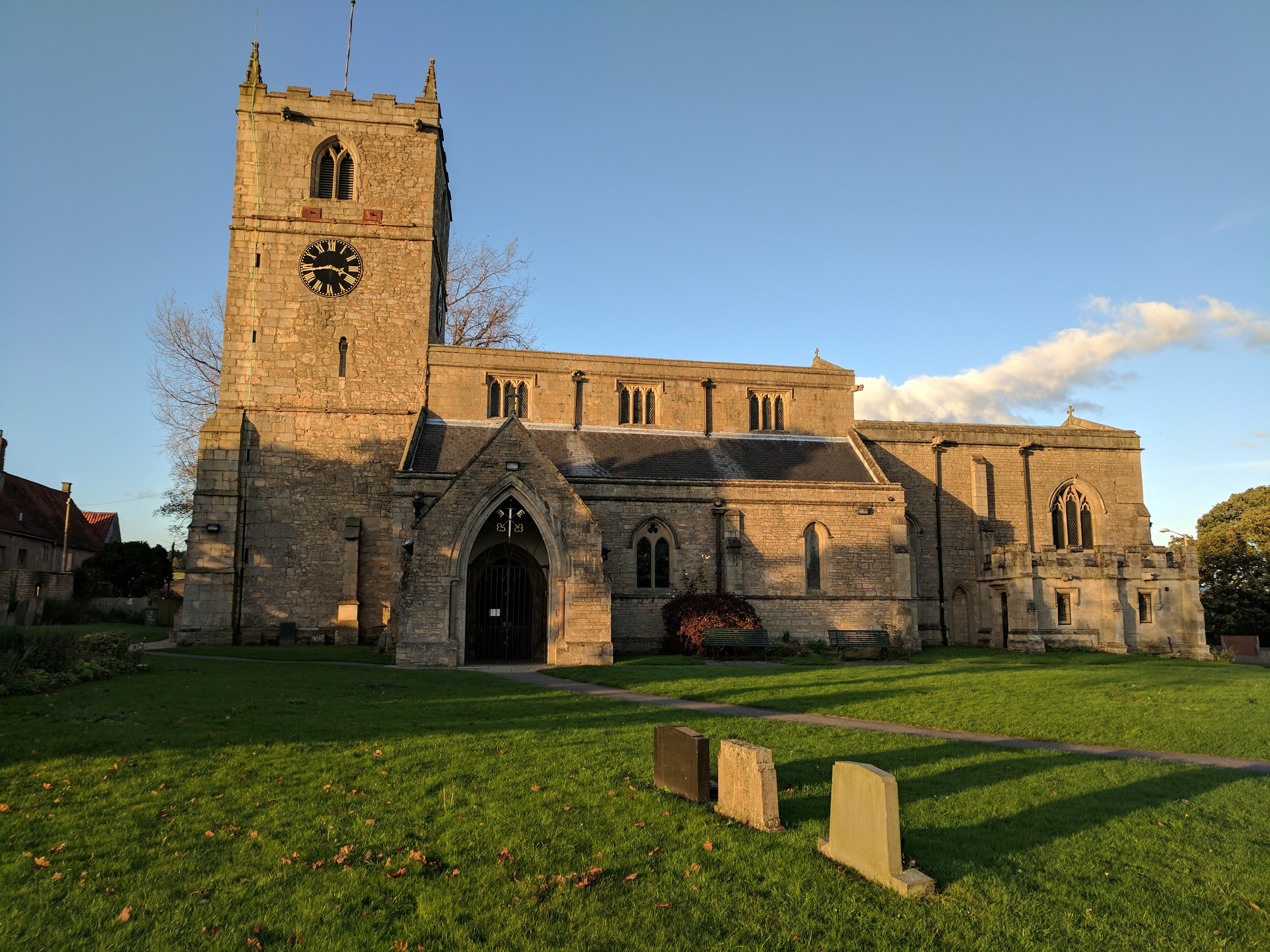
Group Of 3 Headstones Adjoining South Side Of Tower At Church Of St Peter And St Paul

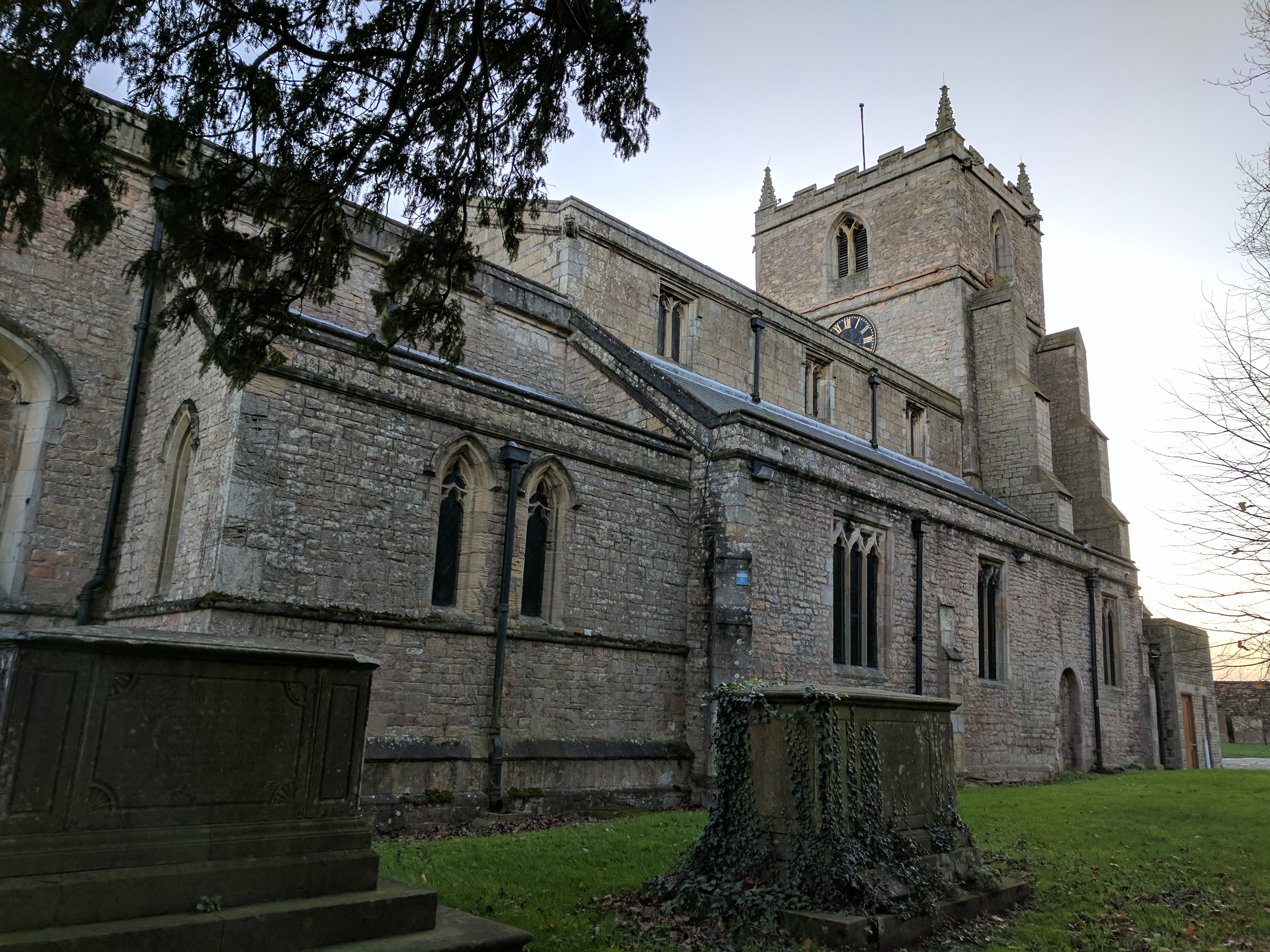
St Peter and St Paul's Church, Church Warsop

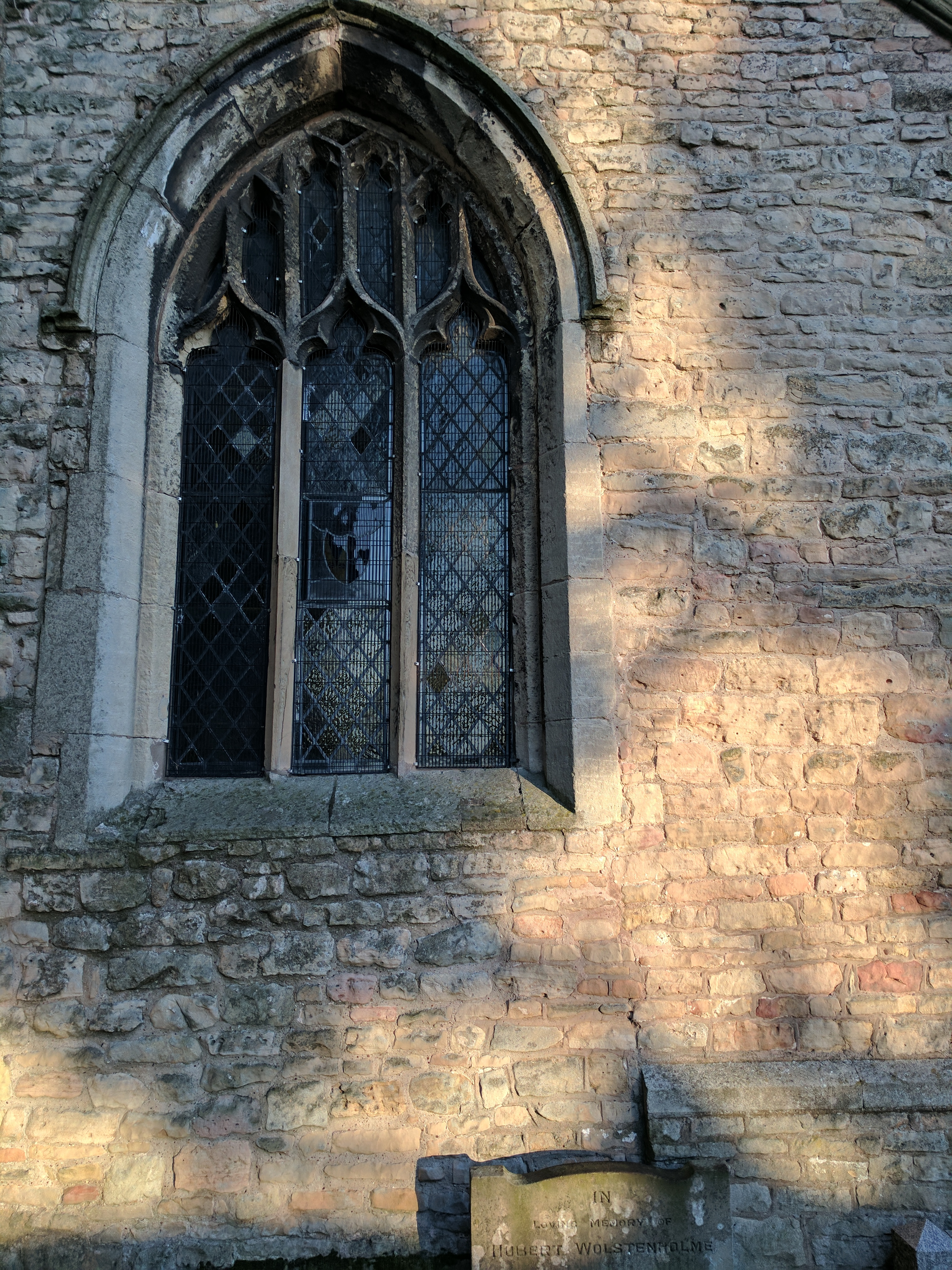
St Peter and St Paul's Church, Church Warsop

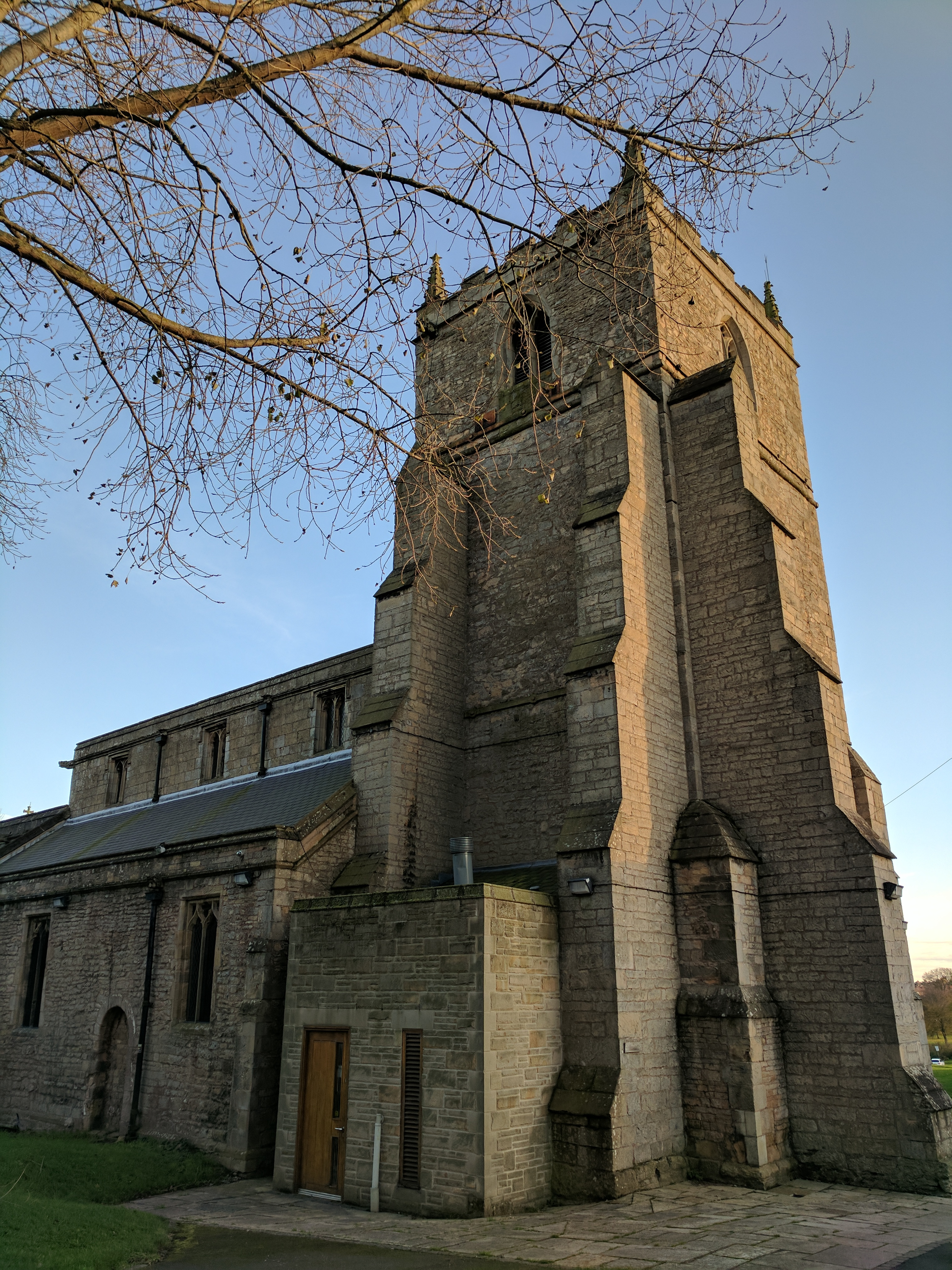
St Peter and St Paul's Church, Church Warsop
