= Torworth =

Village and civil parish in Nottinghamshire, England

Coordinates: 53.38°N 1.01°W

- Village and civil parish
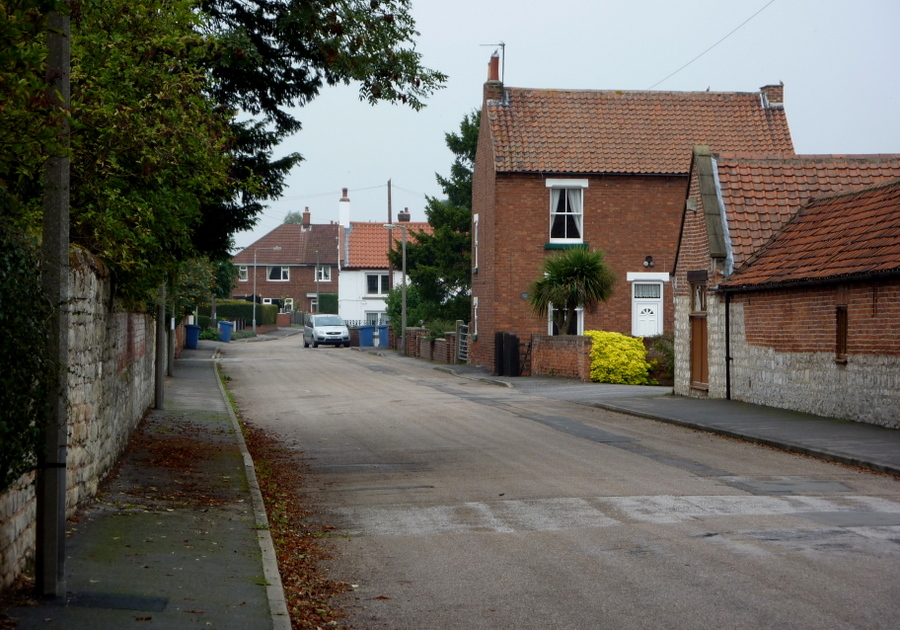
- Low Street, Torworth

- Location within Nottinghamshire
- Interactive map of Torworth
- Area: 2.21 sq mi (5.7 km^{2})
- Population: 244 (2021)
  - Density: 110/sq mi (42/km^{2})
- OS grid reference: SK 656869
  - London: 135 mi (217 km) SSE
- District: Bassetlaw
- Shire county: Nottinghamshire
- Region: East Midlands
- Country: England
- Sovereign state: United Kingdom
- Post town: RETFORD
- Postcode district: DN22
- Dialling code: 01777
- Police: Nottinghamshire
- Fire: Nottinghamshire
- Ambulance: East Midlands
- UK Parliament: Bassetlaw
- Website: www.torworth-pc.gov.uk

Torworth (/ˈtɔːrɜːrθ/) is a small village on the A638 or 'Great North Road' in North Nottinghamshire. According to the 2001 census it had a population of 264, falling marginally to 263 at the 2011 census, and further to 244 at the 2021 census.

== See also ==
- Listed buildings in Torworth

== Sources ==
- Torworth village website
