= Ragnall =

Village in Nottinghamshire, England

Coordinates: 53.24°N 0.79°W

- Village and civil parish
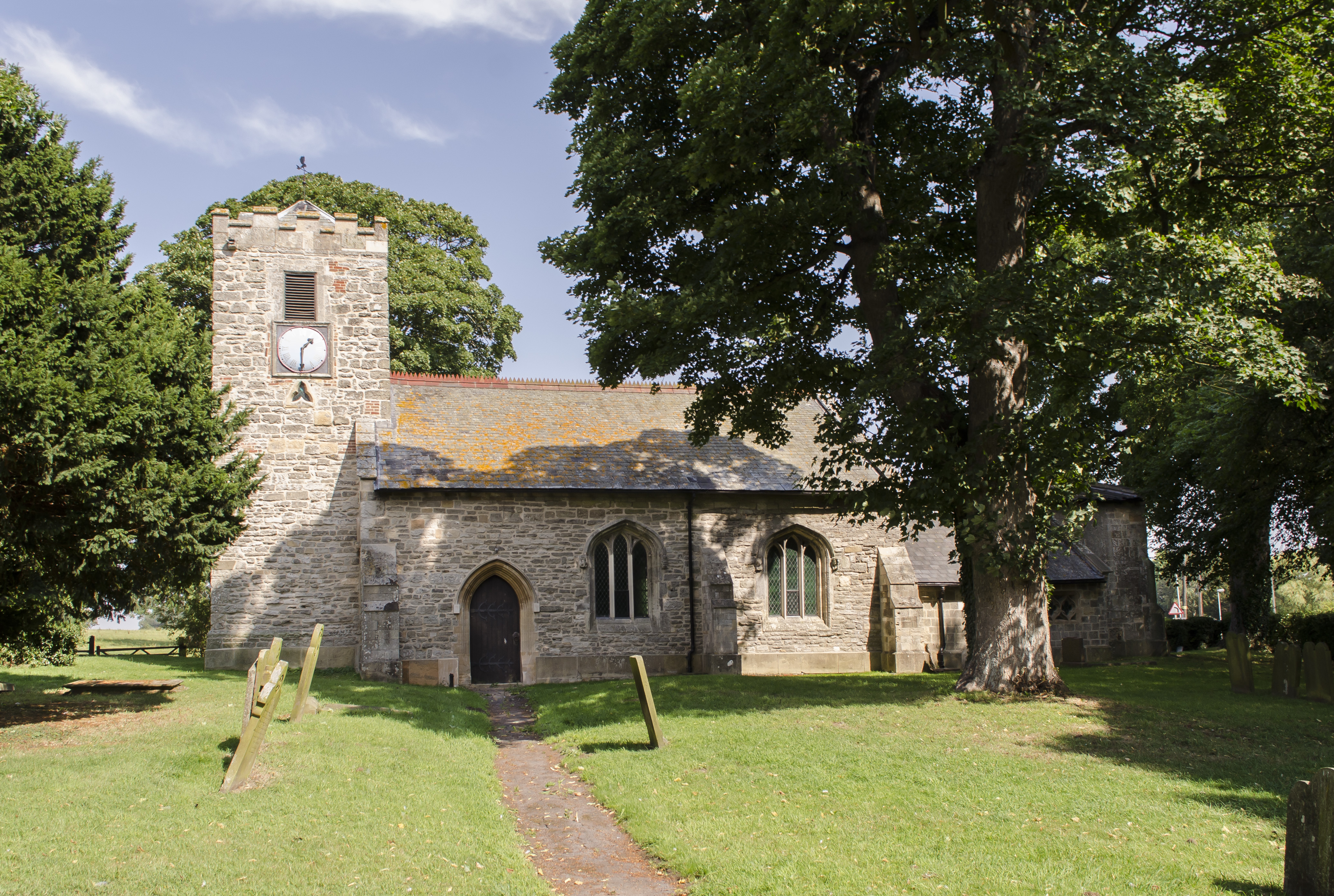
- St Leonards church, Ragnall

- Location within Nottinghamshire
- Interactive map of Ragnall
- Area: 1.89 sq mi (4.9 km^{2})
- Population: 88 (2021)
  - Density: 47/sq mi (18/km^{2})
- OS grid reference: SK 811721
  - London: 125 mi (201 km) SSE
- District: Bassetlaw
- Shire county: Nottinghamshire
- Region: East Midlands
- Country: England
- Sovereign state: United Kingdom
- Post town: NEWARK
- Postcode district: NG22
- Dialling code: 01777
- Police: Nottinghamshire
- Fire: Nottinghamshire
- Ambulance: East Midlands
- UK Parliament: Newark
- Website: www.dunham-and-district-notts.org.uk

Ragnall is a village and civil parish in Nottinghamshire, England. At the time of the 2001 census it had a population of 102, increasing to 146 at the 2011 census (with Fledborough), and falling to 88 for the 2021 census. It is located on the A57 road one mile west of the River Trent. The parish church of St Leonard was extensively rebuilt in 1864–67. Ragnall Hall at the south end of the village is a 19th-century replacement of an early 17th-century hall, the main parts of the earlier hall surviving as barns.

The village is recorded in the Domesday Book of 1086 as Ragenehil. The name is derived from two elements: one is the Old Scandinavian personal name Ragni; the other element is the Old English hyll, meaning "hill". Thus, Ragenehil represents "Hill of a man called Ragni".

The hamlet of Fledborough is one mile south of Ragnall. The church of St Gregory at Fledborough has some 14th-century stained glass in the east window of the north aisle, restored in 1852–57.

== See also ==
- Listed buildings in Ragnall
