= Grassthorpe =

Hamlet and civil parish in Nottinghamshire, England

Coordinates: 53.200°N 0.809°W

- Hamlet and civil parish
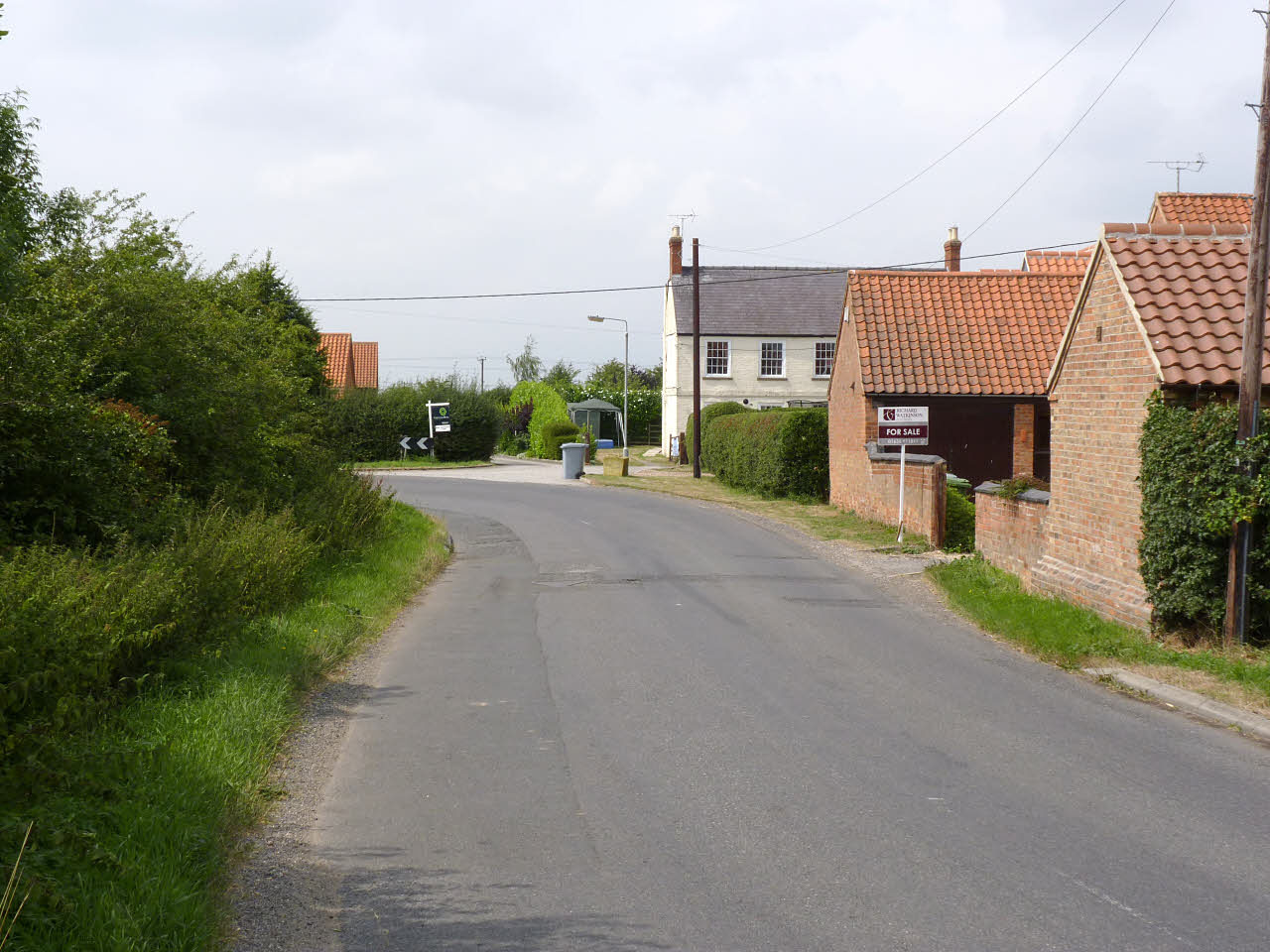
- Town Street, Grassthorpe

- Location within Nottinghamshire
- Interactive map of Grassthorpe
- Area: 1.11 sq mi (2.9 km^{2})
- Population: 55 (2021)
  - Density: 50/sq mi (19/km^{2})
- OS grid reference: SK 795677
  - London: 120 mi (190 km) SSE
- District: Newark and Sherwood
- Shire county: Nottinghamshire
- Region: East Midlands
- Country: England
- Sovereign state: United Kingdom
- Post town: NEWARK
- Postcode district: NG23
- Dialling code: 01636
- Police: Nottinghamshire
- Fire: Nottinghamshire
- Ambulance: East Midlands
- UK Parliament: Newark

Grassthorpe is a hamlet and civil parish in the Newark and Sherwood district of Nottinghamshire, England. Population from the 2021 census was 55 residents.

A former chapel of St James was in the village. It was converted into a cottage and barn during the reign of Elizabeth I. There is also a disused watermill.

In the 1660s Gresthorpe Hall (i.e. Grassthorpe) was rented to Robert Shawe who supported the Quaker William Smith of Besthorpe (d. 1672) in speaking to 150 people of the ‘lowest and meanest’ sort there. Smith was allowed to attend by his Nottingham gaoler Robert White causing a sharp complaint in August 1669 from Rev John Hewes, the vicar of Normanton.

There are three windmills recorded at Grassthorpe.

1. A post mill was moved to Tuxford in 1814.
2. A composite post mill was moved in 1870, again to Tuxford.
3. A tower windmill in an orchard belonged to the Seels family. The miller in 1844 was Thomas Seels; the mill passed to Samuel Seels, who was 82 in 1935. The windmill was 3 storeys high, 14-foot (4.3 m) wide at the base, having 2 pairs of stones and dressing machinery. The top of the mill was pulled down by engine in 1934. At some time previously the sails had been blown down, supposedly being "too heavy".

There are four Grade II Listed buildings in the village:

- The Pinfold, Copper Hill
- The Pigeoncote at The Manor House
- The Manor House and Boundary Wall
- Snowdrop Cottage, Town Street

== See also ==
- Listed buildings in Grassthorpe
