= Church Warsop =

Village in Nottinghamshire, England

Coordinates: 53.21°N 1.15°W

- Village
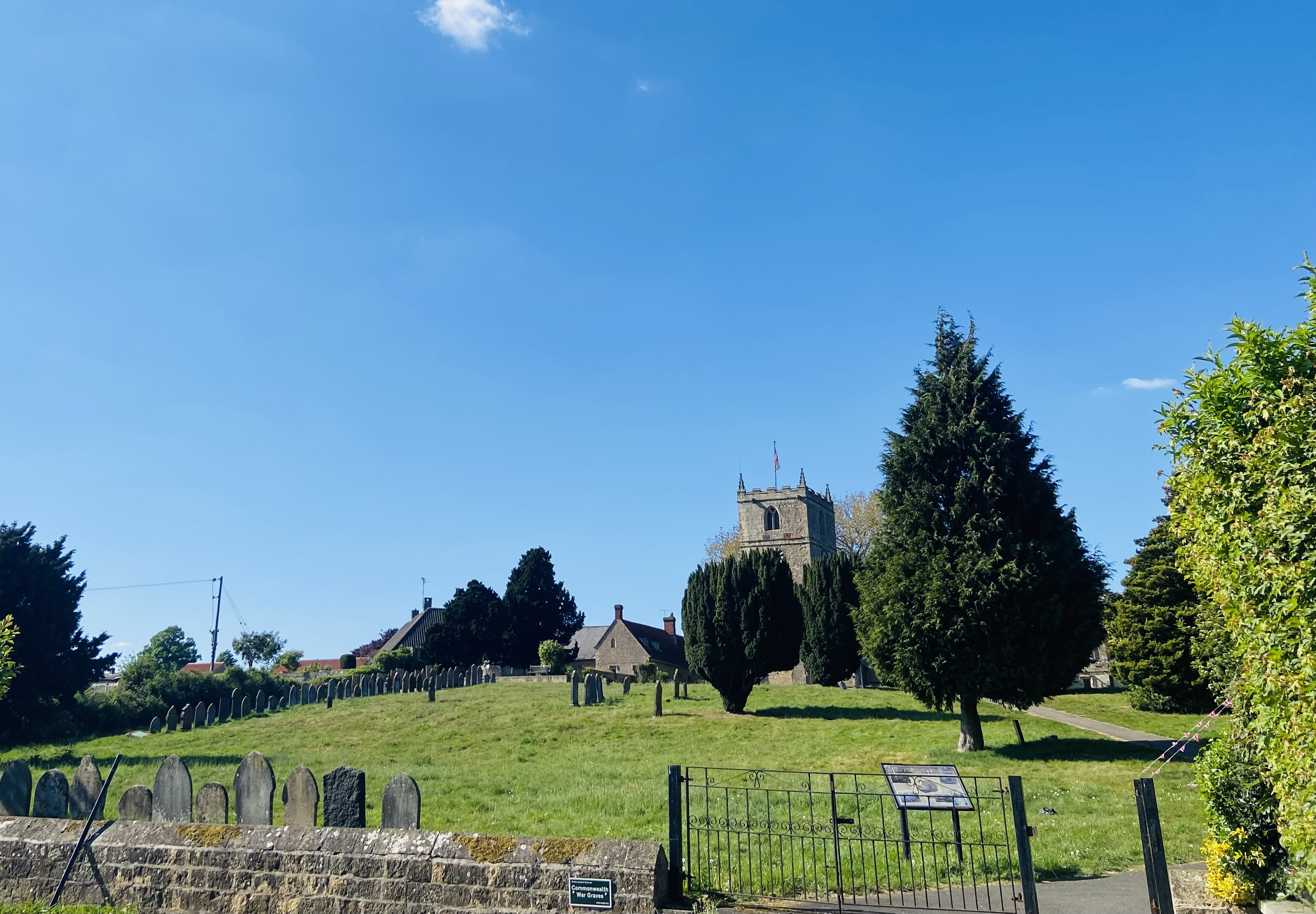
- St Peter and St Paul’s Church

- Location within Nottinghamshire
- OS grid reference: SK567688
- Civil parish: Warsop
- District: Mansfield
- Shire county: Nottinghamshire
- Region: East Midlands
- Country: England
- Sovereign state: United Kingdom
- Post town: MANSFIELD
- Postcode district: NG20
- Dialling code: 01623
- Police: Nottinghamshire
- Fire: Nottinghamshire
- Ambulance: East Midlands
- UK Parliament: Mansfield
- Website: warsopparishcouncil.co.uk

Church Warsop is a village in Nottinghamshire, England. It is located 1 mile north of Market Warsop, on the north side of the River Meden, and is within the Warsop civil parish. Church Warsop leads onto the village of Cuckney via Cuckney Hill. This area is part of Mansfield District.

The parish church of St Peter and St Paul is early Norman.

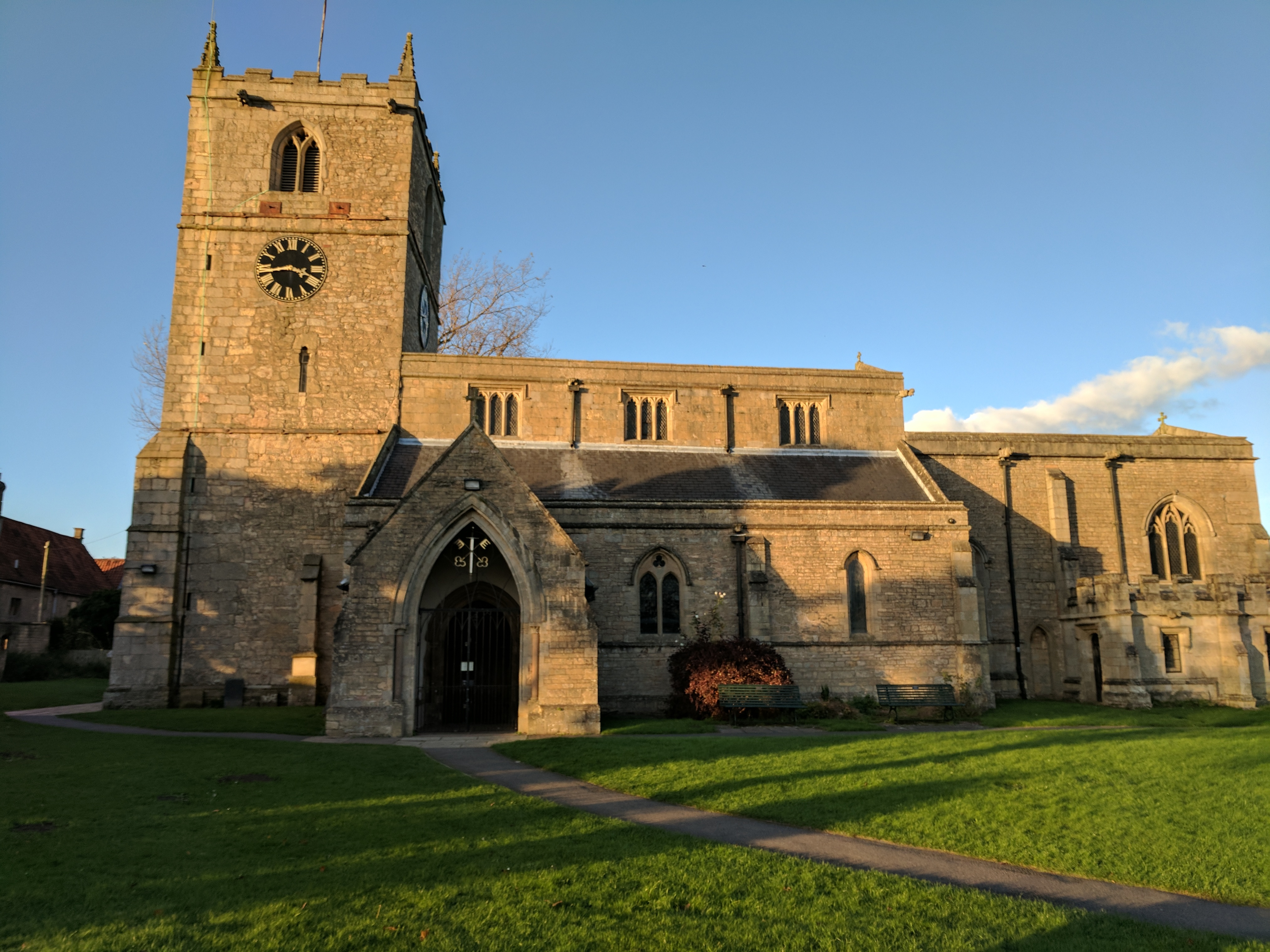
St Peter and St Paul’s Church

== History ==
The village was originally a settlement of farms and old stone houses around the church. It was expanded in 1926 by the Staveley Coal and Iron Company, to house colliery workers and their families working at their Warsop Main Colliery located in nearby Warsop Vale. This was at the time of the 1926 general strike in support of striking miners, and it has been claimed by the daughter of a miner on strike in 1984-1985 that these were miners who returned to work during the strike, and that the village is known locally as "the alley", an abbreviation of "scab alley". There is also a second church, the "Chapel of Bethlem", from the same date as much of the village.

== Politics ==
Church Warsop is part of the Mansfield Parliamentary constituency from the 2010 boundary changes, represented by Labour's Steve Yemm after the July 2024 general election, and previously from 2017 to 2024 by Ben Bradley of the Conservative Party. It is in the civil parish of Warsop.

== Gallery ==
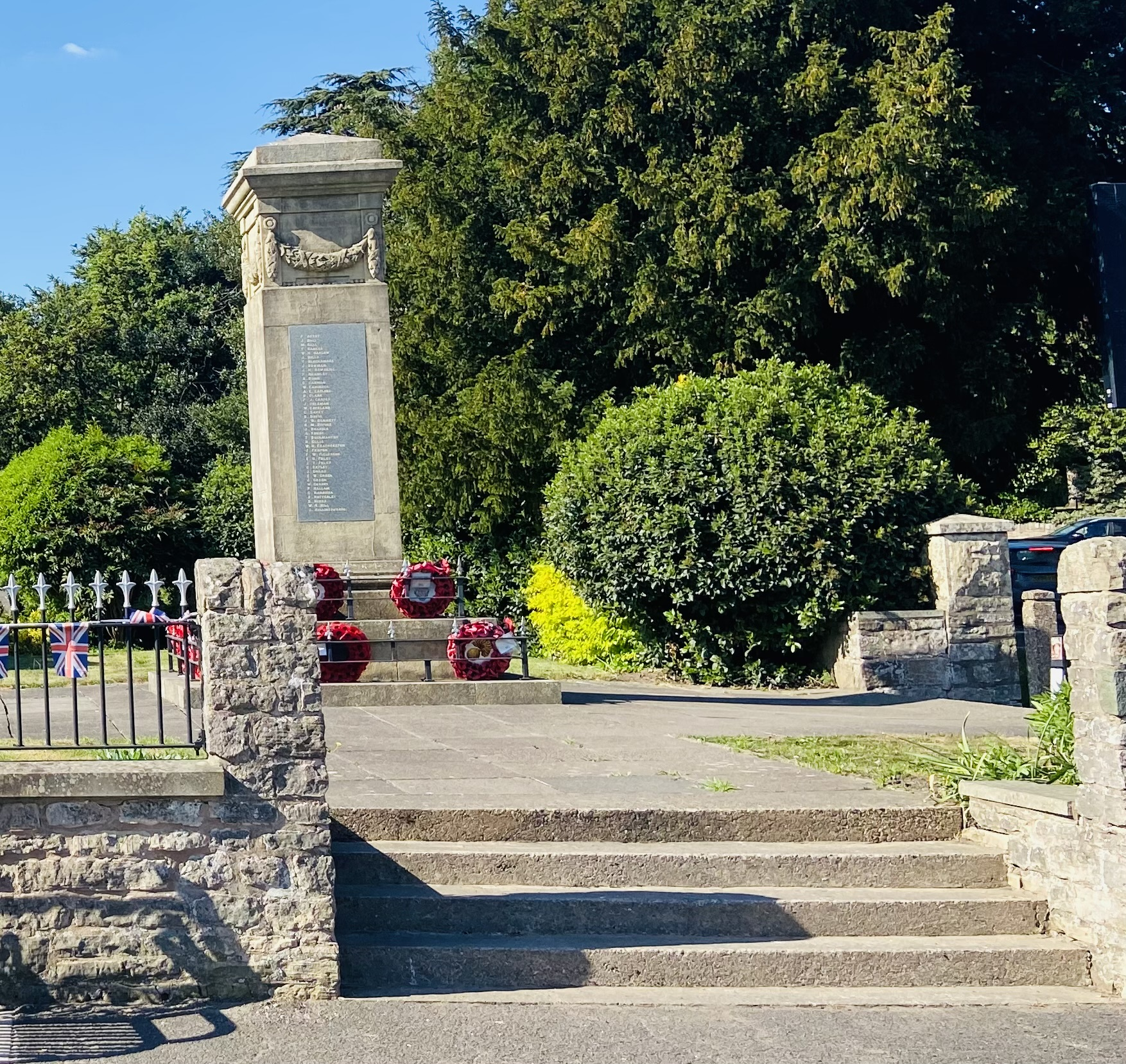
The War Memorial, Church Warsop

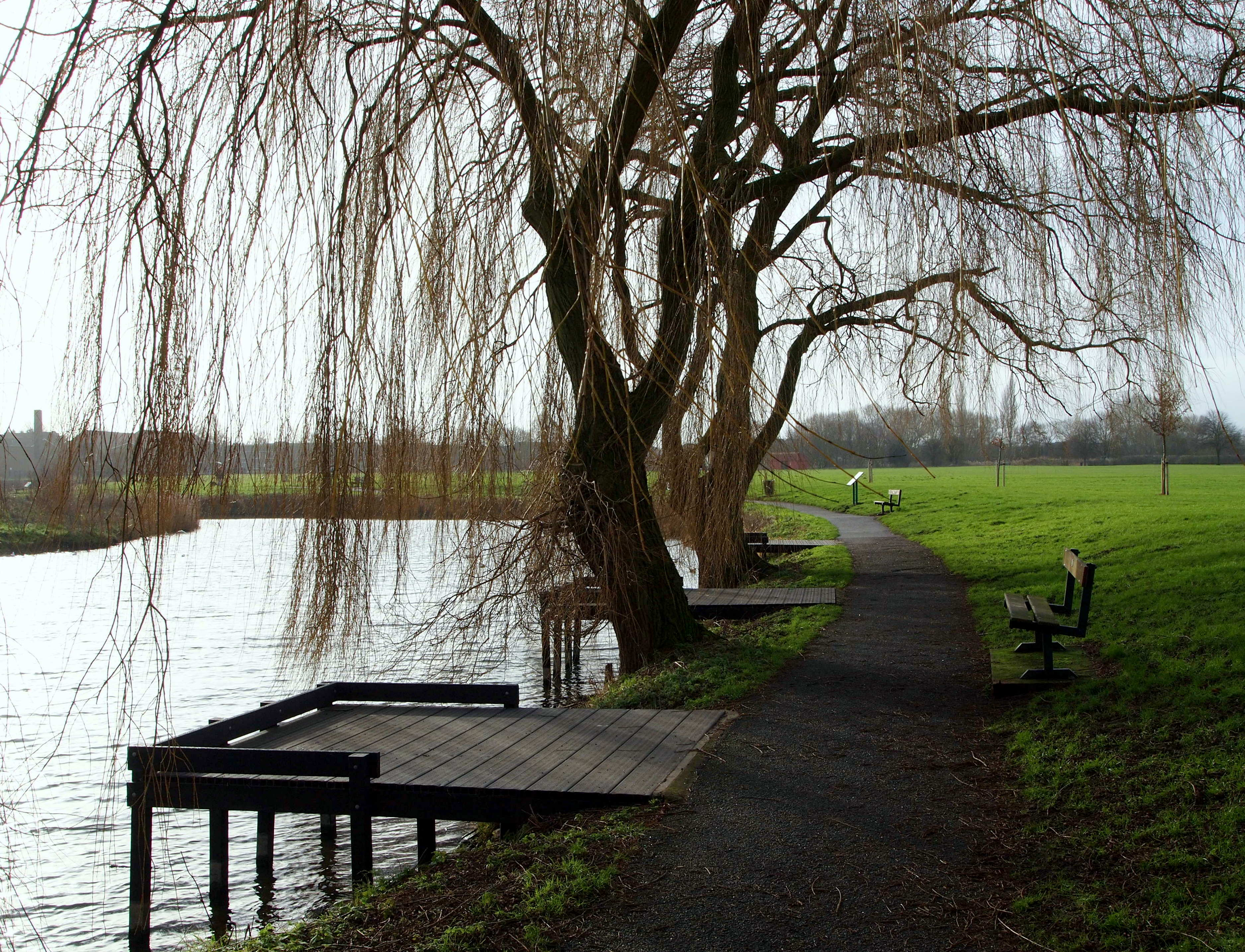
Warsop Mill Pond, Church Warsop

== See also ==
- Listed buildings in Warsop
