= Listed buildings in Ragnall =

Ragnall is a civil parish in the Bassetlaw District of Nottinghamshire, England. The parish contains six listed buildings that are recorded in the National Heritage List for England. Of these, one is listed at Grade II*, the middle of the three grades, and the others are at Grade II, the lowest grade. The parish contains the village of Ragnall and the surrounding countryside. The listed buildings consist of houses, farmhouses, farm buildings, a church, and the entrance to the churchyard.

== Key ==
Grade	Criteria
II*	Particularly important buildings of more than special interest
II	Buildings of national importance and special interest

== Buildings ==
Name and location	Photograph	Date	Notes	Grade
Ragnall Hall and outbuildings 53.25294°N 0.80030°W		Early 17th century	A country house, largely replaced in the 19th century by a farmhouse. This is in rendered red brick on a plinth, with quoins, a floor band, and hipped slate roof with overhanging eaves. There are two storeys and an east front of three bays, and a recessed single-bay wing on the right with a parapet. In the centre is a flat-roofed porch containing an arched entrance with a pendant keystone flanked by roundels. The windows are sashes with wedge lintels and keystones. Further to the right is the 17th-century wing, in red brick and stone, with two storeys and attics, and five bays, the other 17th century wing has two storeys and three bays, and elsewhere is the former malthouse.	II
Barn, Ragnall Stables; 53.25423°N 0.79800°W	—	c. 1700	The aisled barn is timber framed with brick walls and a pantile roof. There is a single aisle to the east, and the barn contains doorways. On the west side is a single-storey red brick stable block with a hipped roof and dentilled eaves, and on the south side is a single-storey range converted into a cottage.	II
Ragnall House; 53.25447°N 0.79804°W		Mid 18th century	The house is in red brick with a floor band, dentilled eaves, and a slate roof with brick coped gables and kneelers. There are three storeys and an L-shaped plan, with a south front of four bays. On this front are two bay windows. The other windows are sashes, most with segmental heads. In the left return is a doorway with a fanlight, side lights and a segmental head. To the right and recessed is a two-storey wing, and at the rear is a two-storey two-bay extension.	II
Whimpton House; 53.25735°N 0.81310°W		Early 19th century	A farmhouse in red brick on a rendered base, with a painted band, a moulded eaves band, and a pantile roof. There are three storeys, and three bays, a two-storey single-bay wing on the right, and a two-storey rear extension. The doorway has a moulded surround and a traceried fanlight, the windows in the lower two floors are sashes with wedge lintels and keystones, and the upper floor contains casement windows.	II
St Leonard's Church; 53.25405°N 0.79931°W		1864–67	The church was largely rebuilt and extended by Ewan Christian. It is built in stone, the chancel has a lead roof and the other roofs are slated. The church consists of a nave, a chancel with a south aisle, and a west tower. The tower has an embattled parapet and a pyramidal roof, the bell openings are rectangular, and on the south front is a clock face above a trefoil.	II*
Gateway, St Leonard's Church; 53.25367°N 0.79922°W		Late 19th century	The entrance to the churchyard is flanked by engaged moulded stone columns, the capitals with fleurons. Between the columns is an iron overthrow and gates. Outside, there are stone coped walls on a plinth, sloping up to the columns.	II
