= Listed buildings in Newton, Nottinghamshire =

Parish with 4 Grade II listed buildings, including farmhouses and a windmill base

Newton is a civil parish in the Rushcliffe district of Nottinghamshire, England. The parish contains four listed buildings that are recorded in the National Heritage List for England. All the listed buildings are designated at Grade II, the lowest of the three grades, which is applied to "buildings of national importance and special interest". The parish contains the village of Newton and the surrounding countryside, and the listed buildings consist of farmhouses, farm buildings and the base of a windmill.

== Buildings ==
Name and location	Photograph	Date	Notes
Yew Tree Farmhouse and barn 52.96989°N 0.97654°W		Mid 18th century	The farmhouse is in red brick with dentilled eaves and a pantile roof. There are two storeys, the main block has three bays, a central doorway with a fanlight, and sash windows, those in the ground floor with segmental arches. To the right is a taller wing with two bays, coped gables with kneelers, and tripartite casement windows. Projecting from the left is a turret with a flat roof. Attached to the right is a barn with a single storey and a loft, containing a large carriageway.
Range of three barns, White House; 52.96955°N 0.97473°W	—	Mid 18th century	The barns are in red brick with some stone, and pantile roofs. The left barn is slightly recessed on a brick plinth, the middle barn has a brick plinth, and the right barn is on a stone plinth.
White House; 52.96930°N 0.97468°W	—	1754	A house, rendered probably over brick, with an eaves band and a slate roof. There are two storeys and five bays. The central doorway has a fanlight and a hood, and the windows are sashes. In the right gable end is an initialled and dated stone plaque.
Windmill; 52.97258°N 0.98848°W		Early 19th century	The base of a post windmill, in red brick with dogtooth eaves. There is a circular plan and two storeys, and it is buttressed. In the ground floor is a segmental-arched doorway and a single window, and there is a single window above.
