= Listed buildings in Torworth =

Torworth is a civil parish in the Bassetlaw District of Nottinghamshire, England. The parish contains five listed buildings that are recorded in the National Heritage List for England. All the listed buildings are designated at Grade II, the lowest of the three grades, which is applied to "buildings of national importance and special interest". The parish contains the village of Torworth and the surrounding countryside, and the listed buildings consist of a house and associated structures, and three farmhouses.

== Buildings ==
Name and location	Photograph	Date	Notes
The Mantles; 53.37655°N 1.04114°W		Late 18th century	A stone house on a plinth, with floor and sill bands, and hipped slate roofs with overhanging eaves. There are two storeys and three bays, and recessed to the left is a recessed extension with a single storey and an attic and three bays. On the centre of the main range is a porch with Doric columns and a decorated entablature, and a doorway with Doric pilasters and a traceried fanlight. In the extension is a doorway with a plain fanlight and a slightly projecting hood. The windows in both parts are sashes.
Stable block, barn and outbuildings, The Mantles; 53.37670°N 1.04061°W	—	Late 18th century	The buildings are in stone and red brick, and have pantile roofs. The stable block has a central gabled bay with two storeys and a loft, flanked by two-storey five-bay wings. In the centre is a tall elliptical carriage entrance with a keystone, the wings are on a plinth and have quoins and dentilled eaves, and all the openings are under segmental arches. Projecting from the right are the other buildings, the barn with two storeys and a loft, and three bays, and flanking it are brick stores. Projecting from the right wing is a single-storey six-bay outbuilding.
Manor Farmhouse; 53.37364°N 1.01309°W		Early 19th century	The farmhouse is rendered, on a plinth, with an eaves band and hipped slate roofs on bracketed eaves. There are two storeys, three bays, and a projecting cross wing on the right. The central doorway has a moulded architrave, a fanlight and a slightly projecting hood, and the windows are sashes.
Moat Farmhouse; 53.37292°N 1.01189°W	—	Early 19th century	A red brick farmhouse with dentilled eaves and a pantile roof. There are two storeys and an L-shaped plan, with a main range of five bays, and an east wing with two bays. On the front is a gabled and tiled porch, and a doorway with a plain surround and a fanlight, and the windows are sashes. All the openings are under segmental arches.
Poplar Farmhouse; 53.37358°N 1.01271°W	—	Early 19th century	The farmhouse is in rendered brick, with a floor band, overhanging eaves and a slate roof. There are two storeys, a front range of three bays, and a three-bay rear wing. The central doorway has a moulded architrave, a semicircular fanlight, and a hood on brackets. Most of the windows are sashes, and in the rear wing is a casement window.
