= Listed buildings in Thorpe in the Glebe =

Thorpe in the Glebe is a civil parish in the Rushcliffe district of Nottinghamshire, England. The parish contains four listed buildings that are recorded in the National Heritage List for England. All the listed buildings are designated at Grade II, the lowest of the three grades, which is applied to "buildings of national importance and special interest". There are no settlements in the parish, and the listed buildings consist of three farmhouses and a tomb.

== Buildings ==
Name and location	Photograph	Date	Notes
Church Site Farmhouse; 52.82397°N 1.09968°W		Mid 16th century	The farmhouse has a timber-framed core, it has been enclosed in stone and red brick, and has the remains of quoins, an eaves band and a slate roof. There are two storeys and attics, four bays and a rear wing. The doorway has a reeded surround and a hood, and the windows are casements, some tripartite with segmental heads. The left gable is in red brick with blue brick diapering, it is on a plinth and has dentilled bands. The right gable and the rear wing have a stone ground floor and brick above.
Annabell's Farm; 52.82877°N 1.09160°W		c. 1805	The farmhouse is in red brick with dentilled eaves and a Swithland slate roof. There are two storeys and three bays, and lean-tos. In the centre is a doorway with a moulded surround and a fanlight, and at the rear is a doorway with a segmental head. Most of the windows are sashes, those at the rear horizontally-sliding, and there are also casement windows.
Thorpe Lodge Farmhouse; 52.83336°N 1.08609°W		Early 19th century	The farmhouse is in brick with red stretchers and pink headers, with dogtooth eaves and a tile roof. There are two storeys and attics, and three bays. The central doorway has the remains of a hood, the windows are sashes, and in the attic is a sloping dormer with a lead roof.
Tomb northeast of Annabell's Farmhouse; 52.82897°N 1.09142°W	—	1852	The tomb is to the memory of Thomas Annabell and his wife. It consists of a rectangular chest tomb with brick sides, and a thick slate slab with an inscription.
