= Listed buildings in Wysall =

Wysall is a civil parish in the Rushcliffe district of Nottinghamshire, England. The parish contains five listed buildings that are recorded in the National Heritage List for England. Of these, one is listed at Grade I, the highest of the three grades, and the others are at Grade II, the lowest grade. The parish contains the village of Wysall and the surrounding area. All the listed buildings are in the village, and they consist of a church, three farmhouses and a cottage.

== Key ==
Grade	Criteria
I	Buildings of exceptional interest, sometimes considered to be internationally important
II	Buildings of national importance and special interest

== Buildings ==
Name and location	Photograph	Date	Notes	Grade
Holy Trinity Church; 52.83836°N 1.10447°W		12th century	The church has been altered and extended through the centuries, including a restoration in 1872–73. It is built in stone with some weatherboarding, and has roofs of slate, tile and lead. The church consists of a nave with a clerestory, a south aisle, a south porch, a chancel, and a west steeple. The steeple has a tower with a single stage, buttresses, the remains of gargoyles, an embattled parapet, and a recessed spire with lucarnes. On the west side is an arched window, the south side has a lancet window, the bell openings have two lights, and there is a clock face on the east side.	I
Manor House Farmhouse; 52.83892°N 1.10281°W		Mid 16th century (probable)	The house has been altered and extended through the centuries. There are two storeys and an attic, three gabled bays, the outer bays projecting, rear wings, and a slate roof. The ground floor of the two left bays is in stone, and the upper parts are timber framed. The right bay is wider, the upper floor is jettied, and the windows are casements. The middle bay contains a segmental-arched opening and a doorway with a fanlight, above which is a three-light casement window over quatrefoil timber framing. The left bay has a ground floor in stone with brick above, and it contains three-light windows with segmental heads.	II
Rectory Farmhouse; 52.83992°N 1.10206°W	—	Mid 17th century	The farmhouse is in rendered brick on a stone plinth and has a tile roof. There are two storeys and an attic, and three bays. In the centre is an open gabled porch and a doorway under a segmental arch, and the windows are casements.	II
Manor Farmhouse; 52.83876°N 1.10518°W	—	Late 17th or early 18th century	The farmhouse is in red brick on a stone plinth, with blue brick diapering on the upper floor, a dentilled and raised floor band, and a tile roof with brick coped gables and kneelers. There are two storeys and attics, and four bays. The doorway has a reeded surround and a decorative fanlight. The windows are a mix of sashes, and casements under segmental arches, and at the rear is a gabled stair turret.	II
The Nook; 52.84011°N 1.10194°W		1718	A cottage in red brick, with a floor band in chequered red and blue brick, and a pantile roof. There are two storeys and three bays. The doorway has a moulded surround, and is flanked by casement windows under segmental arches with chequered brickwork. The windows in the upper floor are horizontally-sliding sashes. In the right gable the date is inscribed in blue brick, and the left gable contains a window over which is a Tudor-style hood mould.	II
