= Listed buildings in Kneesall =

Kneesall is a civil parish in the Newark and Sherwood district of Nottinghamshire, England. The parish contains four listed buildings that are recorded in the National Heritage List for England. Of these, one is listed at Grade I, the highest of the three grades, one is at Grade II*, the middle grade, and the others are at Grade II, the lowest grade. The parish contains the village of Kneesall and the surrounding area. The listed buildings are all in the village, and consist of a church, a war memorial in the churchyard, a farmhouse and an estate cottage.

== Key ==
Grade	Criteria
I	Buildings of exceptional interest, sometimes considered to be internationally important
II*	Particularly important buildings of more than special interest
II	Buildings of national importance and special interest

== Buildings ==
Name and location	Photograph	Date	Notes	Grade
St Bartholomew's Church; 53.17029°N 0.94810°W		14th century	The church has been altered and expanded through the centuries, including restorations in the 19th century, the latest by C. Hodgson Fowler in 1893. It is built in stone, and has roofs of concrete and slate, and consists of a nave with a clerestory, north and south aisles, a south porch, a boiler house, a chancel and west tower. The lower has three stages, buttresses, two string courses, an eaves band with traces of angels and animals, a parapet with traceried panels, and corner crocketed pinnacles. On the west side is a doorway with a chamfered surround and a hood mould, over which is a double lancet window and a clock face, and the bell openings have two lights and hood moulds. The east window has five lights and is in Perpendicular style.	I
Old Hall Farm House; 53.17068°N 0.95048°W		c. 1525	A hunting lodge, later a farmhouse, it is in brick, partly rendered, with moulded terracotta dressings, the main roof in slate, and the rear wing with a tile roof. There are two storeys, and an L-shaped plan, with a main range of three bays, and a rear wing. On the front is a doorway with a Tudor arch a moulded terracotta architrave, imposts and a hood mould. The windows throughout are casements, many with mullions, and some with hood moulds.	II*
Old Hall Cottage; 53.17073°N 0.94966°W	—	Early 19th century	An estate cottage in red brick on a plinth, with stone dressings, rebated eaves, and a hipped pantile roof. It consists of a main block with two storeys and three bays, and flanking single-storey single-bay wings. The south front contains a blind window in each floor of the middle bay, flanked by sash windows with segmental heads in the ground floor, and casement windows in the upper floor. In the east front is a doorway and elsewhere there is a mix of sash and casement windows.	II
War memorial 53.17029°N 0.94850°W	—	1920	The war memorial is in the churchyard of St Bartholomew's Church. It is in limestone, and consists of a Celtic cross on a tapered plinth and a single step. On the plinth are inscriptions and the names of those lost in the two World Wars.	II
