= Listed buildings in Syerston =

Syerston is a civil parish in the Newark and Sherwood district of Nottinghamshire, England. The parish contains seven listed buildings that are recorded in the National Heritage List for England. All the listed buildings are designated at Grade II, the lowest of the three grades, which is applied to "buildings of national importance and special interest". The parish contains the village of Syerston and the surrounding area. The listed buildings consist of a country house and associated structures, a smaller house, a farmhouse and a former barn, and a church.

== Buildings ==
Name and location	Photograph	Date	Notes
All Saints' Church; 53.01950°N 0.88851°W		13th century	The church has been altered and extended through the centuries, the porch was added in 1724, and the church was restored in 1895–96]]. It is built in stone with a tile roof, and consists of a nave and a chancel under a continuous roof, a south porch, and a west tower. The tower is the oldest part of the church, and has a single stage, a lancet window and a stair light on the south side, two-light bell openings with hood moulds, and an embattled parapet. The porch has a coped gable with a ridge cross, and a moulded arched entrance, above which is a datestone.
Low Farm House; 53.01756°N 0.88426°W	—	17th century	The farmhouse is in brick, the front in red stretchers and pink headers, with floor bands, dogtooth, dentilled and raised eaves, and a slate roof with brick coped gables and kneelers. There are two storeys and attics, a main range of five bays, and a lower two-storey rear wing with a pantile roof. In the centre is a gabled porch and a doorway with a fanlight. The ground floor windows are sashes, the upper floor contains casements, and all the windows are under segmental arches.
Barn, Low Farm; 53.01764°N 0.88461°W		Early 18th century	The barn, which has been converted for residential use, is in brick, with a raised eaves band, and a pantile roof with brick coped gables and kneelers. There are two storeys and three bays. In the centre is an arched doorway with a keystone converted into a window, and to the left is a stable door with a segmental arched head.
Syerston Hall, outbuilding and wall 53.02353°N 0.89921°W	—	1793–96	A country house in red brick on a plinth, with a floor band, modillion eaves cornices, and hipped slate roofs. There are two storeys and a basement, and a main range of five bays. Projecting from the left is a two-storey single-bay wing, and a recessed two-storey three-bay range, and at the rear is a later wing with two storeys and six bays. On the centre of the main range, steps lead up to a porch with Doric columns, a fluted frieze, a dentilled cornice, a dentilled pediment, and a doorway with a fanlight. The windows on the front are sashes. On the east front is a two-storey polygonal bay window. The outbuilding has a single storey and a pyramidal roof, and the wall contains arched doorways.
Pigeoncote, Syerston Hall; 53.02399°N 0.89926°W	—	c. 1800	The pigeoncote is in red brick on a plinth, with dentilled eaves, and a pyramidal slate roof, surmounted by a glazed lantern with a pyramidal roof and a small ball finial. On each side are two round-arched blind recessed panels with archivolts, and a continuous impost band. On the north side is a doorway under a segmental arch, on the west side is a doorway under a chamfered arch and entrances for birds.
Stable Block, pump and hen house, Syerston Hall; 53.02369°N 0.89993°W	—	c. 1800	The stable block is in red brick on a plinth, with dentilled eaves and a hipped slate roof. There is a single storey and ten bays, the middle two bays projecting slightly under a pedimented gable, and the outer bays also project. The range contains segmental-arched coach doorways, recessed porches, and sash windows. In front of the range is a decorative cast iron water pump, and to the left is a hen house with a single storey and lofts, and nine bays.
Montague House; 53.01878°N 0.88772°W		Late 18th to early 19th century	The house is in rendered brick, on a plinth, with pilaster strips at the corners, a moulded eaves cornice with a low parapet, and a slate roof with stone coped gables. There are two storeys, a main range of three bays, the middle bay projecting slightly, and two-storey rear wings. In the centre is a doorway with reeded pilasters, and a pediment on brackets. The windows are sashes with painted wedge lintels and keystones.
