= Listed buildings in Hodsock =

Hodsock is a civil parish in the Bassetlaw District of Nottinghamshire, England. The parish contains 17 listed buildings that are recorded in the National Heritage List for England. Of these, one is listed at Grade I, the highest of the three grades, and the others are at Grade II, the lowest grade. The parish is almost entirely rural, containing no substantial settlements. The most important building in the parish is a 16th-century gatehouse, which is listed, together with its associated country house. The other listed buildings consist of houses and associated structures, farmhouses and farm buildings, a former watermill, a bridge and a war memorial.

== Key ==
Grade	Criteria
I	Buildings of exceptional interest, sometimes considered to be internationally important
II	Buildings of national importance and special interest

== Buildings ==
Name and location	Photograph	Date	Notes	Grade
Hodsock Priory Gatehouse and Bridge; 53.36247°N 1.08276°W		Early 16th century	The gatehouse is in red brick with stone dressings, blue brick diapering, a Lombard frieze, coped parapets and a tile roof. The east front has three storeys and a basement, three bays flanked by slightly higher square turrets with quoins, and taller embattled octagonal turrets. In the centre is a round-headed archway with a double-chamfered surround. The windows are casement windows with two round-headed lights, and in the turrets are rectangular openings. Attached is a bridge over a dry moat, in brick and stone, with three arches.	I
Goldthorpe Mill; 53.38956°N 1.11777°W		Early 18th century	A watermill, later converted into a house, it is in stone with pantile roofs. The main block has two storeys and attics and four bays, and contains a doorway with a stable door, and a mix of sash and casement windows. To the right is a single-storey three-bay wing with two arches and a doorway with a segmental arch. To the left of the main block is a two-storey two-bay wing and a single-storey single-bay extension, both parts with casement windows. Inside the building is a steel waterwheel and some gear wheels.	II
Hodsock Park House; 53.37714°N 1.10131°W	—	Early 18th century	A stone house, rendered on the front and left side, with a parapet, and a slate roof with stone coped gables. There are two storeys and attics, and four bays, with a coped pediment and finial over the middle two bays. On the front is a gabled porch with a dentilled pediment on brackets. Each outer bay contains a two-storey canted bay window, and the other windows are sashes. At the rear are lean-to extensions.	II
Roundhouse, Forest Lodge; 53.36230°N 1.05834°W	—	Late 18th century	A lodge, converted into a gardener's cottage around 1936, in red brick with a tile roof. There is a single storey and an attic, and an octagonal plan, with a projecting rectangular porch on the west. In the east front is a blocked doorway, the windows are casements, and in the roof are four tile-hung dormers.	II
Goldthorpe Farmhouse; 53.38446°N 1.11213°W	—	Late 18th century	The farmhouse is in stone on a plinth, and has a slate roof. There are two storeys and attics, and three bays, and a recessed two-storey wing to the left. The central doorway has a fanlight, and the windows are sashes with quoined surrounds and keystones. In the wing are doorways, and a mix of sash and casement windows, some with segmental heads.	II
Barn, Goldthorpe Farm; 53.38422°N 1.11187°W	—	Late 18th century	A stone barn on a plinth with a pantile roof. There are two storeys and five bays, and recessed on the left is a lower two-storey wing with a hipped roof. In the centre of the main part is a tall archway with impost blocks and a keystone. Elsewhere there are doorways, some blocked, and windows.	II
Hodsock Grange Farmhouse, link walls and outbuildings 53.37443°N 1.11851°W	—	Late 18th century	The farmhouse is in stone on a plinth, and has a slate roof with stone coped gables with kneelers. There are two storeys and attics, and a front of three bays, with an arcade of three arches each with an archivolt and a keystone and an impost band. In the centre is a porch with a pediment, and the windows are sashes. The house is flanked by link walls ending in outbuildings with pyramidal pantile roofs.	II
Enclosure and outbuildings, Hodsock Grange; 53.37480°N 1.11839°W	—	Late 18th century	The outbuildings are in stone on a plinth, with pantile roofs, and, with walls, form three ranges round a courtyard. The west range has nine bays, and has a central arch with voussoirs, a keystone, and imposts extending into a band, above which is a moulded cornice. The ends are higher with pyramidal roofs. There are similar arches in the north and east ranges.	II
Hodsock Manor Farm; 53.35382°N 1.06590°W	—	Late 18th century	The farmhouse is in red brick on a stone plinth, with a dentilled band, dogtooth eaves and a hipped tile roof. There are two storeys and three bays, the middle bay projecting. In the centre is a two-storey arched panel containing a tripartite sash window and other windows. The angle to the right contains a porch with a slate roof, and elsewhere are sash windows, some horizontally-sliding. To the left is a lean-to with one storey and an attic, containing a casement window and a fixed window, both with segmental arches.	II
Bridge; 53.36595°N 1.06812°W		Early 19th century	The bridge carries a road over the River Ryton. It is in stone, and consists of two arches with a central cutwater. The parapet has chamfered coping, and there is a retaining wall to the southeast.	II
Dovecot Cottage; 53.37019°N 1.10708°W		Early 19th century	A pigeoncote converted into a cottage, it is in stone on a plinth, with dogtooth eaves and a pyramidal slate roof with a weathervane. There are three storeys and a single bay, recessed to the right is a two-storey two-bay wing, and further recessed to the right is a wing with a single storey and attics and a single bay. Most of the windows are casements, some with quoined surrounds, the gables have decorative bargeboards, and in an angle is an open porch.	II
Hodsock Woodhouse; 53.37016°N 1.10818°W	—	Early 19th century	A house in red brick with floor bands, an eaves band, and a hipped pantile roof. There are two storeys and attics, three bays, and rear extensions with one and two storeys. In the centre is a doorway, and the windows are sashes with splayed brick lintels and keystones.	II
Hodsock Priory; 53.36221°N 1.08271°W		1829	A country house, which was extended in 1873–76 by George Devey, is in red brick on a plinth, with stone dressings, blue brick diapering, a Lombard frieze, a coped parapet, and tile roofs with brick coped gables, kneelers and finials. The north front has two storeys and six bays, and a porch with a coped shaped parapet, an arched doorway with a quoined surround, carved spandrels and a hood mould. Most of the windows are cross casements, and there are gabled half-dormers. The south front has five bays, and contains a doorway with a Tudor arch and a quoined surround, and sash windows.	II
Forest Lodge; 53.35958°N 1.05972°W	—	c. 1936	A country house in red brick with tile roofs. It has two storeys and a butterfly plan, consisting of a central core with a concave front, from which wings extend at right angles to the north and the west, and there is a long single-storey kitchen extension to the east. The ends of the main wings are bowed, and the east end of the south front has a conical roof. Most of the windows throughout are casements.	II
Gatehouse, Forest Lodge; 53.36146°N 1.06389°W		c. 1936	The former lodge is in red brick with a tile roof. There is a single storey and an attic, and an oblong octagon plan. The windows are casements with two or three lights, and on the east and west slopes of the roof are tile-hung dormers. To the south is a single-storey covered yard, and at the end is a store with a hipped roof.	II
Woodhouse, Forest Lodge; 53.36013°N 1.06171°W	—	c. 1936	A chauffeur's house and garage, later a private house, it is in red brick with tile roofs. There is a single storey and attics, and a butterfly plan, consisting of a central core and two wings projecting at right angles to the northeast and the northwest. The windows are casements, and in the roof are four tile-hung dormers.	II
Langold War Memorial; 53.37825°N 1.11862°W		1949	The war memorial consists of a square slightly tapering plinth in grey Westmorland granite, on which is a two-stage moulded base for a sundial. On the plinth is a gold-lettered inscription, and the names of those lost in the Second World War.	II
