= Listed buildings in Staunton, Nottinghamshire =

Staunton is a civil parish in the Newark and Sherwood district of Nottinghamshire, England. The parish contains eleven listed buildings that are recorded in the National Heritage List for England. Of these, two are listed at Grade II*, the middle of the three grades, and the others are at Grade II, the lowest grade. The parish contains the village of Staunton and the surrounding countryside. The listed buildings consist of a church, a country house and associated structures, a pigeoncote, a farmhouse, a cottage, a public house and a telephone kiosk.

== Key ==
Grade	Criteria
II*	Particularly important buildings of more than special interest
II	Buildings of national importance and special interest

== Buildings ==
Name and location	Photograph	Date	Notes	Grade
St Mary's Church; 52.98080°N 0.80212°W		14th century	The church has been altered and extended through the centuries. The oldest part is the tower, and most of the rest of the church was rebuilt in 1854 by E. J. Willson. It is in stone with slate roofs, and consists of a nave, a north aisle, a south porch, a chancel, a north vestry, and a tower at the east end of the aisle. The tower, which is partly rendered, has two stages, angle buttresses, the bell openings have two lights, transoms and hood moulds, and above them is a corbel table with gargoyles, a plain parapet and a recessed tiled pyramidal spire. At the west end are buttresses rising to crocketed pinnacles.	II*
Staunton Hall and service wing 52.98029°N 0.80156°W		16th century	A country house that was altered and extended in about 1778–80 by John Carr. It is in stone and brick, partly rendered, with a hipped slate roof and two storeys. The outer bays of the entrance front project and are canted, and on the front is a two-storey porch with a coped gable. It contains a Tudor arched doorway over which is a hood mould, and a plaque on five corbels, carved with a coat of arms, and with a decorated surround and a hood mould. The windows in the outer bays are sashes, and the other windows on the front are mullioned and transomed. The garden front has ten bays, the outer bays projecting and square. The middle three bays project and are canted, with steps leading up to a central doorway that has a moulded surround and a hood on moulded brackets. The windows on this front are sashes, some under segmental arches and with keystones. To the east is a single-storey red brick extension with a hipped roof.	II*
Garage, Staunton Hall; 52.98108°N 0.80143°W		1655	A cottage, later used for other purposes, on a plinth, in stone, with an eaves band and a tile roof, the west gable coped and with a kneeler. There is a single storey and three bays. In the centre is an arched blocked doorway with a hood mould, above which is a plaque with a shield and the date. It is flanked on each side by a flat-headed window with a mullion and a hood mould, over which is a plaque with two blank shields and blind cusping. To the west is a single-bay rendered extension with a pantile roof.	II
Pigeoncote, Staunton Grange; 52.99659°N 0.81102°W	—	Early 18th century	The pigeoncote is in red brick, with a floor band, and a tile roof with brick coped gables. There are two storeys and a loft, a doorway on the west, and windows on the west and east. In the upper parts are 16 bands of perches, and on the south side is a row of pigeonholes. To the east is a single-storey extension.	II
Folly Hill Cottage; 52.98273°N 0.77760°W	—	Mid 18th century	The cottage is in red brick, with dentilled eaves and pantiles roofs, the left gable, raised, coped and tumbled. There is a single storey and attics, and a main range of four bays, to the right is a two-storey extension with a pyramidal roof, and recessed on the right is a single-storey outbuilding. The windows are a mix, and consist of casements, sashes, some horizontally-sliding, fixed lights, and a sloping dormer.	II
Charlton Farmhouse; 52.98595°N 0.80129°W	—	Late 18th century	The farmhouse is in painted brick, with dentilled eaves, and a pantile roof with a coped gable on the south. There are two storeys and attics, and a main range of three bays. In the centre is a blank doorway, and the windows are horizontally-sliding sashes. To the north is a recessed two-storey extension, to the south is a porch, and at the rear is a two-storey three-bay cross wing in painted stone and brick.	II
Gate piers and urns, Staunton Hall; 52.98257°N 0.80176°W		Late 18th century	The gate piers and the urns surmounting them are in stone. The gate piers are coped, and the urns have acanthus decoration.	II
Wall with urn and orb, Staunton Hall; 52.98095°N 0.80162°W		Late 18th century	The wall is in stone and brick, with a coped brick pier to the north, surmounted by a stone orb. At the south corner is a stone urn with acanthus decoration, on a stone base.	II
Staunton Arms Public House; 52.98457°N 0.80087°W		Early 19th century	The public house is in brick on a plinth, with stone dressings, a floor band, an eaves band and a glazed pantile roof. There are two storeys and four bays, to the east and recessed is a single-storey wing, and there is a three-bay rear wing. The windows are sashes, and some are blank.	II
Staunton Hall Lodge; 52.98259°N 0.80162°W		c. 1830	The lodge is in yellow brick, and has a slate roof with projecting eaves. There is a single storey and an attic, and three bays. The middle bay projects, it is gabled, and contains a porch with an arched entrance, above which is a decorated stone shield. The windows are mullioned casements with arched lights and hood moulds.	II
Telephone kiosk 52.98455°N 0.80114°W		1935	The K6 type telephone kiosk outside the Staunton Arms was designed by Giles Gilbert Scott. Constructed in cast iron with a square plan and a dome, it has three unperforated crowns in the top panels.	II
