= Listed buildings in Warsop =

Warsop is a civil parish in the Mansfield District of Nottinghamshire, England. The parish contains 28 listed buildings that are recorded in the National Heritage List for England. Of these, two are listed at Grade I, the highest of the three grades, one is at Grade II*, the middle grade, and the others are at Grade II, the lowest grade. The parish contains the town of Warsop, the settlements of Church Warsop and Sookholme, and the surrounding countryside. Most of the listed buildings are houses, cottages and associated structures, farmhouses and farm buildings. The other listed buildings include two churches with associated structures, a parish centre converted from an old courtyard house, a public house, a bridge and a weir, a watermill, a windmill, and a war memorial.

== Key ==
Grade	Criteria
I	Buildings of exceptional interest, sometimes considered to be internationally important
II*	Particularly important buildings of more than special interest
II	Buildings of national importance and special interest

== Buildings ==
Name and location	Photograph	Date	Notes	Grade
St Peter and St Paul's Church, Church Warsop; 53.21327°N 1.15122°W		11th century	The church has been altered and extended through the centuries, including a restoration and alterations in 1877–78. The church is built in stone with slate roofs, and consists of a nave with a clerestory, north and south aisles, a south porch, a chancel, an organ chamber, a vestry and a west tower. The tower has three stages, buttresses, a string course, gargoyles, and a moulded embattled parapet with four crocketed pinnacles. On the west side is a round-headed doorway and round-headed widows, and above are clock faces on two sides, and two-light bell openings.	I
St Augustine's Church, Sookholme; 53.19646°N 1.18067°W		Early 12th century	A small church that has been altered through the centuries, with buttresses, and a tile roof with coped gables. It consists of a nave with two bays, and a lower single-bay chancel. The west doorway has a shouldered arch, and at the east end is a round-headed window flanked by similar windows at a lower level.	I
Warsop Parish Centre; 53.21352°N 1.15172°W		14th century (or earlier)	Originally Warsop Old Hall, a courtyard house, later a farmhouse, and converted into a parish centre in 1971–73. The building is in stone and has pantile roofs with coped gables and kneelers. There are two storeys and attics, and a C-shaped plan, consisting of a north range, which was a barn, a long east range, and a south range. Most of the windows are casements, some with mullions, and there is a French window, a canted bay window with an embattled parapet, and two flat-roofed dormers. On the west front are external wooden stairs.	II*
Barn, cottage and outbuilding, Moorfield Farm; 53.21401°N 1.15140°W		Early 17th century	The barn with an integral cottage and the adjoining outbuilding are in stone and brick, and the roofs are in pantile and corrugated sheet. There are in a single storey, and in two storeys with attics, and form an L-shaped plan with ranges of five and four bays. Most of the windows are casements, some with mullions, and in the cottage are horizontal-sliding sashes. Other openings include barn doors, vents, and a hatch with a segmental head.	II
Headstones south of the tower, St Peter and St Paul's Church, Church Warsop; 53.21321°N 1.15142°W	—	17th century	The three headstones adjoin the south of the tower. The middle one is in slate and is dated 1754, to the left is a stone with a segmental head dated 1681, and to the right is a stone with chamfered corners dated 1649.	II
29 High Street, Market Warsop; 53.20413°N 1.15398°W		Late 17th century	A public house, at one time a house and a shop, in sandstone with slate roofs. There are two storeys and attics, the front with one bay and a gable with stone coping and kneelers. In the ground floor is a shop front, and above are three-light sash windows. Recessed on the left is a two-storey wing with three-light mullioned windows. At the rear is a round-headed stair window with a keystone, and a stone water trough.	II
24 Manor Road, Church Worsop; 53.21385°N 1.14351°W		c. 1709	A small stone farmhouse that has a pantile roof with stone slate verges and coped gables with kneelers. There are two storeys and an L-shaped plan, with two bays and a rear outshut. The windows are horizontally-sliding sashes, at the rear is a timber porch, and the openings have segmental heads.	II
Stable with loft, 24 Manor Road, Church Worsop; 53.21390°N 1.14372°W		c. 1709	The stable is in stone, and has a pantile roof with stone slate verges and coped gables with kneelers. There are two storeys and two bays, and a lean-to. On the front are two doorways with segmental heads, and in the northeast gable is a square hatch.	II
6 and 6A Church Street, Market Warsop; 53.20603°N 1.15281°W		Early 18th century	A house, at one time a shop, in stone, with a pantile roof and coped gables with kneelers. There are two storeys and three bays. On the front is a gabled porch, to its left is a canted bay window, and the other windows are casements.	II
16 Church Street, Market Warsop, and malthouse 53.20620°N 1.15278°W		Early 18th century	The house and former malthouse are in stone and have a pantile roof with a single coped gable and kneelers. They have two and three storeys and attics and an L-shaped plan, with ranges of four and five bays. The windows on the front are mullioned casements, and elsewhere are casement windows of varying sizes. The boundary wall is in stone with half-round coping, and it extends for 60 metres (200 ft).	II
18 Church Street, Market Warsop; 53.20632°N 1.15268°W		Early 18th century	The house is in stone, partly rendered, and has a pantile roof with a single coped gable with kneelers. There are two storeys and four bays, a lower two-storey extension to the east, and a lean-to, a garage and a two-storey extension to the north. The windows are casements, and on the front is a doorway converted into a window.	II
1 Manor Road, Church Worsop; 53.21384°N 1.14621°W		Early 18th century	A house and a barn converted for residential use in a continuous range. The building is in stone, and has a pantile roof with stone slate verges and coped gables with kneelers. There are two storeys and five bays, and a rear lean-to. The former barn contains various openings, and in the house are casement windows, two with segmental heads.	II
1-3 Blankley's Yard, Church Worsop; 53.21255°N 1.14993°W		Early 18th century	A row of three stone cottages with a pantile roof, and a single coped gable with kneelers. There are two storeys, six bays, and a rear lean-to. The windows on the front are casements, and at the rear are two horizontally-sliding sash windows.	II
Old Mill House; 53.21231°N 1.15021°W		Early 18th century	A stone house with a pantile roof, it has two storeys and attics, three bays, and a recessed single-storey three-bay extension on the left. In an angle is a doorway with a bracketed hood, most of the windows are casements, and there is a gabled dormer.	II
Hall Farmhouse; 53.19609°N 1.18217°W	—	c.1745	The farmhouse is in stone, with quoins, and a roof of pantile and some tile, with stone slate verges and coped gables and kneelers. There are two storeys and attics and an L-shaped plan, with a main range of three bays, and to the left is a two-storey single-bay service wing. On the front is a round-headed doorway, and to its right is a gabled porch containing a doorway with a chamfered surround and a fanlight. Most of the windows are casements with mullions, those in the ground floor with segmental heads, and one in the upper floor with an elliptical head. On the front is an initialled datestone with a segmental head.	II
Manor Farmhouse and wall 53.21348°N 1.14607°W		Mid 18th century	The farmhouse is in stone on a partial plinth, with deep eaves, and a pantile roof with stone slate verges. There are two storeys and attics, and fronts of three and four bays. The doorway has an architrave and a fanlight, and the windows are a mix of casements, and sashes, some horizontally-sliding. On the north and south sides of the garden is a stone boundary wall with half-round coping containing an elaborate cast iron gate.	II
Mill Farmhouse, farm buildings and wall 53.19741°N 1.17912°W		Mid 18th century	The farmhouse and farm buildings are in stone, and have pantile roofs with stone slate verges, coped gables and kneelers. The windows are casements, some with mullions. The house has two storeys and three bays, and the farm buildings are on three sides of a yard, three bays deep and seven bays wide, with a single-storey link to the house. The buildings consist of barns and stables with one or two storeys, and hey contain a variety of openings with differently shaped heads. The boundary wall is in stone with half-round coping.	II
Farm buildings east of Old Mill House; 53.21232°N 1.14984°W		Mid 18th century	A barn with flanking buildings in stone with a pantile roof and stone slate verges. The barn has two storeys and five bays, and it contains three elliptical-headed openings, doors and casement windows with segmental heads, and a square hatch. The flanking buildings have a single storey and two bays.	II
Mill Bridge and weir 53.21126°N 1.14991°W		1767	The bridge carries Church Road (A60 road) over the River Meden. It is in stone with saddleback coping, and has a string course. There is a central segmental arch, to the left is a single opening and to the right are four unequally spaced openings, all with segmental heads. Above, in the centre, is a balustrade with vase-shaped balusters, and the flanking walls contain six square piers with concave domed caps. The weir to the south has concrete coping.	II
Warsop Mill; 53.21143°N 1.14986°W		1767	The watermill, which was extended at both ends in the 19th century, is in stone, the original part with a string course, floor band, dentilled eaves cornice, and the mill has a pantile roof. There are two storeys and attics and six bays, and later lean-tos at the rear. The doorway in the original part and the windows, which are mullioned casements, have rock faced architraves, and the later windows are iron casements. In the left bay is a round-headed wheel opening, and in the attics of the gable ends are lunette windows.	II
Headstones west of the tower, St Peter and St Paul's Church, Church Warsop; 53.21325°N 1.15154°W	—	18th century	The four headstones to the west of the tower are in stone. From the left there is a moulded double stone with a scrolled head, a winged hourglass and a winged serpent dated 1725, a scrolled stone dated 1713, a moulded arch-headed stone dated 1724, and a panelled arch-headed double stone dated 1750 with a verse.	II
41 High Street, Market Warsop; 53.20366°N 1.15474°W		Late 18th century	A stone house with quoins, and a tile roof with kneelers. There are two storeys and attics, three bays, and a square plan. The central doorway has a plain surround and a hood on curved brackets, and the windows are cross casements with splayed lintels.	II
Nettleworth Farmhouse, stable block and wall 53.18852°N 1.17685°W		Late 18th century (probable)	The farmhouse and stable block are in stone on a plinth, and have pantile roofs with stone slate verges. The farmhouse has two storeys and attics and an L-shaped plan, with a main range of three bays and single-storey extensions. The doorway has a hood with curved brackets, and the windows are a mix of sashes and casements. To the left is the stable block, with a single storey and five bays. The stone boundary wall has ramped stone coping, and contains two chamfered rusticated gate piers with concave domed tops.	II
Barn and farm buildings, Hall Farm; 53.19601°N 1.18242°W		Early 19th century	The buildings are in stone with rebated brick eaves, roofs of pantile and slate, and casement windows. The barn has three bays, and contains barn doors, windows with segmental heads and vents. To the south is a twelve-bay cow shed, and to the north is a stable in one and two storeys, with seven bays, and two lean-to extensions.	II
Warsop windmill 53.19059°N 1.12981°W		Early 19th century	The windmill, which has been restored, is in stone, the upper part is in brick, and it is surmounted by an onion cap. The windmill consists of a tapering round tower with three stages. In the ground floor is a doorway, and the windows are casements.	II
Wall, gates, piers and overthrow, St Peter and St Paul's Church, Church Warsop; 53.21244°N 1.15051°W		Mid 19th century	The wall enclosing the churchyard is in stone with gabled coping, forming an L-shaped plan with a rounded corner. To the south is an entrance with panelled stone piers and hipped caps, iron spearhead gates, and a scrolled foliate wrought iron overthrow with a lamp bracket. To the north are similar piers and later gates.	II
Park Hall Stables; 53.18247°N 1.18718°W	—	1867	The stable block, later used for other purposes, is in stone on a chamfered plinth, with a floor band, moulded eaves, and a Westmorland slate roof with coped gables and kneelers. The windows are casements, some are cross windows with mullions. The building forms a C-shaped plan, the central block with two storeys and three bays, the middle bay projecting under a gable containing a clock. This contains a Tudor arched carriage entrance, above which is a three-light window and an initialled datestone. The outer wings project forward and have a single storey and three bays. The south wing contains three blocked carriage openings with four-centred arched heads.	II
War memorial 53.21225°N 1.15056°W		c. 1920	The war memorial stands in an enclosure by the roadside, and is in limestone. It consists of a square panelled pillar with a pilastered panelled frieze, a cornice, and a pyramidal cap. This stands on a moulded square pedestal, on a square plinth of two steps. On the north and south sides are granite panels with the names of those lost in the First World War, and on the east side is a panel with an inscription and the names of those lost in the Second World War, above which is a sword carved in relief.	II
