= Listed buildings in Grassthorpe =

Grassthorpe is a civil parish in the Newark and Sherwood district of Nottinghamshire, England. The parish contains five listed buildings that are recorded in the National Heritage List for England. All the listed buildings are designated at Grade II, the lowest of the three grades, which is applied to "buildings of national importance and special interest". The parish contains the village of Grassthorpe and the surrounding countryside. The listed buildings consist of a house, a cottage, a pigeoncote, a footbridge and a pinfold.

== Buildings ==
Name and location	Photograph	Date	Notes
Snowdrop Cottage; 53.20026°N 0.80880°W	—	17th century	A house with a timber-framed core with brick nogging, partly encased in brick, and has a pantile roof with a plain tile verge. There are two storeys and an L-shaped plan, with a front range of three bays, and a rear wing on the east. On the front is a gabled porch, horizontally-sliding sash windows and three gabled dormers. Elsewhere, there are casement windows, and all the windows have segmental heads. Inside the house is exposed timber framing.
Pigeoncote, The Manor House; 53.20152°N 0.81125°W	—	Late 17th century	The pigeoncote and attached stable are in brick, with plain and dentilled eaves, and a pantile roof with three stepped coped gables and kneelers. In the centre are two storeys and two bays, flanked by single-storey single bay wings. The pigeoncote contains two tiers of pigeonholes, and the other openings, including doorways, have segmental heads.
The Manor House and wall 53.20135°N 0.81093°W		1697	The house is in colourwashed brick with a floor band, an eaves band and a slate roof. There are two storeys and an L-shaped plan, with a symmetrical front range of five bays, and a wing and a lean-to at the rear. In the centre is a doorway with a fanlight, the windows on the front are sashes, and elsewhere there are casement windows. On a chimney is an initialled datestone. The boundary wall is in brick with a stepped plinth and triangular brick coping, and is 5 metres (16 ft) long.
Footbridge; 53.19668°N 0.78148°W		Late 18th century	The footbridge carries the towpath of the Trent Navigation over Grassthorpe Beck. It is in stone and has a rectangular opening. There is a chamfered plinth course, and a low dressed parapet with rounded coping.
Pinfold; 53.20053°N 0.81093°W		19th century	The pinfold is in brick with brick coping. It has a square plan, and a rounded corner on the southeast, and it contains two square brick piers with dressed stone caps, and an inscribed dated stone.
