= Listed buildings in Gamston, Bassetlaw =

Gamston is a civil parish in the Bassetlaw District of Nottinghamshire, England. It contains five listed buildings that are recorded in the National Heritage List for England. Of these, one is listed at Grade I, the highest of the three grades, and the others are at Grade II, the lowest grade. The parish contains the village of Gamston and the surrounding countryside. All the listed buildings are in the village, and consist of a church, a rectory later used as a school, houses and a cottage.

== Key ==
Grade	Criteria
I	Buildings of exceptional interest, sometimes considered to be internationally important
II	Buildings of national importance and special interest

== Buildings ==
Name and location	Photograph	Date	Notes	Grade
St Peter's Church; 53.27651°N 0.93861°W		13th century	The church has been altered and extended through the centuries, including a restoration in 1855 by George Gilbert Scott. It is built in stone, and consists of a nave with a clerestory, a south aisle, a north porch, a north rood stair turret, a chancel and a west tower. The tower has four stages, angle buttresses rising to diagonal buttresses, a deep chamfered plinth over which is a moulded band, further bands above, two gargoyles on each side, an embattled parapet, and eight pinnacles with blind tracery and crocketed finials. On the west side is a doorway with a pointed arch and a hood mould, stair lights, and two-light bell openings. The body of the church is also embattled.	I
Gamston Manor and cottage 53.27833°N 0.93765°W	—	17th century	The house, which was later extended, is in red brick with some stone in the ground floor, and a slate roof. There are two storeys and attics, and six bays, the left bay gabled. On the front is a pedimented Doric porch and a doorway with a fanlight, and to its right are two large casement windows, between which is a corbel carved with a human head. Elsewhere, there is a mix of casement and sash windows, an oriel window and French windows, and there is a single roof dormer. To the right and recessed is a lean-to, and attached at the rear is an 18th-century cottage.	II
Corner Cottage; 53.27658°N 0.93796°W		c. 1700	The cottage is timber framed with brick nogging, it is rendered and colourwashed, on a stone plinth, with a hipped pantile roof. There are two storeys and four bays. On the front is a lean-to porch, most of the windows are casements, and there is a horizontally-sliding sash window and a sloping dormer. To the left is a lean-to extension, and inside there is exposed timber framing.	II
Bramcote School; 53.28007°N 0.93598°W	—	Mid 18th century	Originally a rectory, later a school, it is in red brick on a plinth, with a floor band, dentilled eaves, and a tile roof. There are two storeys and attics, and six bays, the right bay projecting slightly and gabled. The windows in the ground floor are casements, in the upper floor they are sashes and in the attic is a casement window; all the windows have wedge lintels.	II
Brewery House; 53.28017°N 0.94036°W	—	Late 18th century	A house in red brick with dentilled eaves and a pantile roof. There are two storeys and five bays, and rear wings. The segmental-arched doorway has a fanlight, and is flanked by canted bay windows. The other windows are sash windows, the window in the ground floor with a segmental arch.	II
