= Listed buildings in Scaftworth =

Civil Parish in Nottinghamshire, England

Scaftworth is a civil parish in the Bassetlaw District of Nottinghamshire, England. The parish contains three listed buildings that are recorded in the National Heritage List for England. All the listed buildings are designated at Grade II, the lowest of the three grades, which is applied to "buildings of national importance and special interest". The parish contains the hamlet of Scaftworth and the surrounding countryside, and the listed buildings consist of a house, a barn and a road bridge.

== Buildings ==
Name and location	Photograph	Date	Notes
Scaftworth Hall; 53.41728°N 0.99874°W		Early 18th century	The house is in whitewashed rendered brick with hipped slate roofs. There are two storeys and six bays, three bays projecting under a coped pediment and on a plinth. The doorway has a hood on brackets, to its left is a canted bay window, the other windows are sashes, and in the pediment is a blocked oeil-de-boeuf flanked by carved heads and a garland. To the right is a lower two-storey two-bay wing.
Barn, Scaftworth Hall; 53.41758°N 0.99898°W	—	Early 18th century	The barn is in brick and stone, with dentilled eaves, and a pantile roof with a stone coped left gable. There are two storeys and three bays. In the centre is a full-height blocked arch with a keystone containing a single-storey arch. This is flanked by pilasters and horizontally-sliding sash windows, with blocked openings under segmental arches above. The left gable has a plinth and quoins, the dentilled eaves and cornice forming a pediment.
Bawtry Bridge; 53.42678°N 1.01440°W		Early 19th century	The bridge, which was widened in 1940, carries Gainsborough Road (A631 road) over the River Idle. It is in stone, and consists of three rusticated arches with keystones. The cutwaters rise to coped piers, the parapet is also coped, and it ends in coped piers on triangular bases.
