= Listed buildings in Bathley =

Bathley is a civil parish in the Newark and Sherwood district of Nottinghamshire, England. The parish contains five listed buildings that are recorded in the National Heritage List for England. All the listed buildings are designated at Grade II, the lowest of the three grades, which is applied to "buildings of national importance and special interest". The parish contains the village of Bathley and the surrounding countryside, and the listed buildings consist of houses, farmhouses and a farm building.

== Buildings ==
Name and location	Photograph	Date	Notes
The Hollies; 53.12375°N 0.84141°W		13th century	The house has a timber framed core with crucks. The external walls are in whitewashed brick on a rendered plinth, with dentilled eaves and a gabled and hipped pantile roof. There are two storeys and attics, and an L-shaped plan, consisting of a front of four bays, the left bay projecting as a wing, and various lean-tos. The windows are a mix of casements and sashes.
Grange Farm House; 53.12356°N 0.83723°W		16th century	Originally a grange of Dale Abbey, it was extended in the 19th century. The farmhouse is in stone and brick, partly rendered and whitewashed, with dentilled eaves, and a pantile roof with coped gables and kneelers. There are two storeys and four bays, the left bay later and lower, and the right bay projecting. The porch is in a lean-to on the right, the windows are casements, and in the roof are three gabled dormers.
Bathley Hill Farmhouse; 53.13201°N 0.85299°W	—	Late 18th century	The farmhouse is in brick on a plinth, with a floor band, dentilled eaves, and pantile roofs, partly hipped and partly with coped gables. There are two storeys and attics, and an L-shaped plan, consisting of a main range of three bays, with a lean-to wing on the left. In the centre is a recessed doorway with a segmental head and a fanlight. The windows are casements, some with a segmental head. In the adjoining outbuilding is a horizontally-sliding sash window.
Manor Farm House and wall 53.12701°N 0.83971°W	—	c. 1811–18	The farmhouse is in brick on a stone plinth, with a floor band, dentilled eaves, and a pantile roof. There are two storeys and attics, and an L-shaped plan with a front of three bays. The doorway has a rubbed brick head with a keystone, and the windows are sashes, those in the ground floor with segmental heads. Adjoining the house is a ramped brick wall with half-round and shaped copings, containing a pair of gate piers with dressed stone caps.
Stable, Bathley Hill Farm; 53.13222°N 0.85323°W	—	19th century	The stable is in brick, with dentilled eaves, and a pantile roof with coped gables. There are two storeys and three bays. On the southwest front are four stable doors alternating with round windows. The doorways and windows have segmental heads.
