= South Clifton =

Village and civil parish in Nottinghamshire, England

Coordinates: 53.223148°N 0.77055573°W

- Village and civil parish
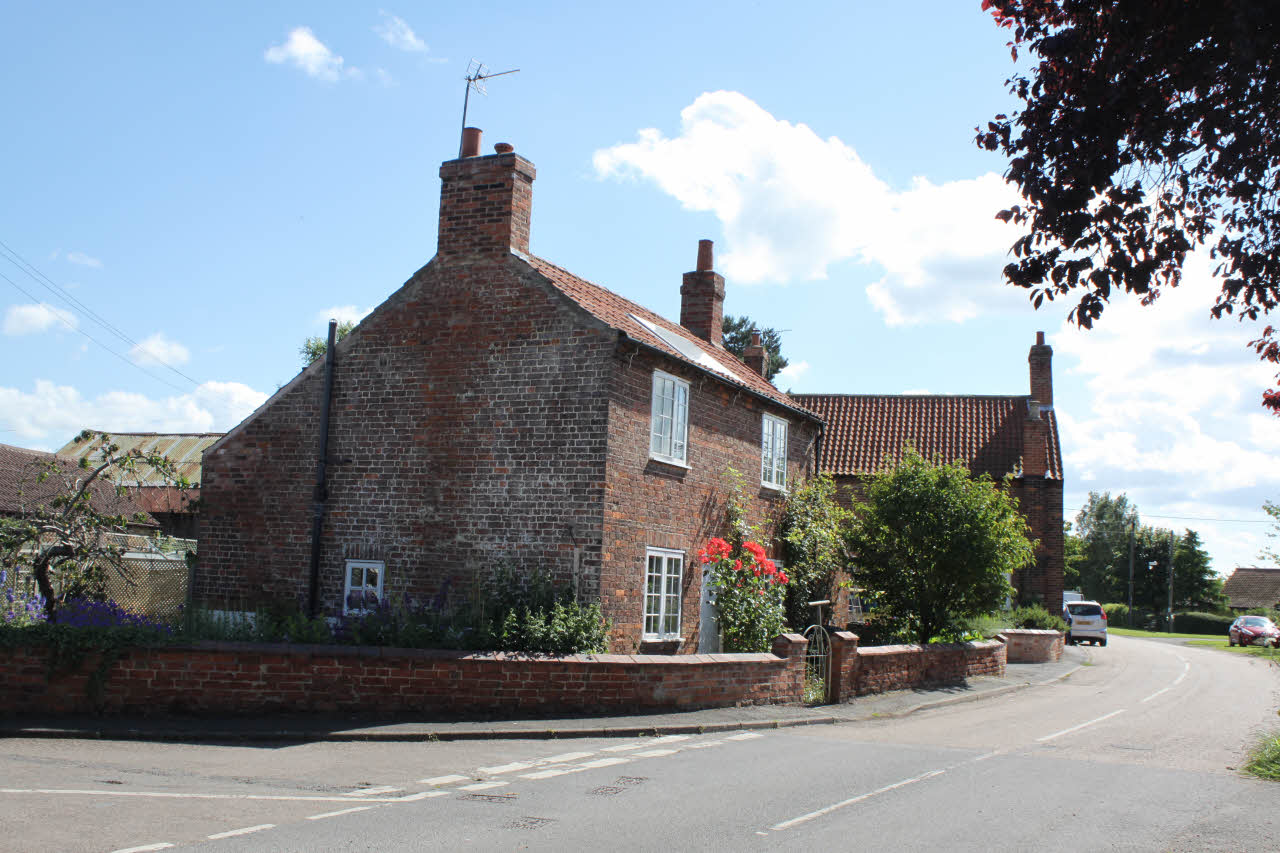
- Vicarage Road

- Location within Nottinghamshire
- Interactive map of South Clifton
- Area: 2.06 sq mi (5.3 km^{2})
- Population: 308 (2021)
  - Density: 150/sq mi (58/km^{2})
- OS grid reference: SK 821702
  - London: 120 mi (190 km) SSE
- District: Newark and Sherwood
- Shire county: Nottinghamshire
- Region: East Midlands
- Country: England
- Sovereign state: United Kingdom
- Post town: NEWARK
- Postcode district: NG23
- Dialling code: 01522
- Police: Nottinghamshire
- Fire: Nottinghamshire
- Ambulance: East Midlands
- UK Parliament: Newark
- Website: www.south-clifton.co.uk

South Clifton is a village and civil parish in the Newark and Sherwood district of Nottinghamshire, England. It is 11 miles north of Newark-on-Trent. With the 2011 census, the parish had a population of 326, this fell to 308 at the 2021 census. The parish touches Thorney, Girton, Fledborough, Wigsley, Marnham, Normanton on Trent, Spalford and North Clifton.

== Features ==
There are 8 listed buildings in South Clifton.

== History ==
The name "Clifton" means 'Cliff farm/settlement'. North and South Clifton were recorded in the Domesday Book as Cliftone/Cliftune/Cli(s)tone. South Clifton was a township in the parish of North Clifton, it became a separate parish in 1866. On the 25th of March 1885 an area of Marnham parish was transferred to the parish.

== See also ==
- St George the Martyr's Church, North & South Clifton
