= Holy Trinity Church, Besthorpe =

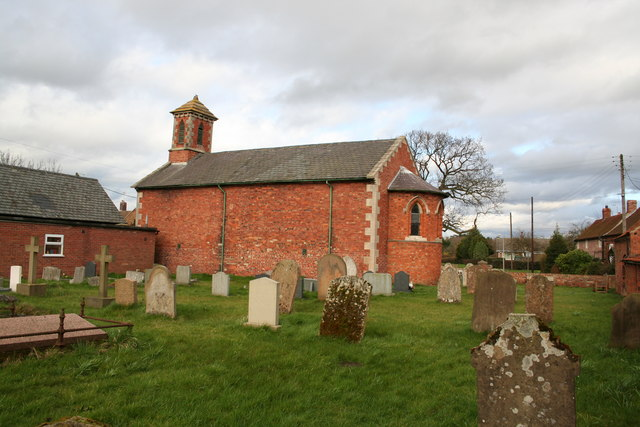
- Holy Trinity Church, Besthorpe
- Holy Trinity Church, Besthorpe
- 53°10′16.42″N 0°46′2.13″W
- OS grid reference: SK 82566 64736
- Location: Besthorpe
- Country: England
- Denomination: Church of England

History
- Dedication: Holy Trinity

Architecture
- Heritage designation: Grade II listed
- Completed: 1844

Administration
- Diocese: Diocese of Southwell and Nottingham
- Archdeaconry: Newark
- Deanery: Newark and Southwell
- Parish: Langford

Holy Trinity Church, Besthorpe is a Grade II listed parish church in the Church of England in Besthorpe, Nottinghamshire.

== History ==
The church was built in 1844 as a chapel of ease to St Helena's Church, South Scarle.

It is part of a group of parishes which includes:

- St Bartholomew's Church, Langford
- St Giles' Church, Holme
- St Cecilia's Church, Girton
- All Saints' Church, Harby
- St George the Martyr's Church, North & South Clifton
- All Saints' Church, Collingham
- St John the Baptist's Church, Collingham
- St Helena's Church, South Scarle
- St Helen's Church, Thorney
- All Saints' Church, Winthorpe

== See also ==
- Listed buildings in Besthorpe, Nottinghamshire
