= James Courtes Lavers =

British clergyman

James Walter Courtes Lavers was Archdeacon of the Seychelles from 1925 to 1931.

Lavers was educated at King's College London and Lincoln Theological College; and ordained in 1905. After curacies in Greenwich, South Scarle and Brampton he was Chaplain at Mahé before his time as Archdeacon and the incumbent at Denton, Norfolk afterwards.
