= St Helena's Church, South Scarle =

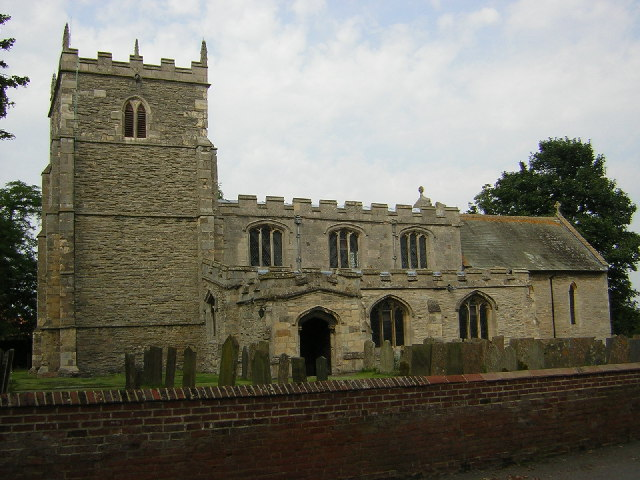
- St Helena's Church, South Scarle
- St Helena's Church, South Scarle
- 53°10′15.30″N 0°44′14.45″W
- OS grid reference: SK 84826 64024
- Location: South Scarle
- Country: England
- Denomination: Church of England

History
- Dedication: St Helena

Architecture
- Heritage designation: Grade I listed

Administration
- Diocese: Diocese of Southwell and Nottingham
- Archdeaconry: Newark
- Deanery: Newark and Southwell
- Parish: Langford

St Helena's Church is a Grade I listed parish church in the Church of England in South Scarle, Nottinghamshire.

== History ==
The church dates from the 12th century.

It is part of a group of parishes which includes

- St Bartholomew's Church, Langford
- St Giles' Church, Holme
- St Cecilia's Church, Girton
- All Saints' Church, Harby
- St George the Martyr's Church, North & South Clifton
- All Saints' Church, Collingham
- St John the Baptist's Church, Collingham
- Holy Trinity Church, Besthorpe
- St Helen's Church, Thorney
- All Saints' Church, Winthorpe

== Organ ==
The church contains a small pipe organ by T.H. Nicholson. A specification of the organ can be found on the National Pipe Organ Register.

== See also ==
- Grade I listed buildings in Nottinghamshire
- Listed buildings in South Scarle
