= Thorney, Nottinghamshire =

Village and civil parish in Nottinghamshire, England

Coordinates: 53.247197°N 0.71424670°W

Thorney
- Village and civil parish
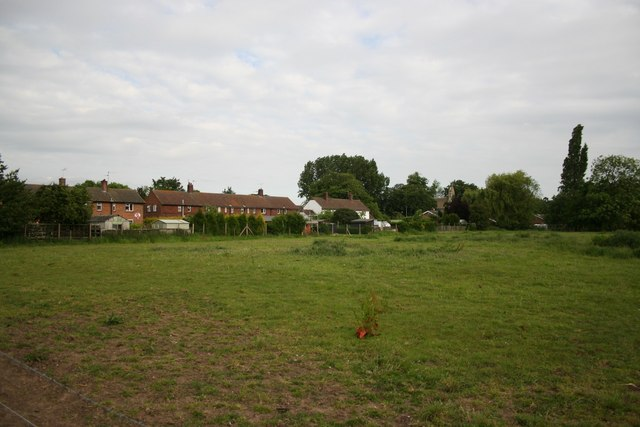
- view from the lane to Westwood Farm

- Location within Nottinghamshire
- Interactive map of Thorney
- Area: 3.51 sq mi (9.1 km^{2})
- Population: 228 (2021)
  - Density: 65/sq mi (25/km^{2})
- OS grid reference: SK 860729
  - London: 120 mi (190 km) SSE
- District: Newark and Sherwood
- Shire county: Nottinghamshire
- Region: East Midlands
- Country: England
- Sovereign state: United Kingdom
- Settlements: Thorney; Thorney Moor; Drinsey Nook (part)
- Post town: NEWARK
- Postcode district: NG23
- Dialling code: 01522
- Police: Nottinghamshire
- Fire: Nottinghamshire
- Ambulance: East Midlands
- UK Parliament: Newark
- Website: https://www.nottinghamshire.gov.uk/council-and-democracy/local/parish-councils/thorney-parish-council

Thorney is a village and civil parish about 10 miles (16 km) north of Newark-on-Trent, in the Newark and Sherwood district, in the county of Nottinghamshire, England. The settlement is close to the eastern edge of the county. In the census of 2011, the parish had a population of 248, falling to 228 at the 2021 census. A small portion of Drinsey Nook mainly in Lincolnshire falls into the parish to the north, Thorney Moor is a hamlet to the south of the parish area. The parish borders other nearby parishes including Wigsley, Kettlethorpe, Newton on Trent, Saxilby with Ingleby, Harby, North Clifton, South Clifton and Hardwick.

== Features ==
There are 7 listed buildings in Thorney.

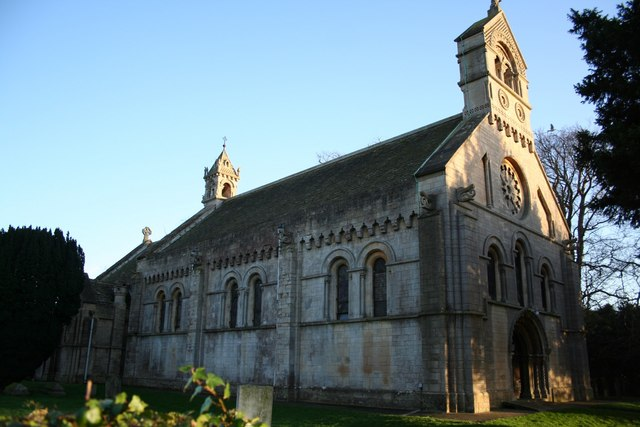
St Helen's Church

== History ==
The name "Thorney" means 'Enclosure of thorn-trees'. Thorney was recorded in the Domesday Book of 1086 as Torneshaie. Thorney parish also included the townships of Broadholme and Wigsley which became separate parishes in 1866. Iron Age, Bronze age and Roman settlements have been found. There was a Saxon settlement in around 500 AD. In 1853 the manor belonged to Rev. Christopher Nevile but was previously owned by the Nevile family. The parish was part of the Newark wapentake.
