= Listed buildings in Collingham, Nottinghamshire =

Collingham is a civil parish in the Newark and Sherwood district of Nottinghamshire, England. The parish contains 67 listed buildings that are recorded in the National Heritage List for England. Of these, two are listed at Grade I, the highest of the three grades, one is at Grade II*, the middle grade, and the others are at Grade II, the lowest grade. The parish contains the village of Collingham and the surrounding countryside, including the hamlet of Brough. Most of the listed buildings are houses, cottages and associated structures, farmhouses and farm buildings. The other listed buildings include churches, a village cross, a former railway station and a level crossing keeper's cottage, a war memorial and a telephone kiosk.

== Key ==
Grade	Criteria
I	Buildings of exceptional interest, sometimes considered to be internationally important
II*	Particularly important buildings of more than special interest
II	Buildings of national importance and special interest

== Buildings ==
Name and location	Photograph	Date	Notes	Grade
All Saints' Church, North Collingham; 53.14912°N 0.76081°W		12th century	The church has been altered and extended through the centuries, including restorations in 1859 and 1897, the latter by C. Hodgson Fowler. It is built in blue lias with roofs of lead and stone slabs, and consists of a nave with a clerestory, north and south aisles, north and south porches, a chancel with a vestry and an organ chamber, and a west tower. The tower has two stages, diagonal buttresses, a west window with a clock face above, round-headed windows on the south front, bell openings with four-centred arched heads, and an embattled parapet with four crocketed pinnacles.	I
St John the Baptist's Church, South Collingham; 53.14260°N 0.76566°W		12th century	The church has been altered and extended through the centuries, including three restorations in the 19th century. It is built in blue lias, with roofs of lead, slate, blue tile and stone slabs, and consists of a nave with a clerestory, north and south aisles, a south porch, a chancel with an organ chamber, and a west tower. The tower has three stages, string courses, a corbel table, and an embattled parapet with four crocketed pinnacles. There is a north polygonal stair turret, in the bottom stage is a three-light window with a four-centred arched head and a hood mould, and above are lancet windows, a clock face, and three-light bell openings.	I
Village cross 53.15167°N 0.75714°W		14th century	The stump of the village cross, moved to its present site in the 20th century, has a square plinth with three stages. On this is a square base, and a crocketed octagonal shaft. The cross is about 30 inches (760 mm) tall.	II
The White House; 53.14776°N 0.76169°W		16th century	The house, which has been altered and extended, has a timber framed core, and is in blue lias in the ground floor and rendered brick above, and has a hipped pantile roof. There are two storeys and an L-shaped plan, with a front of three bays, and a gabled porch at the rear. The extension to the east has two storeys and a single bay, and beyond is a stable with a single storey and a single bay. Inside the house is exposed timber framing.	II
Tudor Cottage; 53.14309°N 0.76002°W	—	16th century (probable)	A house with the ground floor in blue lias and the upper floor in brick, with a pantile roof and brick coped gables. There are two storeys and an L-shaped plan. The windows are casements, and in the north range are gabled dormers.	II
The Nunnery; 53.14214°N 0.76659°W		Late 16th century	A house with timber framing and pargeted rendering, in blue lias and brick, with an eaves band, and a pantile roof with brick coped gables. There are two storeys and attics, and an L-shaped plan, with a front of three bays. The windows are a mix of casements and sashes, some horizontally-sliding. In the north gable is a triangular opening with pigeon holes.	II
The Thatched Cottage and wall 53.14262°N 0.76222°W		Late 16th century	The cottage was extended to the north in the late 18th century. The original part has a timber framed core, brick walls on a stone plinth, and a thatched roof. There is a single storey and attics, and five bays. On the front is a porch, horizontally-sliding sash windows and casement windows. The extension is in blue lias and brick, with dentilled eaves and a pantile roof, and has a single storey and an attic. The boundary wall is in blue lias with coping, and ramps from about 1 metre (3 ft 3 in) to about 1.5 metres (4 ft 11 in).	II*
20 High Street; 53.14391°N 0.76076°W		17th century	A house that was later extended, in brick and stone, with a hipped pantile roof. The west range has two storeys and one bay, and contains sash windows in each front, those in the ground floor with segmental heads. To the east is a range with a single storey and an attic, with a coped gable, a doorway, a bay window, and a dormer. Beyond is a single-storey single-bay extension with a door, a sash window and a shop window.	II
1–3 Low Street; 53.15211°N 0.75783°W	—	17th century	A group of three cottages in brick on a plinth of blue lias, with some remaining timber framing, and a hipped pantile roof. There are two storeys, and an L-shaped plan, with a front of four bays. Most of the windows are horizontally-sliding sashes, some with segmental heads.	II
Fruit Farm and extension 53.14190°N 0.76628°W		17th century	The house, which was extended to the south in the 19th century, is in brick, and has a pantile roof with blue brick coped gables. There are two storeys and attics, three bays, and a two-storey two-bay extension. The doorway has a rectangular fanlight, and the windows are horizontally-sliding sashes, some with segmental heads.	II
Holly Farm House; 53.15129°N 0.76060°W		17th century	The farmhouse is in blue lias and brick, partly rendered, and has a Welsh slate roof with brick coped gables. There are two storeys and three bays. The doorway has a moulded surround and a hood on scrolled brackets. Most of the windows are horizontally-sliding sashes.	II
Lime Tree House; 53.14398°N 0.76291°W		17th century	A brick house that was extended in the 18th century. The original part has a brick plinth, a floor band, and a tile roof with brick tumbled coped gables. There are two storeys and attics, and an L-shaped plan with fronts of three and two bays, containing horizontally-sliding sash windows, some with segmental heads. The extension has a rendered plinth, floor bands, moulded eaves and a pantile roof. There are two storeys and two bays, and a mix of horizontally-sliding sash windows and casements.	II
The Beeches and outbuilding 53.14203°N 0.76553°W		17th century	A cottage with a timber framed core in blue lias]] and brick, with a floor band, and a pantile roof with brick coped gables and kneelers. There are two storeys and three bays, and the windows are casements, most with segmental heads. To the east is a single-storey single-bay outbuilding.	II
The Malthouse; 53.15013°N 0.76095°W		17th century	The house has a timber framed core, and is in blue lias and rendered brick, with dentilled eaves and a pantile roof. There are two storeys and an L-shaped plan, with a front range of three bays, and a rear wing. In the centre is a gabled porch, and the windows in the front are casements. The rear wing has a horizontally-sliding sash window and a two-light mullioned window.	II
The Nook; 53.14535°N 0.76220°W	—	17th century	A house with a timber framed core, in rendered colourwashed blue lias and brick, with a hipped pantile roof. There are two storeys and three bays. In the centre is a doorcase with a moulded surround and a hood, and the windows are sashes.	II
The Old Hall, walls, and outbuildings 53.15189°N 0.75863°W		17th century	The house, which has been extended, is in blue lias and brick, with dressings in brick and stone, and a pantile roof with coped gables. There are two storeys and attics, and an L-shaped plan, with a front of three bays. To the east is a servants' wing with two storeys and one bay, and there is an extensive extension at the rear. The garden wall is in brick with coping, and is about 22.5 metres (74 ft) high and 40 metres (130 ft) long. The outbuildings consist of a barn with a single storey and a loft, and three bays, and a stable with a single storey and loft. The boundary wall is about 80 metres (260 ft) long, and contains five corbelled piers, wrought iron carriage gates, and a wicket gate.	II
Yew Tree Farm House; 53.14298°N 0.76241°W	—	17th century	The farmhouse, which was later remodelled and extended, has two storeys, an L-shaped plan, and pantile roofs. The rear wing is the older part, and is in blue lias and brick with cogged eaves, and an eaves band. The front range is in buff brick with red brick dressings and coped gables. There are three bays and a single-bay extension on the right. In the centre is a porch with a pediment on scrolled brackets, it is flanked by canted bay windows, and the other windows are sashes.	II
87 High Street; 53.14684°N 0.75991°W		1656	A pair of cottages, later combined, with a timber framed core, rendered brick and stone, and a pantile roof. There is a single storey and attic, and two bays. On the front are two doorways with moulded architraves, to the left is a shop window, and between the doorways is a three-light casement window. In the attic is a gabled dormer with a three-light casement window.	II
White Hart Cottage; 53.14844°N 0.75931°W	—	1664	The house, originally an inn, in blue lias and brick, partly rendered, with an eaves band, and a pantile roof with brick coped gables. There are two storeys, and an L-shaped plan, with a front of three bays. In the centre is a projecting porch, and the windows are sashes.	II
165 and 167 Low Street; 53.15240°N 0.75775°W	—	Late 17th century	A pair of cottages in brick and blue lias, partly rendered, with a floor band, an eaves band, and pantile roofs with coped gables. There are two storeys and attics, five bays, and an extension to the north. In the ground floor are a porch, a French window and casement windows, and in the extension is a Tudor-style door. The upper floor contains horizontally-sliding sash windows, one with a segmental head.	II
The Old House; 53.15154°N 0.75754°W	—	1680	The house, with a timber framed core, is in blue lias and brick, and has a pantile roof. There are two storeys and attics, and three bays. On the front is a gabled porch, and a Tudor arched doorway flanked by casement windows with segmental heads. The upper floor contains three horizontally-sliding sash windows and one casement.	II
100 High Street; 53.14781°N 0.75930°W	—	c. 1700	The house is in red brick with a floor band, dentilled eaves and a pantile roof. There are two storeys, three bays, and a rear extension. In the centre is a doorway with a moulded surround and a bracketed hood, and the windows are horizontally-sliding sashes, some with segmental heads.	II
Rutland House and wall 53.15187°N 0.75985°W	—	Early 18th century	The house is in brick on a rendered stone plinth, with stone dressings, a floor band, moulded eaves, and a tile roof with coped gables. There are two storeys and attics, a front of four bays, and extensive later additions at the rear. In the centre is a gabled porch with a round-arched opening, to its right is a canted bay window, the other windows on the front are sashes, and in the roof are four gabled dormers. The boundary wall is in brick with stone coping, it is about 20 metres (66 ft) long, and contains a carriage entrance.	II
The Little House and 20 Low Street; 53.14441°N 0.76300°W		Early 18th century	A house, later divided into two, in blue lias and brick, partly rendered, with a pantile roof. There are two storeys, a main range of four bays, and single-bay extensions at each end. On the front is an ogee-headed porch, and most of the windows are horizontally-sliding sashes.	II
Woodgate; 53.14395°N 0.76065°W	—	Early 18th century	A house that was extended to the rear in the 20th century, it is in colourwashed blue lias and brick, with a belt course and a pantile roof. There are two storeys and attics, and an L-shaped plan. The original part has horizontally-sliding sash windows, and there is a porch in the angle. The rear extension is rendered with applied timber framing, and has casement windows.	II
37 High Street; 53.14486°N 0.76078°W		1744	A pair of cottages on a corner site in brick with a timber framed core and pantile roofs. The left cottage has a single storey and attics, and two bays. In the centre are paired doorways, with a sash window to the right and a fixed window to the left, both with segmental heads, and above are dormers with horizontally-sliding sashes. The cottage to the right is later and higher, with two storeys, two bays and a rear extension. There are shop windows in both fronts and sashes above.	II
22 High Street; 53.14753°N 0.75934°W		18th century	A house in brick and blue lias, with moulded brick dressings, a floor band, an eaves band, and a pantile roof with brick coped gables. There are two storeys and attics, and an L-shaped plan. The central doorway has a moulded surround, and a moulded triangular pediment on scrolled brackets. This is flanked by canted bay windows, and the other windows are sashes. The boundary wall is in brick with blue brick coping, and contains two piers with pyramidal stone caps.	II
55 and 57 High Street; 53.14577°N 0.76039°W		18th century	A pair of houses in brick and blue lias with a pantile roof, two storeys and four bays. In the left bay is a doorway and attached shop window, and there are two more doorways to the right. The other windows are sashes, those in the ground floor with segmental heads.	II
128 and 132 Low Street; 53.15209°N 0.75766°W	—	Mid 18th century	A malthouse and a cottage, later two houses, in brick with dentilled eaves, and a pantile roof with brick coped gables and kneelers. There are two storeys and attics, and the windows are a mix of casements and horizontally-sliding sashes, some with segmental heads.	II
Fern Cottage and Darcy's Cottage; 53.14535°N 0.76065°W	—	18th century	A pair of brick cottages with a floor band, cogged eaves, a pantile roof, and two storeys. Fern Cottage on the left has three bays, and Darcy's Cottage has a single bay. The windows are a mix of horizontally-sliding sashes and casements, and all the ground floor openings have segmental heads.	II
Holly House; 53.14705°N 0.75990°W		18th century	A house in brick with patterned headers, floor bands, and a Welsh slate roof with coped gables. There are three storeys and an L-shaped plan, with a front range of three bays. The central doorway has a moulded surround, a fanlight and a hood on decorative brackets. The windows are sashes, those in the lower two floors with segmental heads.	II
Lane End; 53.14713°N 0.76181°W	—	Mid 18th century	A brick house with cogged eaves, and a pantile roof with coped gables. There are two storeys and attics, and an L-shaped plan, with a front range of three bays, and a single-storey rear wing. In the centre is a gabled porch flanked by gabled bay windows, and in the upper floor are sash windows.	II
Office Cottage and Lilac Cottage; 53.14297°N 0.76272°W		18th century	A pair of cottages with an extension to the west in the early 19th century. They are in brick, the extension with pale headers, and have dentilled eaves, and a pantile roof with coped gables and kneelers. There are two storeys, the original cottages have two bays each, and the extension has one. On the front are three doorways with segmental heads, and the windows are horizontally-sliding sashes, those in the ground floor with segmental heads.	II
South Collingham House; 53.14264°N 0.76267°W		18th century	A small country house that was much altered in 1887, it is in brick on a blue lias plinth, with stone dressings, and a roof of tile and pantile with brick coped shaped gables. There are two storeys and attics, and a north front of two bays, containing sash windows with segmental heads, and in the attic are mullioned and transomed windows. The east front has three bays and a datestone, and the south front has three bays, and it contains a central gabled porch and a balustrade. There is a dwarf boundary wall with square chamfered panels, and two brick piers with stone finials.	II
The Manor House and Conservatory; 53.14433°N 0.76387°W	—	18th century	The house, which was later extended, is in brick on stone plinths, and has roofs in tile and pantile with coped gables. There are two storeys and attics, and an L-shaped plan, with a front range of three bays, a single-bay extension on the left, and a rear wing. On the front is a porch with a hipped roof flanked by bay windows, and in the upper floor are sash windows with segmental heads. The conservatory has a brick plinth, an iron and timber frame, and four bays.	II
The Red House; 53.14373°N 0.76079°W		Mid 18th century	A house, later three shops, in brick and blue lias, with moulded floor bands, and a pantile roof with brick coped gables. There are three storeys, and an L-shaped plan, with a front of five bays, the middle bay projecting, and a two-storey rear wing. In the ground floor are plate glass windows, and the upper floors contain sashes. At the top of the middle bay is a pedimented gable with bands and pilasters, containing a semicircular blank panel with painted glazing bars.	II
Vine Farmhouse; 53.14869°N 0.75917°W		18th century	The farmhouse is in brick on a stone plinth, with quoins, a floor band, dentilled eaves, and a hipped Welsh slate roof. There are two storeys and attics, a front of five bays, and a rear wing. In the centre is a gabled porch, and a doorway with a moulded surround and a rectangular fanlight. Above the porch is a blind panel, and the windows are sashes, those in the lower floors with segmental heads.	II
Boundary Wall, Low Street; 53.14284°N 0.76414°W		Late 18th century	The wall is in blue lias, with dressings in brick and stone and stone coping. It is about 2 metres (6 ft 7 in) high, and extends for about 2 metres (6 ft 7 in) along Westfield Land and for about 400 metres (1,300 ft) on Low Street. In the south part are four triangular-headed rustic archways containing rustic-work gates, and to the north are two brick gateways, one with a chamfered arch, and the other with a pointed arch in a pedimented recess, flanked by brick piers with stone pyramidal caps.	II
Collingham Old Hall; 53.12924°N 0.76578°W	—	Late 18th century	A farmhouse in rendered brick with stone dressings, dentilled eaves and a hipped tile roof. There are two storeys and three bays. In the centre is a doorway with Doric columns, an entablature, a moulded open pediment, and a fanlight with Gothic tracery. The windows are sashes.	II
Colton's Farmhouse and wall 53.12217°N 0.74806°W	—	Late 18th century	The farmhouse is in brick, with dentilled eaves, and a pantile roof with terracotta coped gables. There are two storeys and attics, and an L-shaped plan, with a front of three bays. In the centre is a doorway with a moulded surround, a fanlight, and a hood on scrolled brackets. The windows are sashes with rubbed brick heads. The boundary wall is in brick with coping in terracotta and brick, it contains four piers with stone caps and a wrought iron gate, and at the east end is as mounting block.	II
Corner Cottage; 53.14299°N 0.76307°W		Late 18th century	The cottage, which was later extended, is in brick, with dentilled eaves, and a pantile roof with coped gables. There are two storeys and three bays. Most of the windows are horizontally-sliding sashes, and the ground floor openings have segmental heads.	II
High House; 53.14178°N 0.76711°W		Late 18th century	A farmhouse in brick with cogged eaves, and a pantile roof with brick coped gables. There are three storeys and a symmetrical front of three bays. In the centre is a doorway with a segmental head, the lower two floors contain sash windows with segmental heads, and in the top floor are horizontally pivoted windows.	II
Ivy Cottage; 53.14256°N 0.76456°W		Late 18th century	A house that was extended in the 19th century, it is in brick with dentilled eaves, and a pantile roof with terracotta coped gables and kneelers. There are two storeys, three bays, and a single-bay extension on the left. The porch is gabled and contains a Tudor arched doorway. Above the doorway is a casement window, and the other windows are horizontally-sliding sashes, those in the ground floor with segmental heads.	II
Barn, Pitomy Farm; 53.15144°N 0.76092°W	—	Late 18th century	The barn is in brick with dentilled eaves, and a pantile roof with tumbled gables. There is a single storey and three bays. In the centre are doors, the piers with stone bases,	II
Smith Woolley Offices; 53.14276°N 0.76293°W		Late 18th century	Cottages converted for use as offices, the building is in brick with a pantile roof. There is a single storey and attics, and a front of five bays. On the front is a latticed timber porch and a doorway with a rectangular fanlight. In the ground floor are mullioned and transomed windows with segmental heads, and the attic contains gabled dormers with casement windows.	II
The Lodge, Conservatory and walls 53.14276°N 0.76139°W	—	Late 18th century	The house is in brick with cogged eaves, and roofs of pantile and slate with coped gables. The main range has two storeys and attics, and three bays, and there are extensions at the rear. The south front has three bays, and it contains a round-arched porch, and a doorway with a fanlight, and to the east is a canted bay window. The windows are a mix of casements and sashes, some horizontally-sliding, and some with segmental heads. To the west is a conservatory with three bays and a hipped roof. The boundary wall is in blue lias and brick, with coping in stone and terracotta, containing two gates, and brick piers with stone caps.	II
23 Queen Street; 53.15115°N 0.76004°W	—	1777	A house in brick and blue lias, with a floor band, and a pantile roof with coped gables and kneelers. There is a single storey and attics, and three bays. Most of the windows, including those in the two dormers, are horizontally-sliding sashes, and in the north gable is a datestone.	II
Carshalton; 53.14981°N 0.75854°W		1786	A brick house with pale headers in the gable ends, and a pantile roof with coped gables. There are two storeys and attics, and a T-shaped plan with a front range of three bays. In the centre is a doorway with a moulded surround and a hood on scroll brackets, and to its left is an initialled and dated brick. The windows on the front are sashes with segmental heads, and in the attics in the gable ends are horizontally-sliding sashes.	II
15 High Street; 53.14357°N 0.76116°W		1797	The house is in brick with dentilled eaves and a pantile roof. There are two storeys and three bays. In the centre is an oriel window, above which is a datestone. The other windows are sashes, those in the ground floor with segmental heads.	II
Aberdeen House; 53.14933°N 0.75882°W	—	c. 1800	A farmhouse in brick with stone dressings, on a plinth, with floor bands, dentilled eaves, and a tile roof with brick coped gables. There are three storeys, three bays, and a two-storey rear extension. In the centre is a doorway with a reeded surround, a rectangular fanlight, and a hood on curved brackets. To its left is a canted bay window, and the other windows are sashes, those in the lower two floors with segmental heads. In the rear extension are shop windows, and the boundary wall is in brick with stone coping and square brick piers with stone caps.	II
Shaw Cottage; 53.14240°N 0.76441°W	—	c. 1800	The cottage is in brick with patterned headers, dentilled eaves, and a pantile roof with brick coped gables. The doorway is in the centre, the windows are sashes, and all the openings have segmental heads.	II
House adjoining The Cross Shop; 53.15136°N 0.75695°W		c. 1800	The house is in brick, and has a pantile roof with coped gables. There are two storeys and attics, and a front of three bays. In the centre is a latticework porch, and the windows are sashes with segmental heads. To the east is a 19th-century extension containing a shop and a workshop, with a hipped roof and a double shop front.	II
7 Dykes End; 53.14315°N 0.76045°W	—	Early 19th century	The cottage is in brick with dentilled eaves, and a canted hipped Welsh slate roof. There is a single storey and an attic, and three bays. The south end is canted, and contains openings with pointed heads, including windows with Y-tracery. Over it is a canted verandah on four posts, with a dormer, and on the east front is a rustic porch.	II
Coach House, The Chestnuts; 53.14494°N 0.76270°W	—	Early 19th century	The former coach house and stables are in brick with stone dressings, and a Welsh slate roof with elaborate coped shaped gables. There is a two-storey central bay, flanked by single-storey lean-tos. In the centre is an elliptical-arched opening with a keystone, to the north is a round-headed doorway, to the south are double garage doors, and above them is a round-headed window with Y-tracery.	II
The Corner House; 53.15132°N 0.75748°W		Early 19th century	The house is in brick with stone dressings, and a pantile roof with coped gables. There are two storeys, and six bays in two ranges. On the front is a doorway with a moulded surround, a French window, and a canted bay window. Most of the windows in the ground floor are sashes, and in the upper floor are top-hung casements.	II
The Thatched Cottage; 53.14396°N 0.76117°W		Early 19th century	The cottage, which was extended later in the 19th century, is in colourwashed brick with dentilled eaves. The original part has a single storey, a square plan, and a pyramidal thatched roof. On the south front is a timber porch with a pantile roof and a Tudor-style doorway, and the windows are round-headed casements with Y-tracery. The extension is in roughcast brick with a pantile roof, a single storey, three bays and a T-shaped plan. The middle bay projects and contains a triple-lancet oriel window.	II
The Chestnuts and wall 53.14501°N 0.76301°W	—	c. 1828	A house with later extensions, in brick with stone dressings, angle pilasters, a moulded cornice, and a hipped Westmorland slate roof. There are two storeys and five bays. The central doorway is round-headed, in a recess, and has a fanlight. The windows are sashes, those in the ground floor with round heads. The house is flanked by round-headed entrances to the garden. The boundary wall is in brick with stone coping, at the front it is a dwarf wall, and at the rear the wall is about 3 metres (9.8 ft) high, with three tapering buttresses.	II
Cross Lane Level Crossing House; 53.14639°N 0.74548°W		c. 1848	The house, originally a level crossing keeper's cottage, is in colourwashed gault brick, with blue brick dressings, and a hipped and gabled Welsh slate roof. There is a single storey, and a cruciform plan. The middle bay is canted, and most of the windows are casements.	II
Station House; 53.14411°N 0.75034°W		c. 1848	A station built for the Midland Railway in Italianate style, later a private house. It is in gault brick with stone dressings, eaves bands, bracketed deep eaves, and Welsh slate roofs. There are two storeys and three bays, the middle bay projecting under a pediment, and containing a tripartite bay window with a hipped roof and bracketed eaves. The outer bays contain arcades of three arches with keystones and canopies. In the upper floor are round-headed casement windows with keystones.	II
House Cottage; 53.14230°N 0.76204°W		1849	An estate cottage in brick, with moulded brick dressings, cogged eaves, and a pantile roof with pierced bargeboards and carved pendants. There is a single storey and an attic, and a cruciform plan. The porch is gabled and has a Tudor arched doorway with a hood mould, above which is an initialled datestone. The windows are three-light casements with splayed mullions, jambs and hood moulds.	II
104 Low Street; 53.15109°N 0.76004°W	—	19th century	A brick cottage with a floor band, stone sills, dentilled eaves, and a pantile roof with brick coped gables. There are two storeys and a single bay. On each floor is a three-light casement window with a segmental head.	II
Wall, All Saints' Church; 53.14916°N 0.76124°W		19th century	The boundary wall enclosing the churchyard is in brick with brick coping, and extends for about 100 metres (330 ft). It contains a wooden wicket gate and a floor mark stone.	II
Paddock Cottage; 53.14233°N 0.76447°W	—	19th century	The cottage is in brick with dentilled eaves, and a pantile roof with coped gables. There are two storeys and two bays. On the front are two doorways with segmental heads, the central one blocked. The windows are sashes with segmental heads, those in the upper floor are horizontally-sliding.	II
Gatehouse, South Collingham House; 53.14278°N 0.76271°W		Late 19th century	The gatehouse is in brick with corbelled eaves and a tile roof. There are two storeys and three bays. In the centre is a basket-arched carriage entrance with a chamfered surround, to the left is a doorway, and above the arch is a gabled dormer with a mullioned and transomed casement window.	II
St Stephen's Church, Brough; 53.11586°N 0.75192°W		1885–86	A small church in brick with dressings in stone and blue brick, and a tile roof with decorative ridge tiles. It consists of a nave and a chancel under a continuous roof, a south porch and a vestry. In the centre of the roof is a bellcote with tilehanging. The windows are lancets, and at the west end is a window with five stepped lancets.	II
North Collingham War Memorial; 53.14856°N 0.76060°W		1919	The war memorial is in the churchyard of All Saints' Church. It is in stone and about 8 metres (26 ft) high. The memorial consists of an elaborate crucifix with an octagonal shaft, on an octagonal plinth on two steps. One side of the plinth has a carved inscription, and on other faces are bronze plaques with the names of those lost in the two World Wars.	II
Telephone kiosk 53.14199°N 0.76598°W	—	1935	The K6 type telephone kiosk was designed by Giles Gilbert Scott. Constructed in cast iron with a square plan and a dome, it has three unperforated crowns in the top panels.	II
