= Brough, Nottinghamshire =

Hamlet in Nottinghamshire, England

Coordinates: 53.12°N 0.75°W

Brough
- Location within Nottinghamshire
- OS grid reference: SK837583
- Civil parish: Collingham
- District: Newark and Sherwood
- Shire county: Nottinghamshire
- Region: East Midlands
- Country: England
- Sovereign state: United Kingdom
- Post town: NEWARK
- Postcode district: NG23
- Police: Nottinghamshire
- Fire: Nottinghamshire
- Ambulance: East Midlands
- UK Parliament: Newark

Brough is a hamlet in Nottinghamshire, England.

== Location ==
It is located in the Newark and Sherwood District, 5 miles (8 km) to the north of Newark-on-Trent, on the A46 Fosse Way. Its population is included in the adjacent civil parish of Collingham.

== History ==
Brough stands on the site of the Roman town of Crococalana, which grew around a military fort in the 1st century AD. The town spread along the Roman Fosse Way for about a mile, and had ditched defences.

Brough Methodist Chapel is now permanently closed.

== See also ==
- Listed buildings in Collingham, Nottinghamshire
