= Listed buildings in South Scarle =

South Scarle is a civil parish in the Newark and Sherwood district of Nottinghamshire, England. The parish contains ten listed buildings that are recorded in the National Heritage List for England. Of these, one is listed at Grade I, the highest of the three grades, and the others are at Grade II, the lowest grade. The parish contains the village of South Scarle and the surrounding area. All the listed buildings are in the village, and consist of a church, houses cottages and farmhouses, a pigeoncote and a barn.

== Key ==
Grade	Criteria
I	Buildings of exceptional interest, sometimes considered to be internationally important
II	Buildings of national importance and special interest

== Buildings ==
Name and location	Photograph	Date	Notes	Grade
St Helena's Church; 53.16664°N 0.73268°W		12th century	The church has been altered and extended through the centuries, including a restoration in 1870–71. It is built in blue lias with roofs of Welsh slate and lead, and consists of a nave with a clerestory, north and south aisles, a south porch, a chancel, and a west tower. The tower has four stages, clasping buttresses, string courses, a triple lancet window with a hood mould, two-light lancet bell openings, and an embattled parapet with eight crocketed pinnacles. There are also embattled parapets on the nave, the aisles and the porch.	I
The Old Vicarage; 53.16690°N 0.73256°W		16th century (probable)	The vicarage, later a private house, is in stone and brick in the lower part, and timber framed above, it is mainly rendered, and has a projecting floor band, and a pantile roof with coped gables and kneelers. There are two storeys and attics and an L-shaped plan, with a main range of four bays. The doorway has a moulded surround and a hood on scrolled brackets, and the windows are casements.	II
Pigeoncote, Beeches Farm; 53.16756°N 0.73394°W		17th century	The pigeoncote is in blue lias with brick dressings, a projecting floor band, and a pyramidal pantile roof. There is a square plan and two storeys. On the east front is a doorway with a fanlight, above which are pigeonholes in the eaves. On the roof is a later dormer containing pigeonholes.	II
Church Farm House; 53.16652°N 0.73221°W		17th century	The lower part of the farmhouse is in blue lias, the upper parts are in brick, and it has a pantile roof with a prominent curved stepped gable. There are two storeys and an L-shaped plan, with a front of two bays, a single-bay cross wing to the south, and a single-storey block in the angle. Most of the windows are horizontally-sliding sashes, and in the cross wing is a small casement window.	II
Corner Farmhouse; 53.16782°N 0.73293°W		17th century	The farmhouse is on a corner site, the lower part is in blue lias, the upper part is in brick, there are two floor bands, the upper one cogged, and a pantile roof, the gable with kneelers. It has two storeys and attics and an L-shaped plan, with a front range of two bays. The doorway in the gable end has a moulded surround and a hood on curved brackets. The windows are a mix of casements and sashes, some horizontally-sliding.	II
Greystones; 53.16516°N 0.73333°W		17th century	The former farmhouse is in blue lias with brick gables and window surrounds, and it has a pantile roof with a coped gable on the right. There are two storeys and attics and four bays, and the windows are casements. To the right is a later single-storey single-bay extension in brick.	II
The Hall, conservatory, wall and gates 53.16603°N 0.73282°W		17th century	The house is in blue lias and brick, with dressings in stone and stucco, dentilled eaves, and roofs in pantile and Welsh slate. There are three ranges around a courtyard and a single-storey extension to the west. The west front has two storeys and attics, and three bays, the middle bay projecting under a modillioned open pediment. In the centre is a doorway with a moulded surround, a fanlight, and a hood on scroll brackets. The outer bays contain canted bay windows, in the upper floor are sash windows, the one above the doorway with a round head and a keystone, and those in the outer bays with segmental heads. In the attic are two gabled dormers. The north range has two storeys and two bays, and the conservatory, which is in brick with a timber framework, has a single storey and four bays. The boundary wall is in blue lias and brick with terracotta coping, and contains ornate cast iron gates flanked by square cast iron piers with cushion capitals and pyramidal caps.	II
Hall Farmhouse; 53.16629°N 0.73398°W		1710	The farmhouse is in blue lias and some brick, with a pantile roof and a brick band in the gable. There are two storeys and an L-shaped plan, with a front range of three bays. In the centre is a gabled porch, flanked by three-light horizontally-sliding sash windows, and in the upper floor are a fixed light and a casement window. At the rear is an initialled datestone.	II
Yew Tree Cottage; 53.16783°N 0.73150°W		18th century	The cottage is in blue lias and brick with a pantile roof. There is a single storey and an attic, and three bays. On the front is a porch flanked by horizontally-sliding sash windows, the one to the left with a timber lintel and to the right with a segmental head. In the south gable are a casement window and two blocked openings.	II
Barn, Corner Farm; 53.16761°N 0.73297°W		Early 19th century	The barn is in brick with corner buttresses, and a pantile roof with coped gables and kneelers. There is a single storey and three bays, the middle bay projecting and containing an arched carriage entry. The outer bays contain windows with segmental heads, and vents in diamond patterns.	II
