= Langford, Nottinghamshire =

Village and civil parish in Nottinghamshire, England

Coordinates: 53.114368°N 0.77409°W

Langford
- Village and civil parish
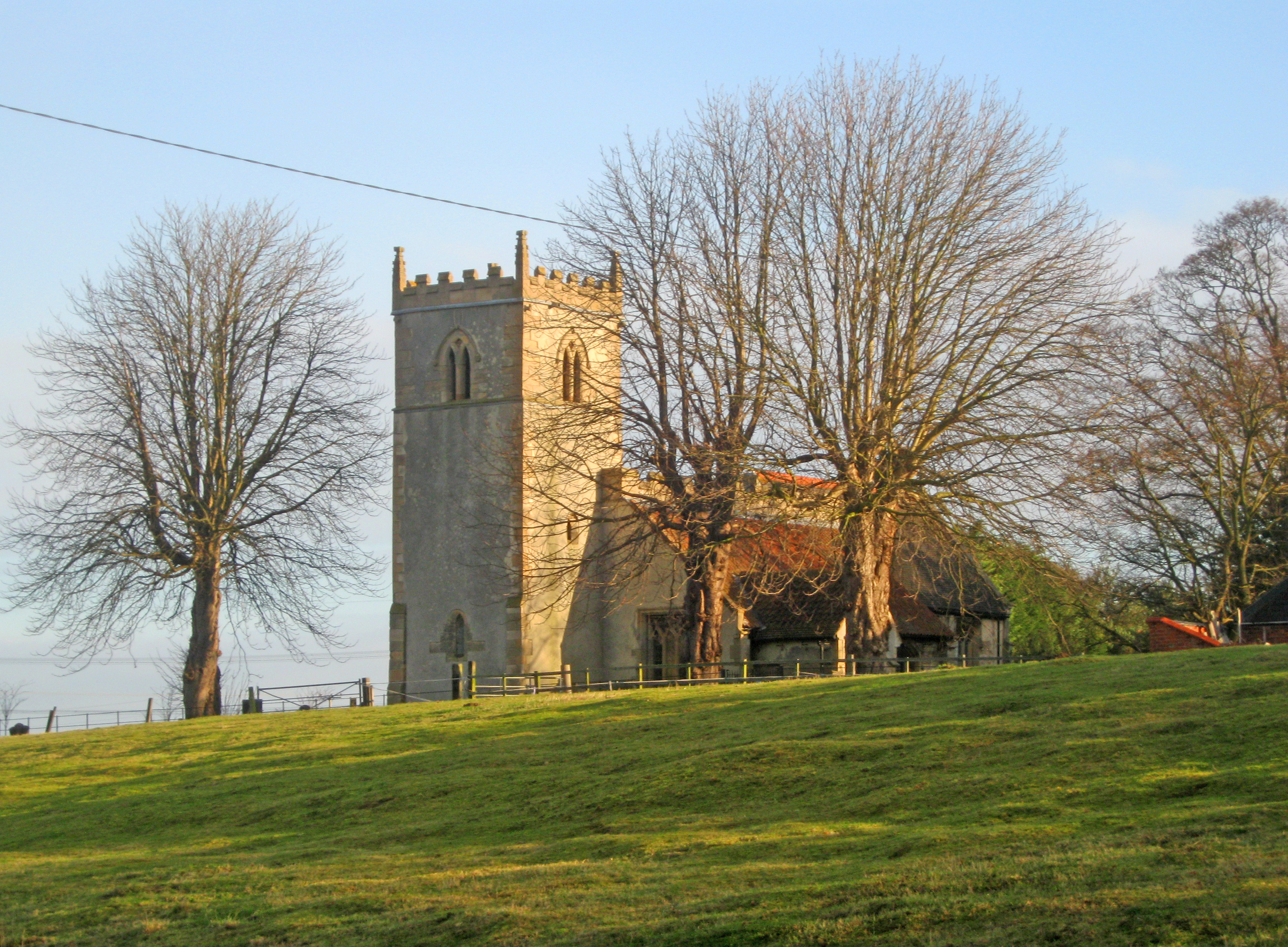
- St Bartholomew's Church

- Location within Nottinghamshire
- Interactive map of Langford
- Area: 3.25 sq mi (8.4 km^{2})
- Population: 104 (2021)
  - Density: 32/sq mi (12/km^{2})
- OS grid reference: SK 8258
  - London: 115 mi (185 km) SSE
- District: Newark and Sherwood
- Shire county: Nottinghamshire
- Region: East Midlands
- Country: England
- Sovereign state: United Kingdom
- Post town: Newark
- Postcode district: NG23
- Dialling code: 01636
- Police: Nottinghamshire
- Fire: Nottinghamshire
- Ambulance: East Midlands
- UK Parliament: Newark
- Website: http://www.winthorpe.org.uk

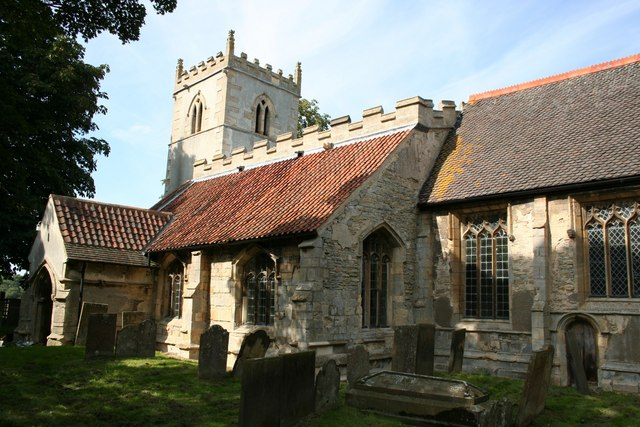
St Bartholomew's Church, Langford, Nottinghamshire

Langford is a village and civil parish in Nottinghamshire, England. It is located four miles north-east of Newark-on-Trent and two miles east from the River Trent. Population for the civil parish was 104 at the 2021 census. It lies along the A1133 which comes off of the A46 road.

== History ==
=== Lords ===
In 1066 it was recorded in the Domesday Book that Leofric the noble son of Leofwin was Lord of Langford and was lord of another 16 parishes/villages until the time of the Norman conquest of England. Then Ranulf, who was not associated with any places before the conquest, became Lord of Langford as well as another 100 locations by 1086. The value of this land to the Lord between 1066 and 1086, according to The Domesday Book, was between £4 – £4.50 and had a taxable value of 2.4 geld (Danegeld) units.

=== Later heritage ===
Although Langford is currently located two miles from the River Trent it has not always been this way. In "1575 there was a cataclysmic flood" which altered the course of the Trent which meant Langford and nearby Holme were now on the same side of the river. Before this change in the rivers course the Trent used to flow next to St Bartholomew's church and Holme was on the opposite side of the bank.

John Marius Wilson's Imperial Gazetteer of England and Wales (1870–72) records Langford as follows:

Langford, a parish in Newark district, Notts; on the Newark and Lincoln railway, and on the Fosse way, near the river Trent, and near the boundary with Lincolnshire, 3 miles NNE of Newark r[ailway] station. Post-town, Newark. Acres, 2,182. Real property, £2,471. Pop., 161. Houses, 24. The manor and most of the land belong to Lord Middleton. Langford House is the seat of T. A. F. Burnaby, Esq. Bricks are made. A Roman settlement was here. The living is a p[erpetual] curacy, annexed to the vicarage of Holme, in the diocese of Lincoln. The church is a plain building, with a tower.

== Population ==
At the time of the 2001 census, it had a population of 100 with 37 households. This was less than in previous centuries – in 1801 it was 124, 1811 was 118, 1821 was 147, etc. Until 1901, 145 (at that time the village had its own school with two teachers) there was a 20% decrease in the population. There was one more increase in the population in 1911 of 9% but there was then a steady decrease until 1960.

However, the fewest people to ever live in Langford is none, as in "1593 the village was 'dispeopled' to make way for sheep". This also resulted in the present site of the village to be about half a mile from its previous site.

The population density of England and Wales between 1880 and 1960 has been increasing at a steady rate whereas Langford has barely changed at all in comparison. Langford has had small changes in its population density but overall in the 80-year period it has slightly decreased.

The parish reported a population of 104 residents at the 2021 census.

== Industry ==
In 1800 Langford had a population of 124, with 116 employed in agricultural work which is likely to have been farming due to the landscape of the area.

In 1831 there were only three occupational categories in use in Langford, all related to agricultural work which is common in a civil parish at this date. These occupations were farmers employing labourers, farmers not employing labourers and agricultural labourers. Over half were agricultural labourers, just over a quarter farmers employing labourers and only four farmers not employing labourers.

By 1881 the range of occupational categories became more varied. "Agriculture" was still recorded as the most common occupation in Langford with 43 males and 1 female working in this category. The second most prevalent occupation was "Domestic service or offices", which was subject to mainly female workers (13) and only two men in this category.

Other occupations of Langford in 1881 included working as "General/Local Government", "Professionals", "Transport and Comm", "Animals", "Wrks in Dress" and "Wrks in Var. Mineral Substances". These were less popular occupations at the time and only had 13 people working between these categories. The more laboured occupations only had males working in them, e.g. "Wrks in Var. Mineral Substances", whereas the females mainly worked in less physical environments such as "General/Local Government" work. It was also recorded that there were 13 "persons without specified occupations", and 16 with "unknown occupations". All 13 in these categories came under female.

== Housing and amenities ==
In 1831 Langford had 25 houses in total and stayed around this number until 1851 until 1881 when it increased to 31 houses and 32 in 1891. By 1901 Langford had a total of 28 households. This then increased to 42 by 1961, with a variation of increases and decreases in that time as the graph, Langford Nottinghamshire Total Household Chart 1901–1961 (on the right), shows. Within this period there was only one vacant house. Also, from 1931 to 1961 the total rooms in Langford has also increased by 55 rooms which is not surprising because of the increase in houses at this point as well.

=== Architecture ===
The present village dates from a rebuilding in the 18th century, the original medieval village now only earthworks in fields to the West. Langford Old Hall is a stone building of the 17th century. Langford Hall is a brick building built between 1780 and 1790 for the Duncombe family, built by John Carr. The parish church of St Bartholomew is to the north of the village.

=== Leisure ===
The village gives its name to the nearby Langford Lowfields RSPB reserve, a tarmac and sand quarry that is gradually being transformed into a nature reserve with extensive reedbeds. The site is home to species such as sand martin, bearded tit and Cetti's warbler.

== See also ==
- Listed buildings in Langford, Nottinghamshire
