= Listed buildings in Girton, Nottinghamshire =

Girton is a civil parish in the Newark and Sherwood district of Nottinghamshire, England. The parish contains three listed buildings that are recorded in the National Heritage List for England. All the listed buildings are designated at Grade II, the lowest of the three grades, which is applied to "buildings of national importance and special interest". The parish contains the village of Girton and the surrounding area. All the listed buildings are in the village, and consist of a church, the former vicarage and a farmhouse.

== Buildings ==
| Name and location | Photograph | Date | Notes |
|---|---|---|---|
| St Cecilia's Church; 53.18657°N 0.76626°W | | 13th century | A small church that has been altered during the centuries, including a restoration in 1879. It is built in blue lias, and has roofs of Westmorland and Welsh slate. The church consists of a nave, a chancel and a south porch, with a bellcote on the east end of the nave. Most of the windows are lancets, and in the west wall is a circular window. |
| Fleet Farm Cottage; 53.18425°N 0.76731°W | — | 17th century | A farmhouse in blue lias and brick, partly rendered, with some exposed timber framing at the rear, and a pantile roof with coped gables. There are two storeys and attics, and three bays, the middle bay projecting. On the front is a gabled porch, and the windows are casements, some with segmental heads. |
| The Old Vicarage; 53.18613°N 0.76622°W | — | Late 18th century | The vicarage, later a private house, is in red brick with a tile roof. There are three storeys and three bays. In the centre is a doorway, and the windows are sashes, those in the lower two floors with segmental heads. To the right is a service wing with two storeys and a single bay, containing casement windows. |
