= Listed buildings in Thorney, Nottinghamshire =

Thorney is a civil parish in the Newark and Sherwood district of Nottinghamshire, England. The parish contains seven listed buildings that are recorded in the National Heritage List for England. Of these, one is listed at Grade II*, the middle of the three grades, and the others are at Grade II, the lowest grade. The parish contains the village of Thorney and the surrounding area. All this listed buildings are in the village, and consist of houses, a farmhouse, a church, ruins of a former church in the churchyard, and a war memorial.

== Key ==
Grade	Criteria
II*	Particularly important buildings of more than special interest
II	Buildings of national importance and special interest

== Buildings ==
Name and location	Photograph	Date	Notes	Grade
Ruins of Old Church; 53.24576°N 0.71329°W		13th century	Ruins from the previous church have been re-erected in the churchyard of St Helen's Church, and are in stone. One consists of two chamfered arches with two circular piers and a clustered pier. The other is a detached arch with a Perpendicular window. Stones with chevron decoration are incorporated in the ruins.	II
The Old Manor House; 53.24633°N 0.71315°W		1649	Two cottages combined into one house, it is in brick on a plinth, with a moulded floor band, and a pantile roof with coped gables and stone ball finials. There are two storeys and attics, and three bays. In the centre is a three-light casement window with a triangular moulded brick pediment containing the date. To the east is a doorway with a timber lintel, a two light horizontally-sliding sash window with a segmental head, and a blocked four-centred arched opening. In the west gable is a three-light mullioned casement window, above which is a casement window with a moulded hood, and in the apex is a blank brick plaque.	II
Firs Farmhouse; 53.24790°N 0.71397°W	—	c. 1700	The farmhouse is in brick, with floor bands, dentilled eaves, and a pantile roof with coped gables. There are two storeys and attic, and three bays. In the centre is a flat-roofed porch, most of the windows are horizontally-sliding sashes, those in the ground floor with segmental heads, and there is one casement window.	II
Cottage, former Thorney Hall; 53.24574°N 0.71309°W	—	Late 18th century	The house, part of the service wing of the former hall, is in brick, with stone dressings, and a Westmorland slate roof with a stone coped gable and a kneeler to the north. There are two storeys and four bays. The doorway is recessed in a round-arched opening, and the windows are sashes, those in the ground floor in round-arched openings with keystones.	II
House, former Thorney Hall; 53.24561°N 0.71305°W	—	Late 18th century	The house, part of the service wing of the former hall, which was later extended, is in brick, with stone dressings, two string courses, a cornice, a parapet, cogged eaves at the rear, and a slate roof with a coped gable to the north, and a hipped roof on an extension. There are two storeys, a main range of four bays, a south extension of two storeys and a single bay, and a single-storey flat-roofed extension to the west. Most of the windows are sashes, those in the ground floor in round-arched recesses with keystones, and elsewhere with lintels and keystones. In the flat-roofed extension are semicircular casement windows and a round-headed doorway.	II
St Helen's Church; 53.24572°N 0.71381°W		1845–49	The church, designed by L. N. Cottingham, is in stone with a roof of stone slabs, and it consists of a nave, a chancel, a north vestry, and two bellcotes. The bellcote on the west gable has two stages, two round-arched openings, and a chequerwork coped gable with a cross. The bellcote on the junction of the nave and the chancel has four round-headed openings, two blind niches containing figures, and a pyramidal roof with lucarnes and an iron cross. At the west end is an elaborately decorated round-arched doorway with three orders, above which are three round windows and a wheel window.	II*
War memorial 53.24567°N 0.71424°W		c. 1920	The war memorial takes the form of a gateway to the churchyard of St Helen's Church. It is flanked by stone gate piers with shallow pyramidal caps. The gates are in iron and decorative, with spearhead railings, and pierced lettering and dates. On each pier is a sandstone plaque with the names of those lost in the First World War.	II
