= Langford Hall =

Country house in Nottinghamshire, England

- Location in Nottinghamshire

General information
- Architectural style: Neoclassical
- Location: Langford, Nottinghamshire, England
- Coordinates: 53.1079°N 0.7713°W
- Completed: c. 1774
- Client: Charles Slingsby Duncombe

Design and construction
- Architect: John Carr

Listed Building – Grade II*
- Official name: Langford Hall
- Designated: 16 January 1967
- Reference no.: 1046033

Langford Hall is a country house in Langford, Nottinghamshire, England. The house is built in the Neoclassical style and has many interesting architectural features. It is Grade II* listed and stands in 83 acres (34 ha) of parkland.

It is constructed in two storeys of red brick with ashlar dressings and standing on an ashlar plinth with a hipped slate roof. The frontage has five bays.

== History ==
The house was originally built circa 1774, probably as a hunting lodge, by John Carr of York for Charles Slingsby Duncombe (1746–1803), owner of all the land in Langford. On his death it passed to his son Charles (1764–1841), who was selected High Sheriff of Nottinghamshire for 1834. In 1832 the estate, along with that of nearby Winthorpe, was sold by the latter to Lord Middleton, who had estates in Yorkshire and owned Wollaton Hall in Nottinghamshire. A memorial tablet to Slingsby Duncombe, who afterwards lived in Bryanston Square, London, is on the interior wall of Langford Church.

The Middleton family owned Langford until 1925 when the estate was sold to Trinity College, Cambridge. During the period 1832–1939 the house was let and there were a number of tenants over the years. In 1853 it was the seat of Alfred Haffenden. In 1880–81 William Henry Coape Oates of Langford Hall was high sheriff. Sir Charles Seely, 1st Baronet resided here in 1901. In 1939 at the outbreak of the war the house was requisitioned and was occupied by the Army and later the Air Force.

In 1945 the Langford estate was sold, with Langford Hall itself being purchased by Charles Roach who established the Dolphin Preparatory school. In 1967 it was designated a Grade II* listed building, the school closed that same year. In 1968 the building was purchased by Patrick Radford CBE, who carried out a major programme of repairs completing in 1972. A large two-storey service wing was demolished and the vaulted cellars filled in.

In 2009 it became the home of the Sumsion family.

== See also ==
- Grade II* listed buildings in Nottinghamshire
- Listed buildings in Langford, Nottinghamshire
