= North Clifton =

Village and civil parish in Nottinghamshire, England

Coordinates: 53.240192°N 0.76724857°W

- Village and civil parish
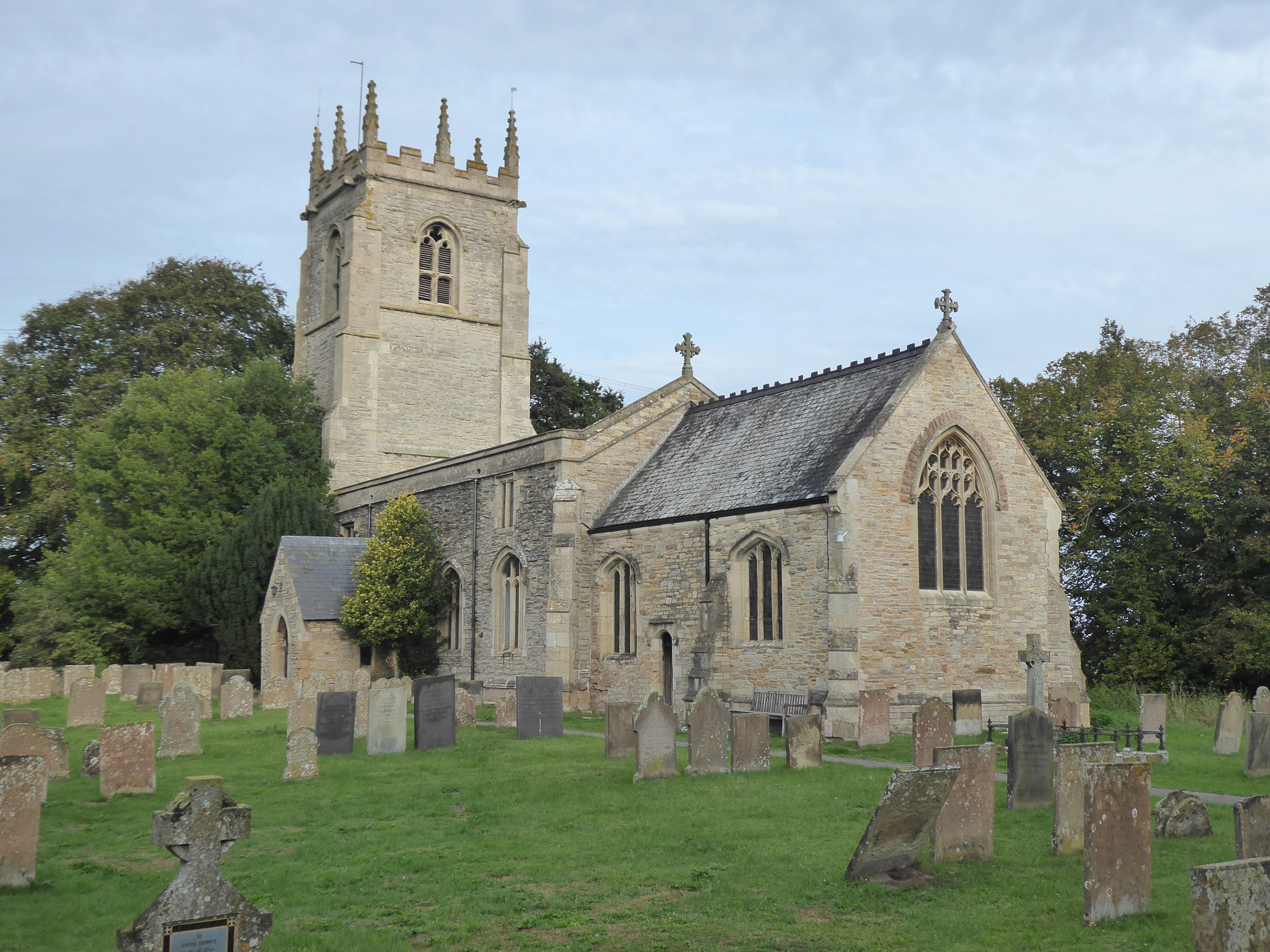
- St George Church

- Location within Nottinghamshire
- Interactive map of North Clifton
- Area: 1.73 sq mi (4.5 km^{2})
- Population: 176 (2021)
  - Density: 102/sq mi (39/km^{2})
- OS grid reference: SK 823721
  - London: 120 mi (190 km) SSE
- District: Newark and Sherwood
- Shire county: Nottinghamshire
- Region: East Midlands
- Country: England
- Sovereign state: United Kingdom
- Post town: Newark
- Postcode district: NG23
- Dialling code: 01522 / 01777
- Police: Nottinghamshire
- Fire: Nottinghamshire
- Ambulance: East Midlands
- UK Parliament: Newark

North Clifton is a village and civil parish about 12 miles north of Newark-on-Trent, in the Newark and Sherwood district, within the county of Nottinghamshire, England. In 2011, the parish had a population of 216, and this dropped to 176 at the 2021 census. The parish touches Thorney, Fledborough, Newton on Trent, South Clifton and Ragnall.

== Features ==
North Clifton has a church called St George which is Grade II* Listed. North Clifton Primary School is on Church Lane. Clifton-on-Trent railway station opened in 1897 and closed to passengers in 1955 and entirely in 1964. There are four listed buildings in North Clifton.

== History ==
The name "Clifton" means 'Cliff farm/settlement'. North and South Clifton were recorded in the Domesday Book of 1086 as Cliftone/Cliftune/Cli(s)tone. Alternative names for North Clifton are "Clifton" and "Clifton North". North Clifton parish also included the townships of South Clifton, Harby and Spalford which became separate parishes in 1866.

Francis White's Directory of Nottinghamshire of 1853 records that:

"North Clifton parish comprises the four villages and townships of North Clifton, South Clifton, Harby and Spalford, which maintain their poor separately, and contain together 1,107 inhabitants and 5.040 acres (20,400 m^{2}) of land, now valued at £6,230, which was all exonerated from tithes at the enclosure, and anciently formed four manors of the Bishop of Lincoln's fee, and one of Roger de Bisli's, which in after times passed to the Lovelots, Pigotts and Willoughbys. North Clifton is a small village on the east bank of the Trent, 12½ miles north by east of Newark, near a long cliff, in which numerous fragments of urns, bones and scalps have been found, near the spot which is supposed to have been anciently occupied by a castle. The church, dedicated to St George, stands on an eminence between North and South Clifton, and was re-pewed in 1831. The vicarage, valued in the King's books at £7 6s, and now at £176, is enjoyed by the Rev. Frederick Parry Hodges D. D. The Rev. G.C. Gordon M.A. is the curate, and resides at the Vicarage House, South Clifton. The prebendary of North Clifton, in Lincoln Cathedral, is the patron and appropriator."
