= St George the Martyr's Church, North & South Clifton =

St George's Church, North and South Clifton
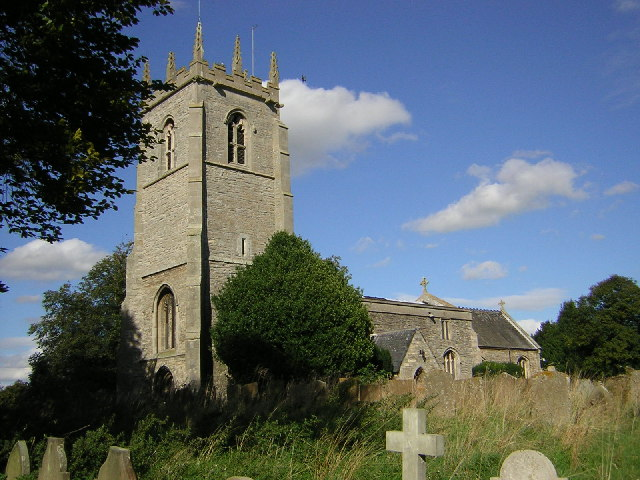
- St George's Church, North and South Clifton
- St George's Church, North and South Clifton
- 53°13′55.560″N 0°46′30.414″W
- OS grid reference: SK 81859 71259
- Location: North and South Clifton, Nottinghamshire
- Country: England
- Denomination: Church of England

History
- Dedication: St George the Martyr

Architecture
- Heritage designation: Grade II* listed

Administration
- Diocese: Diocese of Southwell and Nottingham
- Archdeaconry: Newark
- Deanery: Newark and Southwell
- Parish: Langford

St George the Martyr's Church, North and South Clifton is a Grade II* listed parish church in the Church of England in North Clifton, Nottinghamshire.

== History ==
The church dates from the 13th century.

It is part of a group of parishes which includes

- St Bartholomew's Church, Langford
- St Giles' Church, Holme
- St Cecilia's Church, Girton
- All Saints' Church, Harby
- All Saints' Church, Collingham
- St John the Baptist's Church, Collingham
- St Helena's Church, South Scarle
- Holy Trinity Church, Besthorpe
- St Helen's Church, Thorney
- All Saints' Church, Winthorpe

== See also ==
- Grade II* listed buildings in Nottinghamshire
- Listed buildings in North Clifton
