= St Helen's Church, Thorney =

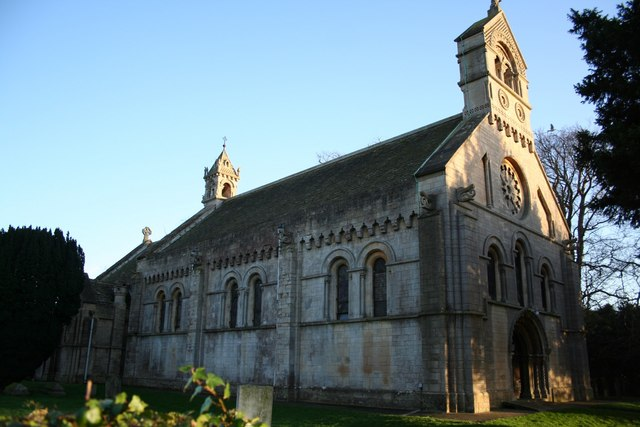
- St Helen's Church, Thorney
- St Helen's Church, Thorney
- 53°14′44.93″N 0°42′48.83″W
- OS grid reference: SK 85924 72843
- Location: Thorney, Nottinghamshire
- Country: England
- Denomination: Church of England

History
- Dedication: St Helen

Architecture
- Heritage designation: Grade II* listed
- Architect: Lewis Nockalls Cottingham
- Completed: 1850

Administration
- Diocese: Diocese of Southwell and Nottingham
- Archdeaconry: Newark
- Deanery: Newark and Southwell
- Parish: Langford

St Helen's Church is a Grade II* listed parish church in the Church of England in Thorney, Nottinghamshire.

== History ==
The church was built in 1850 by Lewis Nockalls Cottingham.

It is part of a group of parishes which includes

- St Bartholomew's Church, Langford
- St Giles' Church, Holme
- St Cecilia's Church, Girton
- All Saints' Church, Harby
- St George the Martyr's Church, North & South Clifton
- All Saints' Church, Collingham
- St John the Baptist's Church, Collingham
- St Helena's Church, South Scarle
- Holy Trinity Church, Besthorpe
- All Saints' Church, Winthorpe

== See also ==
- Grade II* listed buildings in Nottinghamshire
- Listed buildings in Thorney, Nottinghamshire
