= St John the Baptist's Church, Collingham =

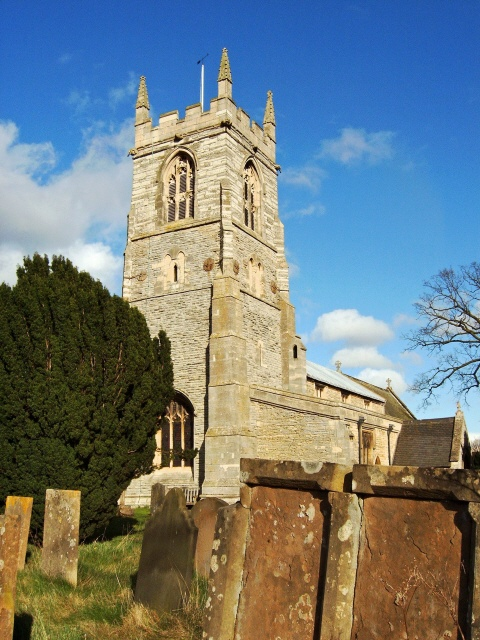
- St John the Baptist's Church, Collingham
- St John the Baptist's Church, Collingham
- 53°8′32.84″N 0°45′59.72″W
- OS grid reference: SK 82665 61311
- Location: Collingham, Nottinghamshire
- Country: England
- Denomination: Church of England

History
- Dedication: St John the Baptist

Architecture
- Heritage designation: Grade I listed

Administration
- Diocese: Diocese of Southwell and Nottingham
- Archdeaconry: Newark
- Deanery: Newark and Southwell
- Parish: Collingham

St John the Baptist's Church, Collingham is a Grade I listed parish church of the Church of England in the village of Collingham, Nottinghamshire.

== History ==
The church dates from the 12th century. Restoration work was undertaken by the Rector, Rev. Joseph Mayor, in 1846. Another restoration was carried out in 1862–1863 by J. H. Hakewill, when the gallery was removed and the arches were restored, the chancel walls raised and a new timber roof provided. Other work included stuccoing the walls, restoring memorial tablets, reglazing the windows with cathedral glass, and inserting new stone dressings. A new pulpit and lectern in pine and the altar rail in oak were installed. Tablets of zinc were fixed to the walls displaying the Ten Commandments. A number of new open benches of Memel timber were placed in the nave, to match those installed at the time of the restoration in 1846.

The tower was restored in 1886 and there was a further restoration in 1890.

== List of incumbents ==
- Walter, clerk 1186
- Geoffrey c. 1200–1216
- Giles of Alderton until 1262
- Giles de Erdyngton 1262–1269
- Richard of Rowell 1269
- John of Drax 1298
- William of London c. 1344
- William de Northalston 1336
- William Trivet
- Thomas de London 1349
- Thomas de Duffeton 1349
- Mr Richard de Rouille 1352
- William of Hauley 1354
- John of Dronsfield 1361
- Simon of Morcote 1364
- Nicholas de Barton 1366
- Mr John de Wytlesey 1405
- John Markanut
- Henry Swayne 1425
- John Floure 1445
- Thomas Curtes
- Thomas Magnus 1498
- Mr William Webbe 1504
- Robert Floyd 1523
- William Arsheleye 1557–1577
- Brian Barton 1577–1626
- George Alsopp 1626–1640
- Joseph Rhodes 1640
- Richard Farren 1640–1641
- Christopher Pickard 1641 onwards
- William Towers 1662–1665
- Thomas Hunt 1665–1667
- John Whitehall 1667–1668
- William Moulton 1668–1706
- William Malton 1706–1722
- Matthew Bradford 1722–1751
- John Fisher 1751–1752
- Robert Burne 1752–1791
- William Mackenzie 1791–1794
- John Porter 1795
- John Todhunter 1795–1803
- Christopher Wilson 1803–1807
- Joseph S Pratt 1807–1813
- Joseph Mayor 1813–1860
- Charles B Lowe 1860–1866
- Henry Mackenzie 1866–1871
- George William Fosbery 1871–1906
- Albert James Maxwell 1907–1937 (formerly vicar of St Thomas' Church, Derby)
- Graham H L Douglas Lane 1938–1968
- Rupert John Stevens 1968–1985
- Edward John Widdows 1985–1993
- Alistair Aberdein Conn 1993–2004
- William David Milner 2004–2013
- David Yabbacombe 2013 to the present

== Parish status ==
Collingham is one of a group of parishes which includes:

- St Bartholomew's Church, Langford
- St Giles' Church, Holme
- St Cecilia's Church, Girton
- All Saints' Church, Harby
- St George the Martyr's Church, North & South Clifton
- All Saints' Church, Collingham
- St Helena's Church, South Scarle
- Holy Trinity Church, Besthorpe
- St Helen's Church, Thorney
- All Saints' Church, Winthorpe

== Organ ==
The organ was enlarged by Forster and Andrews in 1863. It was replaced in 1883 by a new instrument made by Wordsworth and Maskell.

== The Bells ==
The peal of five bells dates from 1841 and was cast by Thomas Mears.

== See also ==
- Grade I listed buildings in Nottinghamshire
- Listed buildings in Collingham, Nottinghamshire
