= Listed buildings in Langford, Nottinghamshire =

Langford is a civil parish in the Newark and Sherwood district of Nottinghamshire, England. The parish contains ten listed buildings that are recorded in the National Heritage List for England. Of these, one is listed at Grade I, the highest of the three grades, two are at Grade II*, the middle grade, and the others are at Grade II, the lowest grade. The parish contains the village of Langford and the surrounding countryside, and the listed buildings consist of a church, houses and associated structures, farmhouses, and two cottages.

== Key ==
| Grade | Criteria |
|---|---|
| I | Buildings of exceptional interest, sometimes considered to be internationally important |
| II* | Particularly important buildings of more than special interest |
| II | Buildings of national importance and special interest |

== Buildings ==
| Name and location | Photograph | Date | Notes | Grade |
|---|---|---|---|---|
| St Bartholomew's Church; 53.12262°N 0.77445°W | | 13th century | The church has been altered and expanded through the centuries, including a restoration in 1862. It is built in stone, partly rendered, the chancel has a tile roof, and elsewhere are pantile roofs. The church consists of a nave with a north clerestory, a south aisle, a south porch, a chancel, and a west tower. The tower has two stages, quoins, lancet windows, and two-light bell openings, above which is a carved head on each corner, an embattled parapet, and crocketed pinnacles on the corners. | I |
| Langford Old Hall; 53.12069°N 0.77528°W | — | Early 17th century | Originally a hunting lodge, later a house, it is in limestone on a chamfered plinth, with quoins, a moulded floor band, and a tile roof. There are two storeys and attics, and three bays. On the front is a projecting two-storey porch with rusticated jambs, moulded impost blocks, and an arch with a keystone and two projecting voussoirs, above which is a moulded hood. Over this is a mullioned and transomed window, and the other widows are cross-casements. | II* |
| Elmtree Farmhouse; 53.11561°N 0.77276°W | — | c. 1700 | The farmhouse is in stone with red brick dressings, quoins, and a roof of pantile and tile with brick coped tumbled gables. There are two storeys and attics, six bays, and a rear lean-to. The doorway and the windows, most of which are horizontally-sliding sashes, have segmental brick arches. | II |
| Langford House Farmhouse; 53.11446°N 0.77373°W | | c. 1700 | The farmhouse is in stone with red brick dressings, quoins, and a tile roof with brick coped tumbled gables. There are two storeys and attics, five bays, and a brick lean-to at the north with a slate roof. On the front is a doorway with a plain surround and a rectangular fanlight, the windows are casements, and the ground floor openings are under segmental brick arches. | II |
| The Dairy Farmhouse; 53.11304°N 0.77457°W | — | c. 1700 | The farmhouse is in stone with red brick dressings, quoins, and a roof of pantile and tile with brick coped tumbled gables. There are two storeys and attics, four bays, a lean-to on the left, and later two-storey brick extensions at the rear. The doorway and the windows, which are casements, have segmental brick arches. | II |
| Bradshaw Cottage; 53.11691°N 0.77252°W | — | Early 18th century | The cottage is in brick with a floor band, dogtooth eaves, and a pantile roof with coped gables and kneelers. There is a single story and attic, a main range of three bays, and a rear wing with an outshut. The central doorway has a plain surround, the windows are horizontally-sliding sashes, and all the openings have segmental arches. | II |
| Langford Hall; 53.10793°N 0.77133°W | — | c. 1780–90 | A country house designed by John Carr, in chequered brick, on a stone plinth, with a floor band, and a hipped slate roof. There are three storeys and seven bays, the middle three bay projecting under a pediment, with garlands and swags in the tympanum. Five steps lead up to the central porch that has Doric columns, a fluted frieze, and a pediment with a decorated cornice, and a doorway with a traceried fanlight. The windows are sashes, those in the middle floor over balusters. | II* |
| Coach house, Langford Hall; 53.10816°N 0.77231°W | — | c. 1780–90 | The coach house, designed by John Carr, is in brick with stone dressings, a floor band, an impost band, an eaves band, and a hipped slate roof. There are three ranges, the outer ranges with a single storey, and the middle range projecting slightly, and with a loft. The middle range has three arches with doorways and casement windows above, and in the outer ranges are arched windows and doorways. | II |
| Stables, Langford Hall; 53.10805°N 0.77191°W | — | c. 1780–90 | The stable block, designed by John Carr, is in red brick with stone dressings, a sill band and a hipped slate roof. The main range has a single storey and a loft and five bays, and is flanked by single-storey single-bay wings. The middle three bays project under a pediment with a cornice, and contain a double door, over which is a decorated panel and a fanlight, and above these is a clock. The windows in the central range are sashes, the outer bay on the east contains a casement window and the west bay has a fixed window. | II |
| Langford Crossing Gate House; 53.12232°N 0.77689°W | | Mid 19th century | The railway cottage is in painted brick, with a sill band, and a hipped slate roof with projecting eaves on wooden brackets, and two storeys. On the front is a projecting gabled porch, and a doorway with a segmental arch and a fanlight. The windows are casements. | II |
