= Besthorpe, Nottinghamshire =

Village in Nottinghamshire, England

Coordinates: 53.173°N 0.767°W

Besthorpe
- Village and civil parish
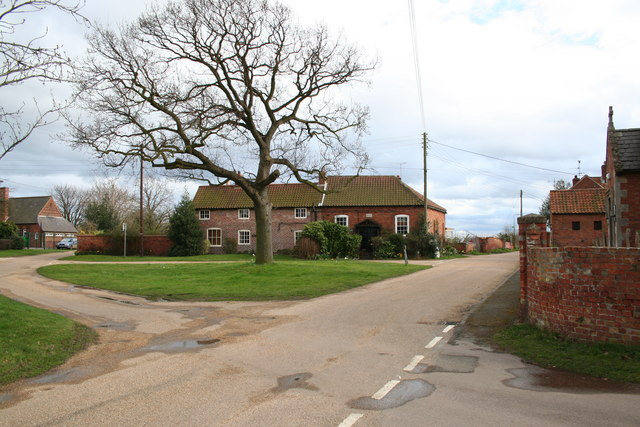
- The old Chapel and Chapel Cottage at Besthorpe

- Location within Nottinghamshire
- Interactive map of Besthorpe
- Area: 2.03 sq mi (5.3 km^{2})
- Population: 212 (2021)
  - Density: 104/sq mi (40/km^{2})
- OS grid reference: SK 825647
  - London: 115 mi (185 km) SSE
- District: Newark and Sherwood
- Shire county: Nottinghamshire
- Region: East Midlands
- Country: England
- Sovereign state: United Kingdom
- Post town: Newark-on-Trent
- Postcode district: NG23
- Dialling code: 01636
- Police: Nottinghamshire
- Fire: Nottinghamshire
- Ambulance: East Midlands
- UK Parliament: Newark-on-Trent
- Website: besthorpe.org.uk

Besthorpe is a small village in north-east Nottinghamshire close to the border with Lincolnshire. It is a civil parish in the Newark & Sherwood district of Nottinghamshire. The population of the civil parish as of the 2011 census was 195, increasing to 212 at the 2021 census. The village is on the A1133 between Newark and Gainsborough, and is 1.5 miles north of the larger village of Collingham, north east of Newark on Trent. The village lies 1 mile east of the River Trent and the River Fleet flows south to east parallel with the village & A1133. Besthorpe acquired Conservation Village status in 2006 because it has maintained much of its original layout focused on Low Road and the Green.

== Etymology ==
Besthorpe's name is derived from the Scandinavian word ‘thorpe’ meaning outlying farmstead or hamlet and probably the name of a key character called something like ‘Bosi’. It indicates that there was sufficient settlement here in the period of the Danelaw in the 10th century to give the place a name. Parishes and their boundaries were to be well established by the time of the Domesday Book in 1086.

== Geography ==
Two key environments meet in Besthorpe. To the north and east the East Nottinghamshire Sandlands are an increasingly rare habitat supporting grass heaths, bracken, gorse and broom with mixed small-scale plantations of birch, oak and Scots pine. The River Fleet and the fields to the west are part of the Trent Washlands which provide the village with its River Meadowlands landscape of meadow and river pastures, extensive grasslands and meandering river channels.

The Millennium Wood, alongside the A1133, was planted originally in 2000 and bluebells were added to mark the Diamond Jubilee in 2012. A current clearance project aims to keep this Wood accessible for leisure use.

=== Besthorpe Nature Reserve ===
The Nottinghamshire Wildlife Trust has spent many years reworking old sand and gravel quarries into a nature reserve (officially opened in June 2011) with over 100 species of birds recorded including key colonies of tree-nesting great cormorants, a major heronry and sand martins. In 2013 a number of little egrets raised their chicks there – at the time considered to be the most northerly such colony in the UK. The Nature Reserve and car park is accessible from Trent Lane with a nearby SSSI meadow having great burnet plants, together with Yorkshire fog and meadow foxtail grass species. In the spring a range of wild flowers including orchids can be found around the reserve.

== History ==
=== Prehistory ===
Palaeolithic (Old Stone Age) hunter-gatherers are known to have occupied caves at Creswell Crags on the Notts/Derbys border near Worksop for thousands of years down to 10,000 BC. By this time they used a distinctive range of flint and stone tools examples of which have been found at Farndon – possibly a temporary summer hunting camp.

During the Mesolithic (Middle Stone Age) the Trent Valley became a multi-channelled river system with extensive wetlands and developed a heavily forested landscape. A detailed pollen sequence taken from a peat-filled former river channel at Girton has revealed changes in the floral environment between 7000 BC and 1000 BC. Fieldwalking at Collingham prior to quarrying produced a high density of flintwork from c 5000 BC along the edge of what was then a gravel island and this would be associated with the activities of hunter-gatherers living off the natural food resources of the Valley.

The Neolithic (New Stone Age) is linked with the introduction of farming as the major source of food and a degree of more settled existence. Traces of settlement are notoriously difficult to find and indeed no evidence has been found in our area. However at Langford Lowfields in Collingham archaeologists excavated what they described as a ‘log jam’ in a former channel of the Trent where flooding in c 2000BC had swept away material from a site upstream only for it to be held up by fallen trees. Animal bones revealed evidence for cattle, pig, wild boar, red and roe deer, horse, dog and sheep and human remains including skulls lodged in the debris were interpreted as coming from a funerary or ritual site disturbed by the floods. The population was increasing with a complex network of social relationships uniting widely dispersed mobile or sedentary groups some of whom must have passed by or even temporarily set up home in Besthorpe even if we don't have firm evidence of their presence.

The Bronze Age produced evidence at Girton of a burnt mound. This oval pile of burnt stones some 10–12 metres in diameter and 0.4 metres high can be linked to heating water and probably cooking. Other archaeological evidence is in the form of a ‘pit alignment’ examined in Besthorpe Quarry in the 1990s; this consisted of a line of deep pits dug presumably to support large posts and usually interpreted as being significant of boundaries or divisions in the landscape. As the alignment was away from any contemporary settlement and its domestic rubbish no finds were made to assist dating.

By the later stages of the Iron Age (1st century BC) and into the Roman Period (after 43 AD) a sizeable community had established itself at Ferry Lane Farm between Collingham and Besthorpe. Excavations by Manchester and Salford Universities took place for several summers until 2012. Though there is no suggestion of any significant material wealth, the site revealed a well-ordered system of rectilinear fields, closely spaced enclosures and trackways supporting theories of a relative increase in population densities. Similar sites have been recorded by aerial photography.

=== Roman ===
Along the east side of the Valley were a range of farmstead settlements but not ‘villas’. Fieldwalking next to A1133 just south of Besthorpe revealed a dense scatter of pottery indicating one of the sites on an elevated gravel terrace safe from flooding. These sites would have had links with the Roman road system (Fosse Way) and traded to a degree with the ‘small town’ at Crococalana (Brough) and the larger urban centre of Lindum (Lincoln).

At Meering there are suggestions of possible pottery kilns and a hoard of 1,347 Roman coins was found in 1964 by workers in the gravel pits at Besthorpe. Study of the coins which had been crammed into a pot showed that the dateable sequence ended abruptly in 354AD. A first century AD pot was discovered in a house foundation trench at Trent Lane.

In later Roman times climatic deterioration lead to flooding and some sites like Ferry Lane Farm were buried under alluvium while others were covered by sand-blown deposits – we still have episodes of sand-blow which can cause significant build-up at field edges and on the A1133.

=== Post-Roman ===
In post-Roman times the area continued to be settled with the best excavated evidence coming from a site just 500 metres north of Girton. Here a settlement with wattle and daub buildings situated across the crest of a sand dune was occupied between about 650 and 815AD and archaeologists found evidence of textile processing with the discovery of loomweights and spindle whorls. The Scandinavian period is also marked in Girton churchyard by a monumental grave cover dated to c 1000AD.

The Parish system established prior to 1086AD tends to create linear parishes perpendicular to the river allowing each to have its share of meadow, arable, pasture, woodland and water. The Fleet is considered to be one medieval course of the river.

In 1976 excavations in a garden off Trent Lane discovered a small house with low stone walls and a red clay floor outside of which had been a midden. Pottery found included green glazed fragments of jugs made in Lincoln and capable of being dated to c1250AD. Archaeologists were able to restore an almost complete cooking pot which had been broken at this period and thrown away on the midden. The soot from the open fire on which it was used was still visible on its side.

Church records state that the current Victorian church was built in 1844 to replace a Chapel of Ease which was built about 1535AD and fell into disuse after 1760. The stone foundations of the east end of this stone chapel were located during the redevelopment of the church for the Besthorpe Project in 2013.

At Mill Farm are the remains of a Windmill, consisting of the oak post, quarter bars and cross trees of a Post mill inside a brick roundhouse, now used as a store. Besthorpe Mill was built c. 1832, and ceased working by 1909 although the sails and machinery remained intact until at least the 1930s. In 1899 the miller Charles Merriman committed suicide inside the mill by cutting his throat. According to a tenant, Ron Wilkinson, who moved into the mill house in the 1930s the roundhouse floorboards were bloodstained. They were later concreted over.

== Holy Trinity Church, Besthorpe ==
Holy Trinity Church was built in 1844 to replace an old Chapel of Ease built circa 1535, for St Helena's Church, South Scarle and which fell into ruins in 1760. There is evidence that it was dismantled between 1760 and 1770 with various mentions of the sale of bells and bell ropes to South Scarle.

A school was built from the ruins of the church and completed in 1734. “ Its [the church's] alteration into a school house is thought to have been affected about AD 1734. That such a transformation did take place is testified by a pillar of the old church which has been built into an inner wall of the school master's dwelling" The school was established under the will of George Carver, who in 1709 bequeathed an annual sum of £5 for educating the poor children of Besthorpe. This information is shown on the stone which was set into the new school building in 1845 and remains in place today.

In 1844, part of the land on which the school stood was transferred to form the site of the new chapel. There is evidence that the church was partly rebuilt in 1897 at a cost of £215. The original wooden window frames were replaced with stone and tinted glass. The floor was concreted and a new pulpit provided.

The church is unusual in that it is aligned North to South with the altar being at the south end in the apse.

The school was demolished, leaving the master's house abutting onto the new chapel and a new school built in 1845 and run under the auspices of the National Society. The master's house was demolished in 1919. Another new school was built in 1879 and the former National School building became the current Village Hall

There used to be a Quaker meeting room in the Village but when, in 1986, the Methodist Chapel closed, Holy Trinity was left as the only building for Christian worship.

The Church and Boundary Wall are Grade II listed

=== The English Heritage description ===
Parish Church 1844: brick with Welsh slate and stone slab roofs, stone dressings, coped gables with kneelers. Nave with apse, gabled porch, bell turret. East front has central porch with coped gable and cross, four centred archway doorway with label mould and close boarded door flanked by two double lancets with Y tracery. Apse has 3 singlet lancets and pitched roof. Bell turret has single lancet on each side, modillioned eaves, pyramidal slab roof with cross. Interior rendered except window reveals. Brick chancel arch with moulded ashlar soffit, responds and quoins. At North end, two wood cased columns supporting bell turret. Nave roof has tie beam with three decorative pendants, supported by curved brackets and carved wooden corbels. Queen posts with arch braces to purlins and curved brackets forming mouchettes in spandrels. Apse roof semi circular with common rafters. Plain deal 19th century pews, communion rail 1898. Boundary wall, brick with cast iron coping carrying ornate cast iron railing and gate

=== The church today ===
In 1984 Holy Trinity became part of the combined parish of South Scarle, Girton and Besthorpe and subsequently one of the eleven churches of the East Trent Group. We are part of the Newark Deanery in the Diocese of Southwell & Nottingham (opens a new window)

With the closure of the school in 2009, the church and village hall next to it are the only public buildings left in the village.

The Bell Tower has been refurbished through grants from a number of organisations and from money raised by the village. A grant from English Heritage and fund raising by the village has meant that a new roof was completed in 2009.

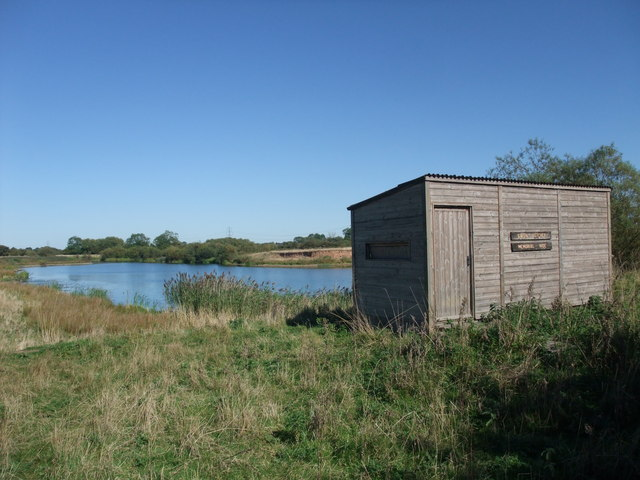
Memorial Hide at Besthorpe Nature Reserve

== See also ==
- Listed buildings in Besthorpe, Nottinghamshire

== External sites ==
- YouTube video - parish visit journal
