= St Bartholomew's Church, Langford =

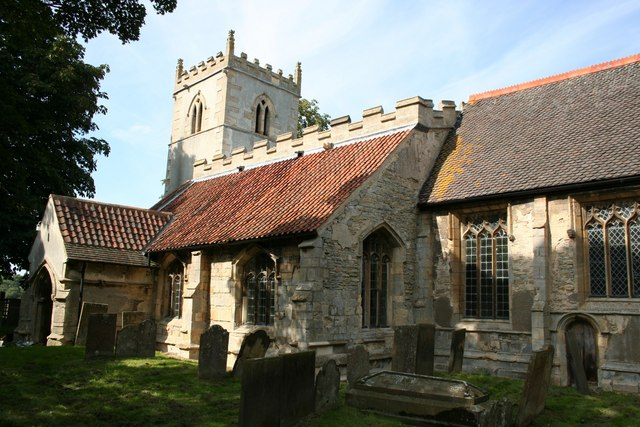
- St Bartholomew's Church, Langford
- St Bartholomew's Church, Langford
- 53°7′21.94″N 0°46′28.55″W
- OS grid reference: SK 82114 59079
- Location: Langford, Nottinghamshire
- Country: England
- Denomination: Church of England

History
- Dedication: St Bartholomew

Architecture
- Heritage designation: Grade I listed

Administration
- Diocese: Diocese of Southwell and Nottingham
- Archdeaconry: Newark
- Deanery: Newark and Southwell
- Parish: Langford

St Bartholomew's Church, Langford is a Grade I listed parish church in the Church of England in Langford, Nottinghamshire.

== History ==
The church dates from the 13th century, and was restored in 1862.

It is part of a group of parishes which includes

- St Giles' Church, Holme
- St Cecilia's Church, Girton
- All Saints' Church, Harby
- St George the Martyr's Church, North & South Clifton
- All Saints' Church, Collingham
- St John the Baptist's Church, Collingham
- St Helena's Church, South Scarle
- Holy Trinity Church, Besthorpe
- St Helen's Church, Thorney
- All Saints' Church, Winthorpe

== See also ==
- Grade I listed buildings in Nottinghamshire
- Listed buildings in Langford, Nottinghamshire
