= St Giles' Church, Holme =

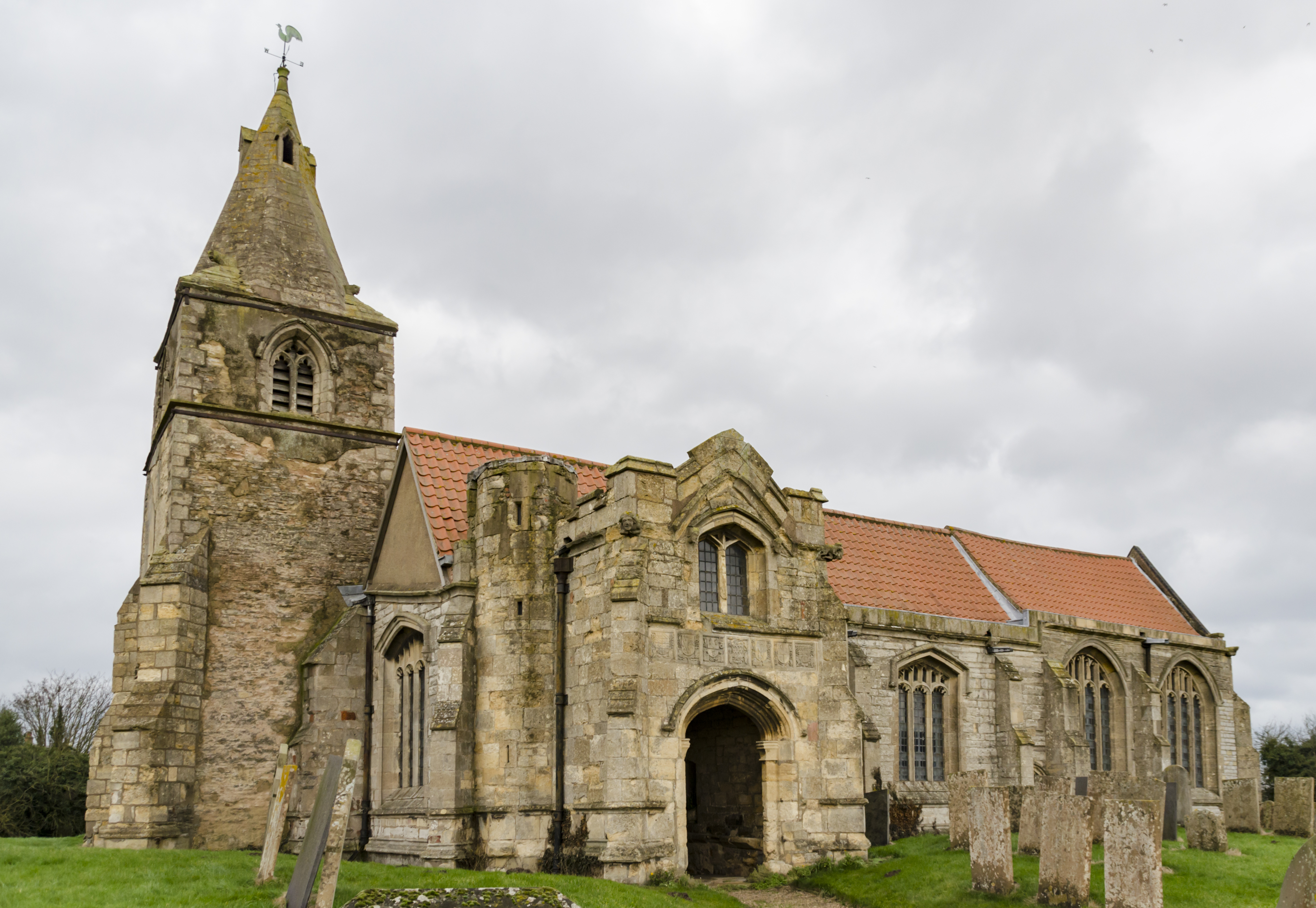
- St Giles' Church, Holme
- St Giles' Church, Holme
- 53°7′23.90″N 0°48′5.43″W
- OS grid reference: SK 80281 59107
- Location: Holme, Nottinghamshire
- Country: England
- Denomination: Church of England

History
- Dedication: St Giles

Architecture
- Heritage designation: Grade I listed

Administration
- Diocese: Diocese of Southwell and Nottingham
- Archdeaconry: Newark
- Deanery: Newark and Southwell
- Parish: Langford

St Giles' Church, Holme is a Grade I listed parish church in the Church of England in Holme, Nottinghamshire.

== History ==
The church dates from the 12th century, and was largely rebuilt in the early 15th century by John Barton.

It is part of a group of parishes which includes

- St Bartholomew's Church, Langford
- St Cecilia's Church, Girton
- All Saints' Church, Harby
- St George the Martyr's Church, North & South Clifton
- All Saints' Church, Collingham
- St John the Baptist's Church, Collingham
- St Helena's Church, South Scarle
- Holy Trinity Church, Besthorpe
- St Helen's Church, Thorney
- All Saints' Church, Winthorpe

== Cadaver tomb ==
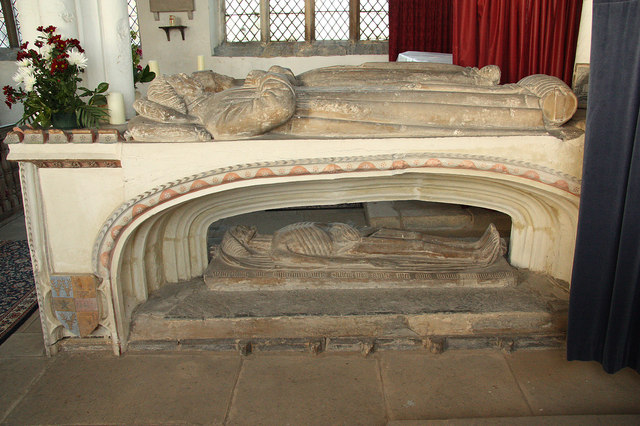
The cadaver tomb of John Barton

The church is noted for the founder's cadaver tomb. John Barton was a prosperous wool merchant who died in 1491. His wealth accumulated from sheep was acknowledged in stone and stained-glass in his now-gone home 'I thank God and ever shall, It is the shepe that hath payed for all' (sic) he founded St. Giles' church and built his tomb during his lifetime with his memento mori below. At his feet is his rebus - a barrel (tun) with a bar across it for 'Barton'.

== See also ==
- Grade I listed buildings in Nottinghamshire
- Listed buildings in Holme, Nottinghamshire
