= Listed buildings in North Clifton =

North Clifton is a civil parish in the Newark and Sherwood district of Nottinghamshire, England. The parish contains four listed buildings that are recorded in the National Heritage List for England. Of these, one is listed at Grade II*, the middle of the three grades, and the others are at Grade II, the lowest grade. The parish contains the village of North Clifton and the surrounding area, and consist of a church and associated structures, and two farmhouses.

== Key ==
Grade	Criteria
II*	Particularly important buildings of more than special interest
II	Buildings of national importance and special interest

== Buildings ==
Name and location	Photograph	Date	Notes	Grade
St George the Martyr's Church; 53.23210°N 0.77517°W		13th century	The church has been altered and extended through the centuries. It is built in blue lias, and has roofs of Welsh slate and lead. The church consists of a nave, a north aisle, a south porch, a chancel, a vestry and a west tower. The tower has three stages, a plinth, diagonal buttresses, string courses, and a moulded embattled parapet with eight crocketed pinnacles. There is a west door with a hood mould, over which is a triple lancet window, and paired bell openings with hood moulds.	II*
Hall Farmhouse; 53.23924°N 0.76734°W	—	c. 1700	The farmhouse is in colourwashed brick on a plinth, with a floor band, dentilled eaves, and a pantile roof with coped gables. There are two storeys and attics, and three bays. In the centre is a doorway, to its east is a canted bay window, above it is a casement window, and the other windows are sashes.	II
Trent Lane Farmhouse; 53.24044°N 0.76940°W		Mid 18th century	The farmhouse is in brick on a plinth, with dentilled eaves, and a pantile roof with coped gables. There are two storeys and attics, and four bays. In the ground floor are casement windows with segmental heads, and the upper floor contains two horizontally-sliding sash windows and a casement window.	II
Lychgate and railings, St George the Martyr's Church; 53.23202°N 0.77442°W		Mid 19th century	Enclosing the churchyard is a dwarf gault brick wall with cast iron coping and wrought iron railings, extending for about 30 metres (98 ft). At the entrance is a decorative wrought iron lych gate with a curved sheet metal frieze inscribed with a biblical text. On the gable is a decorative wrought iron cross.	II
