= Listed buildings in Holme, Nottinghamshire =

Holme is a civil parish in the Newark and Sherwood district of Nottinghamshire, England. The parish contains four listed buildings that are recorded in the National Heritage List for England. Of these, one is listed at Grade I, the highest of the three grades, and the others are at Grade II, the lowest grade. The parish contains the village of Holme and the surrounding area. All the listed buildings are in the village, and consist of a church, the remains of the village cross, a house, and its associated stable block.

== Key ==
Grade	Criteria
I	Buildings of exceptional interest, sometimes considered to be internationally important
II	Buildings of national importance and special interest

== Buildings ==
Name and location	Photograph	Date	Notes	Grade
St Giles' Church; 53.12314°N 0.80182°W		13th century	The church has been altered and extended through the centuries, with most of it dating from the 15th century, and it was restored in 1932. It is built in stone with pantile roofs, and consists of a nave, a south aisle, a south porch, a south chapel, a chancel and a west steeple. The steeple has a tower dating from the 13th century, with two stages, diagonal buttresses, string courses, a four-light west window with a hood mould, two-light bell openings, and a broach spire with four carved heads at the base and four lucarnes. The porch has two storeys and a shaped gable, diagonal buttresses with gargoyles, and an arched doorway with moulded capitals, and a hood mould over which are seven carved shields and a two-light window. In the angle to the west is a circular stair turret.	I
Village cross 53.12303°N 0.80341°W		14th century	The cross consists of a stone with a socket and a small piece of the shaft.	II
Holme Hall; 53.12415°N 0.80247°W	—	c. 1800	The house is in red brick with a hipped slate roof. The main range has two storeys and attics, and a symmetrical front of three bays, and at the rear is a three-storey three-bay extension. The central doorway has a plain surround and a rectangular fanlight, and the windows are sashes. On the front is a sun porch.	II
Stable block, Holme Hall; 53.12442°N 0.80283°W	—	c. 1800	The stable block is in red brick with a hipped pantile roof. There are three bays and a single storey with a loft over the middle bay, which contains a stable door flanked by casement windows, and a loft door above. Each outer bay contains a double door, and the south bay has a clock face.	II
