= All Saints' Church, Collingham =

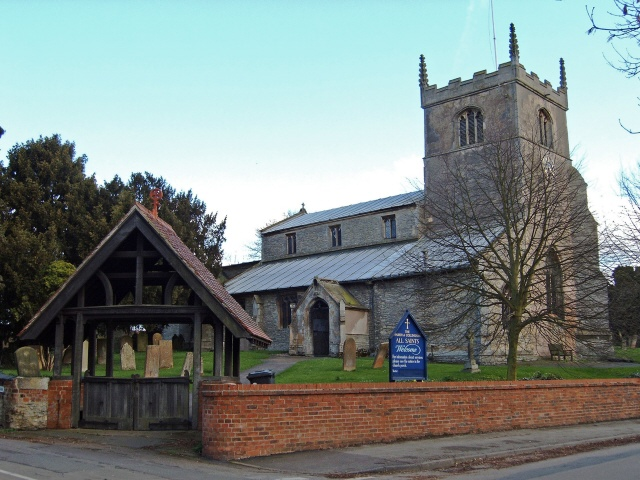
- All Saints' Church, Collingham
- All Saints' Church, Collingham
- 53°8′55.32″N 0°45′42.92″W
- OS grid reference: SK 82974 62044
- Location: Collingham, Nottinghamshire
- Country: England
- Denomination: Church of England

History
- Dedication: All Saints

Architecture
- Heritage designation: Grade I listed

Administration
- Diocese: Diocese of Southwell and Nottingham
- Archdeaconry: Newark
- Deanery: Newark and Southwell
- Parish: Collingham

All Saints' Church, Collingham is a Grade I listed parish church in the Church of England in Collingham, Nottinghamshire.

== History ==
The church dates from the 12th century.

It is part of a group of parishes which includes

- St Bartholomew's Church, Langford
- St Giles' Church, Holme
- St Cecilia's Church, Girton
- All Saints' Church, Harby
- St George the Martyr's Church, North & South Clifton
- St John the Baptist's Church, Collingham
- St Helena's Church, South Scarle
- Holy Trinity Church, Besthorpe
- St Helen's Church, Thorney
- All Saints' Church, Winthorpe

== Clock ==
In 1867 the church received a new turret clock by Reuben Bosworth of Nottingham. It struck the hours and the quarters. An inscription on the clock read "Presented by Mrs. Lesiter, widow of the Rev. Charles Lesiter, late vicar of this parish, May 1867".

== See also ==
- Grade I listed buildings in Nottinghamshire
- Listed buildings in Collingham, Nottinghamshire
