= Spalford =

Hamlet and civil parish in Nottinghamshire, England

Coordinates: 53.21275°N 0.74845°W

- Hamlet and civil parish
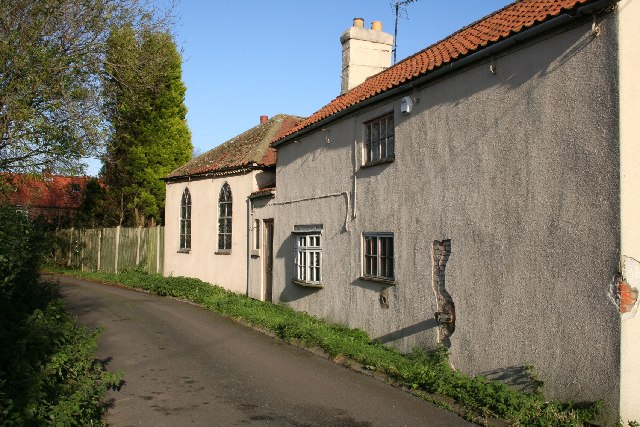
- Spalford Chapel

- Location within Nottinghamshire
- Interactive map of Spalford
- Area: 1.62 sq mi (4.2 km^{2})
- Population: 91 (2021 census)
  - Density: 56/sq mi (22/km^{2})
- OS grid reference: SK 8369
  - London: 120 mi (190 km) SSE
- District: Newark and Sherwood
- Shire county: Nottinghamshire
- Region: East Midlands
- Country: England
- Sovereign state: United Kingdom
- Post town: NOTTINGHAM
- Postcode district: NG23
- Dialling code: 01522 / 01636
- Police: Nottinghamshire
- Fire: Nottinghamshire
- Ambulance: East Midlands
- UK Parliament: Newark

Spalford is a hamlet and civil parish in the Newark and Sherwood district of Nottinghamshire, England. Spalford was listed in the Domesday Book (1086) as 'Spaldesforde'.

The hamlet is located between South Clifton and Weecar near the county boundary with Lincolnshire, north of Newark-on-Trent. Spalford was a township in the parish of North Clifton, it became a separate parish in 1866.

According to the 2001 census it had a population of 85. 20 years later, 91 residents were reported at the 2021 census.

To the west of the parish is the River Trent, and to the south is the Local nature reserve and Site of Special Scientific Interest known as Spalford Warren. The reserve habitat is made up of blown sand heathland, which is rare in Nottinghamshire.

== Spalford Floodbank ==
In 1795 during the largest known flood on the Trent, the floodbank which is situated between Spalford and the river was breached. Floodwaters from the breach spread out across the low-lying land, even reaching the River Witham and flooding Lincoln. Some 20,000 acres were flooded for a period of over three weeks. A description of the breach was given as follows:

The bank is formed upon a plain of sandy nature, and when it was broken in 1795, the water forced an immense breach, the size of which may be judged from the fact that eighty loads of faggots and upwards of four hundred tons of earth were required to fill up the hole, an operation which took several weeks to complete.

The flood bank was subsequently strengthened and repaired, following further Trent floods in 1824 and 1852.

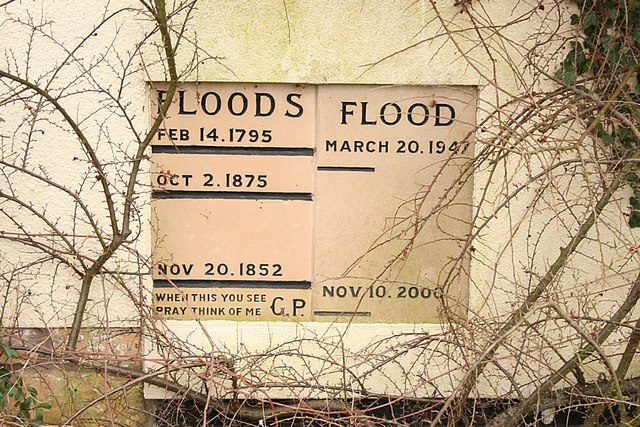
Flood marker at nearby Girton showing the height of the 1795 flood and others

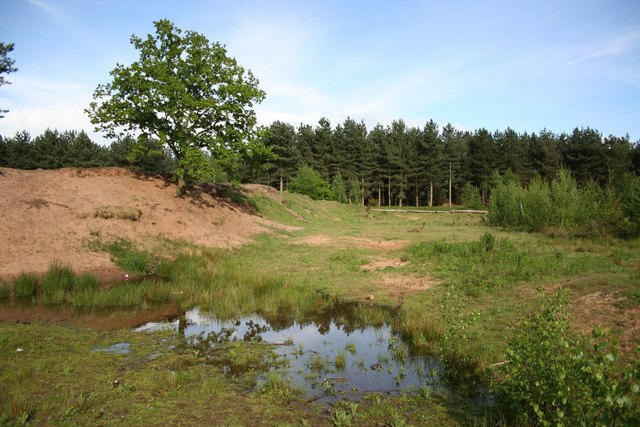
Spalford Warren
