= Listed buildings in South Clifton =

South Clifton is a civil parish in the Newark and Sherwood district of Nottinghamshire, England. The parish contains eight listed buildings that are recorded in the National Heritage List for England. All the listed buildings are designated at Grade II, the lowest of the three grades, which is applied to "buildings of national importance and special interest". The parish contains the village of South Clifton and the surrounding area. All the listed buildings are in the village, and they consist of houses, a farmhouse, and associated structures, including a pigeoncote.

== Buildings ==
Name and location	Photograph	Date	Notes
Vine House; 53.22391°N 0.77148°W		17th century	The house is in brick on a tarred plinth, with a floor band, an eaves band, and a steeply pitched tile roof with tumbling on the north gable. There are two storeys and an L-shaped plan, with a front range of four bays. The doorway has a gabled hood on brackets with bargeboards, and to the right is a small casement window. The other windows are horizontally-sliding sashes, those in the ground floor with segmental heads.
The Old Farmhouse; 53.22270°N 0.77124°W		c. 1700	The farmhouse is in brick on a plinth, with a floor band, cogged eaves, an eaves band on the gable, and a steeply pitched pantile roof with coped gables. There are two storeys and attics and an L-shaped plan, with a front range of three bays and a rear wing. In the centre is a doorway with a moulded surround, and the windows are sashes with segmental heads. At the rear is a porch with a hipped tile roof, and casement windows.
Pigeoncote, The Old Farm; 53.22249°N 0.77077°W	—	Mid 18th century	The pigeoncote is in brick with vitrified headers, cogged eaves, and a steeply pitched pantile roof with brick coped gables. There are two storeys and a square plan, and on the north side is a stable door and a vent, above which are blocked pigeonholes.
The Old Schoolhouse; 53.22349°N 0.76934°W		c. 1800	The house is in brick with patterned headers and a hipped pantile roof. There are two storeys and three bays. The central doorway has a plain surround, it is flanked by horizontally-sliding sash windows with segmental heads, and in the upper floor are sash windows, those in the outer bays with segmental heads.
Bonington; 53.22234°N 0.76859°W	—	Early 19th century	The cottage is in brick with pale headers, a floor band, cogged eaves, and a pantile roof with coped gables and tumbling. There are two storeys, three bays, and a later two-storey extension to the east. In the centre is a porch, and the windows are sashes with segmental heads.
The Manor House; 53.22405°N 0.77118°W		Early 19th century	A brick house with a pantile roof, it has two storeys and an L-shaped plan, with a front range of three bays. The central doorway has a moulded surround and a hood on scrolled brackets, and the windows are sashes with rubbed brick heads.
The Hall and rear extension 53.22306°N 0.77160°W		Mid 19th century	The house is stuccoed, on a stone plinth, with moulded eaves and lintels, and a hipped slate roof. There are two storeys, three bays, a square plan, and a rear extension. In the centre is a doorway with pilasters, an entablature, and a rectangular fanlight, and the windows are sashes. On the south front is a square bay window with a cornice and a lead roof. The middle bay of the north front projects, and contains a doorway and a horizontally-sliding sash window.
Stables, The Hall; 53.22324°N 0.77156°W	—	Mid 19th century	The stable block, which has been converted for residential use, is in brick with a hipped Welsh slate roof. There is a single storey and three bays, the middle bay projecting under a gable containing carriage doors. In the left bay is a mullioned and transomed casement window, and two doorways with segmental heads, and the right bay contains a door with a fanlight.
