= St Cecilia's Church, Girton =

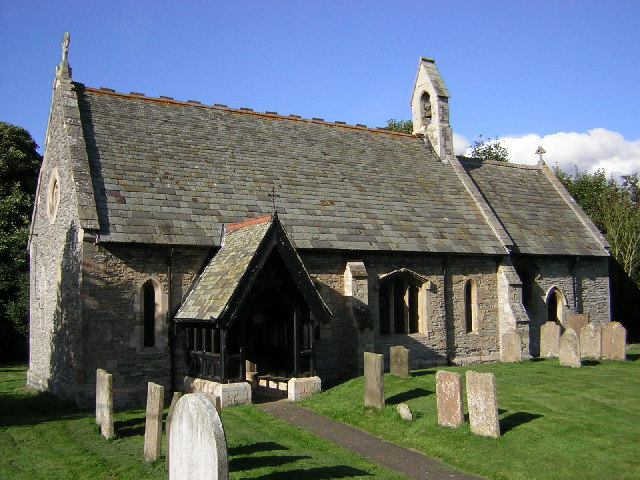
- St Cecilia's Church, Girton
- St Cecilia's Church, Girton
- 53°11′21.13″N 0°46′0.28″W
- OS grid reference: SK 82536 66205
- Location: Girton, Nottinghamshire
- Country: England
- Denomination: Church of England

History
- Dedication: St Cecilia

Architecture
- Heritage designation: Grade II listed

Administration
- Diocese: Diocese of Southwell and Nottingham
- Archdeaconry: Newark
- Deanery: Newark and Southwell
- Parish: Langford

St Cecilia's Church, Girton is a Grade II listed parish church in the Church of England in Girton, Nottinghamshire.

== History ==
The church dates from the 13th century, and was largely rebuilt in 1879 by Ewan Christian..

It is part of a group of parishes which includes

- St Bartholomew's Church, Langford
- St Giles' Church, Holme
- All Saints' Church, Harby
- St George the Martyr's Church, North & South Clifton
- All Saints' Church, Collingham
- St John the Baptist's Church, Collingham
- St Helena's Church, South Scarle
- Holy Trinity Church, Besthorpe
- St Helen's Church, Thorney
- All Saints' Church, Winthorpe

== See also ==
- Listed buildings in Girton, Nottinghamshire
