= Listed buildings in Besthorpe, Nottinghamshire =

Besthorpe is a civil parish in the Newark and Sherwood district of Nottinghamshire, England. The parish contains eleven listed buildings that are recorded in the National Heritage List for England. All the listed buildings are designated at Grade II, the lowest of the three grades, which is applied to "buildings of national importance and special interest". The parish contains the village of Besthorpe and the surrounding countryside, and the listed buildings consist of houses, farmhouses and associated structures, two churches, and a former post mill.

== Buildings ==
Name and location	Photograph	Date	Notes
Slacks Farmhouse; 53.17391°N 0.76641°W		16th century	The farmhouse is in blue lias stone and brick, and has a pantile roof with coped gables. There are two storeys and attics, and an L-shaped plan. In the angle is a gabled porch, and the windows are casements with segmental heads.
Chestnut Cottage; 53.17422°N 0.76664°W	—	Late 17th century	A farmhouse in brick with burnt headers on a plinth, with dentilled eaves, and a pantile roof with coped gables and kneelers. There are two storeys and three bays. In the ground floor are casement windows and a bow window, and the upper floor contains two-light horizontally-sliding sash windows. To the east is a later brick outbuilding with a single storey and three bays.
Stable, Chestnut Cottage; 53.17422°N 0.76678°W	—	Late 17th century	The stable, with a pigeoncote above, is in brick with burnt headers, on a plinth, and has dentilled eaves, and a pantile roof with a coped gable. There are two storeys and a single bay. The building contains a stable door with a segmental head flanked by oval openings, above which is a loft opening. In the west gable are pigeon holes.
Windmill at Mill Farm; 53.17645°N 0.75475°W		c. 1746	The lower section of a former post mill, it is in brick and stone, and consists of a two-stage circular tower. On the walls are brick buttresses carrying stone blocks. The building contains doorways and shuttered openings, all with segmental heads.
Chase House and wall 53.17579°N 0.76461°W	—	18th century	The house is in brick with stone dressings, modillion eaves, and a pantile roof with saddleback coped gables. There are two storeys and attics, three bays, and a single-storey range to the west. The central doorway has reeded pilasters, a semicircular fanlight and an open pediment. Above it is a round-headed sash window with fan tracery, impost blocks and a keystone. The outer bays contain tripartite sash windows with rubbed brick heads and keystones. The boundary wall is in brick with saddleback coping, and contains brick piers and a wooden gate.
Stable block, Chase House; 53.17593°N 0.76506°W	—	18th century	The stable block is in brick, and has a pantile roof with coped gables. There are two storeys and three bays. In the south front is a blind three-bay arcade containing a stable door with a rectangular fanlight, vents with segmental heads, and oval blocked openings, and above are three glazed vents. In the east front is a carriage entrance with an unglazed fanlight.
The Cottage; 53.17611°N 0.76535°W	—	18th century	A house in brick with dentilled eaves, and a pantile roof with coped gables and kneelers. There are two storeys and two bays, and a lean-to on the south. On the front is a porch, and the windows are horizontally-sliding sashes, those in the ground floor with segmental heads.
Plum Tree Farmhouse; 53.17550°N 0.76622°W		c. 1800	The farmhouse is in brick with floor bands and a hipped tile roof. There are three storeys and four bays, and a service wing to the east with two storeys, two bays and a pantile roof. The doorway in the second bay has a rectangular fanlight and a hood on brackets. The windows in the lower two floors are sashes, in the top floor they are casements, and all have segmental heads.
Chapel Cottage; 53.17326°N 0.76575°W		Early 19th century	The house is in brick with dentilled eaves and a pantile roof. There are two storeys and three bays. Most of the windows are horizontally-sliding sashes. The doorway and the ground floor windows have segmental heads.
Methodist Church and railings 53.17322°N 0.76587°W		1832	The church is in brick with dentilled eaves and a hipped pantile roof. There is a single storey, three bays, and a rounded corner. In the centre is a doorway flanked by sash windows with segmental heads, and above it is a datestone. In front of the forecourt are iron railings and a gate.
Holy Trinity Church and wall 53.17339°N 0.76620°W		1844	An apse was added to the church in 1897. It is built in red brick with stone dressings, quoins, and a roof of stone slab and Welsh slate with coped gables. The church consists of a nave with an apse, a south porch, and a bell turret on the west gable. The porch has a gable with a finial, it contains a four-centred arched doorway with a hood mould, and the windows are double lancets with Y-tracery. The bell turret has a lancet window on each side, modillion eaves, and a pyramidal roof with a cross. The boundary wall is in brick with cast iron coping, ornate railings and a gate.
