= John Woolley (cricketer) =

English cricketer

Personal information
- Full name: John Turton Woolley
- Born: 27 September 1822; South Collingham, Nottinghamshire, England
- Died: 24 June 1894 (aged 71); Harrow on the Hill, Middlesex, England
- Batting: Unknown
- Bowling: Unknown

Career statistics
Competition	First-class
Matches	1
Runs scored	3
Batting average	3.00
100s/50s	–/–
Top score	3
Balls bowled	16
Wickets	0
Bowling average	–
5 wickets in innings	–
10 wickets in match	–
Best bowling	–
Catches/stumpings	–/–
- Source: Cricinfo, 12 September 2019

John Turton Woolley (27 September 1822 – 24 June 1894) was an English first-class cricketer.

The son of Thomas Smith Woolley, he was born in September 1822 at South Collingham, Nottinghamshire. After being home schooled, he attended Magdalene College, Cambridge. Although he did not play first-class cricket for Cambridge University, he did play a single first-class match while studying at Cambridge, when he appeared for the North against the Marylebone Cricket Club in 1845 at Nottingham. Batting twice in the match, he was dismissed without scoring by Jemmy Dean in the North's first-innings, while in their second-innings he was dismissed for 3 runs by William Hillyer. Graduating from Cambridge in 1846, he became a student of the Lincoln's Inn, before migrating to the Inner Temple, where he was called to the bar in May 1849. He married Mary Flora Kerr in December 1850. Woolley died at Harrow on the Hill in June 1894.
