= Holme, Nottinghamshire =

Hamlet and civil parish in Nottinghamshire, England

Coordinates: 53.12°N 0.80°W

Holme
- Hamlet and civil parish
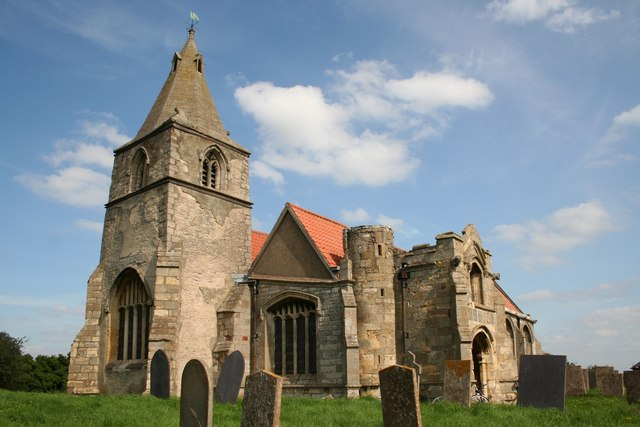
- St Giles' Church, Holme

- Location within Nottinghamshire
- Interactive map of Holme
- Area: 1.76 sq mi (4.6 km^{2})
- Population: 80 (2021)
  - Density: 45/sq mi (17/km^{2})
- OS grid reference: SK 801590
  - London: 115 mi (185 km) SSE
- District: Newark and Sherwood
- Shire county: Nottinghamshire
- Region: East Midlands
- Country: England
- Sovereign state: United Kingdom
- Post town: NEWARK
- Postcode district: NG23
- Dialling code: 01636
- Police: Nottinghamshire
- Fire: Nottinghamshire
- Ambulance: East Midlands
- UK Parliament: Newark

Holme is a hamlet and civil parish in Nottinghamshire, England. The population of the civil parish (including Langford) at the 2011 census was 165, Holme alone registered 80 residents at the 2021 census. It is within the district of Newark and Sherwood, on the east of the River Trent, less than half a mile from the riverside and 4 miles north of Newark-on-Trent.

The parish church of St Giles is an Early Tudor rebuild of a 13th-century church. The Lancashire wool merchant John Barton was responsible for the rebuilding. He died in 1491, and is buried in the chancel with his wife. In a window of his house at Holme is inscribed the verse:

I thanke God, and ever shall,
It is the sheep have paid for all.

Holme was historically a chapelry in the ancient parish of North Muskham. Until about 1575 it lay on the west side of the River Trent, but there was then a cataclysmic flood which changed the course of the river. Holme was therefore separated by the river from the rest of the parish. In 1866 Holme became a separate civil parish.

The last known catch of a sturgeon on the Trent occurred in 1902 near the village, the fish was eight and a half feet long and weighed 250 pounds.

== See also ==
- Listed buildings in Holme, Nottinghamshire
