= Collingham, Nottinghamshire =

Village and civil parish in England

Coordinates: 53°08′52″N 0°45′33″W

Collingham
- Village and civil parish
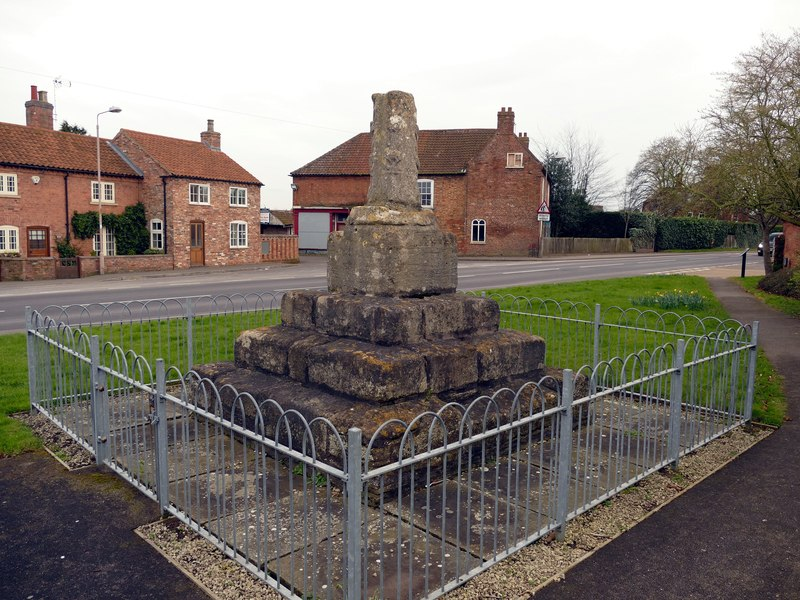
- Collingham Cross

- Location within Nottinghamshire
- Interactive map of Collingham
- Area: 8.64 sq mi (22.4 km^{2})
- Population: 3,052 (2021)
  - Density: 353/sq mi (136/km^{2})
- OS grid reference: SK 835615
  - London: 115 mi (185 km) SSE
- Civil parish: Collingham
- District: Newark and Sherwood
- Shire county: Nottinghamshire
- Region: East Midlands
- Country: England
- Sovereign state: United Kingdom
- Settlements: North Collingham; South Collingham; Brough; Danethorpe; Danethorpe Hill
- Post town: NEWARK
- Postcode district: NG23
- Dialling code: 01636
- Police: Nottinghamshire
- Fire: Nottinghamshire
- Ambulance: East Midlands
- UK Parliament: Newark
- Website: collingham-pc.gov.uk

Collingham is a village and civil parish in the Newark and Sherwood district, in the county of Nottinghamshire, England. The population of the parish at the 2011 census was 2,738, increasing to 3,052 at the 2021 census.

Collingham is on the River Trent and the A1133 main road, just off the A46, 6 miles (9.7 km) from Newark-on-Trent, 15 miles (24.1 km) from Lincoln, and 28 miles (45.1 km) from Nottingham.

The civil parish of Collingham comprises the villages of Brough, Danethorpe and Danethorpe Hill and Collingham itself, which is made up of North Collingham and South Collingham; each with a medieval church.

== History ==
Collingham is close to the old Roman fort at Brough and there have been several local finds of Roman coins, jewellery and villa remains. It lies close to the Fosse Way on its way to Lincoln. The village name suggests a fairly early Saxon foundation, preceding the occupation of eastern England by the Danes and it is naturally mentioned in the Domesday Book. It is thought that the Great North Road crossed the Trent here before Newark was founded; prior to the river's change of channel westwards it ran close to the village and was the cause of much flooding. Many of the other villages close by have names which suggest that they were later daughter settlements. It possessed two churches in North and South Collingham from before the Norman conquest. The parishes extended from the river floodplain onto the uncultivated moorland on the higher ground between Trent and Witham, allowing for good grazing and meadowland throughout the year.

In medieval and early modern times Collingham operated an openfield system and enclosure did not take place until the turn of the 18th/19th centuries, changing much local farming from a small holding of strips and the right to extensive grazing, to individual small cottage holdings or a precarious existence as a landless agricultural labourer. The wide square fields and relatively few isolated farms are the result. One field was set aside in the enclosure award of 1790 for lease every year with the revenues being put to the use of the poor of the parish. Around the end of the 18th and beginning of the 19th century there was an influx of agricultural labour, displaced from the enclosures of the upland Lincolnshire villages in places like Boothby Graffoe, Coleby and Harmston, taking the place of former Collingham people who had moved to towns such as Lincoln, Newark and Nottingham in search of better employment.

During the siege of Newark in the English Civil War, the countryside was subject to deprivation from the opposing armies wanting food and fresh horses and the village suffered. In 1664, a mercer of Collingham, one Thomas Ridge, issued his own copper halfpenny tokens, in response to currency shortage after the civil war.

In the 19th century Collingham was fairly self-sufficient with its own watchmaker, shoemakers, blacksmiths, dressmakers, schools, grocers and carriers. There were many local societies and the Nonconformist churches had their own congregations. At one point there was considerable enmity between the vicar of North Collingham and the rector of South Collingham with many disputes about the schools in the village. There are a large number of listed buildings in the village , from the c16 through to the c19, and the village is highly valued as a place to live and commute from.

== Facilities ==
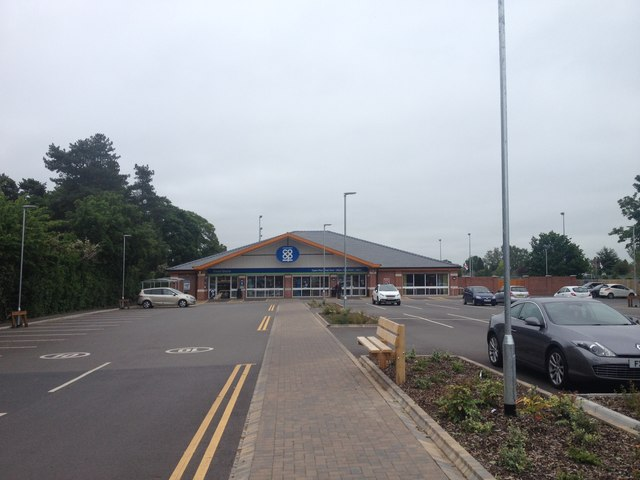
The Co-op.

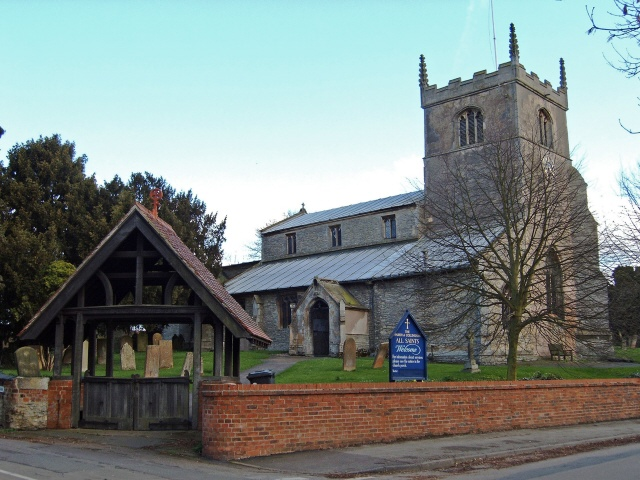
Church of All Saints, North Collingham

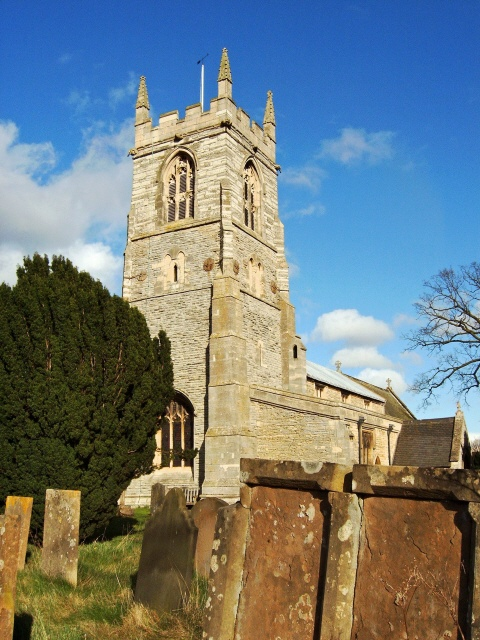
Church of St. John the Baptist, South Collingham

Local amenities include the Co-op and One-Stop convenience stores, butcher's, general store, newsagent and post office. There is a medical centre/dentist/pharmacy complex which serves much of the surrounding area, plus a library in the same building. Now collectively known as Collingham Village Centre, negotiations are currently under way between Collingham Parish Council, Lincolnshire Co-operative, Collingham Football Club, and other interested parties, to build a new, much larger, Co-op supermarket, and a greatly enlarged car park. This will add another two to four retail outlets in the Village Centre, and is supported by the majority of the villagers who voted in a Parish Council survey.

There are some sporting facilities in Collingham, notably Collingham F.C. and Collingham Cricket Club. There are also facilities for tennis, bowling and croquet while the nearby River Trent seems very popular with anglers.

Collingham is fairly easy to get to by road or railway, being very close to the A46 and 5.5 miles from the A1/A46 junction at Newark-on-Trent. Collingham is served by the Nottingham-Lincoln railway line used by East Midlands Trains, which passes close to the east side of the village, where there is the station, and you can reach most parts of the Midlands. There is an East Coast station at Newark Northgate from which London can be reached as well as all locations on the East Coast Main Line. A bus service to Newark operates on an irregular basis, with two daily buses running to Lincoln on a daily basis.

== Bypass ==
One ongoing issue affecting the village regards a bypass. The issue is not new, and has surfaced a number of times over the past sixty years or so, the last time being rejected in favour of another project in the county, a new bus station in Mansfield. The proposed bypass is not seen as a priority and in addition would damage the countryside and natural environment along the east side of the village.Many villagers pose the argument that the damage to the environment would be more than offset by the reduction in damage to the built environment along the High Street, and the cessation of the use of Low Street as a 'rat run' to avoid the traffic lights at the Station Road junction. Pressure groups within the village continue to campaign for the bypass to be built, regardless of how remote the possibility.

== Notable people ==
Johannes White de Colyngham appointed commissioners by the King Henry VI in 1433 "to summon all persons of quality before them, and to tender to them an oath for the better keeping of the peace, and observing the king's laws, both in themselves, and in their retainers or dependants."

The composer John Blow was born in the village. Two brothers from the village, John and William Bacon, took part in the Charge of the Light Brigade (under the assumed name of Baker). William was killed, but John returned, later leaving the Army. Both are buried in North Collingham churchyard.

Cricketer John Woolley (1822-1894) was born in South Collingham.

Drummer William Bowerman, formerly of I Was a Cub Scout and Brontide is from Collingham.

== See also ==
- Listed buildings in Collingham, Nottinghamshire
