= Wigsley =

Village and civil parish in Nottinghamshire, England

Coordinates: 53.22°N 0.71°W

- Village and civil parish
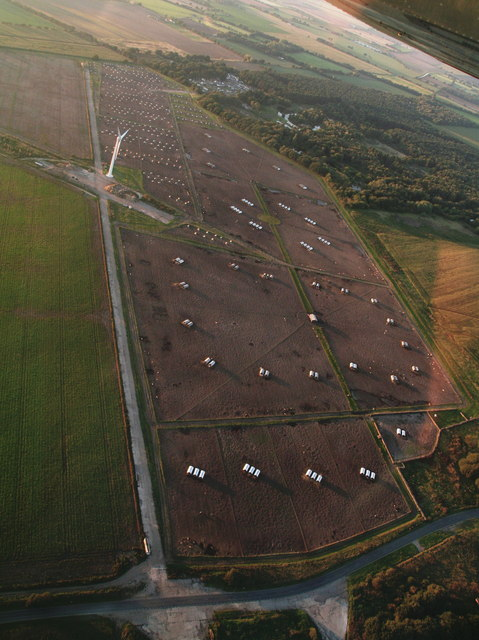
- Former Wigsley airfield, and wind turbine, aerial 2015

- Location within Nottinghamshire
- Interactive map of Wigsley
- Area: 1.92 sq mi (5.0 km^{2})
- Population: 118 (2021)
  - Density: 61/sq mi (24/km^{2})
- OS grid reference: SK 860701
  - London: 120 mi (190 km) SSE
- District: Newark and Sherwood
- Shire county: Nottinghamshire
- Region: East Midlands
- Country: England
- Sovereign state: United Kingdom
- Post town: NEWARK
- Postcode district: NG23
- Dialling code: 01522
- Police: Nottinghamshire
- Fire: Nottinghamshire
- Ambulance: East Midlands
- UK Parliament: Newark
- Website: www.hugofox.com/community/wigsley-village-13420

Wigsley is a village and civil parish in Nottinghamshire, England. The population of the civil parish taken at the 2011 census was 178 (including Spalford), Wigsley alone reported 118 residents in the 2021 census. It is located 10 miles west of Lincoln. To the south-west of the village are the remains of R.A.F. Wigsley airfield. Wigsley is one of the Thankful Villages – those rare places that were spared fatalities in the Great War of 1914 to 1918. The village was featured on Darren Hayman's album, Thankful Villages Volume 2.
