= Girton, Nottinghamshire =

Village and civil parish in Nottinghamshire, England

Coordinates: 53.19°N 0.77°W

Girton
- Village and civil parish
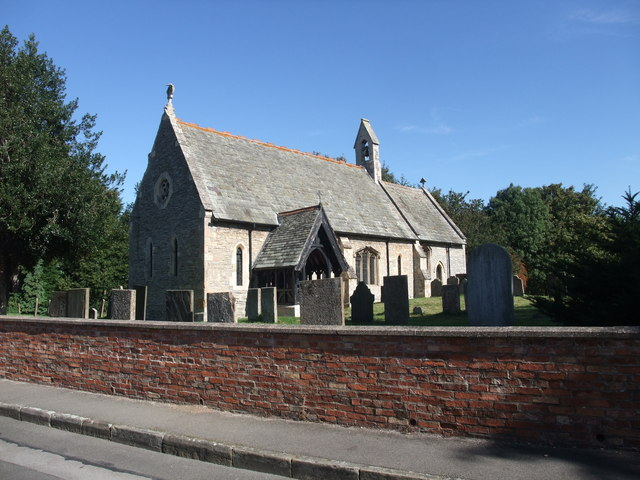
- Church of St Cecilia, Girton

- Location within Nottinghamshire
- Interactive map of Girton
- Area: 1.67 sq mi (4.3 km^{2})
- Population: 138 (2021)
  - Density: 83/sq mi (32/km^{2})
- OS grid reference: SK 825661
  - London: 120 mi (190 km) SSE
- District: Newark and Sherwood
- Shire county: Nottinghamshire
- Region: East Midlands
- Country: England
- Sovereign state: United Kingdom
- Post town: NEWARK
- Postcode district: NG23
- Dialling code: 01522
- Police: Nottinghamshire
- Fire: Nottinghamshire
- Ambulance: East Midlands
- UK Parliament: Newark

Girton is a village and civil parish in Nottinghamshire, England. According to the 2001 census it had a population of 143, reducing slightly to 140 at the 2011 census, and 138 at the 2021 census. It is located 17 miles west of Lincoln.

The parish church of St Cecilia is a small aisleless church almost totally rebuilt in 1879. Fleet Cottage is a rare example of an early north-east Nottinghamshire cottage of the 17th century, with a timber-framed upper storey on a limestone ground floor. Girton has many floodplains from the River Trent that support many species of plants and wildlife such as Meadow Foxtail and Meadowsweet.

A reference to Girton appears in John Marius Wilson's Imperial Gazetteer of England and Wales (1870-72), in which the village was said to have 46 houses and a property value of £2,056.

== See also ==
- Listed buildings in Girton, Nottinghamshire
