= South Scarle =

Village and civil parish in Nottinghamshire, England

Coordinates: 53.17°N 0.73°W

- Village and civil parish
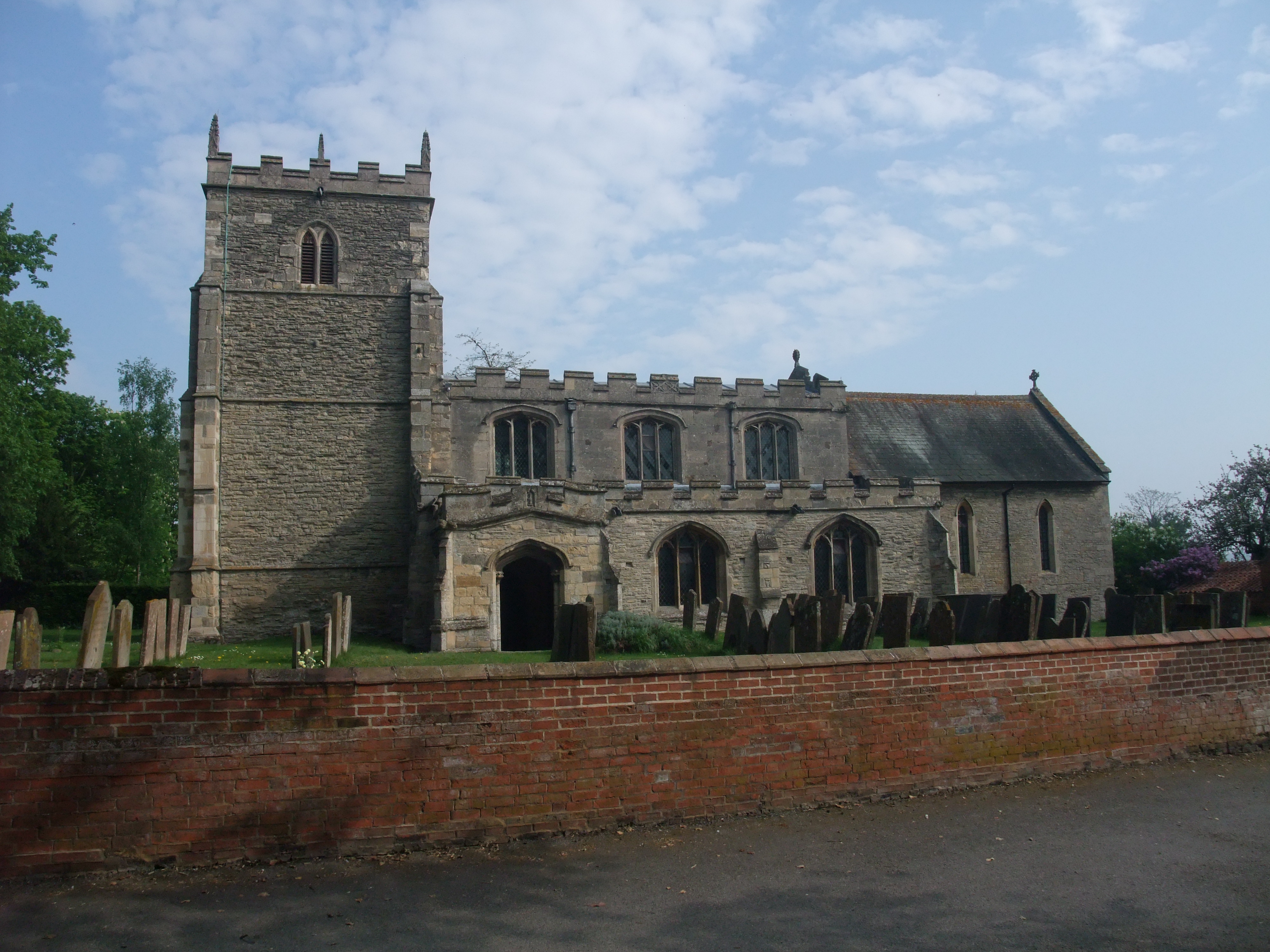
- Church of St Helena, South Scarle

- Location within Nottinghamshire
- Interactive map of South Scarle
- Area: 1.7 sq mi (4.4 km^{2})
- Population: 179 (2021)
  - Density: 105/sq mi (41/km^{2})
- OS grid reference: SK 847639
  - London: 115 mi (185 km) SSE
- District: Newark and Sherwood
- Shire county: Nottinghamshire
- Region: East Midlands
- Country: England
- Sovereign state: United Kingdom
- Post town: NEWARK
- Postcode district: NG23
- Dialling code: 01636
- Police: Nottinghamshire
- Fire: Nottinghamshire
- Ambulance: East Midlands
- UK Parliament: Newark
- Website: southscarlecommunitycentre.com

South Scarle is a village and civil parish in the Newark and Sherwood district of Nottinghamshire, England. It has a community centre, a post office and a church. At the 2011 census it reported 194 residents, this fell to 179 at the 2021 census.

== See also ==
- Listed buildings in South Scarle
