= Grade I listed buildings in Nottinghamshire =

Nottinghamshire shown within England

There are over 9,000 Grade I listed buildings in England. This page is a list of these buildings in the county of Nottinghamshire, by district.

== Ashfield ==
Name	Location	Type	Completed (Note: The date given is the date used by Historic England as significant for the initial building or that of an important part in the structure's description.)	Date designated	Grid ref. (Note: The grid reference is based on the British national grid reference system, sometimes known as OSGB36, used by the Ordnance Survey.) Geo-coordinates	Entry number (Note: The "List Entry Number" is a unique number assigned to each listed building and scheduled monument by Historic England.)	Image
Ruins of Church of All Saints	Annesley Park, Annesley	Parish Church	12th century	13 October 1966	SK5034952363; 53°03′58″N 1°15′00″W	1234999	Ruins of Church of All Saints More images
Church of St Katharine	Teversal	Tower	13th century	12 October 1988	SK4833961902; 53°09′07″N 1°16′43″W	1234886	Church of St Katharine More images

== Bassetlaw ==
Name	Location	Type	Completed	Date designated	Grid ref. Geo-coordinates	Entry number	Image
Church of All Saints	Babworth, Bassetlaw	Parish Church	15th century	27 November 1984	SK6863380851; 53°19′13″N 0°58′16″W	1370370	Church of All Saints More images
Blyth New Bridge	Blyth	Bridge	c. 1770	4 January 1952	SK6173287204; 53°22′41″N 1°04′25″W	1238969	Blyth New Bridge More images
St. Mary and St. Martin’s Church, Blyth	Blyth	Church	Late 11th century	30 November 1966	SK6240387292; 53°22′44″N 1°03′48″W	1239182	St. Mary and St. Martin’s Church, Blyth More images
Serlby Hall	Blyth	House	1812	4 January 1952	SK6345589342; 53°23′50″N 1°02′50″W	1045126	Serlby Hall More images
St John the Evangelist's Church, Carlton in Lindrick	South Carlton, Carlton in Lindrick	Church	14th century	30 November 1966	SK5882683902; 53°20′55″N 1°07′04″W	1045742	St John the Evangelist's Church, Carlton in Lindrick More images
Church of St John the Baptist	Clarborough, Clarborough and Welham	Parish Church	13th century	1 February 1967	SK7346283279; 53°20′29″N 0°53′53″W	1370125	Church of St John the Baptist More images
St. Peter's Church, Clayworth	Clayworth	Parish Church	12th century	1 February 1967	SK7263488428; 53°23′16″N 0°54′34″W	1212157	St. Peter's Church, Clayworth More images
Church of St Mary the Virgin, Clumber Park	Clumber Park, Clumber and Hardwick, Bassetlaw	Chapel	1886-1889	13 February 1967	SK6267274606; 53°15′53″N 1°03′43″W	1045032	Church of St Mary the Virgin, Clumber Park More images
St Mary's Church, Norton Cuckney	Cuckney	Church	12th century	30 November 1966	SK5663271391; 53°14′12″N 1°09′11″W	1206551	St Mary's Church, Norton Cuckney More images
St Oswald's Church, Dunham-on-Trent	Dunham-on-Trent	Parish Church	15th century	1 February 1967	SK8150874487; 53°15′40″N 0°46′46″W	1370101	St Oswald's Church, Dunham-on-Trent More images
Church of St Peter and St Paul, East Drayton	East Drayton, Bassetlaw	Parish Church	Late 12th century	1 February 1967	SK7755975330; 53°16′09″N 0°50′19″W	1212946	Church of St Peter and St Paul, East Drayton More images
Church of St John the Baptist, East Markham	East Markham	Church	14th century	1 February 1967	SK7432072661; 53°14′45″N 0°53′16″W	1223679	Church of St John the Baptist, East Markham More images
Apleyhead Lodge, Clumber Park	Clumber Park, Elkesley	Gate	c. 1770	1 February 1967	SK6449877322; 53°17′20″N 1°02′02″W	1267083	Apleyhead Lodge, Clumber Park More images
St Giles' Church, Elkesley	Elkesley	Parish Church	c. 1300	1 February 1967	SK6892375514; 53°16′20″N 0°58′05″W	1223919	St Giles' Church, Elkesley More images
St Gregory's Church, Fledborough	Fledborough	Sundial	12th century	1 February 1967	SK8120772196; 53°14′26″N 0°47′05″W	1045689	St Gregory's Church, Fledborough More images
Church of St Peter	Gamston	Parish Church	13th century	1 February 1967	SK7087476022; 53°16′35″N 0°56′19″W	1224125	Church of St Peter More images
Church of St Peter	Hayton	Parish Church	12th century	1 February 1967	SK7271984183; 53°20′58″N 0°54′33″W	1034425	Church of St Peter More images
St. Peter's Church, Headon-cum-Upton	Headon, Headon cum Upton	Parish Church	13th century	1 February 1967	SK7485477066; 53°17′07″N 0°52′43″W	1224198	St. Peter's Church, Headon-cum-Upton More images
Hodsock Priory Gatehouse and Bridge	Hodsock	Gatehouse	16th century	4 January 1952	SK6114085462; 53°21′45″N 1°04′58″W	1187689	Hodsock Priory Gatehouse and Bridge More images
St Peter's Church, Laneham	Church Laneham, Laneham	Parish Church	12th century	1 February 1967	SK8148276570; 53°16′47″N 0°46′46″W	1233511	St Peter's Church, Laneham More images
St Wilfrid's Church, Low Marnham	Low Marnham, Marnham	Parish Church	13th century	1 February 1967	SK8068069391; 53°12′56″N 0°47′36″W	1276534	St Wilfrid's Church, Low Marnham More images
All Saints' Church, Mattersey	Mattersey	Parish Church	13th century	1 February 1967	SK6906589383; 53°23′48″N 0°57′46″W	1239190	All Saints' Church, Mattersey More images
Church of St John the Baptist and Boundary Wall	Misson	Church	19th century	1 February 1967	SK6910694931; 53°26′48″N 0°57′40″W	1045108	Church of St John the Baptist and Boundary Wall More images
All Saints' Church, Misterton	Misterton	Parish Church	c. 1200	1 February 1967	SK7647194774; 53°26′39″N 0°51′01″W	1302717	All Saints' Church, Misterton More images
St Martin's Church, North Leverton	North Leverton with Habblesthorpe	Parish Church	12th century	1 February 1967	SK7871282261; 53°19′53″N 0°49′10″W	1234265	St Martin's Church, North Leverton More images
Church of All Saints	Rampton, Rampton and Woodbeck	Parish Church	10th century	1 February 1967	SK7995078580; 53°17′53″N 0°48′07″W	1233879	Church of All Saints More images
Gateway from Manor Farm to Churchyard and Attached Walls 7 Metres West of Manor Farmhouse	Rampton, Rampton and Woodbeck	Gate	Mid 16th century	28 February 1952	SK7997278590; 53°17′54″N 0°48′06″W	1276407	Gateway from Manor Farm to Churchyard and Attached Walls 7 Metres West of Manor Farmhouse More images
St Martin of Tours' Church, Saundby	Saundby	Parish Church	13th century	1 February 1967	SK7854587982; 53°22′58″N 0°49′14″W	1045083	St Martin of Tours' Church, Saundby More images
Remains of Church of St Helen	South Wheatley, North and South Wheatley	Parish Church	12th century	1 February 1967	SK7664185529; 53°21′40″N 0°50′59″W	1216694	Remains of Church of St Helen More images
Church of St Nicholas, Littleborough	Littleborough, Sturton Le Steeple	Parish Church	11th century	1 February 1967	SK8245482619; 53°20′03″N 0°45′48″W	1216860	Church of St Nicholas, Littleborough More images
Church of St Bartholomew	Sutton	Parish Church	12th century	1 February 1967	SK6808984975; 53°21′26″N 0°58′42″W	1239776	Church of St Bartholomew More images
Church of St John the Baptist	Treswell	Parish Church	13th century	1 February 1967	SK7815879396; 53°18′21″N 0°49′43″W	1234072	Church of St John the Baptist More images
St Nicholas' Church, Tuxford	Tuxford	Parish Church	12th century	1 February 1967	SK7366771064; 53°13′53″N 0°53′52″W	1224269	St Nicholas' Church, Tuxford More images
St Mary Magdalene's Church, Walkeringham	Walkeringham	Parish Church	13th century	1 February 1967	SK7706792227; 53°25′16″N 0°50′30″W	1045085	St Mary Magdalene's Church, Walkeringham More images
Welbeck Abbey College Offices	Welbeck Abbey, Welbeck	Offices	1985	8 February 1972	SK5632574329; 53°15′47″N 1°09′25″W	1224773	Welbeck Abbey College Offices
Welbeck Abbey and Attached Picture Gallery, Chapel and Library	Welbeck Abbey, Welbeck	Country House	Early 17th century	8 February 1972	SK5635874302; 53°15′46″N 1°09′24″W	1224867	Welbeck Abbey and Attached Picture Gallery, Chapel and Library More images
All Saints' Church, West Markham (Milton Mausoleum)	Milton, West Markham	Parish Church	1832	1 February 1967	SK7151272999; 53°14′57″N 0°55′47″W	1224544	All Saints' Church, West Markham (Milton Mausoleum) More images
All Saints' Church, West Markham	Markham Clinton, West Markham	Parish Church	Late 12th century	1 February 1967	SK7214372684; 53°14′47″N 0°55′13″W	1224486	All Saints' Church, West Markham More images
Church of St Cuthbert and St Mary, Worksop Priory, and Remains of Cloister Wall	Worksop	Church	Various	13 February 1967	SK5902778906; 53°18′14″N 1°06′57″W	1156758	Church of St Cuthbert and St Mary, Worksop Priory, and Remains of Cloister Wall More images
Manor Lodge	Worksop	Country House	c. 1590	13 February 1967	SK5649179196; 53°18′24″N 1°09′13″W	1045041	Manor Lodge More images
Worksop Manor, House and Stable Block	Worksop	Country House	1701-1704	13 February 1967	SK5699078018; 53°17′46″N 1°08′47″W	1370406	Worksop Manor, House and Stable Block More images
Worksop Priory Gatehouse	Worksop	Museum	Mid 14th century	27 September 1951	SK5899078805; 53°18′11″N 1°06′59″W	1045028	Worksop Priory Gatehouse More images

== Broxtowe ==
Name	Location	Type	Completed	Date designated	Grid ref. Geo-coordinates	Entry number	Image
Stapleford Cross	Stapleford	Cross	11th century	14 April 1987	SK4890337350; 52°55′53″N 1°16′26″W	1278059	Stapleford Cross More images
Church of All Saints	Strelley	Parish Church	13th century	13 October 1966	SK5065042090; 52°58′26″N 1°14′50″W	1248224	Church of All Saints More images
St. Mary's Church, Attenborough	Attenborough	Parish Church	12th century	14 April 1987	SK5187034331; 52°54′14″N 1°13′49″W	1263869	St. Mary's Church, Attenborough More images
Building D6 at Boots Factory Site	Beeston	Industrial Building	Mid 20th Century	14 April 1987	SK5430236774; 52°55′32″N 1°11′37″W	1278028	Building D6 at Boots Factory Site More images
D10 Building at Boots Factory Site, That Part in Nottingham Civil Parish	Beeston	Pharmaceutical Works	1932	28 January 1971	SK5445436630; 52°55′28″N 1°11′29″W	1247927	D10 Building at Boots Factory Site, That Part in Nottingham Civil Parish More images

== City of Nottingham ==
Name	Location	Type	Completed	Date designated	Grid ref. Geo-coordinates	Entry number	Image
Building D10 at Boots Factory Site	City of Nottingham (mainly in Beeston)	Pharmaceutical Works	1932	28 January 1971	52°55′27″N 1°11′32″W	1247927	Building D10 at Boots Factory Site More images
Castle Museum and Art Gallery	City of Nottingham	Art Gallery	1876-78	11 August 1952	SK5691439447; 52°56′58″N 1°09′16″W	1271188	Castle Museum and Art Gallery More images
Church of St Mary	Lace Market, City of Nottingham	Parish Church	Late 14th century	11 August 1952	SK5767339654; 52°57′04″N 1°08′35″W	1342118	Church of St Mary More images
Church of St Mary the Virgin	Clifton, City of Nottingham	Church	Late 14th century	14 April 1954	SK5411134805; 52°54′29″N 1°11′49″W	1270726	Church of St Mary the Virgin More images
Church of St Peter with St James	City of Nottingham	Church	15th century	11 August 1952	SK5730539769; 52°57′08″N 1°08′55″W	1255013	Church of St Peter with St James More images
Clifton Hall	Clifton, City of Nottingham	Country House	Late 16th century	14 April 1954	SK5403434842; 52°54′30″N 1°11′53″W	1247639	Clifton Hall More images
Building D6 at Boots Factory Site	City of Nottingham	Pharmaceutical Works	1938	4 April 1991	SK5435736804; 52°55′33″N 1°11′34″W	1247645	Building D6 at Boots Factory Site More images
Nottingham Castle Gatehouse, Outer Bridge and Adjoining Gateway	City of Nottingham	Castle	1252-55	11 August 1952	SK5694939583; 52°57′02″N 1°09′14″W	1247094	Nottingham Castle Gatehouse, Outer Bridge and Adjoining Gateway More images
Nottingham Castle Outer Bailey Wall and Towers	City of Nottingham	Tower	c. 1280	12 July 1972	SK5704139462; 52°56′58″N 1°09′09″W	1246765	Nottingham Castle Outer Bailey Wall and Towers More images
Statue of Captain Albert Ball	City of Nottingham	Statue	1921	12 July 1972	SK5695139510; 52°57′00″N 1°09′14″W	1246929	Statue of Captain Albert Ball More images
Wollaton Hall	Wollaton Park	Country House	1580-88	11 August 1952	SK5320239242; 52°56′53″N 1°12′35″W	1255269	Wollaton Hall More images

== Gedling ==
Name	Location	Type	Completed	Date designated	Grid ref. Geo-coordinates	Entry number	Image
St Helen's Church, Burton Joyce	Burton Joyce	Tower	13th century	13 October 1966	SK6478043694; 52°59′12″N 1°02′11″W	1227460	St Helen's Church, Burton Joyce More images
Holy Trinity Church, Lambley	Lambley	Tower	13th century	13 October 1966	SK6312045435; 53°00′09″N 1°03′39″W	1264623	Holy Trinity Church, Lambley More images
Newstead Abbey and Adjoining Boundary Wall	Newstead Park, Newstead	Kitchen	1819	14 May 1952	SK5416253770; 53°04′42″N 1°11′35″W	1265325	Newstead Abbey and Adjoining Boundary Wall More images
Church of St James, Papplewick	Papplewick Hall, Papplewick	Parish Church	14th century	13 October 1966	SK5456951526; 53°03′30″N 1°11′14″W	1264291	Church of St James, Papplewick More images
Papplewick Hall	Papplewick	Country House	c. 1785	14 May 1952	SK5482851721; 53°03′36″N 1°11′00″W	1265296	Papplewick Hall More images
All Hallows Church, Gedling	Gedling	Cross	13th century	18 January 1950	SK6183842570; 52°58′37″N 1°04′50″W	1235924	All Hallows Church, Gedling More images

== Mansfield ==
Name	Location	Type	Completed	Date designated	Grid ref. Geo-coordinates	Entry number	Image
Church of St Augustine	Sookholme, Warsop	Parish Church	Early 12th century	29 July 1966	SK5483466906; 53°11′47″N 1°10′50″W	1262532	Church of St Augustine More images
Church of St Peter and St Paul	Church Warsop, Warsop	Church	11th century	29 July 1966	SK5678568801; 53°12′48″N 1°09′04″W	1240271	Church of St Peter and St Paul More images
Church of St Peter and St Paul	Mansfield	Church	c. 1300	19 December 1955	SK5407861008; 53°08′37″N 1°11′35″W	1214166	Church of St Peter and St Paul More images

== Newark and Sherwood ==
Name	Location	Type	Completed	Date designated	Grid ref. Geo-coordinates	Entry number	Image
Church of St Michael	Averham	Parish Church	11th century	11 August 1961	SK7681254367; 53°04′52″N 0°51′17″W	1046008	Church of St Michael More images
Church of St Giles	Balderton	Parish Church	12th century	16 January 1967	SK8200151578; 53°03′19″N 0°46′41″W	1369963	Church of St Giles More images
Church of All Saints	Barnby in the Willows	Parish Church	13th century	16 January 1967	SK8603352189; 53°03′36″N 0°43′04″W	1302715	Church of All Saints More images
Church of St Margaret	Bilsthorpe	Church	13th century	28 April 1986	SK6545460255; 53°08′08″N 1°01′23″W	1045616	Church of St Margaret More images
Church of St Andrew	Caunton	Parish Church	C12-15	11 August 1961	SK7456660029; 53°07′56″N 0°53′13″W	1045974	Church of St Andrew More images
Church of All Saints	Collingham	Parish Church	12th century	16 January 1967	SK8297462044; 53°08′57″N 0°45′39″W	1156985	Church of All Saints More images
Church of St John the Baptist	Collingham	Parish Church	12th century	16 January 1967	SK8266561311; 53°08′33″N 0°45′56″W	1046050	Church of St John the Baptist More images
Church of St Giles	Cromwell	Parish Church	13th century	11 August 1961	SK7993561536; 53°08′42″N 0°48′23″W	1369982	Church of St Giles More images
Church of St Mary	Edwinstowe	Parish Church	12th century	11 August 1961	SK6252066939; 53°11′45″N 1°03′56″W	1045467	Church of St Mary More images
Church of St Mary	Egmanton	Parish Church	11th century	11 August 1961	SK7359968914; 53°12′44″N 0°53′58″W	1156553	Church of St Mary More images
Elston Chapel	Elston	Parish Church	12th century	25 February 1952	SK7617148227; 53°01′33″N 0°51′57″W	1157196	Elston Chapel More images
Church of the Holy Cross	Epperstone	Parish Church	13th century	11 August 1961	SK6507648527; 53°01′48″N 1°01′52″W	1045543	Church of the Holy Cross More images
Church of St Peter	Farndon	Parish Church	12th century	16 January 1967	SK7679051794; 53°03′28″N 0°51′21″W	1178470	Church of St Peter More images
Church of St Michael the Archangel and Attached Wall and Railings	Halam	Church	12th century	11 August 1961	SK6781354364; 53°04′56″N 0°59′21″W	1045520	Church of St Michael the Archangel and Attached Wall and Railings More images
Church of All Saints	Hawton	Parish Church	13th century	16 January 1967	SK7883251138; 53°03′06″N 0°49′31″W	1046031	Church of All Saints More images
Church of St Giles	Holme	Parish Church	12th century	16 January 1967	SK8028159107; 53°07′23″N 0°48′06″W	1302380	Church of St Giles More images
Church of St Wilfrid	Kelham	Parish Church	14th century	11 August 1961	SK7737755391; 53°05′24″N 0°50′46″W	1302213	Church of St Wilfrid More images
Kelham Hall	Kelham	Kitchen	1859-61	13 June 1973	SK7737255551; 53°05′30″N 0°50′46″W	1045982	Kelham Hall More images
Church of St Bartholomew	Kneesall	Church	11th century	11 August 1961	SK7041764198; 53°10′13″N 0°56′53″W	1156936	Church of St Bartholomew More images
Church of St Bartholomew	Langford	Parish Church	13th century	16 January 1967	SK8211459079; 53°07′21″N 0°46′28″W	1302343	Church of St Bartholomew More images
Church of St Michael	Laxton, Laxton and Moorhouse	Church	1820	11 August 1961	SK7220067068; 53°11′45″N 0°55′15″W	1370158	Church of St Michael More images
Church of St Mary	Lowdham	Parish Church	13th century	11 August 1961	SK6627846827; 53°00′53″N 1°00′49″W	1285738	Church of St Mary More images
Church of St Radegund	Maplebeck	Parish Church	13th century	11 August 1961	SK7108960764; 53°08′21″N 0°56′20″W	1045596	Church of St Radegund More images
Church of St Mary Magdalene and Attached Railing	Newark-on-Trent	Tower	c. 1220	29 September 1950	SK7994553928; 53°04′36″N 0°48′29″W	1279450	Church of St Mary Magdalene and Attached Railing More images
Governor's House	Newark-on-Trent	House	Late 18th century	29 September 1950	SK7981053853; 53°04′33″N 0°48′36″W	1297633	Governor's House More images
Remains of Newark Castle	Newark-on-Trent	Castle	c1133-1148	29 September 1950	SK7963854079; 53°04′41″N 0°48′46″W	1196278	Remains of Newark Castle More images
Town Hall	Newark-on-Trent	Town Hall and former gaol	c. 1983	29 September 1950	SK7981053908; 53°04′35″N 0°48′36″W	1196430	Town Hall More images
Church of St Wilfrid	North Muskham	Parish Church	13th century	11 August 1961	SK7982158597; 53°07′07″N 0°48′32″W	1178997	Church of St Wilfrid More images
Church of St Laurence	Norwell	Church	Early 14th century	11 August 1961	SK7756361763; 53°08′51″N 0°50′30″W	1369970	Church of St Laurence More images
Church of the Holy Rood	Ossington	Church	1782-3	11 August 1961	SK7591065156; 53°10′41″N 0°51′56″W	1045958	Church of the Holy Rood More images
Church of St Peter and St Paul	Oxton	Parish Church	12th century	11 August 1961	SK6301251398; 53°03′22″N 1°03′41″W	1285622	Church of St Peter and St Paul More images
Statue of Sphinx, 70m west of Thoresby Hall	Thoresby Park, Perlethorpe cum Budby	Statue	c. 1685	20 June 1986	SK6375871128; 53°14′00″N 1°02′47″W	1302483	Statue of Sphinx, 70m west of Thoresby Hall
Thoresby Hall and adjoining outbuildings, gate and railings	Thoresby Park, Perlethorpe cum Budby	House	Early 17th century	11 August 1961	SK6384271171; 53°14′01″N 1°02′42″W	1045449	Thoresby Hall and adjoining outbuildings, gate and railings More images
Church of Holy Trinity	Rolleston	Cross	11th century	11 August 1961	SK7418552503; 53°03′53″N 0°53′40″W	1045559	Church of Holy Trinity More images
Rufford Abbey	Rufford	Abbey	1147	18 March 1949	SK6456564780; 53°10′34″N 1°02′08″W	1302352	Rufford Abbey More images
Church of St Wilfrid	South Muskham	Parish Church	13th century	11 August 1961	SK7938657318; 53°06′26″N 0°48′56″W	1179422	Church of St Wilfrid More images
Church of St Helena	South Scarle	Parish Church	12th century	16 January 1967	SK8482664024; 53°10′00″N 0°43′57″W	1302469	Church of St Helena More images
Bishops Manor and Remains of Bishops Palace	Southwell	Archbishops Palace	1379-1396	7 August 1952	SK7015453744; 53°04′35″N 0°57′15″W	1211315	Bishops Manor and Remains of Bishops Palace More images
Minster Church of St Mary the Virgin with attached Chapter House	Southwell	Church	1120-1250	11 August 1961	SK7017153802; 53°04′37″N 0°57′14″W	1374853	Minster Church of St Mary the Virgin with attached Chapter House More images
Church of All Saints	Sutton-on-Trent	Parish Church	13th century	11 August 1961	SK8006765949; 53°11′05″N 0°48′12″W	1301889	Church of All Saints More images
Church of St Peter	Thurgarton	Church	c1119-39	11 August 1961	SK6917349192; 53°02′08″N 0°58′12″W	1045527	Church of St Peter More images
Church of St Peter and St Paul	Upton	Parish Church	13th century	11 August 1961	SK7367754271; 53°04′50″N 0°54′06″W	1369997	Church of St Peter and St Paul More images
Church of All Saints	Weston	Parish Church	13th century	11 August 1961	SK7741668015; 53°12′13″N 0°50′33″W	1179778	Church of All Saints More images
Church of St John of Jerusalem	Winkburn	Tower	17th century	11 August 1961	SK7117458310; 53°07′02″N 0°56′17″W	1285594	Church of St John of Jerusalem More images
Winkburn Hall and Attached Wall	Winkburn	Country House	c. 1700	7 August 1952	SK7119658332; 53°07′03″N 0°56′16″W	1370194	Winkburn Hall and Attached Wall More images

== Rushcliffe ==
Name	Location	Type	Completed	Date designated	Grid ref. Geo-coordinates	Entry number	Image
Church of St George	Barton in Fabis	Church	1892	13 October 1966	SK5224532758; 52°53′23″N 1°13′30″W	1248685	Church of St George More images
Church of St Mary and All Saints	Bingham	Parish Church	1225	1 December 1965	SK7074439948; 52°57′08″N 0°56′55″W	1045660	Church of St Mary and All Saints More images
Bunny Hall	Bunny	Country House	c. 1720	14 May 1952	SK5842429594; 52°51′38″N 1°08′01″W	1249018	Bunny Hall More images
Church of St Mary and adjoining wall	Bunny	Tower	14th century	13 October 1966	SK5828829598; 52°51′39″N 1°08′09″W	1248713	Church of St Mary and adjoining wall More images
Church of St Mary	Car Colston	Tower	13th century	1 December 1965	SK7208243037; 52°58′47″N 0°55′40″W	1045667	Church of St Mary More images
Remains of Church of St Mary	Colston Bassett	Church	12th century	1 December 1965	SK6949233842; 52°53′51″N 0°58′06″W	1210576	Remains of Church of St Mary More images
Church of All Saints	Cotgrave	Church	Late 14th century	1 December 1965	SK6441235344; 52°54′42″N 1°02′37″W	1277792	Church of All Saints More images
Church of St Giles	Cropwell Bishop	Church	13th century	1 December 1965	SK6847735522; 52°54′46″N 0°58′59″W	1045650	Church of St Giles More images
Church of St Peter	East Bridgford	Church	11th Century	1 December 1965	SK6908643130; 52°58′52″N 0°58′21″W	1272697	Church of St Peter More images
Church of St Mary	East Leake	Parish Church	12th century	13 October 1966	SK5517826215; 52°49′50″N 1°10′57″W	1260244	Church of St Mary More images
Church of St Augustine	Flintham	Parish Church	12th century	1 December 1965	SK7388246104; 53°00′26″N 0°54′01″W	1272726	Church of St Augustine More images
Flintham Hall and Adjoining Terrace Wall	Flintham Hall Park, Flintham	Country House	17th century	28 November 1972	SK7383946104; 53°00′26″N 0°54′04″W	1272727	Flintham Hall and Adjoining Terrace Wall More images
Church of St Lawrence	Gotham	Parish Church	13th century	13 October 1966	SK5363330083; 52°51′56″N 1°12′17″W	1260206	Church of St Lawrence More images
Church of All Saints	Granby	Church	Pre Conquest	1 December 1965	SK7510336205; 52°55′05″N 0°53′04″W	1265230	Church of All Saints More images
Church of St Luke	Hickling	Church	14th century	1 December 1965	SK6918829279; 52°51′24″N 0°58′26″W	1264986	Church of St Luke More images
Church of St Edmund	Holme Pierrepont	Parish Church	13th century	1 December 1965	SK6261639224; 52°56′48″N 1°04′10″W	1249315	Church of St Edmund More images
Holme Pierrepont Hall	Holme Pierrepont	Country House	Later 17th century	12 February 1952	SK6267139246; 52°56′49″N 1°04′08″W	1249330	Holme Pierrepont Hall More images
Church of St Mary Magdalene	Keyworth	Church	Early 15th century	1 December 1965	SK6138930836; 52°52′17″N 1°05′22″W	1039626	Church of St Mary Magdalene More images
Church of St Winifred	Kingston on Soar	Parish Church	c. 1540	13 October 1966	SK5018427742; 52°50′41″N 1°15′23″W	1242066	Church of St Winifred More images
Church of St Andrew	Langar, Langar cum Barnstone	Church	1712	1 December 1965	SK7212734652; 52°54′16″N 0°55′45″W	1264793	Church of St Andrew More images
Church of St James	Normanton on Soar	Parish Church	13th century	13 October 1966	SK5187222912; 52°48′05″N 1°13′55″W	1242162	Church of St James More images
Church of St Mary	Orston	Tower	1766	1 December 1965	SK7694041184; 52°57′45″N 0°51′22″W	1272710	Church of St Mary More images
Church of Holy Trinity	Ratcliffe on Soar	Parish Church	13th century	13 October 1966	SK4948328898; 52°51′19″N 1°16′00″W	1242163	Church of Holy Trinity More images
Church of St John of Beverley	Scarrington	Tower	Early 14th century	1 December 1965	SK7349641597; 52°58′00″N 0°54′26″W	1272713	Church of St John of Beverley More images
Church of St Wilfrid	Screveton	Church	15th century	1 December 1965	SK7288043414; 52°58′59″N 0°54′57″W	1243811	Church of St Wilfrid More images
Church of St Peter	Sibthorpe	Church	13th century	1 December 1965	SK7639345409; 53°00′02″N 0°51′47″W	1244670	Church of St Peter More images
Pigeoncote, Church Lane	Sibthorpe	Dovecote	14th century	1 December 1965	SK7649845396; 53°00′02″N 0°51′42″W	1243820	Pigeoncote, Church Lane More images
Church of St John the Baptist	Stanford on Soar	Parish Church	13th century	13 October 1966	SK5433422004; 52°47′34″N 1°11′44″W	1242187	Church of St John the Baptist More images
Church of St Helena	Thoroton	Church	14th century	1 December 1965	SK7648242531; 52°58′29″N 0°51′45″W	1272720	Church of St Helena More images
Thrumpton Hall and attached range of outbuildings	Thrumpton Hall Park, Thrumpton	Country House	1617	14 May 1952	SK5073031259; 52°52′35″N 1°14′52″W	1242464	Thrumpton Hall and attached range of outbuildings More images
Church of the Holy Trinity	Tithby Village, Tithby	Church	14th century	1 December 1965	SK6984036944; 52°55′31″N 0°57′45″W	1235979	Church of the Holy Trinity More images
Church of St Luke	Upper Broughton	Church	c. 1200	23 June 1989	SK6834226238; 52°49′46″N 0°59′14″W	1264583	Church of St Luke More images
Church of St Mary and All Saints	Willoughby on the Wolds	Parish Church	13th century	13 October 1966	SK6338525418; 52°49′21″N 1°03′39″W	1242526	Church of St Mary and All Saints More images
Holy Trinity Church	Wysall	Parish Church	12th century	13 October 1966	SK6042427131; 52°50′18″N 1°06′16″W	1259980	Holy Trinity Church More images

== See also ==
- Category:Grade I listed buildings in Nottinghamshire
- Grade II* listed buildings in Nottinghamshire
