= Rushcliffe Wapentake =

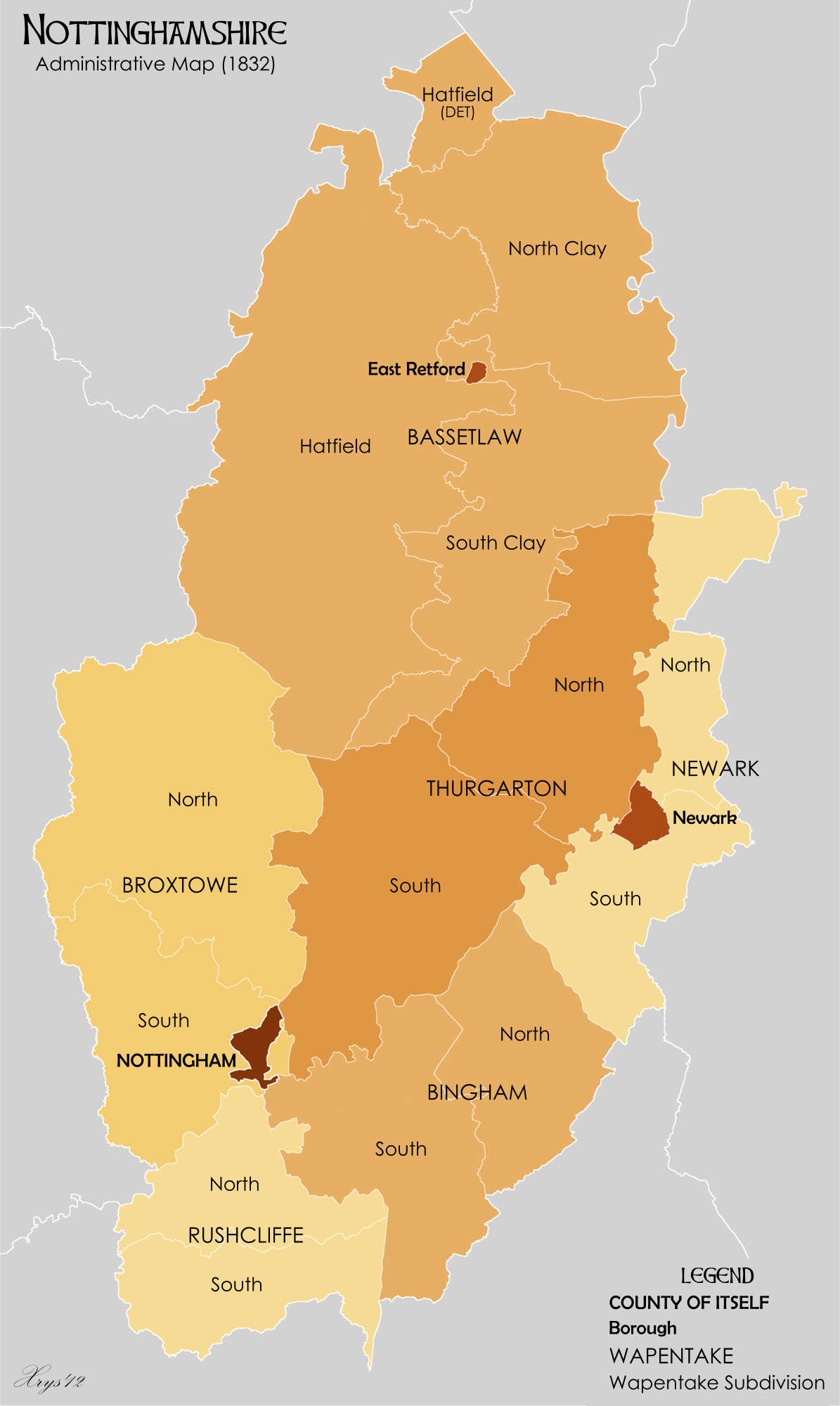
Map showing the Rushcliffe wapentake

Rushcliffe was a wapentake (administrative area, equivalent to a hundred) of the historic county of Nottinghamshire, England. It was in the south of the county, on the south side of the River Trent, covering the parishes of Barton in Fabis, Bradmore, Bunny, Clifton with Glapton, Costock, East Leake, Edwalton, Gotham, Keyworth, Kingston on Soar, Normanton on Soar, Plumtree, Ratcliffe on Soar, Rempstone, Ruddington, Stanford on Soar, Stanton-on-the-Wolds, Sutton Bonington, Thorpe in the Glebe, Thrumpton, West Leake, Widmerpool, Wilford, Willoughby on the Wolds and Wysall.

Contained within the boundaries of the wapentake is the western part of the current Rushcliffe borough and a small area of the City of Nottingham around Clifton.

== Etymology ==
Rushcliffe means "cliff where brushwood grows", from Old English hris "brushwood" and clif "cliff". The name was recorded as Riselclif in an undated source.
