= Listed buildings in Maplebeck =

Maplebeck is a civil parish in the Newark and Sherwood district of Nottinghamshire, England. The parish contains five listed buildings that are recorded in the National Heritage List for England. Of these, one is listed at Grade I, the highest of the three grades, and the others are at Grade II, the lowest grade. The parish contains the village of Maplebeck and the surrounding area. All the listed buildings are in the village, and consist of a church, two farmhouses, a house, and a telephone kiosk.

== Key ==
Grade	Criteria
I	Buildings of exceptional interest, sometimes considered to be internationally important
II	Buildings of national importance and special interest

== Buildings ==
Name and location	Photograph	Date	Notes	Grade
St Radegund's Church; 53.13931°N 0.93879°W		13th century	The church has been altered and extended through the centuries, and was restored in 1898 by C. Hodgson Fowler. It is built in stone with a tile roof, and consists of a nave and a north aisle under a continuous roof, a south porch, a chancel and a west steeple. The steeple has a single stage, diagonal buttresses, a chamfered top band, and an octagonal broach spire with four lucarnes and a weathercock. On the west is a doorway with a chamfered surround, above which is a lancet window with an ogee head.	I
Low Farmhouse; 53.13886°N 0.93803°W		Late 16th century	The farmhouse has a timber framed core with brick nogging, it is roughcast and painted on the exterior, and has a pantile roof. There are two storeys and an L-shaped plan, with a front range of four bays, and two gabled rear wings. The doorway has moulded jambs, and the windows are a mix of casements and sashes, one of the latter horizontally-sliding. At the rear is a stair turret.	II
Maplebeck Farmhouse; 53.13857°N 0.93662°W		1729	The farmhouse is in brick, partly rendered, on a rendered plinth, with floor bands, cogged and dentilled eaves, and a tile roof. There are two storeys, attics and cellars, and an L-shaped plan, with a front range of three bays, a rear wing, and a lean-to in the angle. Steps lead up to the central doorway that has moulded jambs and a fanlight. The windows are a mix of casements and sashes, some of the latter horizontally-sliding, and on the east front is a round-headed stair window.	II
Maplebeck House; 53.13861°N 0.93689°W		Early 19th century	The house is in brick with a tile roof. There are two storeys and attics, and an L-shaped plan, with a front range of three bays, and a rear wing. The doorway has plain jambs and a fanlight, and the windows on the front are sashes, the openings in the ground floor with segmental heads. In the east gable is a small casement window, and the west gable contains a casement window and a corbelled bow window.	II
Telephone kiosk 53.13890°N 0.93860°W		1935	The K6 type telephone kiosk was designed by Giles Gilbert Scott. Constructed in cast iron with a square plan and a dome, it has three unperforated crowns in the top panels.	II
