= St George's Church, Barton in Fabis =

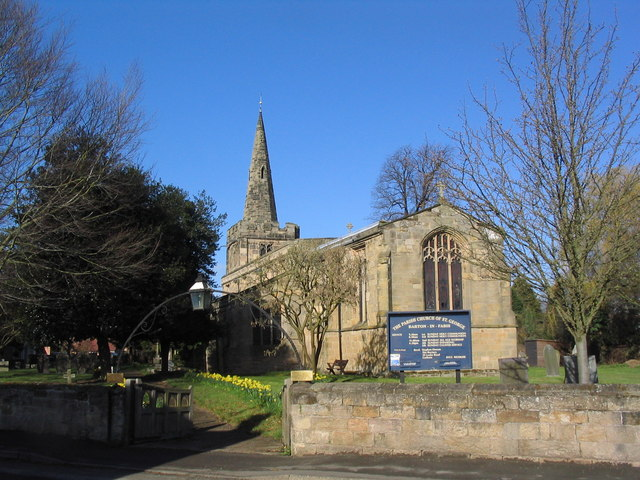
- St George's Church, Barton in Fabis
- 52°53′23″N 01°13′30″W
- Denomination: Church of England
- Churchmanship: Low Church / Evangelical
- Website: 453churches.com

History
- Dedication: St. George

Administration
- Province: York
- Diocese: Southwell and Nottingham
- Archdeaconry: Nottingham
- Deanery: West Bingham
- Parish: Barton in Fabis

St George's Church is a parish church in the Church of England in Barton in Fabis, Nottinghamshire.

== History ==
The church is medieval and is a Grade I listed building. St George's Church was restored in 1855 by Thomas Chambers Hine. Between 1931 and 1934 the nave roof and parapet were repaired at a cost of £725 by Charles Marriott Oldrid Scott, architect, and Thomas Long, builder.

The church is famous for the alabaster tomb in the chancel dating from 1616 with reclining effigies of William and Tabitha Sacheverell.

== Incumbents ==
- 1266 Bartholomew
- 1270 Henry Sampson
- ???? Henry de Barton
- 1288 Adam de Hamundesham
- 1326 John de Blebury
- 1328 John de Mekesburgh
- 1343 Thomas de Birton de Stapilford
- 1356 Walter de Birton
- 1357 William de Conyngton
- 1398 Richard Arnall
- 1405 John Normanby
- 1406 William Senster
- 1408 Ric [Henricus] Killom
- 1415 John Hill de Farlesthorp
- 1442 William Findern
- 1458 Oliver Blakwell
- 1495 Martin Colyns
- 1508 John Thorman
- 1550 James Wheatley
- 1577 Archibald Lucas Gilpin
- 1587 John Cooke
- 1599 Thomas Bowes
- 1612 Thomas Ireland
- 1615 Francis Higginson
- 1616 Ralph Hansbie
- 1635-37 John Neyle
- 1641 Barnaby Barlowe
- 1650 Jonathan Goodwin
- 1671 Robert Field
- 1676 Jer Coadworth
- 1686 Samuel Crowborough
- 1691 William Pearson
- 1692 Andrew Lorley
- 1720 Joseph Milner
- 1751 John Wickliffe
- 1769 Henry Forster Mills
- 1792 Robert Markham
- 1806 John Storer
- 1827 Hon J S Venables Vernon
- 1828 John Fyre
- 1829 Fitzgerald Wintour
- 1865 Lloyd Bruce
- 1872 James Sweet
- 1878 Christopher Albert Hodgson
- 1916 William Gallagher
- 1920 Henry Meaden
- 1924 Joseph Poole
- 1929 Ernest Bardsley (formerly vicar of St Andrew's Church, Nottingham)
- 1940 F. Turney
- 1941 Frederick Byron, 10th Baron Byron
- 1942 Reginald Bidwell
- 1947 Harold Pritchard
- 1960 Arnold Hill
- 1964 Stephen Forbes-Adam
- 1970 Robin Protheroe
- 1973 Andrew Woodsford
- 1982 Alistair Sutherland
- 1997 Richard Spray
- 2001 Stephen Osman
- 2011 Richard Coleman

== Parish structure ==
It is part of an informal grouping of five churches that are known collectively as "The 453 Churches" as they straddle the A453. The other churches in the group are:

- St. Lawrence's Church, Gotham
- St. Winifred's Church, Kingston on Soar
- Holy Trinity Church, Ratcliffe-on-Soar
- All Saints’ Church, Thrumpton

== Organ ==
The two manual pipe organ dates from 1893 and is by the builder Alexander Young. It was installed in 1965. It came from Wincham Methodist Church. A specification of the organ can be found on the National Pipe Organ Register.

== Bells ==
The west tower contains a ring of six bells.

== See also ==
- Grade I listed buildings in Nottinghamshire
- Listed buildings in Barton in Fabis
