= Listed buildings in Kingston on Soar =

Kingston on Soar is a civil parish in the Rushcliffe district of Nottinghamshire, England. The parish contains 19 listed buildings that are recorded in the National Heritage List for England. Of these, one is listed at Grade I, the highest of the three grades, and the others are at Grade II, the lowest grade. The parish contains the village of Kingston on Soar and the surrounding countryside. The listed buildings include a church, its lychgate, a country house and associated structures, smaller houses and cottages, farmhouses and farm buildings, a bridge, a canal lock, a pumphouse, and a telephone kiosk.

== Key ==
Grade	Criteria
I	Buildings of exceptional interest, sometimes considered to be internationally important
II	Buildings of national importance and special interest

== Buildings ==
Name and location	Photograph	Date	Notes	Grade
St Winifred's Church; 52.84489°N 1.25629°W		c. 1540	The oldest parts of the church are the chancel and the chancel aisle, the rest of the church being rebuilt in 1900. It is in stone with tile roofs, and consists of a nave, a south aisle, a south porch, a north vestry, a chancel with an aisle, and a southwest tower. The tower has two stages, a northeast stair turret, lancet windows, a clock face, two-light bell openings, and an embattled parapet with corner crocketed pinnacles.	I
The Post Office; 52.84481°N 1.25815°W		Mid 17th century	The building is in red brick with some timber framing and a tile roof. There is a single storey and attics, and four bays, and at the rear is a range with a timber framed core. On the front are two doorways with hoods, fixed lights and a casement window, and above are two gabled dormers.	II
Church Farmhouse; 52.84542°N 1.25501°W	—	Early 18th century	The farmhouse, which was extended later in the 18th century, is in brick, and has tile roofs with brick coped gables. The original part is in red and blue brick chequering, and has a gabled front of two storeys and an attic, and a single bay. There are floor bands, a canted bay window, and sash windows under segmental arches. Recessed on the left is the later range, with a raised eaves band, two storeys and four bays. On the front is a porch, and a doorway with a fanlight, and to the left are further wings.	II
Kingston Fields Farmhouse and workshops 52.84756°N 1.23406°W	—	Mid 18th century	The building is in red brick, with a floor band, dentilled eaves, and a slate roof with brick coped gables. There are two storeys and attics, and nine bays. On the front are two doorways, one with a sloping hood, and windows, which are a mix of sashes, some with segmental heads, and casements.	II
Manor Farmhouse; 52.84445°N 1.25923°W	—	Mid 18th century	The farmhouse, later divided into two houses, is in red brick with dogtooth and dentilled eaves, and a tile roof with brick coped gables and kneelers. There are two storeys and attics, and five bays. Four semicircular steps lead up to the central doorway that has reeded pilasters and an open pediment. The windows are sashes under segmental arches.	II
Stables, Manor Farm; 52.84464°N 1.25886°W	—	Mid 18th century	The stables are in red brick, and have a tile roof with brick coped gables and kneelers. There are two storeys and seven bays, and to the right is a single-storey, five-bay range. The openings vary, and include doorways, louvred openings, fixed lights, and a horizontally-sliding sash window.	II
Kegworth Bridge; 52.84038°N 1.26904°W		1785	The bridge, which was widened in 1937, carries Station Road over the River Soar. It is in stone, and consists of five semicircular arches with cutwaters rising to pilasters. Above the arches is a band and a coped parapet, and on the south side of the bridge is an inscribed plaque.	II
Kegworth Shallow Lock; 52.84055°N 1.26767°W		Early 19th century	The lock is on the Loughborough Navigation on the River Soar. The chamber is in stone, and at both ends are gates in timber and iron.	II
Kingston Hall; 52.84622°N 1.24880°W		1842–46	A country house, later divided into flats, it was designed by Edward Blore. The house is in stone, with a moulded plinth band, quoins, and slate roofs with stone coped gables, and kneelers with decorative finials. The garden front has sill bands, corbel tables, open parapets, two storeys and attics, and five gabled bays, the outer bays projecting and with larger gables. In the centre is an arched doorway, flanked by smaller doorways, all with mullioned fanlights and Tudor-style hood moulds. Each outer bay contains a two-storey canted bay window, and the other windows are mullioned and transomed. To the right is a four-stage tower with a conical roof. On the entrance front is a porch with octagonal turrets at the angles, and a dome with finials. The doorway has a four-centred arch, decorative spandrels, a fanlight and a hood mould. At right angles is a seven-bay service wing.	II
Pavilion, Kingston Hall; 52.84585°N 1.24837°W	—	1842–46	The pavilion in the garden of the hall was designed by Edward Blore. It is in stone on a plinth, and has a pyramidal stone slate roof on which is an octagonal cupola with open oval panels, a panelled frieze, and a conical lead roof with a finial. There is a single storey and a single bay, and a square plan. The pavilion has clasping pilasters and a corbel table. On the west side is an arched entrance flanked by columns with moulded capitals, raised panelled spandrels, and a pendant keystone. The other sides contain blind slit vents with quoined surrounds.	II
Stable block, Kingston Hall; 52.84664°N 1.24788°W	—	1842–46	The stable block, which was designed by Edward Blore, has been converted for residential use. It is in stone on a plinth, with buttresses, a corbel table, and a slate roof with stone coped gables, kneelers and ridge finials. There is a single storey and attics, and seven bays. The middle projects slightly, it contains an entrance with a double-chamfered surround and a Tudor arch, above which is an arched opening, a clock face, and on the roof is a cupola. In the outer bays are gabled dormers, and a small gabled opening for pigeons.	II
Lodge and gateway 52.84805°N 1.24966°W		1846	The lodge and gateway to Kingston Hall were designed by Edward Blore. The lodge is in stone on a chamfered plinth, and has a slate roof with stone coped gables, kneelers and ridge finials. There is a single storey and attics, and three bays. The middle bay is gabled, it projects and contains a canted bay window, over which is a two-light mullioned casement window with a Tudor-style hood mould. To the right is an open low stone wall with moulded coping. The entrance to the grounds is flanked by stone piers, each with a moulded base, foliate decoration, and at the top is moulded coping and a lion holding a shield. Between the piers are decorative double iron gates, and outside them are smaller gates and piers with orb finials.	II
1, 3, 5 and 7 The Green; 52.84489°N 1.25781°W		1840s	A row of four estate cottages in red brick on a plinth, with stone dressings, and slate roofs with brick coped gables. There is a single storey and attics, and eight bays. The porches have pyramidal roofs, and the windows are casements with quoined surrounds and mullions.	II
9, 11, 15, 17, and 19 The Green; 52.84504°N 1.25727°W		1840s	A row of four estate cottages in red brick on a plinth, with stone dressings, and slate roofs with brick coped gables. There is a single storey and attics, and eleven bays. The porches have pyramidal roofs, in the centre is a doorway with a segmental head, and the windows are casements with quoined surrounds and mullions.	II
21, 23, 25 and 27 The Green; 52.84505°N 1.25676°W		1840s	A row of four estate cottages in red brick on a plinth, with stone dressings, and slate roofs with brick coped gables. There is a single storey and attics, and eleven bays. The porches have pyramidal roofs, in the centre is a doorway with a segmental head, and the windows are casements with quoined surrounds and mullions.	II
The Old Schoolhouse; 52.84595°N 1.25361°W		1848	The school, master's house and reading room were extended in 1891, and converted into a house in about 1970. The building is in brick with stone dressings, and a Welsh slate roof with moulded brick coped gables and kneelers with finials. The centre is recessed, and to its left is a projecting gabled porch, the doorway with a moulded surround and a four-centred arch, and further to the left is the master's house, projecting further and gabled, with a lean-to. To the right of the centre is the projecting gabled reading room, with an inscribed plaque in the gable, and to the right of that is another gabled porch. The windows are casements, some with mullions, and the others are cross-casements.	II
Pumphouse; 52.84469°N 1.25684°W		Late 19th century	The pumphouse on The Green has four chamfered wooden posts on plinths carrying a pyramidal tile roof with a finial. The interior is paved with blue and red bricks and stone, and in the centre is a pump encased in wood. On the north side is an iron spout and a stone trough, and on two sides are wooden benches.	II
Lychgate; 52.84462°N 1.25621°W		1902	The lychgate at the entrance to the churchyard of St Winifred's Church is flanked by stone walls, on which is a timber superstructure, and a gableted slate roof with a cross finial. In each gable is a trefoil, the beams are inscribed, and the double gates are in wood and iron.	II
Telephone kiosk 52.84471°N 1.25757°W		1935	The K6 type telephone kiosk in Main Street was designed by Giles Gilbert Scott. Constructed in cast iron with a square plan and a dome, it has three unperforated crowns in the top panels.	II
