= Kingston Hall, Nottinghamshire =

Grade II country house in Nottinghamshire

Kingston Hall
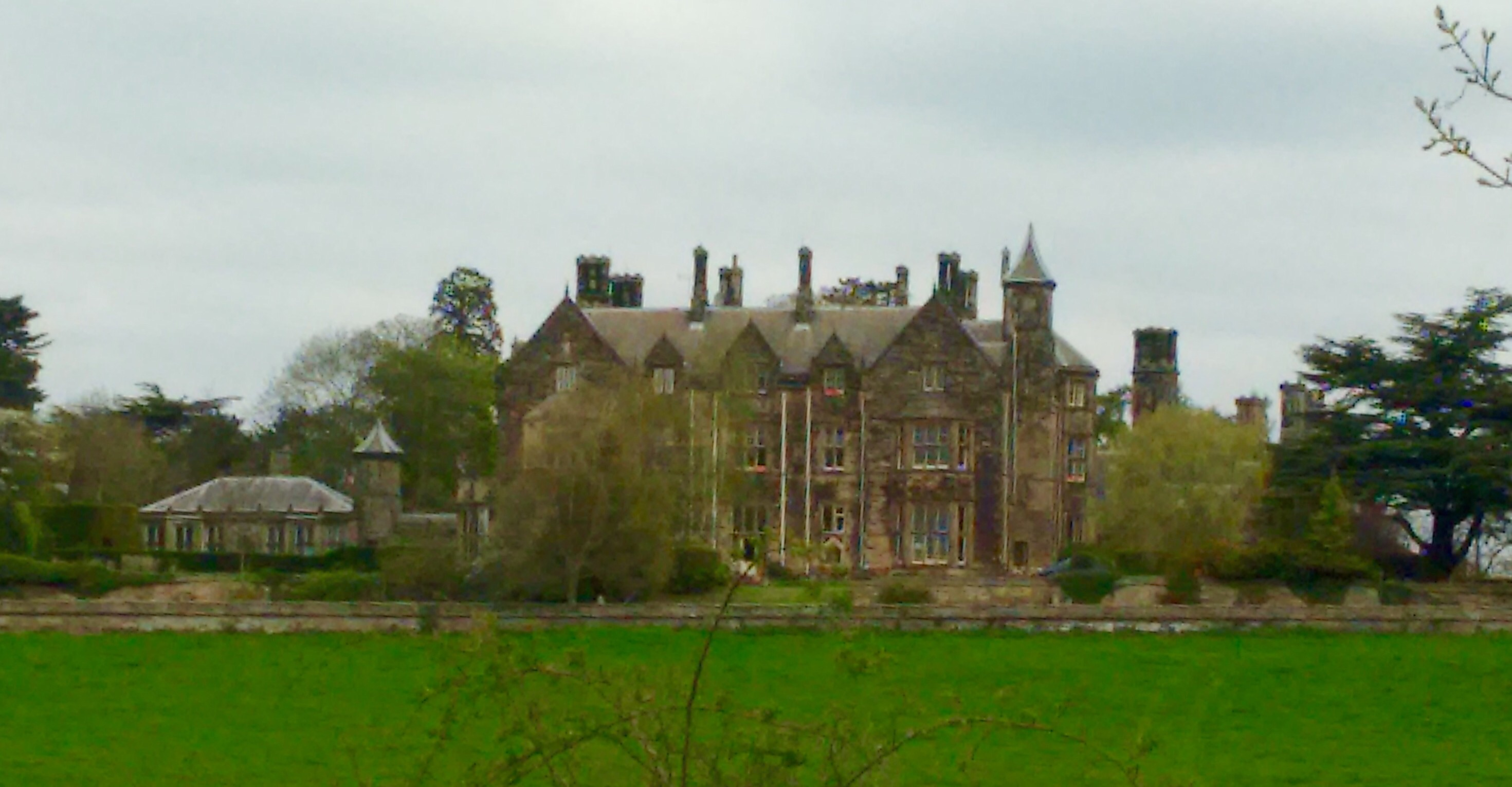
- 2015

- Location within Nottinghamshire

General information
- Location: Kingston on Soar, Nottingham, England
- Coordinates: 52.845958°N 1.248812°W
- Construction started: 1842
- Completed: 1846
- Client: Edward Strutt, 1st Baron Belper

Design and construction
- Architect: Edward Blore

Kingston Hall is a country house in Kingston on Soar, Nottinghamshire.

It was built between 1842 and 1846 to designs by the architect Edward Blore for Edward Strutt, 1st Baron Belper. It was made a Grade II listed building in 1987.

The grounds of Kingston Hall contains a Grade II listed Pavilion and a Grade II listed stable block.

In 1916 it was the birthplace of Lavinia Mary Strutt, (later Lavinia Fitzalan-Howard, Duchess of Norfolk), daughter of Algernon Strutt, 3rd Baron Belper and his wife, Eva Strutt.

It was subdivided into separate apartments in 1977.

== See also ==
- Listed buildings in Kingston on Soar
