= Listed buildings in Ratcliffe-on-Soar =

Ratcliffe-on-Soar is a civil parish in the Rushcliffe district of Nottinghamshire, England. The parish contains four listed buildings that are recorded in the National Heritage List for England. Of these, one is listed at Grade I, the highest of the three grades, and the others are at Grade II, the lowest grade. The parish contains the village of Ratcliffe-on-Soar and the surrounding area. The listed buildings consist of a church, a farmhouse, a bridge and a canal lock, and a pair of railway tunnel portals.

== Key ==
Grade	Criteria
I	Buildings of exceptional interest, sometimes considered to be internationally important
II	Buildings of national importance and special interest

== Buildings ==
Name and location	Photograph	Date	Notes	Grade
Holy Trinity Church; 52.85531°N 1.26663°W		13th century	The church has been altered and extended through the centuries, including a restoration in 1891. It is built in stone with some red brick, and has roofs of slate and lead. The church consists of a nave with a clerestory, north and south aisles, a south porch, a chancel, a north chapel, and a west steeple. The steeple has a tower with three stages on a plinth with a band, with quoins, lancet windows, bands, two-light bell openings, a corbel table, corner pinnacles, and a broach spire with two tiers of lucarnes. Along the nave, chancel and north aisle are parapets.	I
Manor Farmhouse; 52.85444°N 1.26740°W	—	Early 18th century	The farmhouse is in red brick on a stone plinth, with floor bands, and a tile roof with brick coped gables and kneelers. There are two storeys and attics, and a double pile plan, with a front of three bays, and a central porch. The windows in the ground floor are sashes, in the upper floor they are cross-casements, all with brick wedge lintels, and the attic contains casement windows, each with a segmental arch and a keystone. To the right and recessed is a wing with two storeys and a cellar, and two bays.	II
Red Hill Lock and Packhorse Bridge; 52.86814°N 1.27019°W		Late 18th century	The bridge crosses a lock on the Loughborough Navigation of the River Soar. It is in red brick and consists of a single semicircular arch with a keystone, a band, and a parapet with stone coping. The walls sweep round and end in brick piers. The lock is in stone with some repairs in blue brick and concrete, and it has two wood and iron gates.	II
South portals, Redhill Tunnel; 52.87083°N 1.26462°W	—	1838–40	The tunnel portals were built by the Midland Railway, the west portal was the earlier, and the east portal was built in 1892–93. The west portal is in sandstone and has a semicircular arch, with voussoirs returning as quoins in the soffit of the tunnel. The arch springs from a moulded impost band, extending to form the cornice of the flanking pedestals that support pilasters. Above is a string course forming the architrave of the entablature that has a frieze and a moulded cornice, and above is a parapet. The east portal is in blue engineering brick with stone dressings, and consists of a horseshoe arch flanked by piers, and with a stone parapet.	II
