= Listed buildings in Gotham, Nottinghamshire =

Gotham is a civil parish in the Rushcliffe district of Nottinghamshire, England. The parish contains five listed buildings that are recorded in the National Heritage List for England. Of these, one is listed at Grade I, the highest of the three grades, and the others are at Grade II, the lowest grade. The parish contains the village of Gotham and the surrounding area. All the listed buildings are in the village, and consist of a church, a house, a former barn, a school and a well house converted into a shelter.

== Key ==
Grade	Criteria
I	Buildings of exceptional interest, sometimes considered to be internationally important
II	Buildings of national importance and special interest

== Buildings ==
Name and location	Photograph	Date	Notes	Grade
St Lawrence's Church; 52.86561°N 1.20476°W		13th century	The church has been altered and extended through the centuries, including alterations in 1789 and 1869. It is built in stone and red brick, and the aisles are stuccoed. The church consists of a nave with a clerestory, north and south aisles, a south porch, a north porch converted into a vestry, a chancel and a west steeple. The steeple has an unbuttressed tower with three stages, a chamfered plinth, bands, a corbel table, and a spire splayed at the base, with two tiers of lucarnes. There is a west arched doorway with a moulded and chamfered surround and a hood mould, and elsewhere are lancet windows, stair lights, clock faces and two-light bell openings.	I
The Manor; 52.86515°N 1.20424°W		16th century	The house, which has a timber framed core, has been extended and altered. It is in red brick with some blue brick chequering and stone, and tile roofs. There are two storeys and attics, and a front of three gabled bays with scalloped bargeboards. In the middle bay is a gabled porch with bargeboards and an arched entrance, and most of the windows are casements with hood moulds. To the left are later extensions, and inside there is much surviving timber framing.	II
Store at bus depot 52.8644°N 1.20605°W		Mid 17th century	A barn, later used for other purposes, with a timber framed core, encased in red brick and partly rendered, with a slate roof. There is a single storey and four bays, and a lean-to porch. It contains garage doors and fixed lights.	II
Gotham Primary School; 52.86695°N 1.20951°W		1879	The school is in red brick on a plinth, with dressings in blue brick and stone, floor bands, a decorative eaves band, and a tile roof with stone coped gables and finials. There is a single storey, nine bays, and four gables. The doorways have pointed arches and hood moulds, and the windows either have fixed lights or are casements. One gable contains a lettered and dated panel with a shield, surrounded by dogtooth brickwork, and two others contain roundels.	II
The Wellhouse; 52.86596°N 1.20485°W		1885	The well house, later a shelter, has a low hexagonal wall with cast iron railings, containing a gate. Six hexagonal posts with decorative braces carry a pyramidal tile roof with a finial. Inside, there is a hexagonal stone block.	II
