= Holy Trinity Church, Ratcliffe-on-Soar =

Church in Ratcliffe-on-Soar, Nottinghamshire, England

Holy Trinity Church, Ratcliffe on Soar
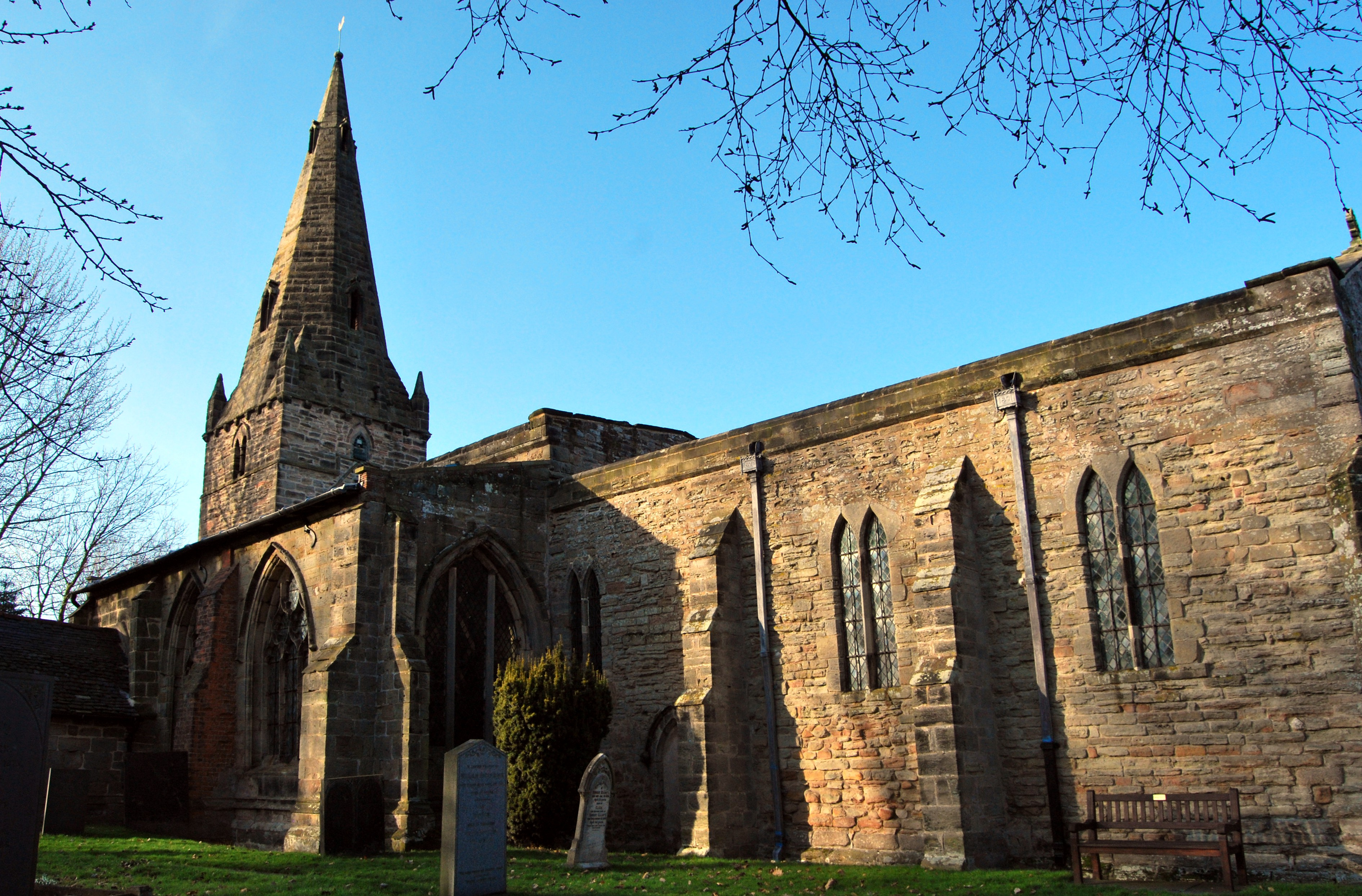
- Holy Trinity Church, Ratcliffe on Soar
- Holy Trinity Church, Ratcliffe on Soar
- 52°51′19.080″N 1°15′59.688″W
- OS grid reference: SK 49483 28898
- Location: Ratcliffe-on-Soar
- Country: England
- Denomination: Church of England
- Churchmanship: Low Church / Evangelical
- Website: 453churches.com

History
- Dedication: Holy Trinity

Architecture
- Heritage designation: Grade I listed

Administration
- Province: York
- Diocese: Southwell and Nottingham
- Archdeaconry: Nottingham
- Deanery: West Bingham
- Parish: Ratcliffe-on-Soar

Holy Trinity Church, Ratcliffe-on-Soar is a Grade I listed parish church in the Church of England in Ratcliffe-on-Soar.

It is part of an informal grouping of five churches that are known collectively as "The 453 Churches" as they straddle the A453. The other churches in the group are:

- St. Lawrence's Church, Gotham
- St. George's Church, Barton in Fabis
- St. Winifred's Church, Kingston on Soar
- All Saints’ Church, Thrumpton

== History ==
The church dates from the 13th century. Major restoration work was carried out in 1886, paid for by Earl Howe at a cost of £830.

== Incumbents ==
- 1239 W De-Shenedon
- 1270 Henry de Halton
- 1292 Richard de Hertford
- ???? John de Sandale
- 1326 Walter de Alford
- 1331 John Gerard
- 1342 Walter de Melburn
- ???? Robert de Treford
- 1352 John de Ditton
- 1359 Henry de Blakeburn
- 1359 John de Kyneton
- 1385 Thomas de Basford
- 1391 Richard Gower
- ???? Richard Balle
- 1416 Richard de Wynwyke
- ???? John Ray
- 1419 William Hickson
- ???? William Wilme
- 1429 Hugo Beton
- ???? Richard Ives
- 1450 Laurence Whalley
- 1461 James Allerton
- 1471 John Buttiller
- 1478 John Prescott
- 1497 Henry Riding
- 1497 Hector Ridyng
- 1509 Thomas Wynter
- 1543 John Rolston
- 1553 John Drewry
- 1579 Edward Barwell
- 1579 John Alrede
- 1590 Thomas Banham
- 1634 Richard Francell
- 1653 R Hancock
- 1662 H Grove
- 1668 Robert Holmes
- 1688 John Gilbert
- 1730 Thomas Poynton
- 1765 James Deavin
- 1768 Thomas Bentley
- 1778 John Topham
- 1783 Richard Dodsley
- 1791 Edward Smith
- 1800 R D Flamstead
- 1830 William Phelps
- 1835 J J Vaughan
- 1882 F A Wodehouse
- 1916 R O Jones
- 1932 C V Brown
- 1936 H N Wrigley
- 1940 P F New
- 1943 B P Hall
- 1946 J F F Marton
- 1953 C Brailsford
- 1958 J M Williams
- 1963 J W Mayer
- 1970 N Copeland
- 1971 ? Yates
- 1971 J Gibson
- 1972 A D Williams
- 1981 A C Sutherland
- 1996 David Gorrick
- ???? Richard Spray
- 2001 Stephen Osman
- 2011 Richard Coleman

== Memorials ==
The church contains a number of memorials to the Sacheverell family including

- An alabaster monument to Henrie Sacheverell, died 1625
- An alabaster monument to Henrie and Jane Sacheverell, c. 1590
- An alabaster monument to Henry Sacheverell and his wife, 1558
- An alabaster monument to Ralph Sacheverell and his wife, 1539,

== Organ ==
The church has a single manual pipe organ which was purchased from St. Winifred's Church, Kingston on Soar in 1936 for a total cost of £29. It was originally hand pumped at a salary of 15 shillings per year. An electric blower was fitted in 1946. It was moved to the north aisle in 1973. A specification of the organ can be found on the National Pipe Organ Register.

== Bells ==
There are three bells in the tower but they are of irregular interval so when chimed together they do not sound musical.

== See also ==
- Grade I listed buildings in Nottinghamshire
- Listed buildings in Ratcliffe-on-Soar
