= All Saints Church, Thrumpton =

All Saints’ Church, Thrumpton
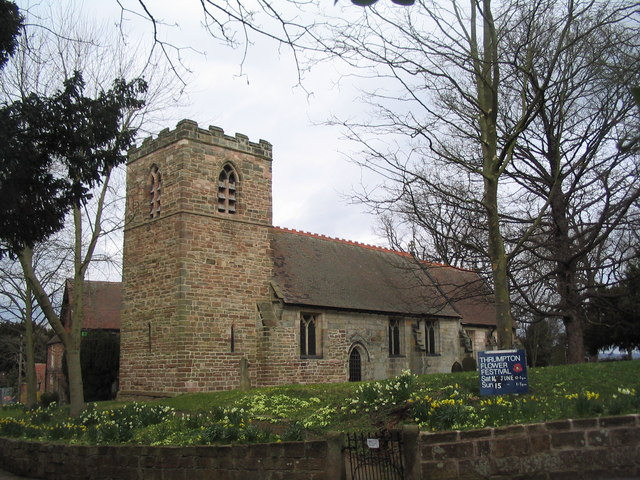
- All Saints’ Church, Thrumpton
- All Saints’ Church, Thrumpton
- 52°52′32.46″N 1°14′39.43″W
- OS grid reference: SK 50974 31162
- Location: Thrumpton
- Country: England
- Denomination: Church of England
- Churchmanship: Low Church / Evangelical
- Website: 453churches.com

History
- Dedication: All Saints

Architecture
- Heritage designation: Grade II* listed

Administration
- Province: York
- Diocese: Southwell and Nottingham
- Archdeaconry: Nottingham
- Deanery: West Bingham
- Parish: Thrumpton

All Saints’ Church, Thrumpton is a Grade II* listed parish church in the Church of England in Thrumpton, Nottinghamshire. A stone font in the churchyard is Grade II listed.

It is part of an informal grouping of five churches that are known collectively as "The 453 Churches" as they straddle the A453. The other churches in the group are:

- St. Lawrence's Church, Gotham
- St. George's Church, Barton in Fabis
- St. Winifred's Church, Kingston on Soar
- Holy Trinity Church, Ratcliffe-on-Soar

== History ==
The church dates from the 13th century and was restored in 1871 by George Edmund Street.

In 1870 the chancel was rebuilt and the nave restored by architect G E Street.

The tower was repaired and restored in 2004.

== Incumbents ==
As Thrumpton was a chapelry of Ratcliffe until the 16th century it is probable that it was administered by a curate. A change took place in the 17th century following the fall of the Powdrells and later the Pigotts moved to appoint a preacher. From 1950 Thrumpton ceased to have its own priest the living being shared with Barton and later Gotham.

- 1553 Robert Smythe
- 1587 John Fullsborer
- 1596 Hugh Blunt
- 1617 Thomas Goodwin
- 1650 Ferdinando Poole
- 1667 Philip Ormston
- 1672 Richard Wilson
- 1674 William Kayes
- 1679 Gowin Knight
- 1684 John Gilbert
- 1723 John Savage
- 1748 Thomas Bentley
- 1777 John Topsham
- 1787 William Beetham
- 1798 Thomas Stevenson
- 1804 John Henry Browne
- 1811 William Cantrell
- 1856 Richard Hall
- 1857 John Cartwright Jones
- 1863 Philip Henry Douglas
- 1914 Frederick Byron, 10th Baron Byron
- 1942 Reginald Alfred Bidwell
- 1947 Harold Theophilus Pritchard
- 1960 Arnold Draper Hill
- 1965 Stephen Timothy Forbes Adam
- 1970 Robin Philip Protheroe
- 1973 Andrew Norman Woodsford
- 1981 Alistair Sutherland
- 1996 Richard Spray
- 2001 Steve Osman
- 2011 Richard Coleman

== See also ==
- Grade II* listed buildings in Nottinghamshire
- Listed buildings in Thrumpton
