= St Lawrence's Church, Gotham =

St. Lawrence’s Church, Gotham
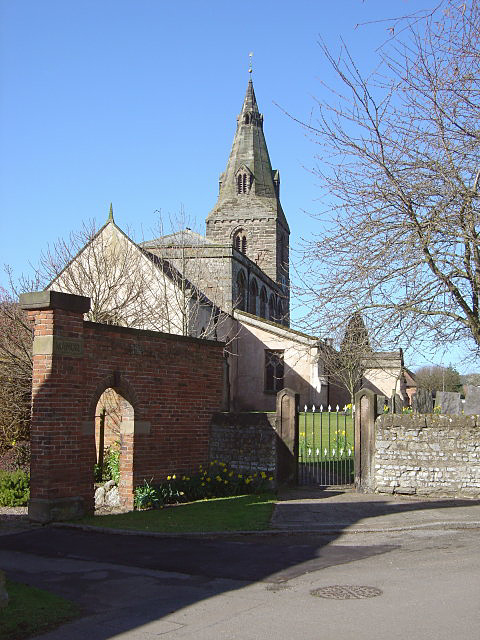
- St. Lawrence’s Church, Gotham
- St. Lawrence’s Church, Gotham
- 52°51′56.59″N 1°12′17.81″W
- OS grid reference: SK 53633 30083
- Location: Gotham, Nottinghamshire
- Country: England
- Denomination: Church of England
- Churchmanship: Low Church / Evangelical
- Website: 453churches.com

History
- Dedication: St. Lawrence

Architecture
- Heritage designation: Grade I listed

Administration
- Province: York
- Diocese: Southwell and Nottingham
- Archdeaconry: Nottingham
- Deanery: West Bingham
- Parish: Gotham

St. Lawrence's Church, Gotham is a Grade I listed parish church in the Church of England in Gotham, Nottinghamshire.

It is part of an informal grouping of five churches that are known collectively as "The 453 Churches" as they straddle the A453. The other churches in the group are:

- St. George's Church, Barton in Fabis
- St. Winifred's Church, Kingston on Soar
- Holy Trinity Church, Ratcliffe-on-Soar
- All Saints’ Church, Thrumpton

== History ==
The church dates from the 13th century and was restored in 1789 and repaired in 1869.

A new clock for the tower designed and constructed by Reuben Bosworth at a cost of £70 was installed in 1848. It comprised two dials, one facing the town street, and the other the road from Nottingham to Leake.

St. Lawrence, Gotham is the largest of the five churches and was re-ordered in 2010 to create a flexible modern worship space that is used for many different events throughout the year.

== Incumbents ==
- ???? Robert de Nottingham
- ???? Saher de St Andrew
- ???? Richard de Role
- ???? Peter de Leyke
- 1303 John de Gotham
- 1342 John de Gotham
- 1351 John Cayn
- 1353 William Hunt
- 1395 John Swyft
- ???? William Maltby
- 1431 Richard Peas
- 1440 John Ketall
- 1463 William Redeman
- 1480 William Buckley
- 1487 John Haygate
- 1507 Hugh de St Andrew
- 1528 Thomas Babbington
- 1543 John Sacheverell
- 1546 Richard Walker
- 1567 John Lowthe
- 1590 Richard Dodds
- 1607 John Savage
- 1609 Oliver Withington
- 1619 John Foxcroft
- 1663 Moses Foxcroft
- 1673 William Danvers
- 1674 John Bridges
- 1710 William Bridges
- 1746 Samuel Martin
- 1776 John Lightfoot
- 1788 John Kirkby
- 1836 John James Vaughan
- 1882 Frederick A Wodehouse
- 1915 Reginald Alfred Bidwell
- 1925 Claude Wilfred Good
- 1930 Bernard Parker Hall
- 1954 Norman Copeland, O.B.E.
- 1971 Alfred Donald Williams
- 1989 David Gorick
- 2000 Stephen Osman
- 2011 Richard Coleman

== Memorials ==
There are many memorials within the church including:

- Anne Borrow, 1799
- Thomas Borrow, 1773
- John Barrow, 1707
- Isaac Barrow, 1745
- Samuel Martin, 1775
- Gergii Loxcroete, 1619
- John Bridges, 1710
- John Foxcroft, 1662
- John St. Andrew and his wife, 1625

== See also ==
- Grade I listed buildings in Nottinghamshire
- Listed buildings in Gotham, Nottinghamshire
