= A Prospect of Derby =

Painting by an unknown artist, c. 1725

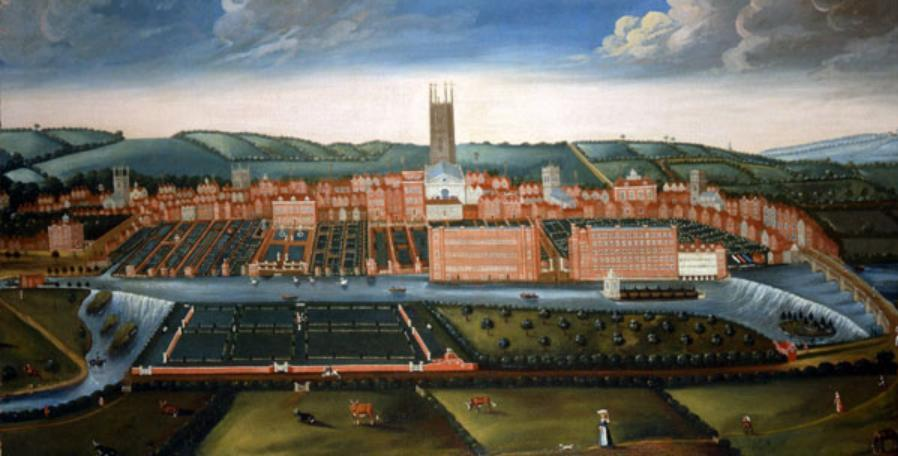
- Artist: Unknown
- Year: c. 1725
- Dimensions: 64 cm × 126 cm (25 in × 50 in)
- Location: The Museum of Making; Derby, England

A Prospect of Derby is a c. 1725 painting by an unknown artist that shows the layout of Derby in the early 18th century.

== Description ==
Derby is shown from across the River Derwent. On the left is a house called Castlefield that was home to the Borrow family. There are paintings of Isaac, Thomas and Ann Borrow in Derby Museum and Art Gallery. Left of centre is Exeter House (demolished in 1854) which, during the Jacobite rising of 1745 played host to Charles Edward Stuart when he decided to turn back with his Scottish armies and not go to London to take the crown. The large buildings to the right are mills powered by the River Derwent. Although one of the buildings is now demolished, the right-hand mill is Derby Silk Mill, now The Museum of Making, part of Derwent Valley Mills, a World Heritage Site.

The painting is displayed (in 2023) in The Museum of Making, part of Derby Museums, at the entrance to the Throwing Room.

== Provenance ==
The painting was bought by Derby Museum and Art Gallery in 2006 from a European collector via Sotheby's.
