= St Winifred's Church, Kingston on Soar =

Coordinates: 52.8448°N 1.2563°W

Church of St. Winifred
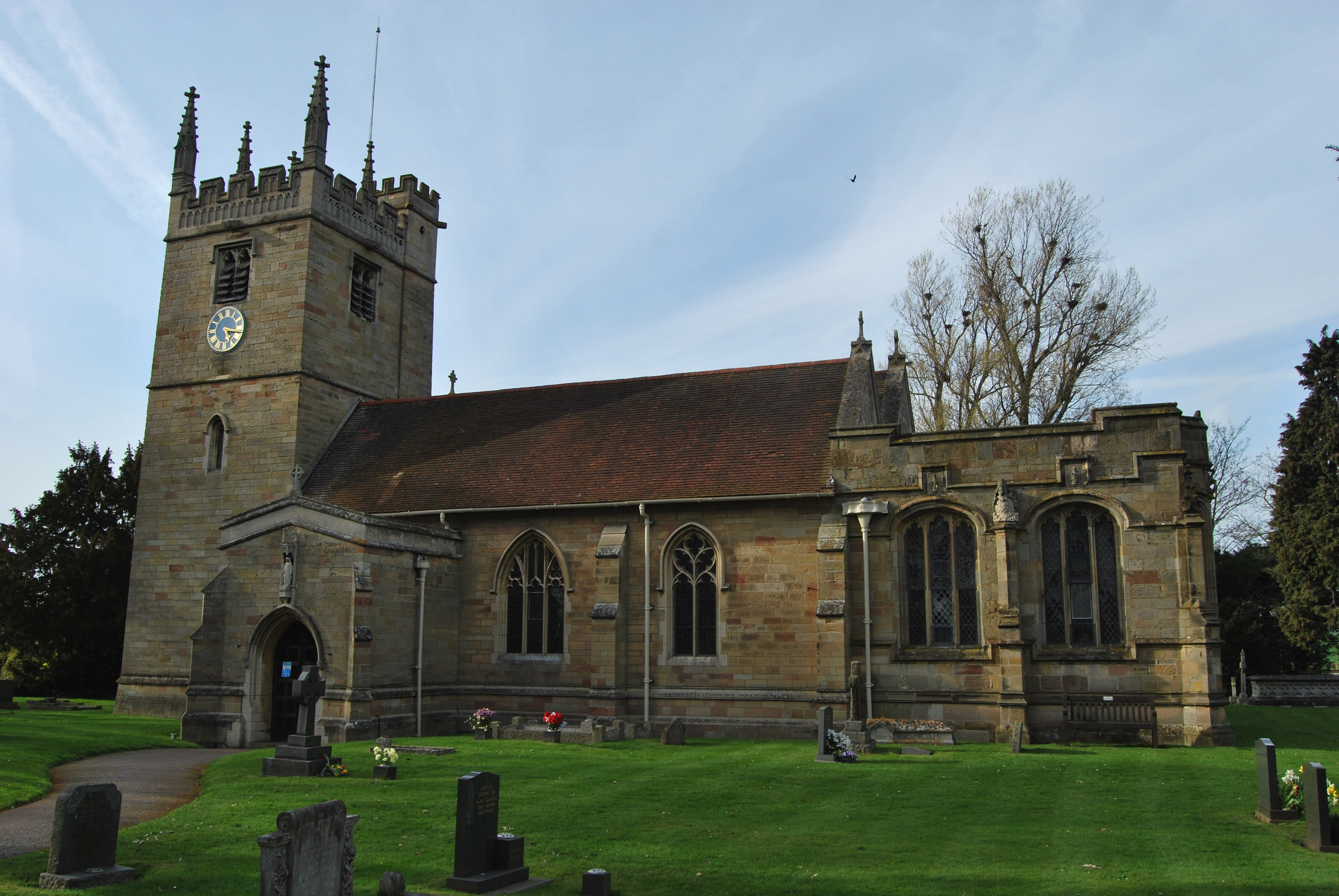
- Church of St. Winifred
- Location: Kegworth Road, Kingston on Soar
- Denomination: Church of England
- Churchmanship: Low Church / Evangelical
- Website: 453churches.com

History
- Dedication: Saint Winifred

Architecture
- Heritage designation: Grade I Listed building
- Designated: 13 Oct 1966

Administration
- Province: York
- Diocese: Southwell and Nottingham
- Archdeaconry: Nottingham
- Deanery: West Bingham
- Parish: Kingston on Soar

The Church of St. Winifred is a church in Kingston on Soar, Nottinghamshire.

It is part of an informal grouping of five churches that are known collectively as "The 453 Churches" as they straddle the A453. The other churches in the group are:

- St. Lawrence's Church, Gotham
- St. George's Church, Barton in Fabis
- Holy Trinity Church, Ratcliffe-on-Soar
- All Saints’ Church, Thrumpton

== History ==
The church is a Grade I Listed building. Major restoration took place in 1900. A plaque inside the church reads The nave, aisle and tower of this church were erected and the chancel and chancel aisle restored A.D.1900 by Henry Lord Belper in memory of his son William Strutt born Feb.8th. 1875, died Oct.5th 1898.

== Incumbents ==
Until 1538 the parish church was Ratcliffe. It had rectors while Norton Priory was patron, then vicars when Burscough became patron. At the time when Kingston became a separate parish, the last priest put forward by Burscough was vicar. The priest appointed in 1543 was under crown patronage.

- 1239 W. de Shendon
- 1270 Henry de Halton
- 1292 Richard de Hertford
- 1326 Walter de Alleford
- 1331 John Gerard
- 1342 Walter de Melburn
- ???? Robert de Treford
- 1352 John de Ditton
- 1359 Henry de Blakeburn
- ???? John de Kyneton
- 1385 Thomas de Basford
- 1391 Richard Gower
- ???? Richard Balle
- 1416 Richard de Wynwicke
- ???? John Ray
- 1419 William Hickson
- ???? William Wilms
- 1429 Hugo Beton
- ???? Richard Ives
- 1450 Laurence Whalley
- 1461 James Allerton
- 1471 John Buttiler
- 1478 John Prescot
- 1497 Henry Riding
- 1497 Hector Riding
- 1509 Thomas Wynter
- 1543 John Rolston
- 1553 Christopher Edwards
- 1650 Richard Hickman
- 1679 Robert Holmes
- 1856 Pattenson
- 1856 J.F. Bateman
- 1862 W.Rumman
- ???? W.Reynard
- 1875 Orlando Spencer Smith
- 1879 Edward Stuart Taylor
- 1882 Henry Balfour Hamilton
- 1909 Richard Owen Jones
- 1932 Charles Herbert Vincent Brown
- 1935 Harry Norman Wrigley
- 1938 Philip Harper New
- 1943 Bernard Parker Hall
- 1947 John Frederick Theodore Martin
- 1952 Cyril Brailsford
- 1954 Ieuan Merchant Williams
- 1962 John William Mayer
- 1967 Raymond Samuel Foster
- 1969 Norman Copeland
- 1971 Alfred Donald Williams
- 1981 Robert Lewis McCullough
- 1985 Waller Brian Brendan Magill
- 1996 Richard Spray
- 2002 Stephen Osman
- 2011 Richard Coleman

== Organ ==
The church has a two manual pipe organ by Wilkinsons of Kendal. It was originally installed in Holy Trinity Church, Mardale Green and installed here in 1936 when that church was demolished as part of the Haweswater Reservoir construction scheme. A specification of the organ can be found on the National Pipe Organ Register.

== Bells ==
The church has six bells, the Tenor bell weighs nine and three quarter hundredweight.

== See also ==
- Grade I listed buildings in Nottinghamshire
- Listed buildings in Kingston on Soar
