= St Radegund's Church, Maplebeck =

St Radegund’s Church, Maplebeck
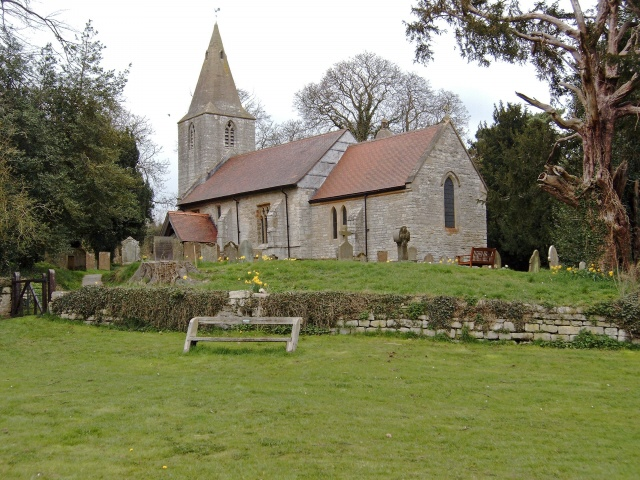
- St Radegund’s Church, Maplebeck
- St Radegund’s Church, Maplebeck
- 53°8′19.44″N 0°56′24.38″W
- Location: Maplebeck
- Country: England
- Denomination: Church of England

History
- Dedication: St Radegund

Architecture
- Heritage designation: Grade I listed

Administration
- Diocese: Diocese of Southwell and Nottingham
- Archdeaconry: Newark
- Deanery: Newark and Southwell
- Parish: Maplebeck

St Radegund's Church, Maplebeck, is a Grade I listed Church of England parish church in the Diocese of Southwell and Nottingham in Maplebeck.

== History ==
The church dates from the 13th century, and was restored in 1898 by Charles Hodgson Fowler.

The vicarage was built in 1849 to the designs of Thomas Chambers Hine funded by Henry Pelham-Clinton, 4th Duke of Newcastle.

== See also ==
- Grade I listed buildings in Nottinghamshire
- Listed buildings in Maplebeck
