= Thomas Borrow and Ann Borrow =

Two paintings by Joseph Wright of Derby

Thomas Borrow
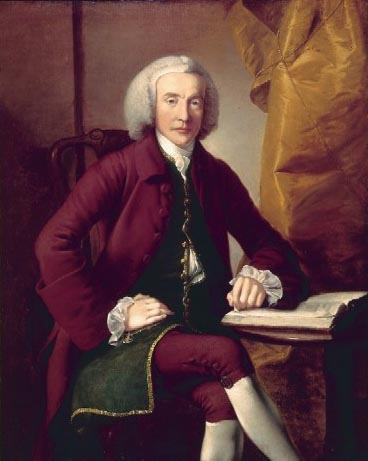
- Artist: Joseph Wright of Derby
- Year: 1762–1763
- Dimensions: 127 cm × 101.6 cm (50 in × 40.0 in)
- Location: Derby Museum and Art Gallery; Derby

Anne Borrow
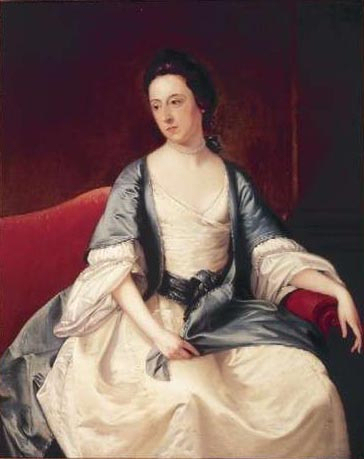
- Artist: Joseph Wright of Derby
- Year: 1762–1763
- Dimensions: 127 cm × 101.6 cm (50 in × 40.0 in)
- Location: Derby Museum and Art Gallery

Thomas Borrow and Ann Borrow are two paintings by Joseph Wright of Derby from 1762 to 1763.

== Description ==
Thomas Borrow was the eldest son to Isaac and Honor Borrow and was born on 3 June 1709. His father who resided at Castlefield, a very large country house, was twice Mayor of Derby in 1730 and 1742. There is a painting of Isaac Borrow extant and the Borrow house is included in a 1725 painting called A Prospect of Derby.

Borrow entered Grays Inn in 1727. In the year after Bonnie Prince Charlie came to Derby, Borrow was made the Town Clerk in 1746.

In 1757 he married Anne Ault of Loughborough and came into the use of £4,000 and lands and property in Litchurch and the parish of St Peters. St Peters parish is now in the centre of Derby. Joseph Wright of Derby painted Borrow and his wife, Anne (or Ann). Both of these paintings are in the collection of Derby Museum and Art Gallery as is an anonymous painting of their house called Castlefields. The paintings both date from 1762 to 1763 and are 40 by 50 inches in size.

Borrow died on 6 August 1786. They had one son name Thomas who spelt his surname Borough and a daughter Anne Honor who died aged twelve. The parents and daughter are buried in St Lawrence Church in Gotham where there is a memorial on the south wall.
