= Listed buildings in Barton in Fabis =

Barton in Fabis is a civil parish in the Rushcliffe district of Nottinghamshire, England. The parish contains seven listed buildings that are recorded in the National Heritage List for England. Of these, one is listed at Grade I, the highest of the three grades, and the others are at Grade II, the lowest grade. The parish contains the village of Barton in Fabis and the surrounding countryside. All the listed buildings are in the village, and consist of a church and associated structures, including a war memorial, a rectory, an octagonal dovecote, and two houses.

== Key ==
Grade	Criteria
I	Buildings of exceptional interest, sometimes considered to be internationally important
II	Buildings of national importance and special interest

== Buildings ==
Name and location	Photograph	Date	Notes	Grade
St George's Church; 52.88979°N 1.22499°W		14th century	The church has been altered and extended through the centuries, including restorations in 1877 by Thomas Chambers Hine and in 1885 by C. M. Oldrid Scott. The church is built in stone with slate roofs, and consists of a nave with a clerestory, a south aisle with a chapel, a south porch, a chancel and a west steeple. The steeple has a tower with a single stage, angle buttresses, a circular embattled stair turret on the northeast, a west doorway, two-light bell openings, an embattled parapet, and a recessed spire. The south porch dates from 1693, and has clasping pilaster buttresses with capitals carrying an entablature and a parapet. The entrance is arched, with imposts, panelled spandrels, and an initialled and dated keystone.	I
20 Brown Lane; 52.89074°N 1.22453°W		Mid 17th century	A timber framed house, later encased in red brick, with a tile roof. There is a single storey and attics, and four bays. One window has a fixed light, there are two horizontally-sliding sash windows, and the other windows are casements.	II
27 Rectory Place; 52.88982°N 1.22660°W	—	17th century	The house, which was later extended, is in red brick, with string courses raised over the windows, and a pantile roof with brick coped gables and kneelers. There are two storeys and an L-shaped plan. The windows are a mix of sashes, most of which are horizontally-sliding, and casements.	II
The Rectory; 52.88951°N 1.22540°W		Late 17th century	The rectory, which has been altered and extended, is in red brick with some stone, and has a tile roof, hipped to the right. There are two storeys and an irregular plan, with a garden front of six bays, and an east front of three bays. The garden front contains a doorway with a trellis porch, a bay window, and other windows that are a mix of sashes and casements.	II
Dovecote, Manor Farm; 52.88888°N 1.22305°W	—	1677	The dovecote is in red brick with stone dressings, bands, and a pyramidal tile roof with a wood and tile glover. There is an octagonal plan, one storey and a loft. The doorway has a quoined surround, and there is a fixed-light window. Inside, there is a cobbled floor and plaster nesting boxes.	II
Wall, gate and overthrow, St George's Church; 52.88958°N 1.22508°W		Late 19th century	The churchyard is enclosed by a stone wall with shaped coping about 1 metre (3 ft 3 in) high. It contains a double wooden gate dating from 1937, and an iron overthrow, with an iron and glass lamp, dating from 1917.	II
War memorial 52.88969°N 1.22493°W		c. 1920	The war memorial is in the churchyard of St George's Church, adjacent to the south door of the church. It is in granite and consists of a slender cross with an octagonal shaft and a stylised relief carving of a four-petal flower at the junction of the arms. The cross has a bell-shaped base and stands on an octagonal plinth. On the plinth are inscriptions and the names of those lost in the two World Wars.	II
