= Kingston on Soar =

Village in Nottinghamshire, England

Coordinates: 52.844°N 1.256°W

- Village and civil parish
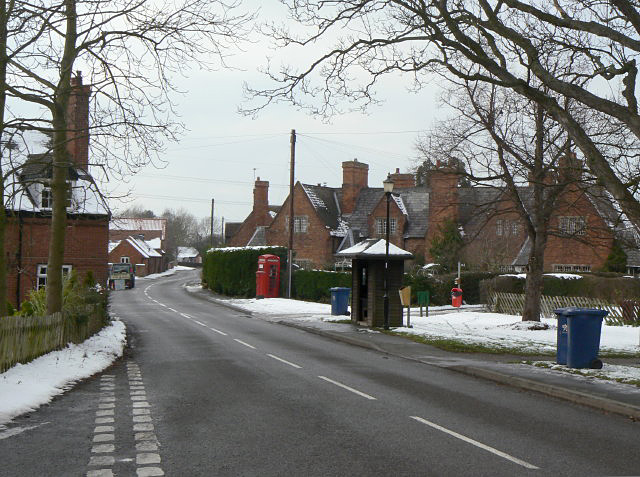
- Kegworth Road in Kingston on Soar

- Location within Nottinghamshire
- Interactive map of Kingston on Soar
- Area: 2 sq mi (5.2 km^{2})
- Population: 301 (2021)
  - Density: 151/sq mi (58/km^{2})
- OS grid reference: SK 501276
  - London: 105 mi (169 km) SSE
- District: Rushcliffe
- Shire county: Nottinghamshire
- Region: East Midlands
- Country: England
- Sovereign state: United Kingdom
- Settlements: Kingston on Soar; Kingston Hall; New Kingston
- Post town: NOTTINGHAM
- Postcode district: NG11
- Dialling code: 01509
- Police: Nottinghamshire
- Fire: Nottinghamshire
- Ambulance: East Midlands
- UK Parliament: Rushcliffe
- Website: www.kingstononsoar.org.uk

Kingston on Soar is a village and civil parish in the Rushcliffe borough of Nottinghamshire, England.

== Description ==
=== Setting ===
Kingston on Soar predominantly lies within the Trent Washlands character area, and partially in the Nottinghamshire Wolds character area.

White's Directory of Nottinghamshire, written in 1853, describes Kingston on Soar as such:

Kingston-Upon-Soar is a small village and parish 10 miles south west by south of Nottingham, betwixt the Wolds and the Leicestershire border.

John Throsby, writing during 1790 in his new edition of Robert Thoroton's Antiquities of Nottinghamshire, describes Kingston on Soar such:

This Lordship contains 1100 acres of old inclosed land, divided into 3 farms, exclusive of some patches of home ground, attached to some inferior dwellings: It belongs chiefly to the Duke of Leeds, who is lord of the manor. [...] The village contains about 30 dwellings.

=== Local geography ===
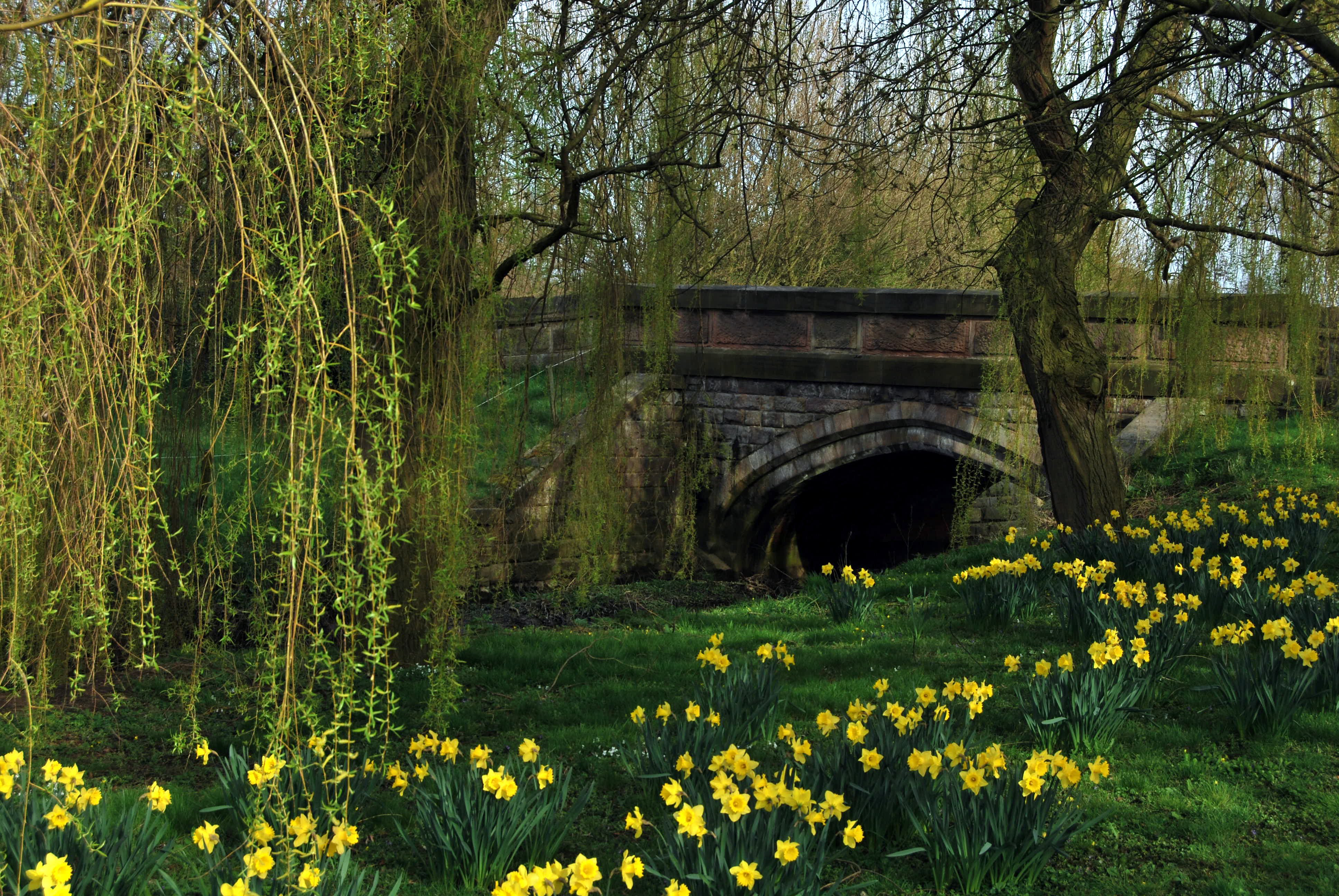
Kingston on Soar Spring Brook

The River Soar does not pass through the village, but very close by to the west. At this point the Soar, flowing south to north, forms the border with Leicestershire. The Kingston Brook drains west through the village. Nearby places are Kegworth in Leicestershire, New Kingston in Nottinghamshire and, further downstream, Ratcliffe on Soar. John Throsby, writing during 1790 in his new edition of Robert Thoroton's Antiquities of Nottinghamshire, describes Kingston on Soar's geography such:

The soil in the upper part of the lordship is clayey; but towards the Soar it is of a light sand, and appears good grazing ground.

=== Population ===
The 2011 census records the population of Kingston on Soar as 296, increasing marginally to 301 at the 2021 census.

The parish has three centres of population: the core village, Kingston Hall and New Kingston (which covers West Leake Lane, Kingston Fields and Kingston Court).

The table below displays the historic number of households, families and people living in Kingston on Soar:

Year	Households/families	Total Population	Male Population	Female Population
1086	15	-	-	-
1674	14	-	-	-
1790	c. 30	-	-	-
1801	-	152	69	83
1811	-	155	74	81
1821	-	166	92	74
1831	30	175	89	86
1841	33	181	94	87
1851	35	196	104	92
1861	39	197	-	-
1871	43	210	98	112
1881	43	196	95	101
1891	49	281	139	142
1901	50	271	124	147
1911	50	265	121	144
1921	51	251	117	134
1931	59	232	108	124
1951	77	256	118	138
1961	88	257	128	129
1971	75	220	-	-
1991	91	223	116	107
2001	103	239	120	119
2011	119	296	158	138
2021	124	301	155	146

== Toponymy ==
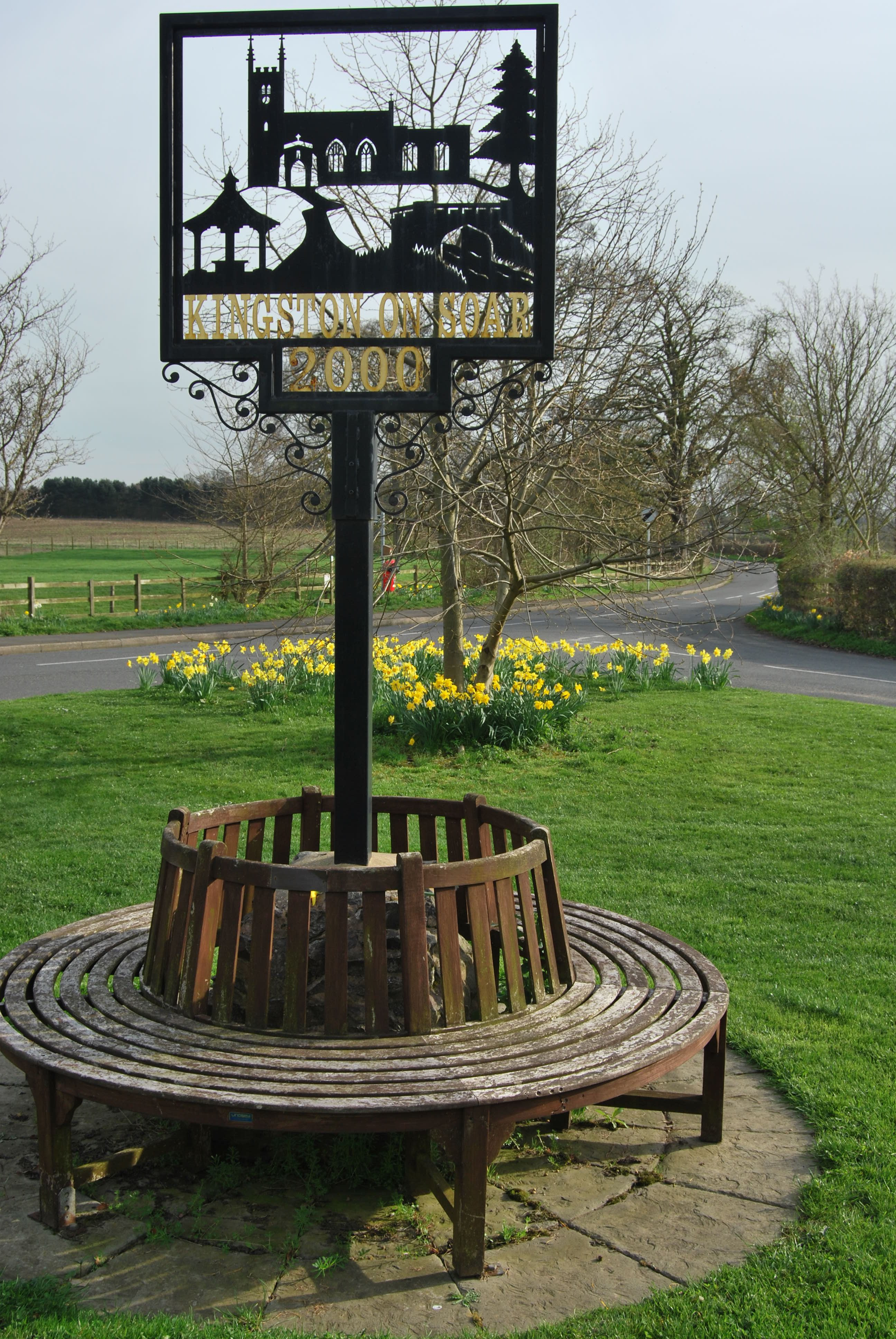
Kingston on Soar sign on village green

Domesday Book, written in 1086, records the village's place name as 'Chinestan'. Robert Thoroton writing in his book The Antiquities of Nottinghamshire first published in 1677, later published with additions by John Throsby in 1790, states:

In Doomsday-Book written Cheniston: So called, probably, from some Owner, as most Towns of that Termination, in this County, generally are.

The book The Place-Names of Nottinghamshire differs from Robert Thoroton stating that the origin of the name means 'royal stone'. The name derives from the Old English words 'cyne', meaning royal or kingly, and 'stan', meaning stone or rock. In Old English the word 'cyne' could refer to a local chief and does not necessarily refer to a ruler of a larger dominion. The '-on-soar' originates from the village's location near the River Soar.

== Heritage ==
=== Listed buildings ===
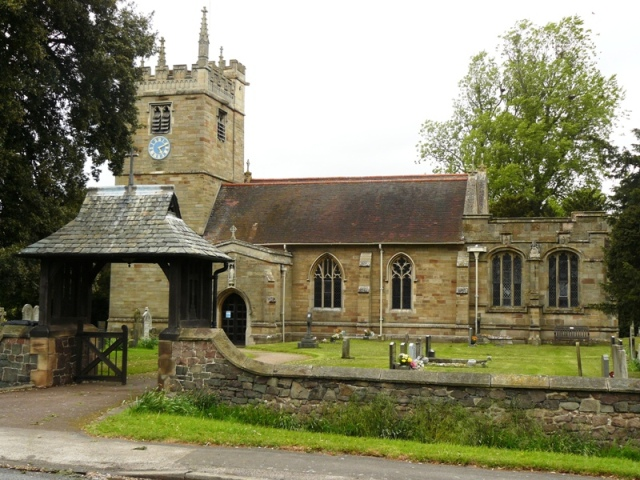
The St Winifred's Church (Grade I) and the Lychgate (Grade II).

Kingston on Soar has a Grade I listed church along with 18 other listed structures in the parish, all Grade II listed.

==== St Winifred's Church (Grade I) ====
St Winifred's church dates back to c. 1540, when the chancel was built under the Babington family of Dethick. Before, when Kingston on Soar belonged to the parish of Ratcliffe on Soar, a chapel-of-ease existed dating back to the late 11th or early 12th century. The church was largely rebuilt in 1900 by R Creed. The tomb of the 1st Baron Belper is located in the churchyard.

Simon Jenkins listed St Winifred's in his book, England's Thousand Best Churches.

==== Kingston Hall (Grade II) ====
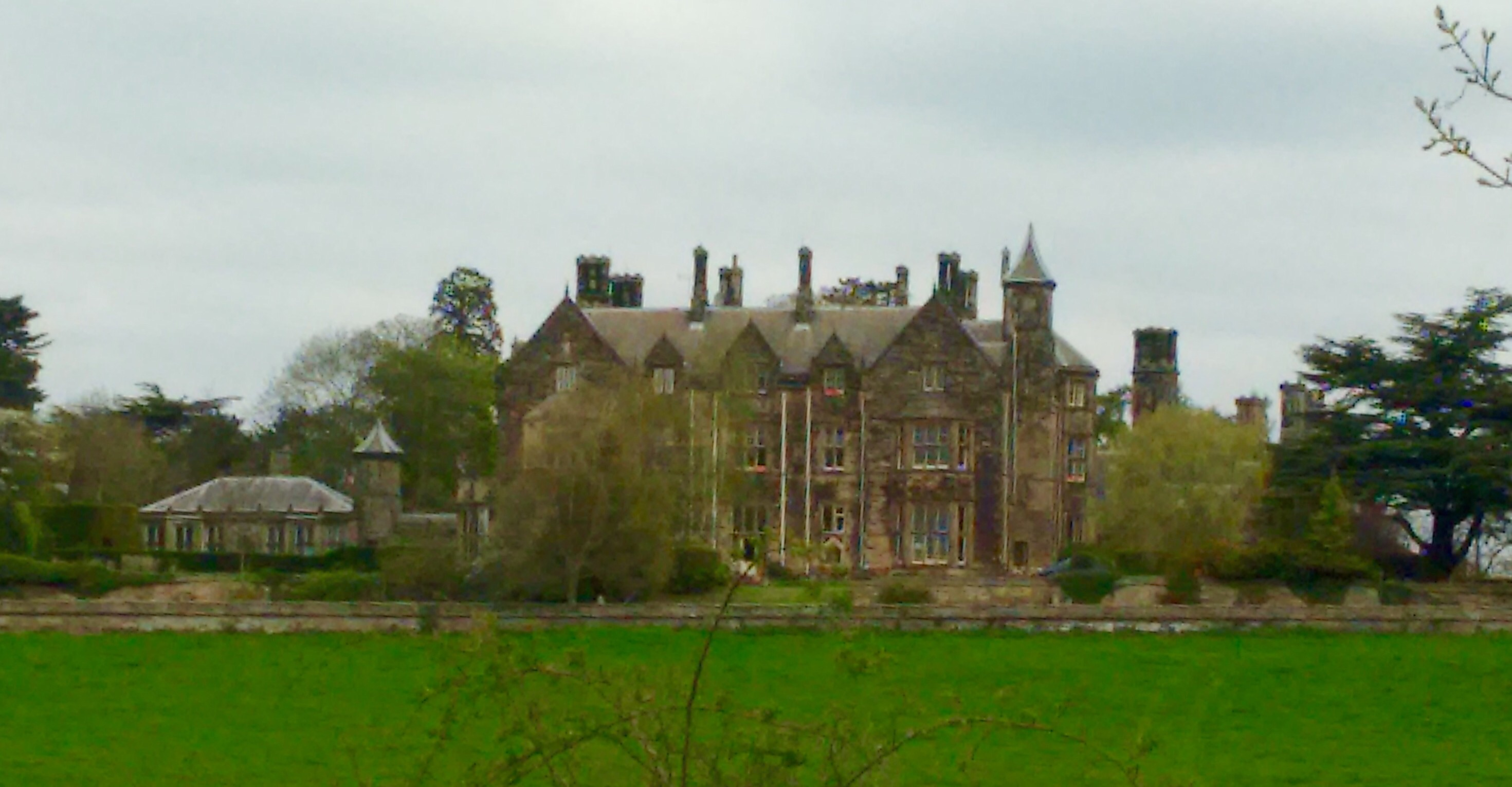
Kingston Hall (Grade II).

Kingston Hall, which is a large Grade II listed country house, was built 1842-46 for Mr Edward Strutt, who would later become the 1st Lord Belper. The hall was built by the architect Edward Blore who had previously worked on Buckingham Palace. Ronald Strutt, the 4th Lord Belper, sold the hall in 1976. In 1980 the hall was converted into 12 individual dwellings and the surrounding buildings were sold for separate occupation.

The grounds of Kingston Hall contain three Grade II listed structures: a garden pavilion, a stable block and a lodge with an attached gateway.

Kingston Park Pleasure Gardens, which surrounds Kingston Hall, is also Grade II listed.

==== Other listed buildings ====
As well as St Winifred's Church (Grade I) and Kingston Hall (Grade II), there are 17 other listed structures in Kingston on Soar, all Grade II listed: 1, 3, 5 and 7, the Green; 9, 11, 15, 17 and 19, the Green; 21, 23, 25 and 27, the Green; Church Farmhouse; K6 Telephone Kiosk; Kegworth Bridge; Kegworth Shallow Lock; Kingston Fields Farmhouse and Workshops; Lodge and Attached Gateway; Lychgate at Entrance to Churchyard of Church of St Winifred; Manor Farmhouse; Pavilion in the Garden of Kingston Hall; Pumphouse; Stable Block at Kingston Hall; Stables at Manor Farm; The Old Schoolhouse and The Post Office.

=== Other heritage ===
==== Agricultural college ====
The precursor to the Midland Agricultural and Dairy College (which became the University of Nottingham's Sutton Bonington Campus in the neighbouring parish of Sutton Bonington) was the Midland Dairy Institute and was located in the parish of Kingston on Soar. Stilton cheese was made along with other types at the Institute. The University Farm, a 445 hectares (1,100 acres) commercial research farm, partly lies in the parish, including an associated high-technology dairy centre.

=== Notable people ===
John Berridge (1717–93) was born into a Kingston on Soar farming family but soon realised he had little talent for the land. He entered Cambridge University and then the ministry of the Church of England. In this he was at first totally inept, but in 1757 experienced a religious conversion while reading the Bible and became a great preacher at Everton in Bedfordshire. His visitors included John Wesley and Selina, Countess of Huntingdon. His sermons were often met with 'strange convulsions' in the congregation, and people falling down as if dead, described in detail in Wesley's journals in 1758-9. Berridge's tomb at Everton is famous for its evangelistic inscription. His funeral was conducted by Charles Simeon.

== Local government and elections ==
=== Parliamentary elections ===
The village is part of the Rushcliffe constituency in the House of Commons, currently represented by James Naish of the Labour Party. The constituency was notable for being represented by Kenneth Clarke, former Chancellor of the Exchequer, from 1970 until 2019.

=== Local government ===
==== County council ====
For Nottinghamshire County Council elections the parish comes within the Leake & Ruddington electoral ward, which has two council seats. The most recent election was in May 2025, when Andy Brown (Conservative) and Stuart Matthews (Reform UK) were elected.

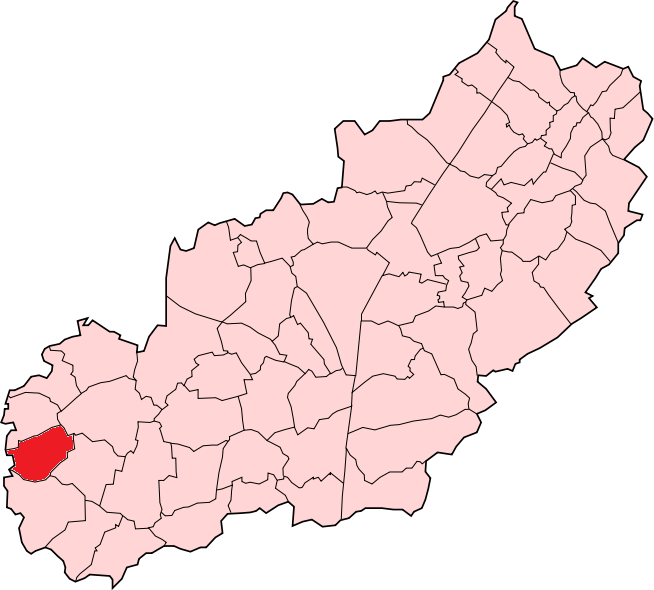
The parish of Kingston on Soar within the Rushcliffe Borough.

==== Borough council ====
For the election of a councillor to Rushcliffe Borough Council, the parish forms part of the Gotham ward, which elects two councillors. The most recent election was on 4 May 2023, in which Rex Walker and Andy Brown of the Conservatives were elected.

==== Parish council ====
The parish council has 7 seats. Council meetings usually take place on the first Tuesday every two months.

=== Historic ===
The parish fell within the ancient Rushcliffe wapentake of Nottinghamshire. Before 1894 the parish was part of the Shardlow sanitary district, along with other nearby villages such as Ratcliffe on Soar and Kegworth. Between 1837 and 1930 the parish was also part of the Shardlow poor law union and registration district. From 1927 the parish was part of the Leake Rural District, until its abolition in 1935, when the parish was then transferred to the Basford Rural District. In April 1974 the Basford Rural District was abolished and the non-metropolitan district of Rushcliffe was created, which Kingston on Soar became part of.

== Amenities ==
=== Transport ===
There is no railway station in the village, however East Midlands Parkway opened in January 2009 at nearby Ratcliffe on Soar providing links on the Midland Main Line with journeys to London St Pancras taking approximately 90 minutes.

The Soar Valley Bus routes 1-7 serve the village, including a regular service to East Leake Academy during school term time, a weekly service to Loughborough on Thursday (market day), a weekly service to East Leake on Tuesday and a service every Friday to either Long Eaton Asda or West Bridford Asda. The Nottinghamshire 865 bus also serves the village providing a regular service to Clifton NET Park & Ride between Monday to Saturday.

=== Other facilities ===
The Village Hall, built in 1935, is located near the centre of the village on The Green.

Kingston on Soar has one postbox, located on The Green.

== Gallery ==
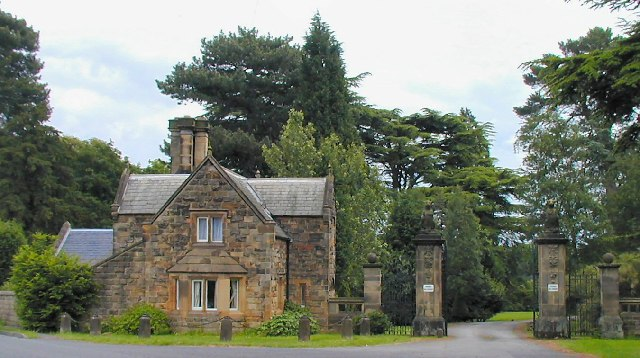
Kingston Hall lodge with attached gateway (Grade II).

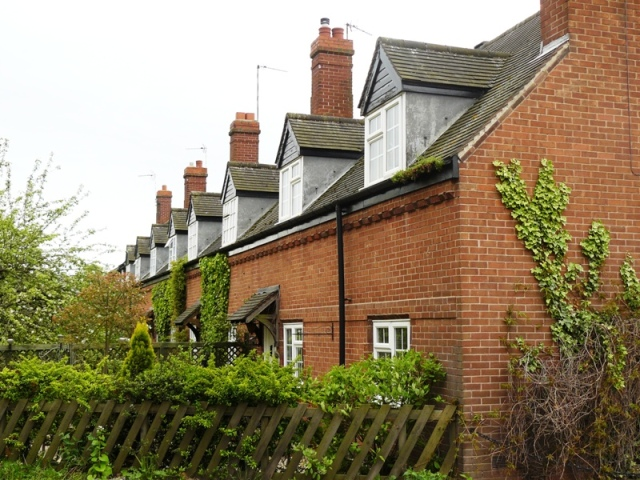
Houses on The Green (Grade II).

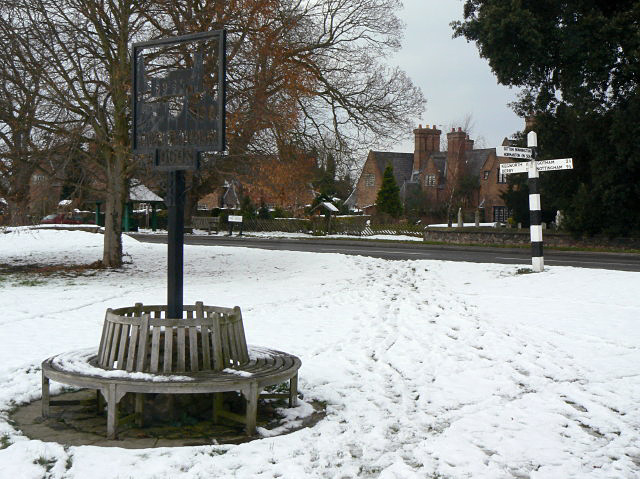
The Green covered with snow.

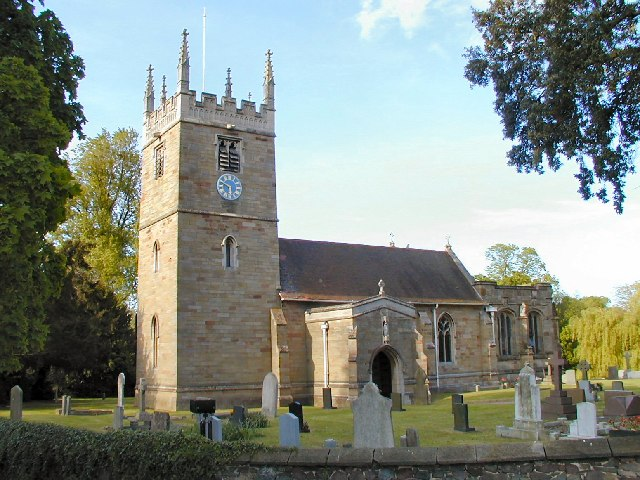
St Winifred's Church (Grade I).

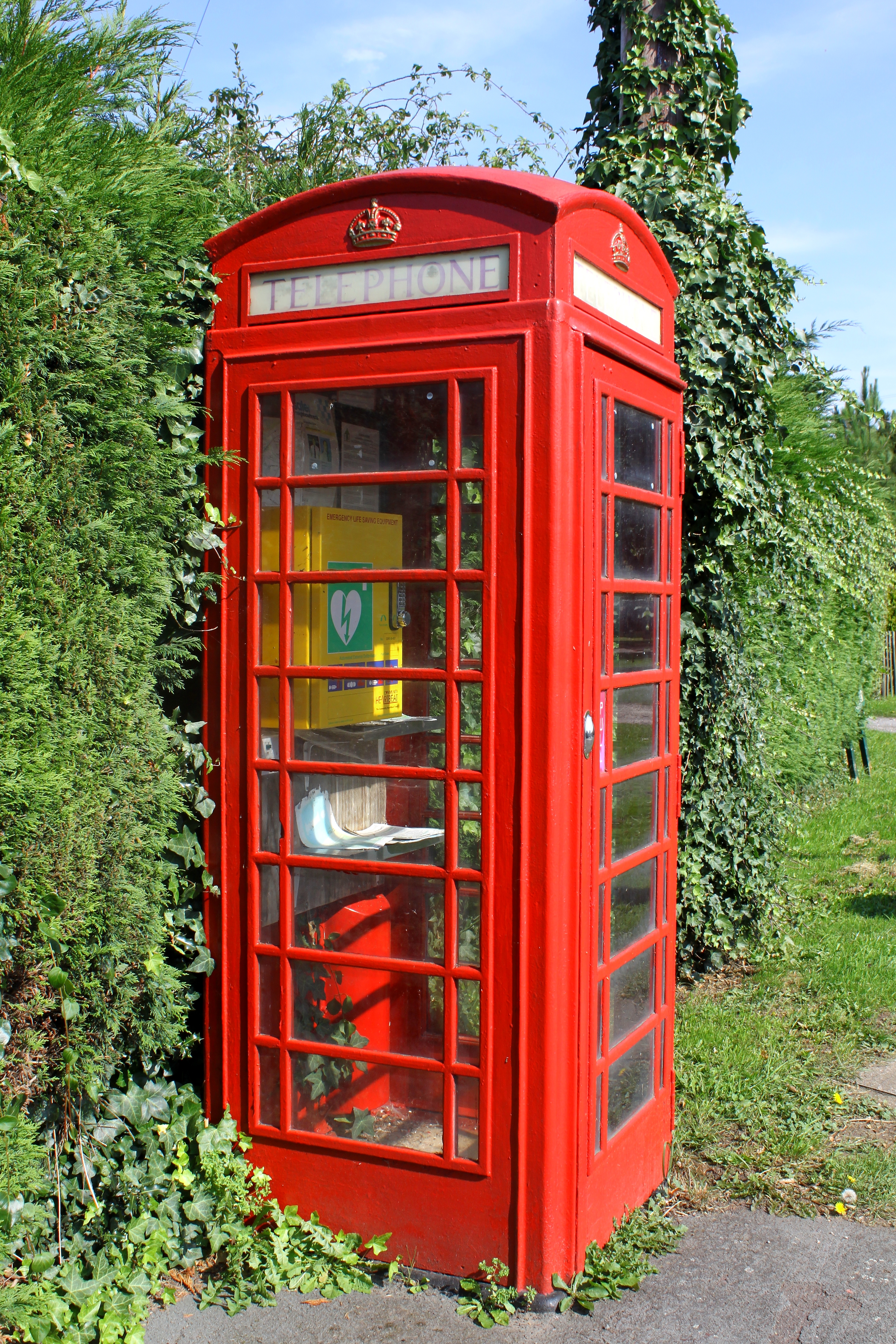
K6 Telephone Kiosk on Kegworth Road (Grade II).

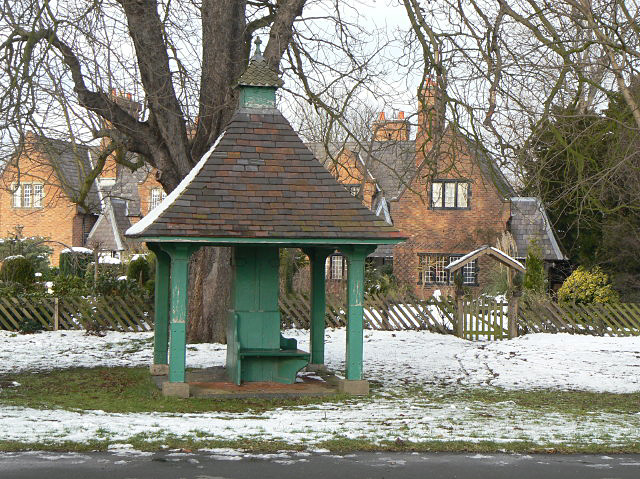
Village Pump (Grade II).

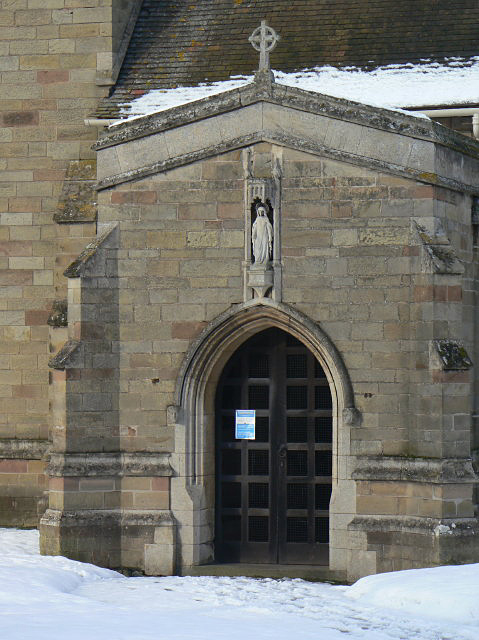
South Porch of St Winifred's Church (Grade I).
