= Maplebeck =

Village and civil parish in Nottinghamshire, England

Coordinates: 53.14°N 0.94°W

- Village and civil parish
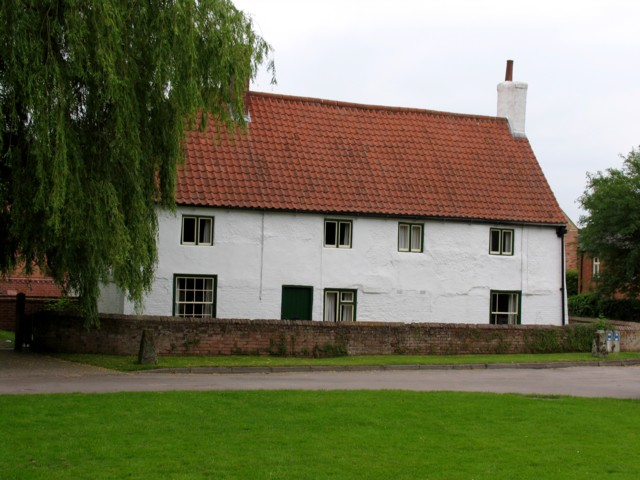
- Cottage by the green

- Location within Nottinghamshire
- Interactive map of Maplebeck
- Area: 1.87 sq mi (4.8 km^{2})
- Population: 106 (2021)
  - Density: 57/sq mi (22/km^{2})
- OS grid reference: SK 710607
  - London: 115 mi (185 km) SSE
- District: Newark and Sherwood
- Shire county: Nottinghamshire
- Region: East Midlands
- Country: England
- Sovereign state: United Kingdom
- Post town: NEWARK
- Postcode district: NG22
- Dialling code: 01636
- Police: Nottinghamshire
- Fire: Nottinghamshire
- Ambulance: East Midlands
- UK Parliament: Newark

Maplebeck is a village and civil parish in Nottinghamshire, England and located 6 miles north of the town of Southwell. It is surrounded by the villages and parishes of Caunton, Eakring, Kneesall, Kersall and Winkburn. It is one of only five villages in England to have a church dedicated to St Radegund and it is also one of only 51 Thankful Villages in England and Wales – those rare places that were spared fatalities in the Great War of 1914 to 1918. The village was featured on Darren Hayman's album, Thankful Villages Volume 2. The parish church of St Radegund was extensively restored in 1898. 106 residents were reported at the 2021 census.

== Notable buildings ==
- Low Farmhouse, Church Lane 17th century
- Maplebeck House, Main Street Early 19th century
- Maplebeck Farmhouse, Main Street 1729
- St Radegund's Church, Maplebeck 13th century onwards
- Old Vicarage, architect Thomas Chambers Hine 1849
- Primitive Methodist Chapel 1868
- Village Hall, architect Marsh Grochowski 2015
