= Ratcliffe-on-Soar =

Village and civil parish in Nottinghamshire, England

Coordinates: 52.854°N 1.264°W

- Village and civil parish
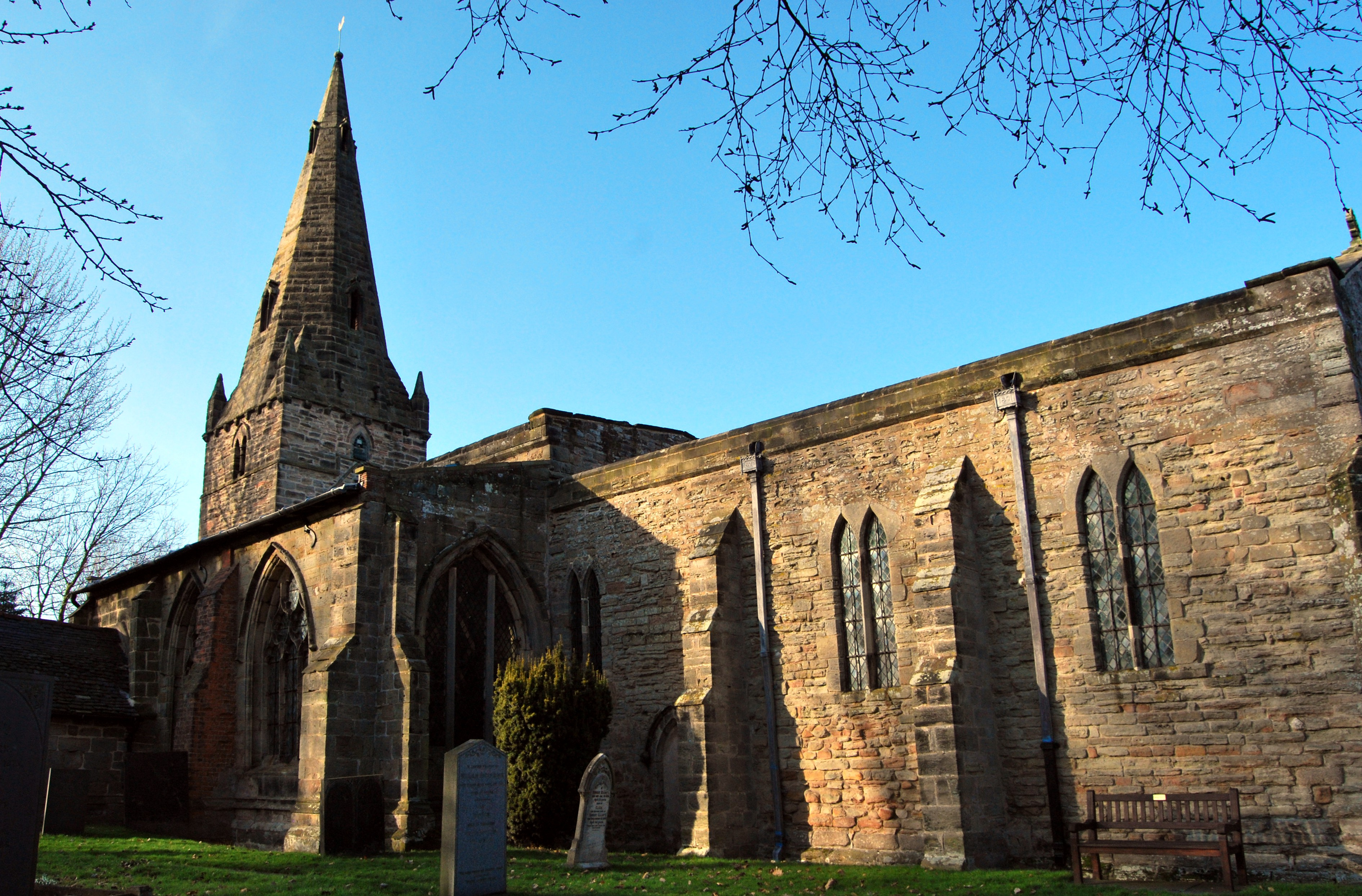
- Holy Trinity Church, Ratcliffe-on-Soar

- Location within Nottinghamshire
- Interactive map of Ratcliffe-on-Soar
- Area: 1.77 sq mi (4.6 km^{2})
- Population: 147 (2021)
  - Density: 83/sq mi (32/km^{2})
- OS grid reference: SK 495295
  - London: 105 mi (169 km) SSE
- District: Rushcliffe
- Shire county: Nottinghamshire
- Region: East Midlands
- Country: England
- Sovereign state: United Kingdom
- Post town: NOTTINGHAM
- Postcode district: NG11
- Dialling code: 01509
- Police: Nottinghamshire
- Fire: Nottinghamshire
- Ambulance: East Midlands
- UK Parliament: Rushcliffe

Ratcliffe-on-Soar, sometimes written Ratcliffe-upon-Soar or Radcliffe-on-Soar, is a village and civil parish in Nottinghamshire on the River Soar.

== Geography ==
It is part of the Rushcliffe district, and is the site of Ratcliffe-on-Soar Power Station. Nearby places are Kingston on Soar, Kegworth and Trentlock. With a population measured at 141 in the 2011 Census, and marginally increasing to 147 residents at the 2021 census, the parish is too small to have a parish council and so has a parish meeting. Although the village does not contain any shops, it has a church and a marina which is often affected by severe flooding as it built on designated floodplain, just before the Soar joins the River Trent at Trentlock.

== History ==
Mesolithic scrapers and Neolithic flints have been found in Ratcliffe-on-Soar.

Ratcliffe is one of three nearby settlements whose name preserves the Brittonic word for "ramparts" (cf. Gaelic rath), along with Ratby and the Roman ruins at Leicester, known as Ratae Corieltauvorum.

Evidence of a Roman villa and other structures has been found in the village, as well as Roman pottery.

In the Domesday Book of 1086 the village is listed as Radeclive. It's also thought the name comes from references to the red clay along the cliffs of the Soar.

The area was a filming location for the 2010 movie Skeletons.

== Economy ==
Ratcliffe-on-Soar Power Station was the last coal power plant in the UK, closing on 30 September 2024.

== Transport ==
The Midland Main Line runs by the village, which is served by the East Midlands Parkway railway station. A shuttle bus service runs from the railway station to East Midlands Airport.

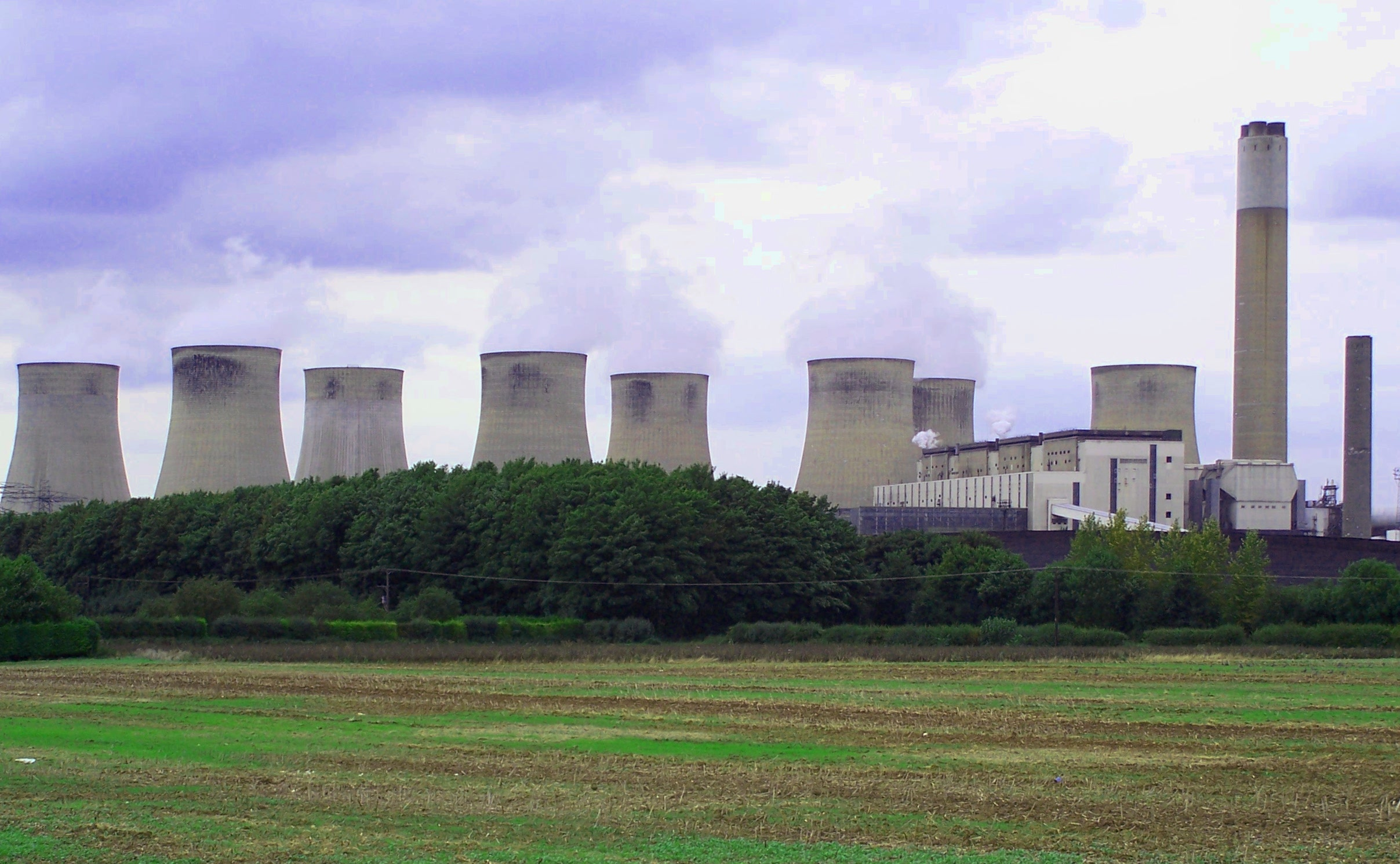
Ratcliffe-on-Soar Power Station

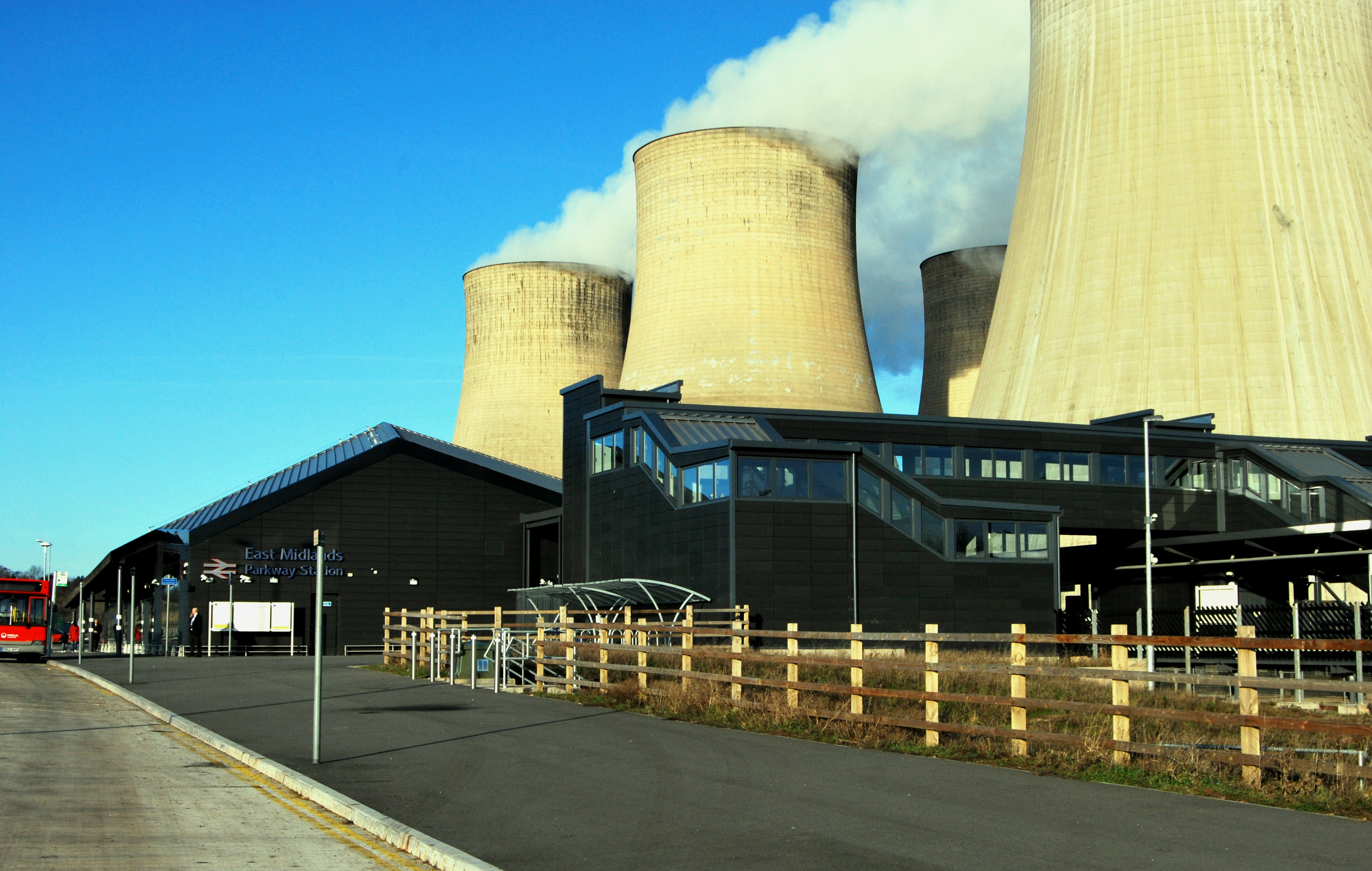
East Midlands Parkway railway station

== See also ==
- Listed buildings in Ratcliffe-on-Soar
