= Barton in Fabis =

Village and civil parish in Nottinghamshire, England

Coordinates: 52.890°N 1.223°W

- Village and civil parish
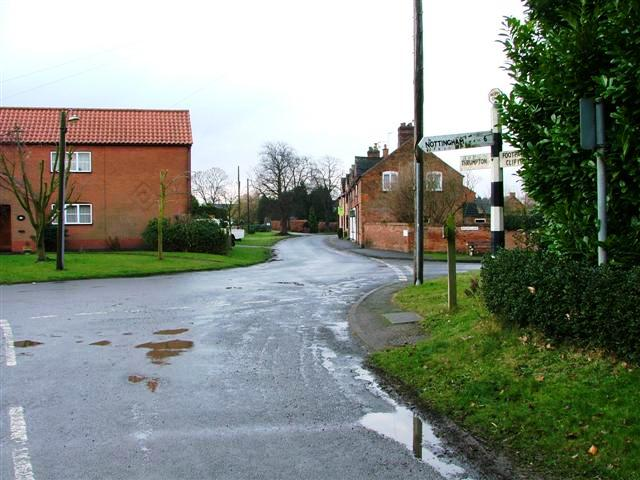
- Barton in Fabis

- Location within Nottinghamshire
- Interactive map of Barton in Fabis
- Area: 3.03 sq mi (7.8 km^{2})
- Population: 258 (2021)
  - Density: 85/sq mi (33/km^{2})
- OS grid reference: SK 5232
  - London: 105 mi (169 km) SSE
- District: Rushcliffe
- Shire county: Nottinghamshire
- Region: East Midlands
- Country: England
- Sovereign state: United Kingdom
- Post town: NOTTINGHAM
- Postcode district: NG11
- Dialling code: 0115
- Police: Nottinghamshire
- Fire: Nottinghamshire
- Ambulance: East Midlands
- UK Parliament: Rushcliffe
- Website: bartoninfabispc.org.uk

Barton in Fabis is a village and civil parish in the Rushcliffe district of Nottinghamshire. It had a population of 266 in the 2011 census, falling slightly to 258 at the 2021 census. The village is just south of Nottingham, being on the other side of the River Trent from Attenborough.

A ferry, Barton Ferry, used to cross the River Trent to the Attenborough side near to the mouth of the River Erewash. A ferry crossed the River Trent at this point since before 1774. The Fairham Brook forms part of the eastern parish boundary.

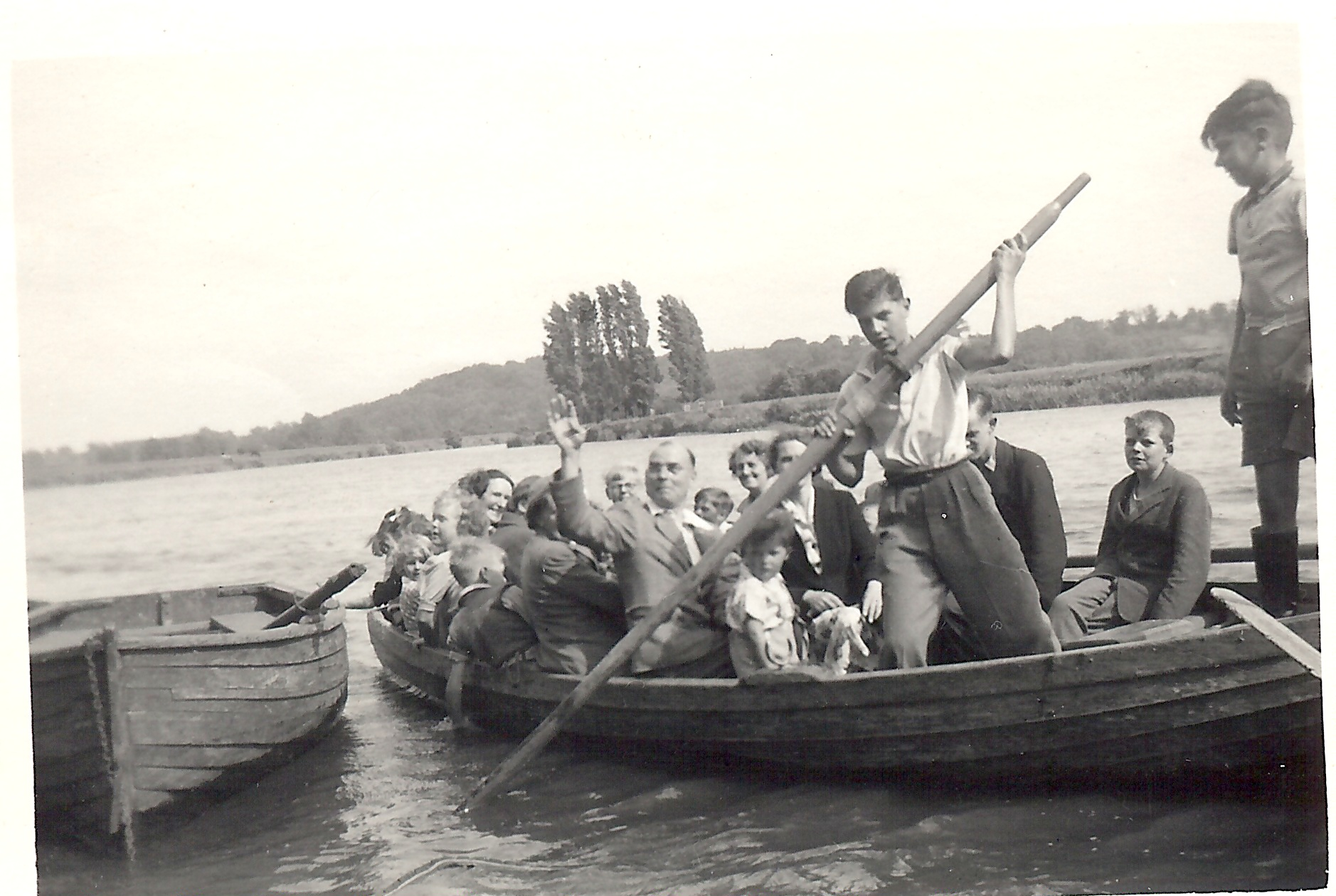
A Ferry near to Barton in Fabis in 1949

The name originates from an older name, "Barton in the Beans" (Fabis being Latin for 'bean', in the ablative plural), apparently referring to the beans grown in the village. This name was also used for a Leicestershire village, Barton in the Beans, which has retained its name.

A proposal to split the civil parish into two would be unanimously voted for by the Rushcliffe Borough Council on 5 March 2026 after residents were consulted on 7 June 2025, with 97% of respondents agreeing. The new civil parish to the east is for Fairham, a new suburb to the south of Clifton.

== See also ==
- Listed buildings in Barton in Fabis
