= Rushcliffe Borough Council elections =

Council in Nottinghamshire, England

Rushcliffe Borough Council elections are held every four years. Rushcliffe Borough Council is the local authority for the non-metropolitan district of Rushcliffe in Nottinghamshire, England. Since the last boundary changes in 2023 the council has comprised 44 councillors representing 24 wards, with each ward electing one, two or three councillors.

== Council elections ==
- 1973 Rushcliffe Borough Council election
- 1976 Rushcliffe Borough Council election (New ward boundaries)
- 1979 Rushcliffe Borough Council election
- 1983 Rushcliffe Borough Council election
- 1987 Rushcliffe Borough Council election (Borough boundary changes took place but the number of seats remained the same)
- 1991 Rushcliffe Borough Council election (Borough boundary changes took place but the number of seats remained the same)
- 1995 Rushcliffe Borough Council election
- 1999 Rushcliffe Borough Council election
- 2003 Rushcliffe Borough Council election (New ward boundaries reduced the number of seats by four)
- 2007 Rushcliffe Borough Council election
- 2011 Rushcliffe Borough Council election
- 2015 Rushcliffe Borough Council election (New ward boundaries)
- 2019 Rushcliffe Borough Council election
- 2023 Rushcliffe Borough Council election (New ward boundaries)

== Results maps ==
2003 results map

2007 results map

2011 results map

2015 results map

2019 results map

2023 results map

== By-election results ==
=== 1995-1999 ===
Ash Lea By-Election 3 July 1997
Party	Candidate	Votes	%	±%
Labour		498	79.3	−3.6
Conservative		96	15.3	−1.8
Liberal Democrats		34	5.4	+5.4
Majority		402	64.0	
Turnout		628	14.8	
Labour hold		Swing		

=== 1999-2003 ===
Malkin By-Election 4 May 2000
Party	Candidate	Votes	%	±%
Conservative		608	61.4	+3.3
Labour		307	31.0	−10.9
Liberal Democrats		76	7.7	+7.7
Majority		301	30.4	
Turnout		991	38.5	
Conservative hold		Swing		

Bingham By-Election 31 August 2000
Party	Candidate	Votes	%	±%
Liberal Democrats	Sue Hull	638	47.6	
Conservative	Jacqueline Marshall	519	38.7	
Labour	Jennifer Mitchell	184	13.7	
Majority		119	11.1	
Turnout		1,341	21.8	
Liberal Democrats gain from Conservative		Swing		

=== 2003-2007 ===
Wiverton By-Election 9 September 2004
Party	Candidate	Votes	%	±%
Conservative	Gordon Moore	466	49.2	+9.1
Liberal Democrats	Susan Hull	375	39.6	+39.6
Labour	William Stephens	107	11.3	+0.7
Majority		91	9.6	
Turnout		948	31.8	
Conservative hold		Swing		

Cranmer By-Election 5 May 2005
Party	Candidate	Votes	%	±%
Conservative	Jacqueline Marshall	614	58.1	−22.1
Labour	Allen Ashmore	240	22.7	+3.7
Liberal Democrats	Sheila Gauld	202	19.1	+19.1
Majority		374	35.4	
Turnout		1,056	71.6	
Conservative hold		Swing		

=== 2007-2011 ===
Nevile By-Election 23 October 2009
Party	Candidate	Votes	%	±%
Conservative	Tina Combellack	381	50.9	−19.3
Liberal Democrats	David Allen	368	49.1	+19.3
Majority		13	1.8	
Turnout		749	47.3	
Conservative hold		Swing		

Wiverton By-Election 6 May 2010
Party	Candidate	Votes	%	±%
Conservative	Sarah Bailey	1,264	54.0	+12.4
Liberal Democrats	Sue Hull	1,076	46.0	+46.0
Majority		188	8.0	
Turnout		2,340		
Conservative hold		Swing		

=== 2011-2015 ===
Leake By-Election 2 May 2013
Party	Candidate	Votes	%	±%
Conservative	John Thurman	793	41.0	−21.9
Independent	Carys Thomas	498	25.8	+25.8
Labour	Steve Collins	345	17.9	−19.2
UKIP	Matthew Faithfull	296	15.3	+15.3
Majority		295	15.3	
Turnout		1,932		
Conservative hold		Swing		

Gamston By-Election 20 March 2014
Party	Candidate	Votes	%	±%
Conservative	Jonathan Wheeler	444	44.2	−10.0
Labour	Alan Hardwick	218	21.7	−3.2
UKIP	Matthew Faithfull	173	17.2	+17.2
Liberal Democrats	Davinder Virdi	170	16.9	+6.9
Majority		226	22.5	
Turnout		1,005		
Conservative hold		Swing		

=== 2015-2019 ===
Cranmer By-Election 4 August 2016
Party	Candidate	Votes	%	±%
Conservative	Maureen Stockwood	318	54.3	−16.5
Independent	Tracey Kerry	138	23.5	+23.5
Labour	Chris Grocock	130	22.2	−7.0
Majority		180	30.7	
Turnout		586		
Conservative hold		Swing		

Thoroton By-Election 4 May 2017
Party	Candidate	Votes	%	±%
Conservative	Sarah Bailey	615	64.4	N/A
Independent	Tracey Kerry	215	22.5	N/A
Liberal Democrats	David Allen	125	13.1	N/A
Majority		400	41.9	
Turnout		955		
Conservative hold		Swing		

Gotham By-Election 23 August 2018
Party	Candidate	Votes	%	±%
Conservative	Rex Walker	355	40.4	−12.6
Labour	Lewis McAulay	275	31.3	+7.3
Independent	Stuart Matthews	160	18.2	+18.2
Liberal Democrats	Jason Billin	63	7.2	+7.2
Green	Neil Pinder	25	2.8	+2.8
Majority		80	9.1	
Turnout		878		
Conservative hold		Swing		

=== 2019-2023 ===
Sutton Bonington By-Election 6 May 2021
Party	Candidate	Votes	%	±%
Conservative	Matt Barney	402	66.2	+21.1
Labour	Andrew Edwards	143	23.6	−4.5
Liberal Democrats	Jason Billin	62	10.2	−16.6
Majority		259	42.7	
Turnout		607		
Conservative hold		Swing		

Musters By-Election 7 October 2021
Party	Candidate	Votes	%	±%
Liberal Democrats	Vicky Price	557	45.3	−11.4
Labour	Julie Chaplain	353	28.7	+8.9
Conservative	Paul Coe	320	26.0	+2.5
Majority		204	16.6	
Turnout		1,230		
Liberal Democrats hold		Swing		
