= Listed buildings in Stanford on Soar =

Stanford on Soar is a civil parish in the Rushcliffe district of Nottinghamshire, England. The parish contains 15 listed buildings that are recorded in the National Heritage List for England. Of these, one is listed at Grade I, the highest of the three grades, one is at Grade II*, the middle grade, and the others are at Grade II, the lowest grade. The parish contains the village of Stanford on Soar and the surrounding area. The largest building in the parish is Stanford Hall, which is listed together with associated buildings. The other listed buildings are in or near the village, and consist of a church, its lych gate, a farmhouse and barns, a packhorse bridge, and two rows of estate cottages.

== Key ==
| Grade | Criteria |
|---|---|
| I | Buildings of exceptional interest, sometimes considered to be internationally important |
| II* | Particularly important buildings of more than special interest |
| II | Buildings of national importance and special interest |

== Buildings ==
| Name and location | Photograph | Date | Notes | Grade |
|---|---|---|---|---|
| Church of St John the Baptist; 52.79285°N 1.19574°W | | 13th century | The church has been altered and extended through the centuries, including a restoration in 1893–94. It is built in stone with lead roofs, and consists of a nave with a clerestory, north and south aisles, a south porch, a chancel, a north vestry and an organ chamber, and a west tower. The tower has three stages, a moulded plinth, diagonal buttresses, bands, gargoyles, a frieze of quatrefoils set into lozenges, and an embattled parapet. On the west side is an arched doorway with a moulded surround, decorated spandrels and a hood mould, above which is a three-light window, a two-light window, clock faces on three fronts, stair lights, and arched bell openings. There are embattled parapets with crocketed pinnacles along the nave and the aisles. | I |
| Village Farmhouse; 52.79332°N 1.19482°W | | Early 18th century | The farmhouse, which has been divided, is in red brick with stone dressings, floor bands, and a tile roof with coped gables, kneelers and finials. There are two storeys and five bays, the outer bays projecting, on a stone plinth, and gabled, and the middle bay is also gabled. In the centre is a doorway, and above it is a blind window. The other windows are sashes, and in each gable apex is a recessed blind oval panel. To the left and recessed is a single-storey single-bay wing with a coped gable and a finial, containing a casement window with a segmental head. | II |
| Stanford Hall; 52.80946°N 1.17248°W | | 1777 | A country house that was altered and extended in about 1892, further extended in the 1930s, and later used for other purposes. It is in red brick on a stone plinth with stone dressings, floor bands, and a hipped slate roof with a balustrade. There is an entrance front of three storeys and a cellar, and seven bays. Between the bays are pilasters, rising above the ground floor to giant Ionic pilasters. In the centre is a porch with Ionic columns and pilasters, and an entablature, containing an arched doorway with moulded imposts and flanked by Doric columns with fluted capitals, and a frieze with roundels and swags. Above is a pediment with a coat of arms. The garden front has a central block of three storeys and seven bays, the middle three bays canted, and slightly projecting wings with two storeys and four bays. The central doorway has a pediment and the windows are sashes, some with cornices. | II* |
| 6, 7, 8 and 9 Main Street; 52.79287°N 1.19468°W | — | Late 18th century | A row of four estate cottages, remodelled in 1836, with stone dressings, a dentilled floor band, dogtooth eaves, and a tile roof with coped gables, kneelers and finials. There are two storeys and twelve bays, the outer bays projecting and gabled, and the central bay also gabled. In the centre is an entry with a wooden gate, there are five doorways, two blocked, and the windows are casements. The outer bays have a recessed oval panel in the apex, and in the apex of the middle bay is a painted panel with crests and the date, 1836. | II |
| Stanford Bridge; 52.79256°N 1.19842°W | — | Late 18th century | A packhorse bridge consisting of a single low wide arch with swept round ends, and a brick band. The parapet is damaged to the north and demolished to the south. | II |
| Sea lion pool, penguin pool and urns, Stanford Hall; 52.80901°N 1.17026°W | | Late 18th century | The structures in the grounds of the hall are in stone, and have since been used for other purposes, the sea lion pool as an auditorium, and the penguin pool as a rose garden. The sea lion pool has a diameter of about 120 metres (390 ft), and has two gateways, one with double iron gate and two small piers with orb finials. There is a culvert at the south with a balustraded footbridge, linking it to the penguin pool, which has a diameter of about 60 metres (200 ft), and flanking it are two decorative urns. | II |
| Barn, Village Farm; 52.79349°N 1.19488°W | — | Late 18th century | The barn is in red brick, with dogtooth eaves, and a tile roof with coped gables, kneelers and finials. There is a single storey and four bays, and it contains four lozenge vents. | II |
| Threshing barn, Village Farm; 52.79369°N 1.19497°W | | Late 18th century | The barn is in red brick, with dogtooth eaves, and a pantile roof with brick coped gables, kneelers and finials. There are three bays, and the openings on the street side are blocked. | II |
| Walled garden, Stanford Hall; 52.81102°N 1.16898°W | — | Early 19th century | The garden has a rectangular plan, and is enclosed by red brick walls with stone coping, and containing doorways. On the north side is a projecting conservatory on a red brick plinth. This has five bays, and a central doorway flanked by fixed lights, with decorative fanlights and decorative spandrels. On the roof is a continuous ventilator. In the west wall is a cottage in red brick with a slate roof incorporating earlier material. It has a sill band, dentilled eaves, two storeys and four bays, an arched doorway with Doric columns and a pediment, and sash windows. | II |
| 2, 3, 4 and 5 Main Street; 52.79420°N 1.19530°W | | 1839 | A row of four estate cottages in red brick, with stone dressings, a dentilled floor band, dogtooth eaves, and a tile roof with coped gables, kneelers and finials. There are two storeys and eleven bays, the outer bays projecting and gabled, and the central bay also gabled. In the centre is an entry with a wooden gate, there are four doorways, one blocked, and the windows are casements. The outer bays have a recessed oval panel in the apex, and in the apex of the middle bay is a painted panel with a heraldic emblem and the date, 1839. | II |
| Lychgate; 52.79331°N 1.19511°W | | 1894 | The lychgate at the entrance to the churchyard of the Church of St John the Baptist consists of stone walls carrying a decorative wooden frame and a gabled slate roof with decorative bargeboards. It contains a double gate in iron and wood, and on the east side is a dated wooden plaque. | II |
| Swimming pool, Stanford Hall; 52.81110°N 1.17138°W | | Late 1930s | The swimming pool is in stone and concrete, with walls on the west, north and south sides. It contains three curved concrete diving boards, a slide and a water course. Built into the walls are seats, rock pools and grottos. | II |
| Pavilion, Stanford Hall; 52.80918°N 1.17000°W | | Late 1930s | The pavilion in the grounds of the hall is in stone with a hipped slate roof. There is a single storey and three bays. It has outer pilaster strips, a central archway on Doric columns, and moulded entablatures in the outer bays. Extending from the sides are curving stone walls enclosing three semicircular steps. | II |
| Tennis pavilion, Stanford Hall; 52.80957°N 1.17496°W | — | Late 1930s | The tennis pavilion is in timber and render, probably over red brick, and has a hipped thatched roof. There is a single storey and three bays. It contains three open wooden arcades, the posts with braces, sliding doors. The side walls are oblique, and contain an oval window. | II |
| The Game House, Stanford Hall; 52.81029°N 1.17139°W | — | Late 1930s | The game house is in red brick with some stone and wood. There is a single storey and an octagonal plan. It has a red brick base with eight lights, over which is a chamfered stone band, surmounted by weatherboarding containing four casement windows. The roof is conical and tiled, with overhanging eaves, and an octagonal glover with a finial. | II |
