= 2011 Rushcliffe Borough Council election =

2011 UK local government election

The 2011 Rushcliffe Borough Council election took place on 5 May 2011 to elect members of Rushcliffe Borough Council in Nottinghamshire, England. The whole council was up for election.

== Overall election results ==
=== Rushcliffe Borough Council (Summary of Overall Results) ===
Rushcliffe Borough 2011 Election Results
Party	Seats	Gains	Losses	Net gain/loss	Seats %	Votes %	Votes	+/−
Conservative	36							
Liberal Democrats	6							
Labour	5							
Green	2							
Independent	1							
UKIP	0							

== Rushcliffe Borough Council - Results by Ward ==
=== Abbey ===
Abbey (2 seats)
Party	Candidate	Votes	%
Labour	John Robert Bannister (E)	790	21.9
Conservative	Brian Rudolf Buschman (E)	730	20.3
Labour	Andrew William Clayworth	674	18.7
Conservative	Tracey Lindsay Kerry	669	18.6
Green	Fiona Boyd	226	6.3
Green	David Carl Griffin	185	5.1
Liberal Democrats	Keith Michael Jamieson	178	4.9
Liberal Democrats	Malcolm James Todd	148	4.1

=== Bingham East ===
Bingham East (2 seats)
Party	Candidate	Votes	%
Liberal Democrats	George Davidson (E)	765	21.4
Conservative	Maureen Stockwood (E)	726	20.3
Conservative	Malcolm Roger Barham	699	19.6
Liberal Democrats	Patrick Stephen Drury Hanmer	501	14.0
Labour	Christopher Rupert Bear	462	13.0
Labour	Brian James Howes	416	11.7

=== Bingham West ===
Bingham West (2 seats)
Party	Candidate	Votes	%
Conservative	John Anthony Stockwood (E)	549	19.6
Conservative	Francis Anthoney Purdue-Horan (E)	506	18.0
Labour	Allen Herbert Ashmore	473	16.9
Liberal Democrats	Paul Douglas Abbey	429	15.3
Labour	John Edwin Bannard	428	15.3
Liberal Democrats	Susan Jennifer Hull	421	15.0

=== Compton Acres ===
Compton Acres (2 seats)
Party	Candidate	Votes	%
Conservative	Douglas Gordon Wheeler (E)	908	28.7
Conservative	Harry Tipton (E)	859	27.2
Labour	Heather Clayworth	479	15.1
Labour	Colin Jamie Sawers	441	13.9
Liberal Democrats	Diane Joan Rotherham	245	7.8
Green	Robert Wynford Breckles	231	7.3

=== Cotgrave ===
Cotgrave (3 seats)
Party	Candidate	Votes	%
Labour	Hayley Ann Chewings (E)	1,099	18.3
Conservative	Richard Langton Butler (E)	1,092	18.2
Conservative	Bryan Tansley (E)	1,035	17.2
Labour	Kathleen Margaret Foale	975	15.2
Conservative	Norman Stuart Monday	914	15.2
Labour	Susan Kathryn Tiplady	888	14.8

=== Cranmer ===
Cranmer (1 seat)
Party	Candidate	Votes	%
Conservative	Jacqueline Marie Marshall (E)	587	70.3
Labour	David Charles Holmes	248	29.7

=== Edwalton Village ===
Edwalton Village (2 seats)
Party	Candidate	Votes	%
Conservative	Peter Smith (E)	938	32.9
Conservative	Simon James Robinson (E)	872	30.6
Labour	Rebbecca Bailey	401	14.1
Labour	Laurence Turner	389	13.6
Liberal Democrats	Lawrence Harry Porter	252	8.8

=== Gamston ===
Gamston (2 seats)
Party	Candidate	Votes	%
Conservative	Leslie Barrie Cooper (E)	1,015	32.0
Conservative	Michael Hemsley (E)	837	26.4
Labour	Gareth David Bryning	466	14.7
Labour	Alan Hardwick	460	14.5
Green	Anthony Harold Latham	204	6.4
Liberal Democrats	Juliette Khan	187	5.9

=== Gotham ===
Gotham (1 seat)
Party	Candidate	Votes	%
Independent	Trevor Vennett-Smith (E)	848	88.2
Labour	Gillian Beryl Aldridge	113	11.8

=== Lady Bay ===
Lady Bay (2 seats)
Party	Candidate	Votes	%
Green	Susan Elizabeth Mallender (E)	984	23.8
Green	George Richard Mallender (E)	918	22.2
Labour	Alan Richard Tiplady	741	17.9
Labour	Rosemary Elizabeth	732	17.7
Conservative	Michael Maurice Champion	437	10.6
Conservative	Janet Ann Milbourn	332	8.0

=== Leake ===
Leake (3 seats)
Party	Candidate	Votes	%
Conservative	Margaret Marie Males (E)	1,469	22.1
Conservative	Ronald Hetherington (E)	1,422	21.4
Conservative	Brian George Dale (E)	1,330	20.0
Labour	Darren Naylor	866	13.0
Labour	Peter Leonard Warren	825	12.4
Labour	Lewis Pierson	749	11.3

=== Lutterell ===
Lutterell (2 seats)
Party	Candidate	Votes	%
Conservative	Basil Arthur Nicholls (E)	814	28.7
Conservative	Irving Israel Korn (E)	760	26.8
Labour	Martin Robert Davis	447	15.8
Labour	Jennifier Mary Wilson	412	14.5
Green	Julie Ann McGeorge	232	8.2
Liberal Democrats	Stewart Asquith Rotherham	171	6.0

=== Manvers ===
(Had been delayed until 16 June 2011)

Manvers (2 seats)
Party	Candidate	Votes	%
Conservative	James Edward Fearon (E)	730	35.9
Conservative	David Victor Smith (E)	692	34.0
Labour	Yvonne Pamela	323	15.9
Labour	John robert Thorn	290	14.3

=== Melton ===
Melton (2 seats)
Party	Candidate	Votes	%
Conservative	David Graham Bell (E)	645	18.9
Conservative	Angela Mary Dickinson (E)	644	18.9
Labour	Richard Theodore Parry Crawley	559	16.4
Labour	Peter Joseph Vallelly	519	15.2
Liberal Democrats	John Campbell Banks	342	10.0
Liberal Democrats	David Charles Turner	327	9.6
Green	Kate Amanda Breckles	230	6.7
Green	Paul James Bodenham	150	4.4

=== Musters ===
Musters (2 seats)
Party	Candidate	Votes	%
Liberal Democrats	Karrar Ahmad Khan (E)	1,057	30.2
Liberal Democrats	Rodney Martin Jones (E)	1,011	28.9
Conservative	Scott Carlton	376	10.7
Conservative	Chander Mohan Khera	365	10.4
Labour	Paul Fallon	356	10.2
Labour	Christopher John Wrigley	336	9.6

=== Nevile ===
Nevile (1 seat)
Party	Candidate	Votes	%
Conservative	Christine Maria Combellack (E)	500	54.1
Independent	David John Allen	424	49.1

=== North Keyworth ===
North Keyworth (1 seat)
Party	Candidate	Votes	%
Liberal Democrats	Samuel John Boote (E)	481	48.8
Conservative	Alistair Iain Grant	380	38.4
Labour	Robert David Crosby	125	12.7

=== Oak ===
Oak (1 seat)
Party	Candidate	Votes	%
Conservative	Nigel Cort Lawrence (E)	733	76.1
Labour	Avril Muriel Bear	230	23.9

=== Ruddington ===
Ruddington (3 seats)
Party	Candidate	Votes	%
Conservative	Jean Eileen Greenwood (E)	1,071	14.0
Labour	Nigel Keith Boughton-Smith (E)	908	11.9
Conservative	Ernest John Lungley (E)	886	11.6
Conservative	Sharon Isobel Buckle	883	11.6
Labour	Arun Chopra	847	11.1
Labour	Ian Wilson	835	10.9
Liberal Democrats	Barabara Maureen Venes	781	10.2
Liberal Democrats	Peter Frederick McGowan	654	8.6
Liberal Democrats	Michael Stephen McGowan	537	7.0
UKIP	Peter John Wolfe	243	3.2

=== Soar Valley ===
Soar Valley (1 seat)
Party	Candidate	Votes	%
Conservative	Nigel Andrew Brown (E)	545	59.7
Labour	Christopher Pierson	239	26.2
Liberal Democrats	Anthony George Turner	129	14.1

=== South Keyworth ===
South Keyworth (3 seats)
Party	Candidate	Votes	%
Conservative	John Elliott Cottee (E)	1,222	22.6
Liberal Democrats	Deborah Marie Boote (E)	884	16.4
Liberal Democrats	Linda Jane Abbey (E)	685	12.7
Conservative	Julie Deacon	661	12.2
Liberal Democrats	Nicholas John Riley	579	10.7
Conservative	Stanislaw Dziuba	528	9.8
Labour	Crosby Wanda Joan	448	8.3
Independent	William Donaldson	398	7.4

=== Stanford ===
Stanford (1 seat)
Party	Candidate	Votes	%
Conservative	Reginald Aaron Adair (E)	777	64.8
Labour	Paul David Morrissey	214	17.9
Liberal Democrats	Linda Joyce	132	11.0
UKIP	Patricia Ann Wolfe	76	6.3

=== Thoroton ===
Thoroton (1 seat)
Party	Candidate	Votes	%
Conservative	John Arthur Cranswick (E)	Elected unopposed	n/a

=== Tollerton ===
Tollerton (1 seat)
Party	Candidate	Votes	%
Conservative	Deborah Jane Mason (E)	655	83.2
Liberal Democrats	Mary Beatrice Starkey	132	16.8

=== Trent ===
Trent (2 seats)
Party	Candidate	Votes	%
Conservative	Jean Audrey Smith (E)	1,053	29.3
Conservative	Jonathan Neil Clarke (E)	1,036	28.9
Labour	David Hugh Barton	775	21.6
Labour	Stephen Hugh Collins	726	20.2

=== Trent Bridge ===
Trent Bridge (2 seats)
Party	Candidate	Votes	%
Labour	Elizabeth Ann Plant (E)	674	30.5
Labour	Alistair MacInnes (E)	657	29.7
Conservative	Hilary Jane Tinley	333	15.0
Conservative	Ian Hamilton Walker	293	13.2
Liberal Democrats	Stephen Noel Travis	182	8.2
UKIP	Terry George Coleman	74	3.3

=== Wiverton ===
Wiverton (2 seats)
Party	Candidate	Votes	%
Conservative	Gordon Sidney Moore (E)	900	39.2
Conservative	Sarah Paulina Bailey (E)	804	35.1
Liberal Democrats	Lesley Hilary Vaughan-Thomas	590	25.7

=== Wolds ===
Wolds (1 seat)
Party	Candidate	Votes	%
Conservative	Fiona Jayne Mason (E)	746	75.2
Liberal Democrats	Sheila Ann Gauld	176	17.7
UKIP	Heather Ward	70	7.1

== By-Elections between May 2011 - May 2015 ==
By-elections are called when a representative Councillor resigns or dies, so are unpredictable. A by-election is held to fill a political office that has become vacant between the scheduled elections.

=== Leake - 2 May 2013 ===
Leake by election 2nd May 2013
Party	Candidate	Votes	%	±%
Conservative	John Thurman (E)	793	41.1	−22.1
Independent	Carys Thomas	498	25.8	+25.8
Labour	Steve Collins	345	17.9	−18.9
UKIP	Matthew Faithfull	296	15.3	+15.3
Majority		295		
Turnout				
Conservative hold		Swing		

=== Gamston - 20 March 2014 ===
Gamston by election 20 March 2014
Party	Candidate	Votes	%	±%
Conservative	Jonathan Gordon Alexander Wheeler (E)	444	44.2	−10.0
Labour	Alan Hardwick	218	21.7	−3.2
UKIP	Matthew Faithfull	173	17.2	+17.2
Liberal Democrats	Davinder Virdi	170	16.9	+6.9
Majority				
Turnout				
Conservative hold		Swing		
