= Stanford Hall =

There are two stately homes in England called Stanford Hall.

- Stanford Hall, Leicestershire, near Lutterworth
- Stanford Hall, Nottinghamshire (Defence and National Rehabilitation Centre), near Loughborough

== United States ==
- Stanford Hall, a dormitory at the University of Notre Dame, South Bend, Indiana
