= Stanford on Soar =

Village in Nottinghamshire, England

Coordinates: 52.794°N 1.195°W

- Village and civil parish
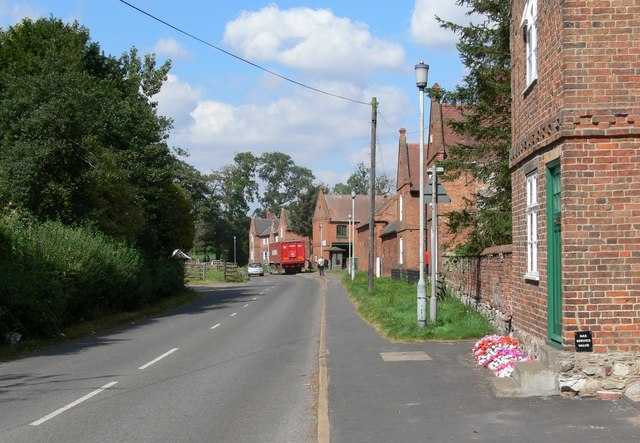
- Main Street in Stanford on Soar

- Location within Nottinghamshire
- Interactive map of Stanford on Soar
- Area: 2.37 sq mi (6.1 km^{2})
- Population: 154 (2021)
  - Density: 65/sq mi (25/km^{2})
- OS grid reference: SK543221
  - London: 100 mi (160 km) SSE
- Civil parish: Stanford on Soar
- District: Rushcliffe
- Shire county: Nottinghamshire
- Region: East Midlands
- Country: England
- Sovereign state: United Kingdom
- Post town: LOUGHBOROUGH
- Postcode district: LE12
- Dialling code: 01509
- Police: Nottinghamshire
- Fire: Nottinghamshire
- Ambulance: East Midlands
- UK Parliament: Rushcliffe
- Website: www.stanfordonsoarparishcouncil.org.uk

Stanford on Soar, known locally as Stanford, is a village and civil parish in the Rushcliffe district of Nottinghamshire, England near the River Soar.

== Description ==
=== Setting ===
Stanford on Soar is located near the River Soar just within the Nottinghamshire side of the Nottinghamshire/Leicestershire boundary. It is around a mile north of Loughborough in Leicestershire. It is the southernmost place within the county of Nottinghamshire. Other nearby places are East Leake, Normanton on Soar and Cotes.

White's Directory of Nottinghamshire, written in 1853, describes Stanford as follows:

Stanford-On-Soar is a small, picturesque village and parish, one and a half miles north of Loughborough, at the point where the River Soar enters Leicestershire. It has about 140 inhabitants and 1,520 acres of land, all belonging to the Rev. Samuel Dashwood, who is both patron and incumbent of the rectory, and resides in the Hall, a modern mansion, which stands on a commanding eminence, and is surrounded by a beautifully wooded park of considerable extent. The tithes were commuted in 1842 for £420, exclusive of 13 acres of ancient glebe.

John Throsby, writing during 1790 in his new edition of Robert Thoroton's Antiquities of Nottinghamshire, describes Stanford as follows:

Which is over the river Soar, and parts Leicestershire from Nottinghamshire, is pleasing: The banks of the river, on the Nottingham side, are adorned with trees, set too regular, if on a plain, to strike the eye of taste; but the line of the eminence being irregular, diversifies the studied formality of the planter, and creates beauty, towards which the stream below, contributes not a little. The Church, which is beautifully embowered with trees, has 3 bells (see plate page 13, fig. 1.) a nave and two side aisles, neatly pewed. The Chancel is large.

=== Population ===
The population of the civil parish was 128 at the 2011 census, and contains 48 households. This increased to 154 residents at the 2021 census, and 50 households.

== Heritage ==
=== Listed Buildings ===
==== Church of St John the Baptist (Grade I) ====
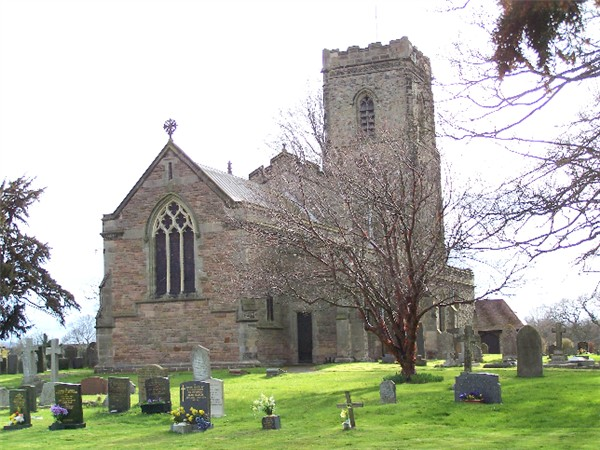
Church of St John the Baptist

The Church of St John the Baptist is a Grade I listed church located in the centre of the village. The church began in the 13th century and underwent a significant restoration in 1893. It is within the Anglican Diocese of Southwell and Nottingham and is the most southerly parish in the Province of York. It also forms part of a joint benefice with the neighbouring parishes of Costock, East Leake, West Leake and Rempstone. There is a Rector and Associate Priest.

White's Directory of Nottinghamshire, written in 1853, describes the Church of St John the Baptist as follows:

The church is a neat edifice embowered in thick foliage, with a handsome tower and four bells,, and dedicated to St Luke, and contains several rural monuments of the Lewis's and others. The chancel window is principally composed of stained glass. The rectory is valued in the King's books at £9 7s 8d, now £435. The worthy owner gives £5 a year to the poor of this parish, and also supports an infant school. A feast is held on the first Sunday after St Luke's day.

John Throsby, writing during 1790 in his new edition of Robert Thoroton's Antiquities of Nottinghamshire, describes the Church of St John the Baptist as follows:

The Church, which is beautifully embowered with trees, has 3 bells (see plate page 13, fig. 1.) a nave and two side aisles, neatly pewed. The Chancel is large. In it rest the remains of Robert Lewes, Rector, who died in 1686, aged 72. John Price, Rector, who died in 1665. Richard Alleyne, Rector, who died in 1767, aged 62. Francis Thwaits, Rector, who died in 1721, aged 74. Daniel Pogson, Curate of Loughborough, who died in 1739, and Mr. Richard Lewes, who died in 1670, aged 60. The Tomb mentioned in Thoroton for Radolphus Illingworth, &c. remains, but much defaced. The outlines of a man and woman are figured thereon, praying. Here is a brass figure on the floor not noticed by Thoroton, no inscription: The upper part of this figure is represented, fig. 7, page 112...

The roof of the nave is adorned with carved figures as supporters. And here is a neat little font... The earliest Register begins 1633. In the 5 first years, Bap. 14. Buried 12.---The last five, Bap. 9. Bur. 8. Decreased in Bap. 5, Bur. 4. The parsonage-house seems a dwelling of convenience, detached from the Village.

==== Stanford Hall (Grade II*) ====
Stanford Hall is a Grade II* listed country house located in the north of the parish.

John Throsby, writing during 1790 in his new edition of Robert Thoroton's Antiquities of Nottinghamshire, describes Stanford Hall as follows:

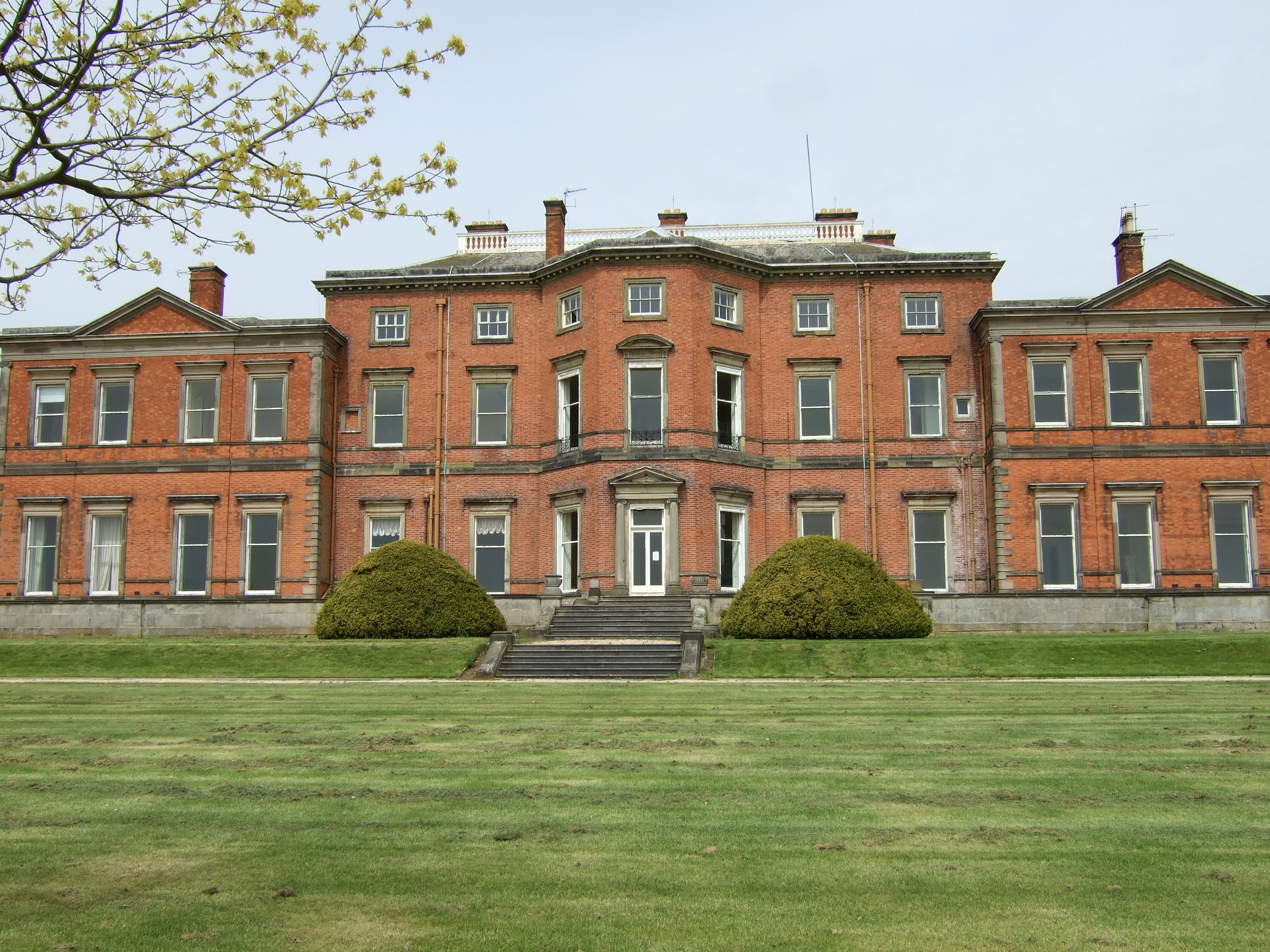
Stanford Hall

The seat of Charles Vere Dashwood, Esq. It stands on a rising ground, about a mile from the village, and 13 from Nottingham, a pleasing view of which is seen from the turnpike-road, leading from Loughborough to Nottingham. I have often viewed it with pleasure; but I approached this seat with some unfavorable impressions at seeing the park or paddock, on the back part of the house, environed by plantations of young trees, which wholly intercept the sight of some beautifully formed, and as well-disposed ones I ever beheld. A break or two in the line leading from the steward's farm might please. The annexed view I took on the bank of a fine sheet of water below the house; but while I was thus employed I was miserably tortured by the gnat-flies. Here, by varying your position, might be taken some good Field Pictures, removing, or rather leaving out, some offensive plots of cultivated ground, and fence, which meet the eye on the fore ground: Instead of which I have taken the liberty to substitute in their place, some native verdure. I observed in another place that this Mansion was built by the present owner, Charles Vere Dashwood, Esq. It was begun in the year 1771, and finished in 1774, on the scite of ground whereon stood a large stone building. The present building is mostly of brick: The architect and undertaker Mr. Anderson. The apartments in general seem more calculated for convenience than magnificence. The dining-room contains some family pictures. Smith, who is now at Rome, has painted Mr. Dashwood and family, whole lengths, in one piece: The likenesses may be good, for they are mostly like one another; there is a doll-like painting dash upon the cheeks of the figutes which is offensive Mrs. Marnom, sister to Mrs. Dashwood, is also painted by Smith. Of portraits Miss Sophia Dashwood's is the best. There is a moon-light piece of some merit, and a sea piece.

In the library is a landscape, with two horses, by Mr. Boultbee, in his best manner; but they are not in a favorable place, for in the same room is a horse by Stubbs. Here is also a portrait of Mrs. Dashwood, by Romney, an admirable fox-dog, and two landscapes by the Rev. Mr. Carr, in water-colours.

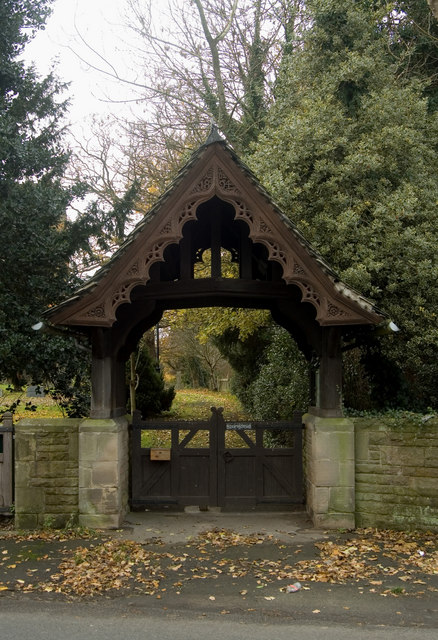
Grade II listed lychgate at the Church of St John the Baptist

There is an excellent look-out from a window in the withdrawing-room: The forest hills in Leicestershire, bound the prospect with a line of beauty. In some parts it is broken or diversified with pleasing objects: Quarndon woods and Mountsorrel are seen on the left; Loughborough is seated in the middle of an amphitheatre; behind it Mrs. Tate's house at Burley; and on the right Garendon park and mansion are conspicuous. The little village and church of Stanford, aid the scene. The passing clouds cast some broad shades upon the foreground of the picture, which contributed much to the beauty of the whole. If in this delightful view there be a fault, it is its being overcharged with objects. Mrs. Dashwood's dressing-room is adorned with some good prints: A portrait of a dog and fowls deserves a frame. In another room I saw a number of good prints stuck against a wall, spoiling. In an attic story I saw, or thought I saw, Lord Middleton's house, and Nottingham castle. Let it be remembered that the housekeeper, at Mr. Dashwood's, possessed that courteous manner to a stranger, which is easily obtained by servants in a well-bred family. I observed above that this dwelling was environed by a plantation of young trees: At leaving the hall I took a nearer view of it, and found a fine carriage ride, nearly a mile in length, in the middle of it, which must be exceedingly agreeable in the spring, before flies are troublesome. Here Mr. Dashwood and his young ladies, often taking an airing when in the country.

Stanford Hall has been developed into The Defence and National Rehabilitation Centre (DNRC). The three year construction process began on 24 August 2015 and was completed in 2018 when it was handed over to the Ministry of Defence.

==== Other listed buildings ====
In addition to the Church of St John the Baptist (Grade I) and Stanford Hall (Grade II*) there are thirteen other listed structures in Stanford, all Grade II listed.

Excluding Stanford Hall (Grade II*) there are six further listed buildings within the grounds (all Grade II listed): Pavilion in the Gardens of Stanford Hall; Sea Lion Pool, Penguin Pool and Urns in the Gardens of Stanford Hall; Swimming Pool at Stanford Hall; Tennis Pavilion in Grounds of Stanford Hall; The Game House; and the Walled Garden at Stanford Hall.

Excluding the Church of St John the Baptist (Grade I) there are five further listed buildings near the village centre: 2, 3, 4 and 5, Main Street; 6, 7, 8 and 9, Main Street; Barn at Village Farm Attached to Farmhouse; Lychgate to Churchyard of Church of St John the Baptist; Stanford Bridge; Threshing Barn at Village Farm; and Village Farmhouse Incorporating Post Office.

=== Other heritage ===
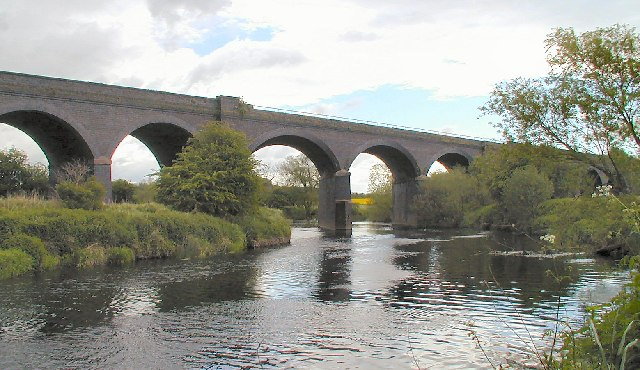
Stanford Viaduct

Close to the church there is a viaduct (Stanford Viaduct) over the River Soar carrying the former Great Central Railway. This stretch of line runs from the Midland Main Line at Loughborough South Junction to Ruddington and carries freight trains to the British Gypsum works at East Leake as well as heritage steam and diesel trains. There are proposals to build a railway bridge over the Midland Main Line, known as Loughborough Gap, at the east end of Loughborough Station to reconnect this stretch with the remaining Great Central Railway (preserved) running from Loughborough Central railway station to Leicester North. There is no rail station in the village, however Loughborough railway station on the Midland Main Line is around 2 km away and provides a range of National Rail services.

== Local government and elections ==
=== Parliamentary elections ===
The village is part of the Rushcliffe constituency in the House of Commons. The constituency was notable as it was represented by Kenneth Clarke, of the Conservative party, who had held the seat from 1970 to 2019.

=== Local government ===
==== County council ====
For Nottinghamshire County Council elections the parish comes within the Leake & Ruddington electoral ward, which has two council seats. The most recent election was in May 2017, when Andy Brown and Reg Adair, both of the Conservative party, won the two available seats.

==== Borough council ====
For the election of a councillor to Rushcliffe Borough Council, the parish forms part of the Leake ward, which has three council seats. The most recent election was on 7 May 2015 when Ronald Hetherington, Margaret Males and John Thurman, all of the Conservative party, won the three available seats. The next Borough election will be on 2 May 2019.

==== Parish council ====
Stanford on Soar has a parish council.

== Amenities ==
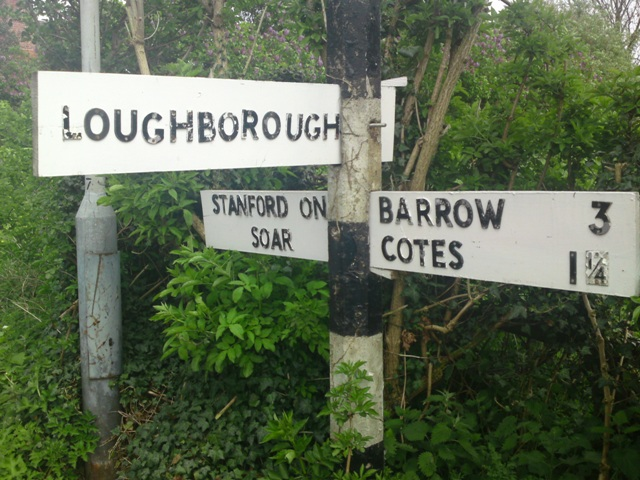
Road sign in Stanford on Soar

=== Transport ===
Stanford on Soar benefits from three bus services: 1 Nottingham to Loughborough, 3 Ratcliffe on Soar to Loughborough and 4 Ratcliffe on Soar to Loughborough. On weekdays the 1 Nottingham to Loughborough bus service calls around every half-hour early morning until late evening.

=== Other amenities ===
The village has two postboxes, located on Main Street and Leake Lane.

== Gallery ==
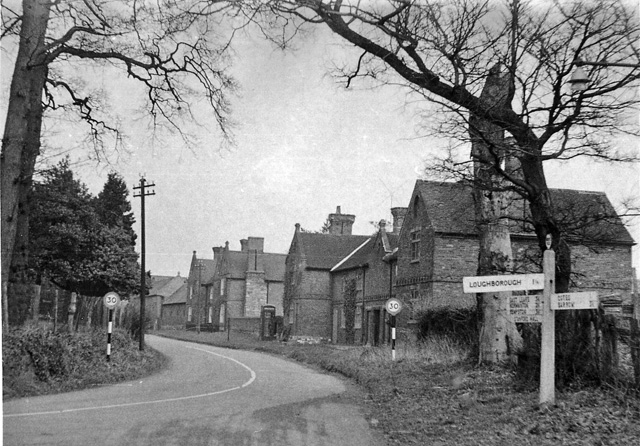
Old photograph of Main Street in Stanford on Soar

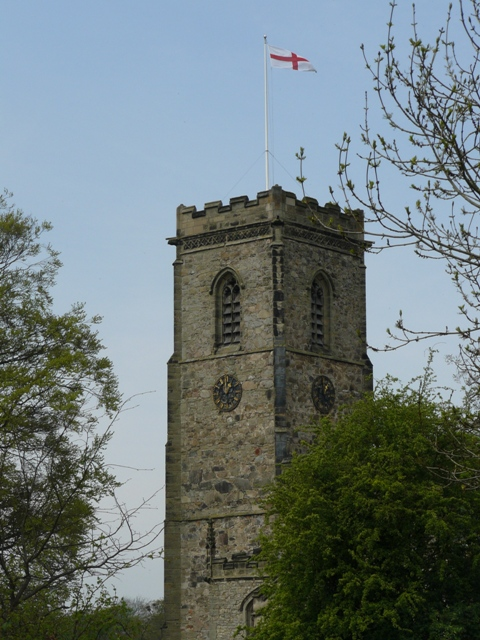
The tower of the Church of St John the Baptist

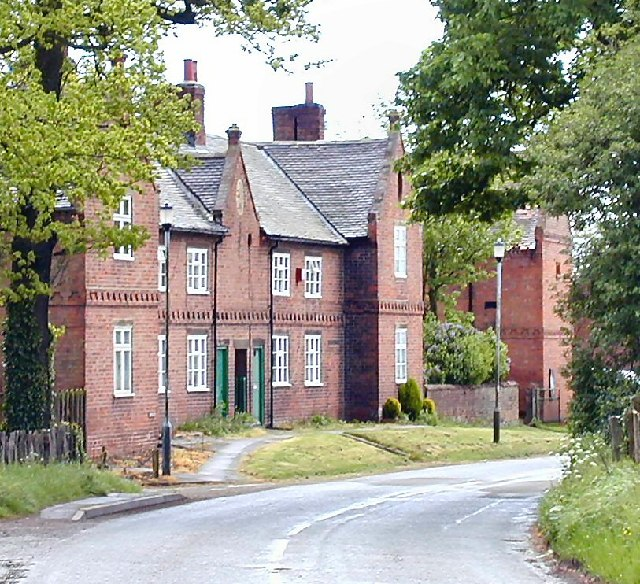
Main Street in Stanford on Soar

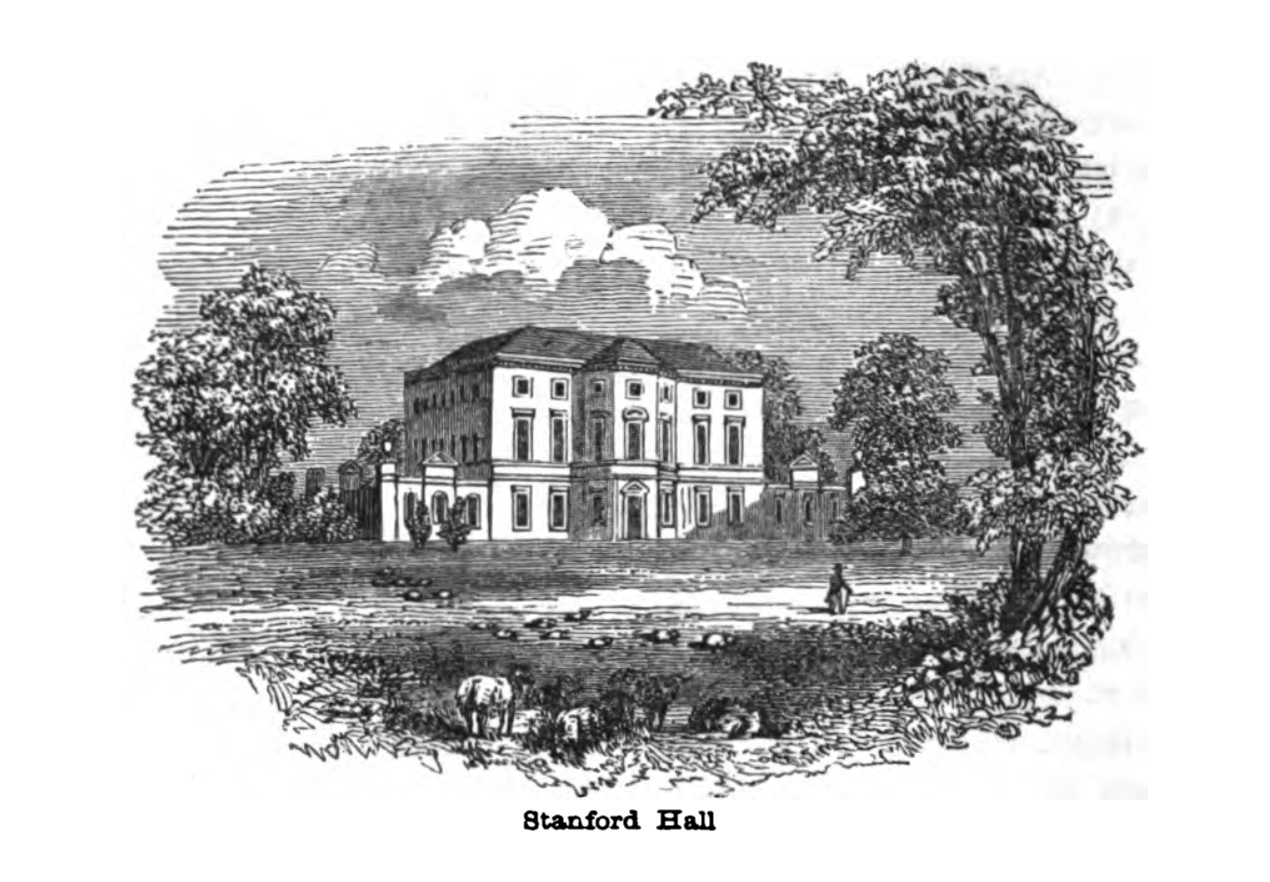
Old photograph of Stanford Hall

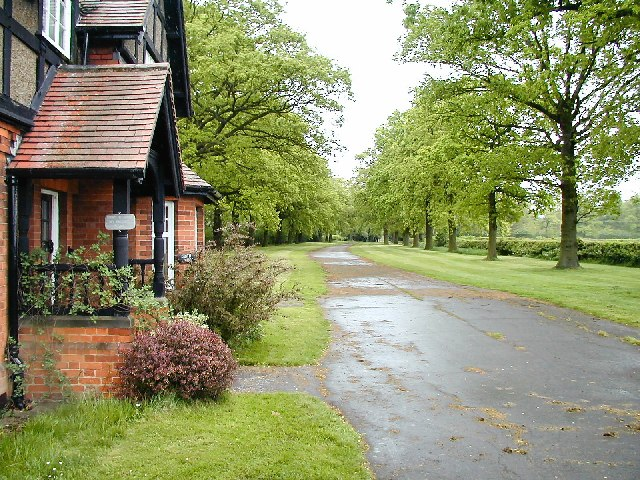
The gatehouse and driveway of Stanford Hall

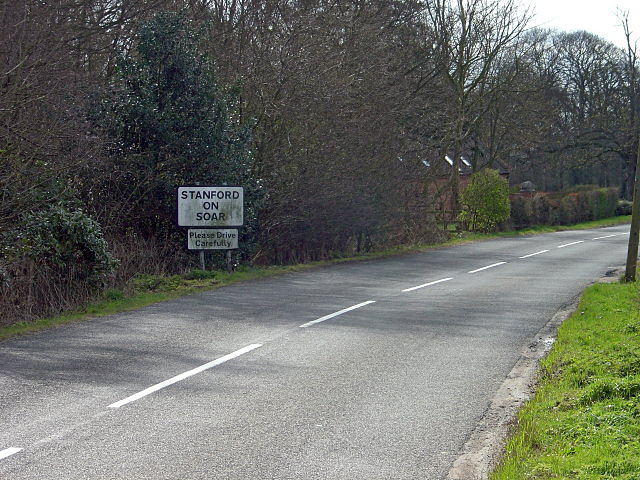
Village entrance sign to Stanford on Soar
