= Church of St John the Baptist, Stanford on Soar =

Church in Nottinghamshire, England

Coordinates: 52°47′35″N 01°11′44″W

Church of St. John the Baptist, Stanford on Soar
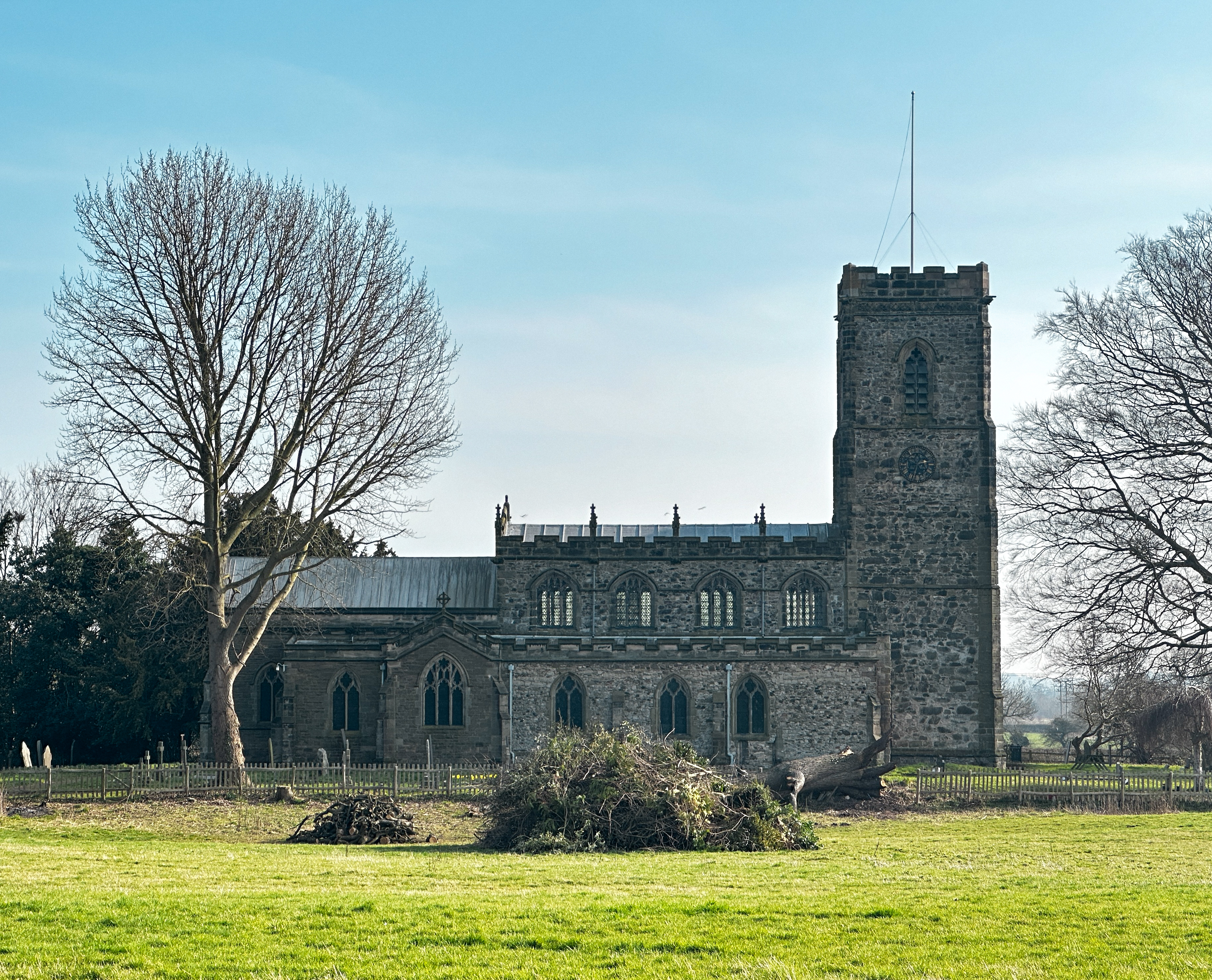
- St. John the Baptist, Stanford on Soar
- Church of St. John the Baptist, Stanford on Soar
- Denomination: Church of England
- Churchmanship: Low Church

History
- Dedication: St. John the Baptist

Administration
- Province: York
- Diocese: Southwell and Nottingham
- Parish: Stanford on Soar

The Church of St. John the Baptist, Stanford on Soar is a parish church in the Church of England in Stanford on Soar, Nottinghamshire.

The church is Grade I listed by the Department for Digital, Culture, Media and Sport as a building of outstanding architectural or historic interest.

The church holds at least one service every Sunday. Services use the Book of Common Prayer.

== History ==
The church was medieval but restored in 1893 and 1894 by W. S. Weatherley.

It is the most southerly church in the Diocese of Southwell and Nottingham and the Province of York.

== Pipe organ ==
The church has a fine two manual pipe organ by Henry Willis dating from 1895. A specification of the organ can be found on the National Pipe Organ Register

== Clock ==
Mr Richard Ratcliff of Stanford Hall presented a clock and chimes to the church in 1898. It was constructed by John Smith and Sons of Derby and chimed Cambridge Quarters and struck the hour. The time was indicated on three dials on the exterior of the tower.

== Bells ==
The church has eight bells.

== Current parish status ==
It is in a group of parishes which includes:

- St. Giles' Church, Costock
- St. Mary's Church, East Leake
- All Saints' Church, Rempstone
- St. Helena's Church, West Leake
- Church of St. John the Baptist, Stanford on Soar

== See also ==
- Grade I listed buildings in Nottinghamshire
- Listed buildings in Stanford on Soar

== Sources ==
- Southwell and Nottingham Church History Project Stanford on Soar
