= Stanford Viaduct =

Railway viaduct near Stanford on Soar, Nottinghamshire

Coordinates: 52°47′25.00″N 1°11′50.50″W

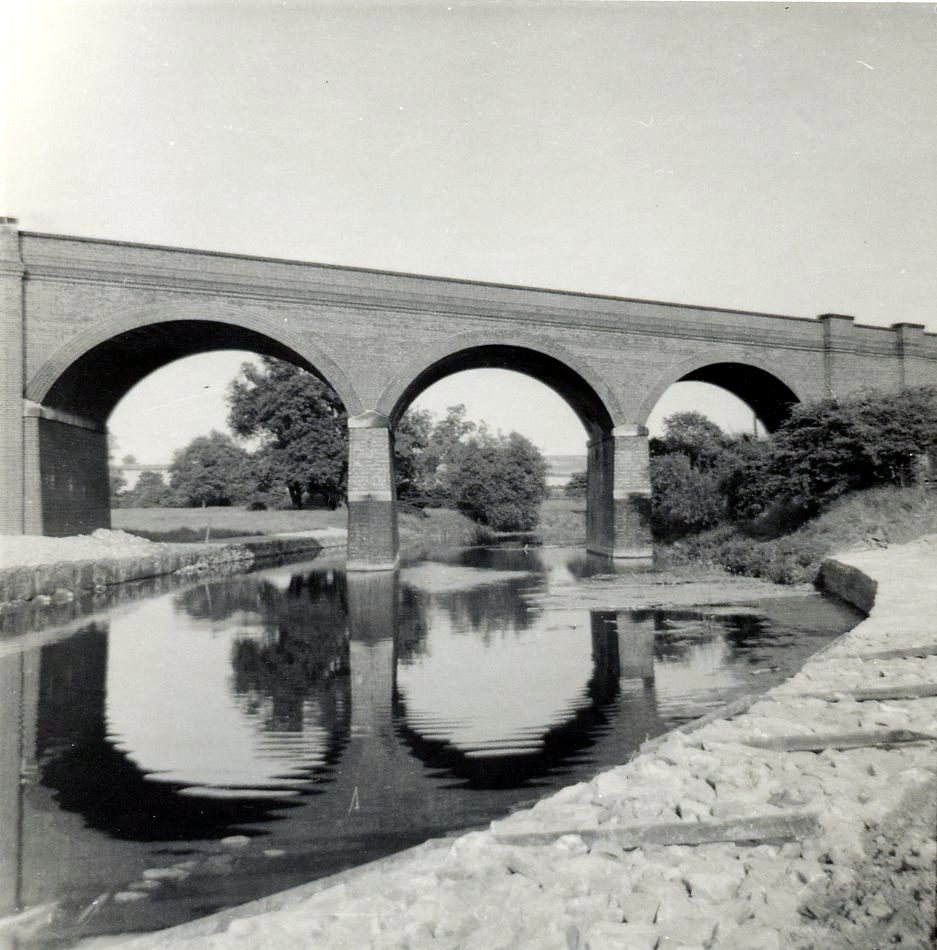
Stanford Viaduct c1955

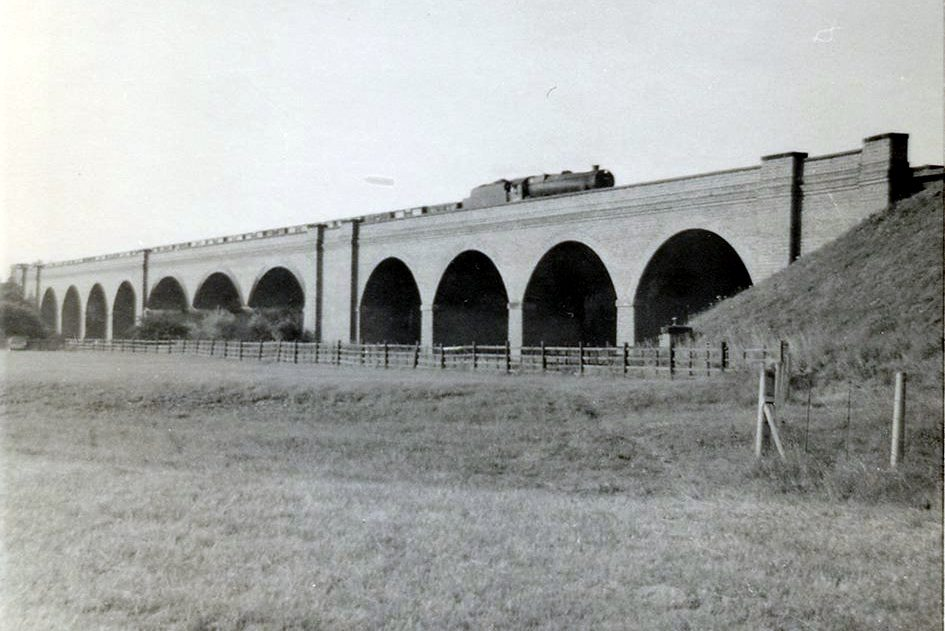
Stanford Viaduct c1955

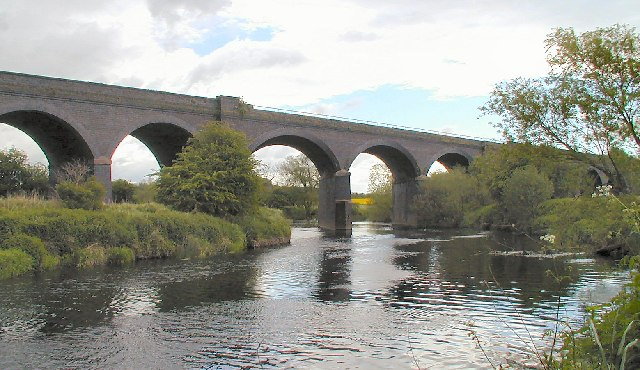
Stanford Viaduct 2005

Stanford Viaduct is a railway viaduct in Leicestershire and Nottinghamshire. It is named after the nearby village of Stanford on Soar.

Built as part of the Great Central Railway's London Extension opened in 1899, it carried the Great Central Main Line over the River Soar and a road (Meadow Lane). It was built out of blue brick by the contractor, Henry Lovatt of Wolverhampton. The three central arches are skewed to allow the Soar to pass underneath.

When the rest of the GCML was closed in the 1960s, the section from Loughborough South Junction was kept open as a branch of the Midland Main Line to the British Gypsum works at East Leake.

Currently, the viaduct is not used by gypsum trains, but heritage services on the Great Central Railway (Nottingham) run semi-regularly with a 10mph speed limit on the viaduct due to damage to the trackside walls.
