= 2023 Rushcliffe Borough Council election =

2023 English local election

- 4 May 2023

All 44 seats to Rushcliffe Borough Council 23 seats needed for a majority

	First party	Second party	Third party
Leader	Simon Robinson	Jen Walker
Party	Conservative	Labour	Independent
Seats before	26	6	6 (Note: Of the six independent councillors prior to the election, three formed the "Leake Independents" group led by Carys Thomas, the other three did not belong to any group.)
Seats after	25	9	5
	Fourth party	Fifth party	Sixth party
Leader	Sue Mallender & Richard Mallender	Ted Birch	Rod Jones
Party	Green	Rushcliffe Ind.	Liberal Democrats
Seats before	3	0	3
Seats after	2	2	1
- Results by ward
Leader before election
Simon Robinson
Conservative
Leader after election
Neil Clarke
Conservative

The 2023 Rushcliffe Borough Council election took place on 4 May 2023, to elect all 44 members of Rushcliffe Borough Council in Nottinghamshire, England. This was on the same day as other local elections across England.

The council had been under Conservative majority control since 1999. The leader of the council prior to the election was Simon Robinson, but he chose not to stand for re-election.

The Conservatives retained their majority at the election. At the subsequent annual council meeting on 25 May 2023, Neil Clarke was appointed the new leader of the council. He had previously held the position between 2005 and 2017.

== Background ==
Rushcliffe is one of the seven non-metropolitan districts that make up Nottinghamshire County Council. Since its creation in 1973, the Conservatives have held a majority in all elections, apart from 1995 when the council fell into no overall control with the Conservatives remaining the largest party. In the 2019 election, the Conservatives won 29 seats with 43.3% of the vote, Labour won 7 with 26.2%, the Liberal Democrats won 3 with 12.9%, independents won 3 with 7.3%, and the Green Party won 2 with 9.4%.

The 2023 elections took place on new boundaries. Six wards (Bingham East, Bingham West, Gamston North, Gamston South, Sutton Bonington, and Thoroton) were abolished; five wards (Bingham North, Bingham South, Gamston, Newton, and Soar Valley) were created. In addition, two wards (Abbey and Gotham) gained seats and two wards (Lutterell and Trent Bridge) lost seats.

== Previous council composition ==
After 2019 election		Before 2023 election	
Party	Seats	Party	Seats
Conservative	29	Conservative	26
Labour	7	Labour	6
Liberal Democrats	3	Liberal Democrats	3
Independent	3	Independent	6
Green	2	Green	3

=== Changes ===
- June 2020: Ron Hetherington (Conservative) resigns; by-election held in May 2021
- May 2021: Matt Barney (Conservative) wins by-election
- September 2021: Annie Major (Liberal Democrats) resigns; by-election held in October 2021
- October 2021: Vicky Price (Liberal Democrats) wins by-election; John Stockwood and Francis Purdue-Horan suspended from the Conservatives
- March 2023: Benjamin Gray defects to the Green Party from Labour
- April 2023: Maureen Stockwood leaves the Conservatives to sit as an independent.

== Results summary ==
2023 Rushcliffe Borough Council election
Party	Candidates	Seats	Gains	Losses	Net gain/loss	Seats %	Votes %	Votes	+/−
Conservative	44	25			4 ▼	56.8			
Green	14	2			0	4.5			
Labour	35	9			2 ▲	20.5			
Liberal Democrats	11	1			2 ▼	2.3			
Reform	1	0			0	0.0			
Rushcliffe Independents	5	2			2 ▲	4.5			
Independent	15	5			2 ▲	11.4			

== Ward results ==
The results for each ward were as follows, with an asterisk (*) indicating a sitting councillor standing for re-election.

=== Abbey ===
Abbey
Party	Candidate	Votes	%	±%
Labour	Penny Gowland*	1,730	57.9	
Labour	Julie Chaplain	1,626	54.4	
Labour	Steve Calvert	1,527	51.1	
Conservative	Darius Furmonavicius	1,012	33.9	
Conservative	Stephen Duckworth	1,010	33.8	
Conservative	Amit Garg	935	31.3	
Green	Sandra Lee	416	13.9	
Green	Ian Whitehead	366	12.3	
Liberal Democrats	Keith Jamieson	340	11.3	
Turnout		3,141	51.6	
Registered electors		6,081		
Labour win (new boundaries)				
Labour win (new boundaries)				
Labour win (new boundaries)				

=== Bingham North ===
Bingham North
Party	Candidate	Votes	%	±%
Conservative	Nigel Regan	593	44.8	
Conservative	Gareth Williams*	587	44.3	
Independent	Wayne Stapleton	399	30.1	
Independent	Nadia Jejna	379	28.6	
Independent	Stephen Perkins	355	26.8	
Independent	Francis Purdue-Horan*	336	25.3	
Turnout		1,423	36.5	
Registered electors		3,899		
Conservative win (new boundaries)				
Conservative win (new boundaries)				

=== Bingham South ===
Bingham South
Party	Candidate	Votes	%	±%
Independent	Rowan Bird	768	45.7	
Independent	Elena Georgiou	525	31.2	
Conservative	Clare Williams	447	26.6	
Conservative	Paul Simpson	406	24.2	
Labour	Peter Vallelly	395	23.5	
Liberal Democrats	Andrew Wood	290	17.3	
Independent	Maureen Stockwood*	277	16.5	
Independent	Andrew Shelton	254	15.1	
Turnout		1,796	41.3	
Registered electors		4,347		
Independent win (new boundaries)				
Independent win (new boundaries)				

=== Bunny ===
Bunny
Party	Candidate	Votes	%	±%
Conservative	Andy Edyvean*	603	51.7	
Labour	Jim Coyle	286	24.5	
Rushcliffe Ind.	Will Birch	278	23.8	
Turnout		1,171	49.2	
Registered electors		2,378		
Conservative win (new boundaries)				

=== Compton Acres ===
Compton Acres
Party	Candidate	Votes	%	±%
Conservative	Alan Phillips*	1,188	55.3	
Conservative	Hari Om	1,169	54.4	
Labour	Catherine Carmichael	742	34.5	
Labour	Graham Johnson	671	31.2	
Liberal Democrats	Rod Jones	192	8.9	
Green	William Richardson	174	8.1	
Green	Richard Holmes	161	7.5	
Turnout		2,257	49.7	
Registered electors		4,542		
Conservative win (new boundaries)				
Conservative win (new boundaries)				

=== Cotgrave ===
Cotgrave
Party	Candidate	Votes	%	±%
Conservative	Richard Butler*	1,033	60.3	
Rushcliffe Ind.	Keir Chewings	1,033	60.3	
Conservative	Stuart Ellis	748	43.7	
Conservative	Leo Healy*	713	41.6	
Labour	John Clements	612	35.7	
Labour	Andy Naslas	526	30.7	
Independent	Darren Stothard	475	27.7	
Turnout		2,046	32.7	
Registered electors		6,264		
Conservative win (new boundaries)				
Rushcliffe Ind. win (new boundaries)				
Conservative win (new boundaries)				

=== Cranmer ===
Cranmer
Party	Candidate	Votes	%	±%
Labour	Chris Grocock	620	56.0	
Conservative	Sarah Bailey*	487	44.0	
Turnout		1,121	43.4	
Registered electors		2,581		
Labour win (new boundaries)				

=== Cropwell ===
Cropwell
Party	Candidate	Votes	%	±%
Rushcliffe Ind.	Ted Birch	485	54.3	
Conservative	Gordon Moore*	408	45.7	
Turnout		905	44.3	
Registered electors		2,043		
Rushcliffe Ind. win (new boundaries)				

=== East Bridgford ===
East Bridgford
Party	Candidate	Votes	%	±%
Conservative	David Simms*	513	48.4	
Labour	Steve Kilduff	316	29.8	
Independent	Monica Monni	231	21.8	
Turnout		1,069	47.4	
Registered electors		2,256		
Conservative win (new boundaries)				

=== Edwalton ===
Edwalton
Party	Candidate	Votes	%	±%
Conservative	Hetvi Parekh	980	67.1	
Conservative	Douglas Wheeler	913	62.6	
Labour	Brian Robinson	461	31.6	
Labour	Charles Standring	400	27.4	
Liberal Democrats	Nancy Smith-Mitsch	165	11.3	
Turnout		1,561	39.0	
Registered electors		3,998		
Conservative win (new boundaries)				
Conservative win (new boundaries)				

=== Gamston ===
Gamston
Party	Candidate	Votes	%	±%
Conservative	Jonathan Wheeler*	970	56.1	
Conservative	Davinder Virdi*	862	49.9	
Labour	John Bannister	603	34.9	
Labour	Chris Geeson	580	33.6	
Green	Elizabeth Mollatt	237	13.7	
Liberal Democrats	Terry Morrell	204	11.8	
Turnout		1,840	40.9	
Registered electors		4,494		
Conservative win (new boundaries)				
Conservative win (new boundaries)				

=== Gotham ===
Gotham
Party	Candidate	Votes	%	±%
Conservative	Rex Walker*	561	66.0	
Conservative	Andy Brown	437	51.4	
Labour	Lewis McAulay	336	39.6	
Labour	Gill Aldridge	276	32.5	
Liberal Democrats	Mike Wright	89	10.5	
Turnout		921	45.4	
Registered electors		2,030		
Conservative win (new boundaries)				
Conservative win (new boundaries)				

=== Keyworth & Wolds ===
Keyworth & Wolds
Party	Candidate	Votes	%	±%
Conservative	John Cottee*	1,653	59.4	
Conservative	Rob Inglis*	1,417	50.9	
Conservative	Tony Wells	1,207	43.4	
Independent	Shelley Millband	992	35.7	
Liberal Democrats	Linda Abbey	973	35.0	
Labour	David Clarke	792	28.5	
Labour	Kevin Fitzgerald	674	24.2	
Labour	Kev Lowe	639	23.0	
Turnout		3,120	48	
Registered electors		6,506		
Conservative win (new boundaries)				
Conservative win (new boundaries)				
Conservative win (new boundaries)				

=== Lady Bay ===
Lady Bay
Party	Candidate	Votes	%	±%
Green	Sue Mallender*	1,452	62.7	
Green	Richard Mallender*	1,367	59.0	
Labour	Keith Wright	679	29.3	
Labour	Richard Crouch	672	29.0	
Conservative	Luke Dorian	249	10.7	
Conservative	Jean Smith	216	9.3	
Turnout		2,381	50	
Registered electors		4,761		
Green win (new boundaries)				
Green win (new boundaries)				

=== Leake ===
Leake
Party	Candidate	Votes	%	±%
Independent	Carys Thomas*	1,518	62.7	
Independent	Jason Billin	1,449	59.8	
Independent	Lesley Way*	1,440	59.4	
Conservative	Paul Mercer	852	35.2	
Conservative	Sylvia Smith	749	30.9	
Conservative	San Singh	731	30.2	
Labour	Ruth Roberts	528	21.8	
Turnout		2,646	39.2	
Registered electors		6,751		
Independent win (new boundaries)				
Independent win (new boundaries)				
Independent win (new boundaries)				

=== Lutterell ===
Lutterell
Party	Candidate	Votes	%	±%
Conservative	Phill Matthews	425	39.3	
Green	Benjamin Gray*	334	30.9	
Labour	Naz Begum*	322	29.8	
Turnout		1,088	44.9	
Registered electors		2,422		
Conservative win (new boundaries)				

=== Musters ===
Musters
Party	Candidate	Votes	%	±%
Labour	Dora Polenta	796	43.4	
Liberal Democrats	Sara Dellar	732	39.9	
Labour	Roger Smith	711	38.8	
Liberal Democrats	Vicky Price*	697	38.0	
Conservative	Rachel Godkin	386	21.1	
Conservative	Ruta Furmonaviciene	345	18.8	
Turnout		1,894	45.8	
Registered electors		4,134		
Labour win (new boundaries)				
Liberal Democrats win (new boundaries)				

=== Neville & Langar ===
Neville & Langar
Party	Candidate	Votes	%	±%
Conservative	Tina Combellack*	609	61.6	
Independent	Margaret Irving	380	38.4	
Turnout		1,022	40.8	
Registered electors		2,503		
Conservative win (new boundaries)				

=== Newton ===
Newton
Party	Candidate	Votes	%	±%
Conservative	Debbie Soloman	372	58.0	
Labour	Paul Barton	157	24.5	
Green	Rhiana Lakin	112	17.5	
Turnout		639	40.9	
Registered electors		1,563		
Conservative win (new boundaries)				

=== Radcliffe on Trent ===
Radcliffe on Trent
Party	Candidate	Votes	%	±%
Conservative	Roger Upton*	1,346	48.8	
Conservative	Abby Brennan*	1,342	48.6	
Conservative	Jonathan Clarke	1,167	42.3	
Labour	Alice Tomlinson	1,150	41.7	
Labour	Martin Culshaw	1,104	40.0	
Labour	Paul Rotherham	956	34.7	
Green	Jane Fulford	470	17.0	
Green	Kim Kupper	325	11.8	
Liberal Democrats	Adam Witko	310	11.2	
Reform	Lance Concannon	107	3.9	
Turnout		2,922	47.6	
Registered electors		6,135		
Conservative win (new boundaries)				
Conservative win (new boundaries)				
Conservative win (new boundaries)				

=== Ruddington ===
Ruddington
Party	Candidate	Votes	%	±%
Labour	Jen Walker*	1,578	64.3	
Labour	Mike Gaunt*	1,531	62.4	
Labour	Graham Fletcher	1,427	58.2	
Conservative	Andrew Kemp	850	34.6	
Conservative	Gary Dickman*	821	33.5	
Conservative	Ben Atack	776	31.6	
Green	Andrew Nicholson-Cole	377	15.4	
Turnout		2,611	43.1	
Registered electors		6,058		
Labour win (new boundaries)				
Labour win (new boundaries)				
Labour win (new boundaries)				

=== Soar Valley ===
Soar Valley
Party	Candidate	Votes	%	±%
Conservative	Matt Barney*	428	54.7	
Rushcliffe Ind.	Stuart Matthews	211	27.0	
Liberal Democrats	David Wright	143	18.3	
Turnout		786	44.6	
Registered electors		1,761		
Conservative win (new boundaries)				

=== Tollerton ===
Tollerton
Party	Candidate	Votes	%	±%
Conservative	Debbie Mason*	395	54.4	
Labour	Annette Beaumont	245	33.7	
Green	Peter Jones	65	9.0	
Rushcliffe Ind.	Natascha Birch	21	2.9	
Turnout		729	48.1	
Registered electors		1,516		
Conservative win (new boundaries)				

=== Trent Bridge ===
Trent Bridge
Party	Candidate	Votes	%	±%
Labour	Liz Plant	541	64.7	
Conservative	Paul Coe	186	22.2	
Green	Timothy Baker	109	13.0	
Turnout		837	35.5	
Registered electors		2,357		
Labour win (new boundaries)				
