= 2019 Rushcliffe Borough Council election =

2019 UK local government election

- 2 May 2019

All 44 seats to Rushcliffe Borough Council 23 seats needed for a majority

| | First party | Second party | Third party |
|---|---|---|---|
| Party | Conservative | Labour | Liberal Democrats |
| Last election | 34 seats, 48.6% | 4 seats, 26.8% | 2 seats, 4.4$ |
| Seats won | 29 | 7 | 3 |
| Seat change | ▼5 | ▲3 | ▲1 |
| Popular vote | 29,938 | 18,137 | 8,896 |
| Percentage | 43.3% | 26.2% | 12.9% |
| Swing | ▼5.3% | ▼0.6% | ▲8.5% |
| | Fourth party | Fifth party |
| Party | Independent | Green |
| Last election | 2 seats, 6.5% | 2 seats, 8.0% |
| Seats won | 3 | 2 |
| Seat change | ▲1 | Steady |
| Popular vote | 5,038 | 6,468 |
| Percentage | 7.3% | 9.4% |
| Swing | ▲0.8% | ▲1.4% |
- Map of the results
Council control before election
Conservative
Council control after election
Conservative

The 2019 Rushcliffe Borough Council election took place on 2 May 2019 to elect members of the Rushcliffe Borough Council in England. It was held on the same day as other local elections, as well as parish council elections in the borough.

== Summary ==
=== Election result ===
2019 Rushcliffe Borough Council election
| Party | Candidates | Seats | Gains | Losses | Net gain/loss | Seats % | Votes % | Votes | +/− |
|---|---|---|---|---|---|---|---|---|---|
| Conservative | 44 | 29 | 2 | 7 | ▼5 | 65.9 | 43.3 | 29,938 | –5.3 |
| Labour | 40 | 7 | 4 | 1 | ▲3 | 15.9 | 26.2 | 18,137 | –0.6 |
| Liberal Democrats | 21 | 3 | 1 | 0 | ▲1 | 6.8 | 12.9 | 8,896 | +8.5 |
| Independent | 7 | 3 | 3 | 2 | ▲1 | 6.8 | 7.3 | 5,038 | +0.8 |
| Green | 10 | 2 | 0 | 0 | Steady | 4.5 | 9.4 | 6,468 | +1.4 |
| UKIP | 2 | 0 | 0 | 0 | Steady | 0.0 | 0.9 | 639 | –4.8 |

== Ward results ==
=== Abbey ===
Abbey
| Party | Candidate | Votes | % | ±% |
|---|---|---|---|---|
| Conservative | Brian Buschman | 857 | 41.5 | |
| Labour | Penny Gowland | 857 | 41.5 | |
| Conservative | Darius Furmonavicius | 852 | 41.3 | |
| Labour | Tony Smith | 809 | 39.2 | |
| Liberal Democrats | Keith Jamieson | 469 | 22.7 | |
| Turnout | | 2,087 | | |
| Conservative hold | | | | |
| Labour gain from Conservative | | | | |

=== Bingham East ===
Bingham East
| Party | Candidate | Votes | % | ±% |
|---|---|---|---|---|
| Liberal Democrats | Lizzie Howitt | 632 | 43.3 | |
| Conservative | Gareth Williams | 605 | 41.4 | |
| Conservative | Andrew Shelton | 604 | 41.3 | |
| Liberal Democrats | John Lewis | 527 | 36.1 | |
| Labour | Hedley Malloch | 260 | 17.8 | |
| Turnout | | 1,502 | | |
| Liberal Democrats gain from Independent | | | | |
| Conservative gain from Independent | | | | |

=== Bingham West ===
Bingham West
| Party | Candidate | Votes | % | ±% |
|---|---|---|---|---|
| Conservative | John Stockwood | 466 | 51.2 | |
| Conservative | Francis Purdue-Horan | 457 | 50.2 | |
| Labour | Tony Wallace | 433 | 47.6 | |
| Turnout | | 956 | | |
| Conservative hold | | | | |
| Conservative hold | | | | |

=== Bunny ===
Bunny
| Party | Candidate | Votes | % | ±% |
|---|---|---|---|---|
| Conservative | Reg Adair | 456 | 48.1 | |
| Independent | Edward Birch | 367 | 38.7 | |
| Labour | Chris Burns | 125 | 13.2 | |
| Majority | | | | |
| Turnout | | 956 | | |
| Conservative hold | | Swing | | |

=== Compton Acres ===
Compton Acres
| Party | Candidate | Votes | % | ±% |
|---|---|---|---|---|
| Conservative | Douglas Wheeler | 1,108 | 62.6 | |
| Conservative | Alan Phillips | 1,051 | 59.4 | |
| Labour | Ena Stansfield | 418 | 23.6 | |
| Liberal Democrats | Juliette Khan | 337 | 19.0 | |
| Labour | Ged Talty | 316 | 17.9 | |
| Turnout | | 1,794 | | |
| Conservative hold | | | | |
| Conservative hold | | | | |

=== Cotgrave ===
Cotgrave
| Party | Candidate | Votes | % | ±% |
|---|---|---|---|---|
| Conservative | Richard Butler | 911 | 48.5 | |
| Conservative | Christine Jeffreys | 735 | 39.1 | |
| Conservative | Leo Healy | 682 | 36.3 | |
| Labour | Hayley Chewings | 628 | 33.4 | |
| Labour | Drew Wilkie | 596 | 31.7 | |
| Labour | Keir Chewings | 594 | 31.6 | |
| Independent | Helena Brumpton | 399 | 21.2 | |
| UKIP | Adrian Walters | 324 | 17.2 | |
| Turnout | | 1,889 | | |
| Conservative hold | | | | |
| Conservative hold | | | | |
| Conservative gain from Labour | | | | |

=== Cranmer ===
Cranmer
| Party | Candidate | Votes | % | ±% |
|---|---|---|---|---|
| Conservative | Maureen Stockwood | 442 | 53.7 | |
| Labour | Christopher Grocock | 381 | 46.3 | |
| Majority | | | | |
| Turnout | | 849 | | |
| Conservative hold | | Swing | | |

=== Cropwell ===
Cropwell
| Party | Candidate | Votes | % | ±% |
|---|---|---|---|---|
| Conservative | Gordon Moore | 499 | 67.3 | |
| Labour | Jim Robinson | 242 | 32.7 | |
| Majority | | | | |
| Turnout | | 767 | | |
| Conservative hold | | Swing | | |

=== East Bridgford ===
East Bridgford
| Party | Candidate | Votes | % | ±% |
|---|---|---|---|---|
| Conservative | David Simms | 613 | 69.9 | |
| Labour | Martin O'Shaughnessy | 264 | 30.1 | |
| Majority | | | | |
| Turnout | | 901 | | |
| Conservative hold | | Swing | | |

=== Edwalton ===
Edwalton
| Party | Candidate | Votes | % | ±% |
|---|---|---|---|---|
| Conservative | Kevin Beardsall | 679 | 51.1 | |
| Conservative | Simon Robinson | 672 | 50.6 | |
| Labour | Jake Jackson | 263 | 19.8 | |
| Liberal Democrats | David Turner | 255 | 19.2 | |
| Green | Ian Whitehead | 215 | 16.2 | |
| Labour | Peter Knott | 211 | 15.9 | |
| Liberal Democrats | Giles Major | 203 | 15.3 | |
| Turnout | | 1,342 | | |
| Conservative hold | | | | |
| Conservative hold | | | | |

=== Gamston North ===
Gamston North
| Party | Candidate | Votes | % | ±% |
|---|---|---|---|---|
| Conservative | Jonathan Wheeler | 413 | 58.6 | |
| Labour | Adrian Harms | 167 | 23.7 | |
| Liberal Democrats | Jayne Lingard | 125 | 17.7 | |
| Majority | | | | |
| Turnout | | 723 | | |
| Conservative hold | | Swing | | |

=== Gamston South ===
Gamston South
| Party | Candidate | Votes | % | ±% |
|---|---|---|---|---|
| Conservative | Davinder Virdi | 420 | 51.9 | |
| Labour | Stef Elliott | 288 | 35.6 | |
| Liberal Democrats | Phil Leichauer | 101 | 12.5 | |
| Majority | | | | |
| Turnout | | 818 | | |
| Conservative hold | | Swing | | |

=== Gotham ===
Gotham
| Party | Candidate | Votes | % | ±% |
|---|---|---|---|---|
| Conservative | Rex Walker | 540 | 59.7 | |
| Labour | Lewis McAuley | 364 | 40.3 | |
| Majority | | | | |
| Turnout | | 931 | | |
| Conservative hold | | Swing | | |

=== Keyworth and Wolds ===
Keyworth and Wolds
| Party | Candidate | Votes | % | ±% |
|---|---|---|---|---|
| Conservative | John Cottee | 1,688 | 54.6 | |
| Conservative | Rob Inglis | 1,352 | 43.7 | |
| Conservative | Andy Edyvean | 1,098 | 35.5 | |
| Independent | Shelley Millband | 890 | 28.8 | |
| Liberal Democrats | Linda Abbey | 875 | 28.3 | |
| Liberal Democrats | Nick Riley | 588 | 19.0 | |
| Liberal Democrats | Andy Wood | 476 | 15.4 | |
| Labour | Dave Clarke | 386 | 12.5 | |
| Labour | Kev Lowe | 327 | 10.6 | |
| Labour | Neil Breward | 321 | 10.4 | |
| UKIP | David King | 315 | 10.2 | |
| Turnout | | 3,114 | | |
| Conservative hold | | | | |
| Conservative hold | | | | |
| Conservative hold | | | | |

=== Lady Bay ===
Lady Bay
| Party | Candidate | Votes | % | ±% |
|---|---|---|---|---|
| Green | Sue Mallender | 1,345 | 67.6 | |
| Green | George Mallender | 1,277 | 64.2 | |
| Labour | Julie Chaplain | 481 | 24.2 | |
| Labour | Marc Gibson | 345 | 17.3 | |
| Conservative | Jamie Tennant | 219 | 11.0 | |
| Conservative | Barry Stockton | 206 | 10.4 | |
| Turnout | | 2,005 | | |
| Green hold | | | | |
| Green hold | | | | |

=== Leake ===
Leake
| Party | Candidate | Votes | % | ±% |
|---|---|---|---|---|
| Independent | Carys Thomas | 1,125 | 41.9 | |
| Independent | Kevin Shaw | 1,065 | 39.7 | |
| Independent | Lesley Way | 987 | 36.8 | |
| Conservative | Simon Ackroyd | 837 | 31.2 | |
| Conservative | John Thurman | 830 | 30.9 | |
| Conservative | Nicki Dalton | 700 | 26.1 | |
| Labour | Pippa Connerton | 390 | 14.5 | |
| Labour | Gary Pollard | 366 | 13.6 | |
| Labour | Tom Willoughby | 285 | 10.6 | |
| Liberal Democrats | Jason Billin | 266 | 9.9 | |
| Green | Stephen Perriman | 248 | 9.2 | |
| Liberal Democrats | David Wright | 213 | 7.9 | |
| Liberal Democrats | Patrick Cole | 203 | 7.6 | |
| Turnout | | 2,709 | | |
| Independent gain from Conservative | | | | |
| Independent gain from Conservative | | | | |
| Independent gain from Conservative | | | | |

=== Lutterell ===
Lutterell
| Party | Candidate | Votes | % | ±% |
|---|---|---|---|---|
| Labour | Benjamin Gray | 721 | 40.2 | |
| Labour | Naz Begum | 707 | 39.4 | |
| Conservative | Stephen Duckworth | 645 | 35.9 | |
| Conservative | Stuart Ellis | 598 | 33.3 | |
| Green | William Richardson | 377 | 21.0 | |
| Liberal Democrats | John Edwards | 349 | 19.4 | |
| Turnout | | 1,806 | | |
| Labour hold | | | | |
| Labour gain from Conservative | | | | |

=== Musters ===
Musters
| Party | Candidate | Votes | % | ±% |
|---|---|---|---|---|
| Liberal Democrats | Rod Jones | 917 | 58.1 | |
| Liberal Democrats | Annie Major | 873 | 55.3 | |
| Conservative | Emma Mclean | 379 | 24.0 | |
| Labour | Jane Tapp | 320 | 20.3 | |
| Conservative | Janet Milbourn | 311 | 19.7 | |
| Labour | Brian Robinson | 278 | 17.6 | |
| Turnout | | 1,593 | | |
| Liberal Democrats hold | | | | |
| Liberal Democrats hold | | | | |

=== Nevile and Langar ===
Nevile and Langar
| Party | Candidate | Votes | % | ±% |
|---|---|---|---|---|
| Conservative | Tina Combellack | Unopposed | | |
| Majority | | | | |
| Turnout | | | | |
| Conservative hold | | Swing | | |

=== Radcliffe on Trent ===
Radcliffe on Trent
| Party | Candidate | Votes | % | ±% |
|---|---|---|---|---|
| Conservative | Roger Upton | 1,416 | 51.7 | |
| Conservative | Abby Brannan | 1,253 | 45.7 | |
| Conservative | Jonathan Clarke | 1,167 | 42.6 | |
| Green | Helga Wills | 763 | 27.8 | |
| Labour | Ricky Coxon | 674 | 24.6 | |
| Labour | Paul Barton | 617 | 22.5 | |
| Labour | Ronne Randall | 592 | 21.6 | |
| Liberal Democrats | Maggie Clamp | 567 | 20.7 | |
| Liberal Democrats | David Woodcock | 443 | 16.2 | |
| Turnout | | 2,771 | | |
| Conservative hold | | | | |
| Conservative hold | | | | |
| Conservative hold | | | | |

=== Ruddington ===
Ruddington
| Party | Candidate | Votes | % | ±% |
|---|---|---|---|---|
| Labour | Jen Walker | 857 | 37.0 | |
| Labour | Mike Gaunt | 834 | 36.0 | |
| Conservative | Gary Dickman | 825 | 35.6 | |
| Conservative | Martin Buckle | 793 | 34.3 | |
| Conservative | Sibby Buckle | 750 | 32.4 | |
| Green | Matthew Sisson | 655 | 28.3 | |
| Labour | Gill Aldridge | 639 | 27.6 | |
| Green | Ian Wilson | 606 | 26.2 | |
| Green | Chandler Wilson | 576 | 24.9 | |
| Turnout | | 2,345 | | |
| Labour gain from Conservative | | | | |
| Labour gain from Conservative | | | | |
| Conservative hold | | | | |

=== Sutton Bonington ===
Sutton Bonington
| Party | Candidate | Votes | % | ±% |
|---|---|---|---|---|
| Conservative | Ron Hetherington | 257 | 45.1 | |
| Labour | Kieran Hopewell | 160 | 28.1 | |
| Liberal Democrats | Mike Wright | 153 | 26.8 | |
| Majority | | | | |
| Turnout | | 599 | | |
| Conservative hold | | Swing | | |

=== Thoroton ===
Thoroton
| Party | Candidate | Votes | % | ±% |
|---|---|---|---|---|
| Conservative | Sarah Bailey | Unopposed | | |
| Majority | | | | |
| Turnout | | | | |
| Conservative hold | | Swing | | |

=== Tollerton ===
Tollerton
| Party | Candidate | Votes | % | ±% |
|---|---|---|---|---|
| Conservative | Debbie Mason | 687 | 76.2 | |
| Labour | Mick Chewings | 215 | 23.8 | |
| Majority | | | | |
| Turnout | | 917 | | |
| Conservative hold | | Swing | | |

=== Trent Bridge ===
Trent Bridge
| Party | Candidate | Votes | % | ±% |
|---|---|---|---|---|
| Labour | Jenny Murray | 736 | 43.4 | |
| Labour | Bal Bansal | 670 | 39.6 | |
| Conservative | Paul Abel | 494 | 29.2 | |
| Green | Timothy Baker | 406 | 24.0 | |
| Conservative | Nick Henson-Aslam | 371 | 21.9 | |
| Liberal Democrats | Vicky Price | 324 | 19.1 | |
| Independent | Claire Elliott | 205 | 12.1 | |
| Turnout | | 1,699 | | |
| Labour hold | | | | |
| Labour hold | | | | |

== By-elections ==
=== Musters ===
Musters: 7 October 2021
| Party | Candidate | Votes | % | ±% |
|---|---|---|---|---|
| Liberal Democrats | Vicky Price | 557 | 45.3 | −11.5 |
| Labour | Julie Chaplain | 353 | 28.7 | +8.9 |
| Conservative | Paul Coe | 320 | 26.0 | +2.6 |
| Majority | | 204 | 16.6 | |
| Turnout | | 1,231 | 36.0 | |
| Liberal Democrats hold | | Swing | ▼10.2 | |
