= Stanford Hall, Nottinghamshire =

Listed building in Nottinghamshire, England

Stanford Hall
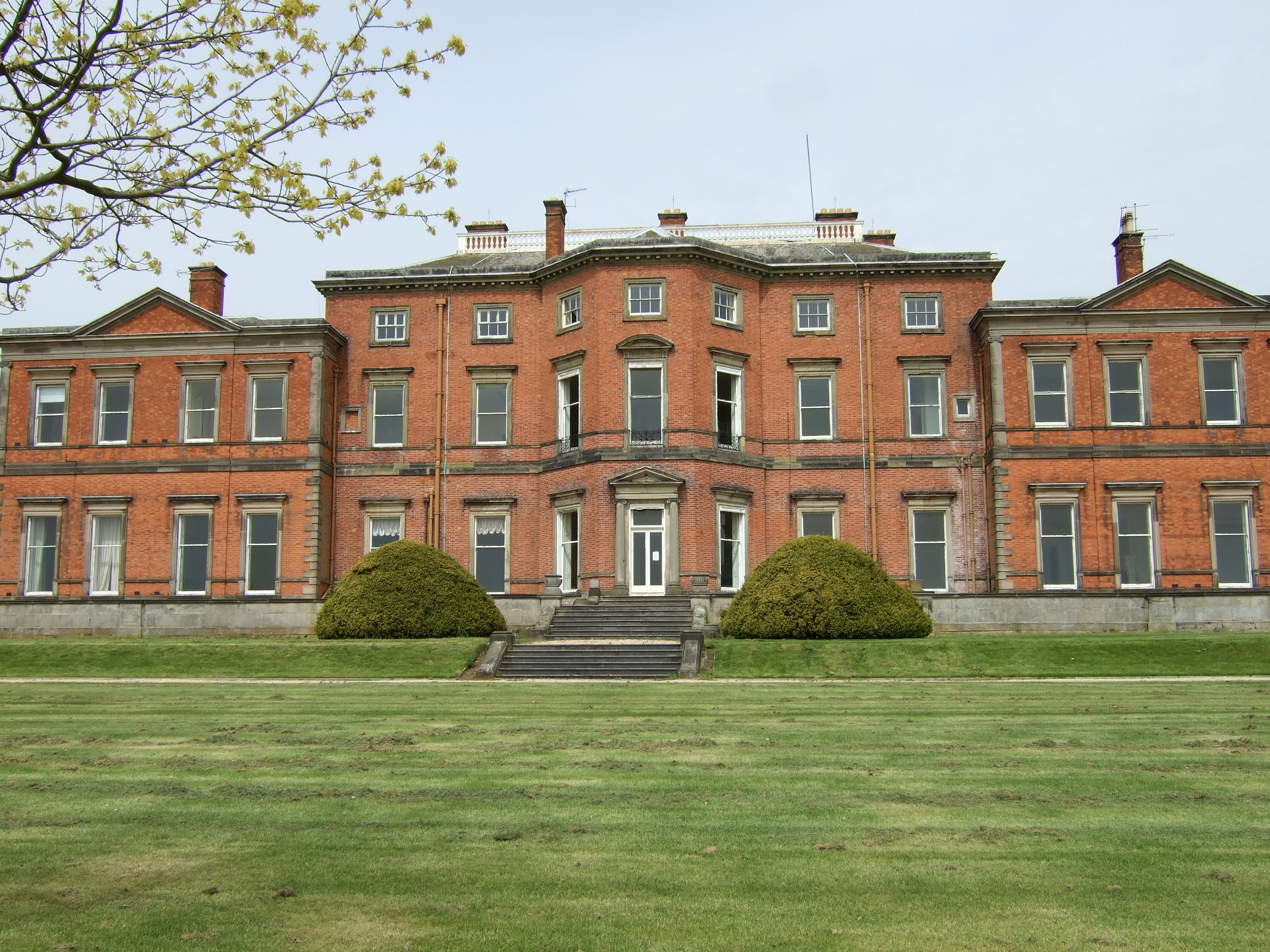
- Stanford Hall

- Location within Nottinghamshire

General information
- Location: Stanford on Soar, Nottinghamshire, England
- Coordinates: 52°48′34.00″N 1°10′21.25″W
- Year built: 1771–74

Design and construction
- Architect: William Anderson of Loughborough

Listed Building – Grade II*
- Official name: Stanford Hall
- Designated: 14 May 1952
- Reference no.: 1260097

Stanford Hall is a Grade II* listed 18th-century English country house in Stanford on Soar, Nottinghamshire, just north of Loughborough. Previously known as the Defence and National Rehabilitation Centre (DNRC), following new building developments from 2023 for the National Rehabilitation Centre associated with Nottingham University Hospitals NHS Trust, the general complex is known as Stanford Hall Rehabilitation Estate (SHRE).

== History ==
The manor of Stanford, complete with its stone manor house, was sold in 1661 by the Raynes family to a London alderman, Thomas Lewes (died c. 1702). He was succeeded by his grandson Francis Lewis (c. 1692–1744), who was an MP and High Sheriff of Nottinghamshire for 1713–14. The estate then passed to the fourth and last generation of Leweses, Charles Lewes, who died with no heir. After him it passed by marriage to the Dashwood family, of whom the first to occupy the property was Charles Vere Dashwood. He commissioned William Anderson of Loughborough to rebuild the house in brick between 1771 and 1774. The house is constructed in red brick with ashlar dressings, with a hipped slate roof topped with a painted balustrade, built in two storeys with a seven-bay frontage. It then descended in the Dashwood family to Charles Lewes Dashwood, who sold it in 1887 to Richard Ratcliff, a brewer from Burton-on-Trent.

Ratcliff employed the local architect W. H. Fletcher to make substantial changes to the house, which included building new two-storey wings flanking the main block and a new service wing. The house passed on his death in 1898 to his son, also Richard, By 1928 the owner was Richard Snr.'s granddaughter Kathleen, who had married Lawrence Kimball.

=== Sir Julien Cahn ===
In 1928 Sir Julien Cahn purchased the hall from the Kimballs for £70,000 (equivalent to £3,802,102 as of 2025).

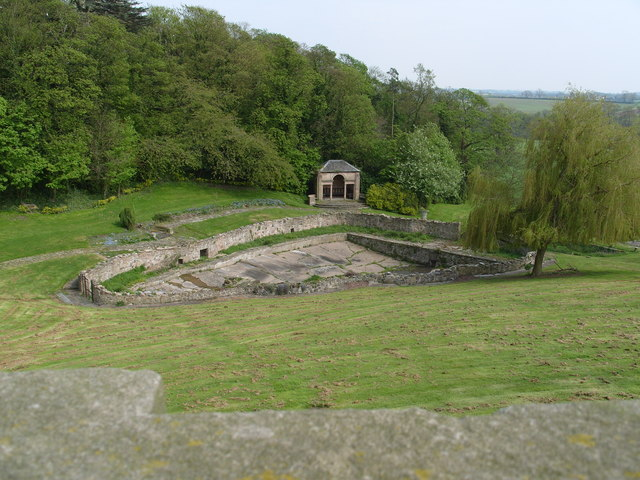
The sea lion pool at Stanford Hall

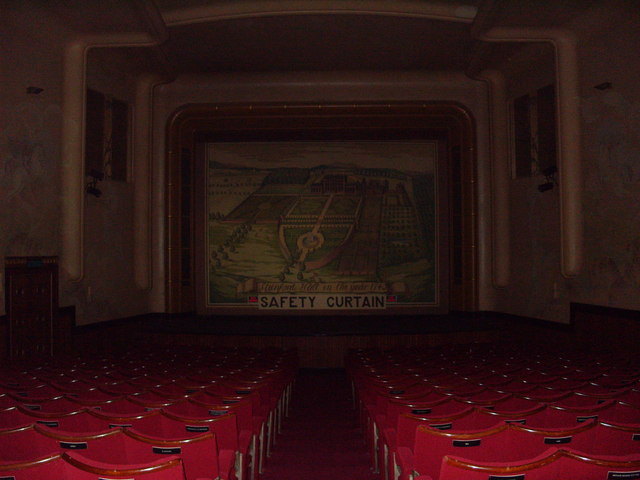
The theatre at Stanford Hall

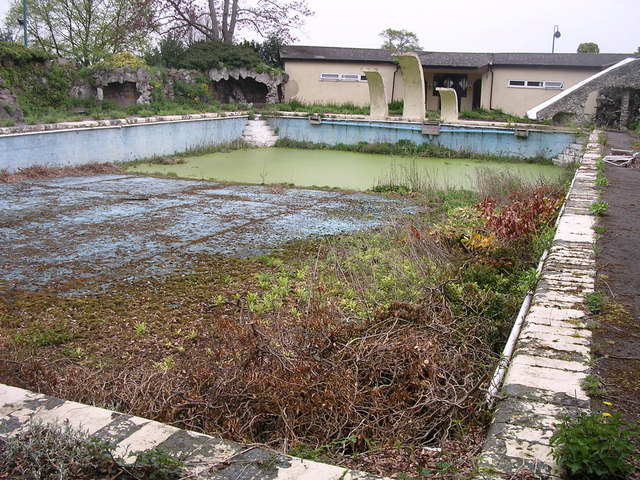
The remains of the lido at Stanford Hall

Here Cahn commissioned the architect Percy Richard Morley Horder to build a cricket pitch, nine-hole golf course, bowling green, large trout lake, sea lion pool, penguin pool, lido, tennis court and thatched pavilion, an outdoor heated swimming pool with coral walls holding fountains and artificial caves added to the wooded parkland and formal gardens.

The largest addition was a theatre designed by Cecil Aubrey Masey built in 1937 for £73,000 (equivalent to £4,299,451 as of 2025) which seated 352 people. The walls were decorated with murals by Beatrice MacDermott. It comprised a raked auditorium, orchestra pit and Wurlitzer organ which can be raised and lowered during performances. The organ was made for Théâtre de la Madeleine in Paris. It was purchased by Cahn for £20,000 and enlarged when it was installed.

The house was extensively remodelled over the next decade under the direction of Sir Charles Allom, under his own company White Allom Ltd. Together with Queen Mary, Allom advised on the redecoration of Buckingham Palace and had many multi-millionaire clients, such as Henry Clay Frick, whose Fifth Avenue town house now houses the Frick Collection.

Stanford Hall retains most of the interior structures and installations of Cahn's day, though most of the art moderne marble bathrooms were removed in the 1960s. The furnishings selected with Allom were of the highest quality. The inclusion of many fine antiques, and the theming of the rooms by date and country gave the impression of a house that had evolved over time. By 1940 it was one of the finest and most luxurious of small country houses in the United Kingdom. Cahn died in the White Allom panelled library in 1944. In 1939 he had lent part of the house to be used for the rehabilitation of wounded soldiers.

=== Bomber crash ===
In 1941 a Blenheim bomber crashed onto the cricket pitch in foggy conditions; no one died in the incident.

=== Co-operative College 1945–2001 ===
The hall was purchased for £54,000 in 1945 (equivalent to £2,015,072 as of 2025), by the Co-operative Union to house its Co-operative College.

In 1952 Stanford Hall was designated a Grade II* listed building.

=== Raynsway Properties 2001–2007 ===
The Co-operative College relocated to Holyoake House in Manchester in 2001 and sold Stanford Hall to Raynsway Properties, which planned to convert it into luxury apartments and also build a 147-bedroom hotel in the grounds.

=== Chek Whyte 2007–2011 ===
In March 2007, the hall was sold by Leicester-based Raynsway Properties for £6.25 million to Chek Whyte Industries, which planned to convert it and built a £60 million retirement village within the grounds. In March 2009, the grounds hosted the English schools' cross-country championships. In September 2009, after the fall in property prices because of the 2008 financial crisis, Chek Whyte submitted proposals for an individual voluntary arrangement (IVA), which were later withdrawn.

=== Defence and National Rehabilitation Centre (DNRC) ===
In October 2011, the hall and its grounds were purchased on behalf of Gerald Grosvenor, 6th Duke of Westminster, as a potential site for a 'Defence and National Rehabilitation Centre' (DNRC). The Duke, who had served in the Territorial Army since the age of 21 and was committed to supporting military welfare, led a major fundraising campaign for the proposed new establishment.

On 13 June 2013, Rushcliffe Borough Council "resolved to grant planning permission... for the redevelopment of the Stanford Hall estate as the potential site for the DNRC". On 10 July 2014, HM Government announced that it had granted approval for the establishment of the DNRC at Stanford Hall. Work started on the £300 million three-year project on 24 August 2015.

Hugh Grosvenor, 7th Duke of Westminster handed over the DNRC facility to the nation at a gifting ceremony held on the estate on 21 June 2018. The centre was received by the then Prime Minister, Theresa May, in the presence of the Duke of Cambridge.

=== National Rehabilitation Centre ===
The centre is a £105 million new building offering 70 beds, as a specialist rehabilitation centre for NHS patients who have suffered life-altering illness or injury. To be overseen by Nottingham Hospitals staff, it was started in 2023, initially with expectation of completion in late 2025. Delays due to operational problems and safety tests with the water systems were experienced, meaning the keys were handed over in late July 2026, with expectation of first patients in September.

The centre is part of the UK government's hospital expansion programme review, implemented by Wes Streeting, then Health Secretary, under Keir Starmer, then Prime Minister, considered for priority completion as being under construction before the 2024 general election. Until the centre is fully operational, patients have been cared for at Linden Lodge, part of City Hospital and the C24 Ward at Queen's Medical Centre, both in Nottingham.

== See also ==
- Grade II* listed buildings in Nottinghamshire
- Listed buildings in Stanford on Soar
