= 2015 Rushcliffe Borough Council election =

Elections in England

Results of the 2015 Rushcliffe Borough Council election

The 2015 Rushcliffe Borough Council election took place on 7 May 2015 to elect members of the Rushcliffe Borough Council in England. It was held on the same day as other local elections.

== Overall election results ==
=== Rushcliffe Borough Council (Summary of Overall Results) ===
Rushcliffe Borough 2015 Election Results (44 Wards having been reduced from 50)
Party	Seats	Gains	Losses	Net gain/loss	Seats %	Votes %	Votes	+/−
Conservative	34			▼2				
Labour	4			▼1				
Liberal Democrats	2	0	4	▼4				
Green	2	0	0	Steady				
Independent	2			▲1				
UKIP	0			Steady				

== Rushcliffe Borough Council - Results by Ward ==
=== Abbey ===
Abbey (2 seats)
Party	Candidate	Votes	%
Conservative	Brian Rudolf Buschman (E)	1,210	20.54
Conservative	Angela Mary Dickinson (E)	1,182	20.07
Labour	John Robert Bannister	1,033	17.54
Labour	Sandra Jean Coker	948	16.10
Green	David Wilson	439	7.45
Liberal Democrats	John Campbell Banks	403	6.84
Green	David Carl Griffin	392	6.66
UKIP	Anthony John Burton	283	4.80
Turnout		5890	78.11

=== Bingham East ===
Bingham East (2 seats)
Party	Candidate	Votes	%
Independent	George Davidson (E)	1,121	22.47
Independent	Susan Jennifer Hull (E)	994	19.93
Conservative	Andrew Charles Shelton	989	19.83
Conservative	Maureen Stockwood	913	18.30
Labour	David Charles Holmes	602	12.07
Green	Karen Victoria Harris	369	7.40
Turnout		4988	74.89

=== Bingham West ===
Bingham West (2 seats)
Party	Candidate	Votes	%
Conservative	Francis Anthoney Purdue-Horan (E)	994	24.83
Conservative	John Anthony Stockwood (E)	956	23.88
Labour	Ailish Maria D'Arcy	666	16.64
Independent	Tracey Lindsay Kerry	646	16.14
Independent	Alan Robert Harvey	451	15.3
Green	Nicholas Lee Wilson	290	7.24
Turnout		4003	65.78

=== Bunny ===
Bunny (1 seat)
Party	Candidate	Votes	%
Conservative	Reginald Aaron Adair (E)	1,082	68.79
Labour	Jean Stansfield	315	20.03
UKIP	Daniel Roy Stowell	176	11.19
Turnout		1573	81.10

=== Compton Acres ===
Compton Acres (2 seats)
Party	Candidate	Votes	%
Conservative	Douglas Gordon Anthony Wheeler (E)	1,464	28.89
Conservative	Alan Phillips (E)	1,470	29.01
Labour	Paul John Fallon	784	15.47
Labour	Ena Stansfield	698	13.77
Liberal Democrats	Keith Michael Jamieson	353	6.97
UKIP	Andrew Neil Pilkington	299	5.90
Turnout		5068	74.48

=== Cotgrave ===
Cotgrave (3 seats)
Party	Candidate	Votes	%
Conservative	Richard Langton Butler (E)	1,502	18.13
Conservative	Christine Ena May Jeffreys (E)	1,200	14.48
Labour	Hayley Ann Chewings (E)	1,144	13.81
Conservative	Vance Clive Wood	1,062	12.82
Labour	Andrew Robert Wilkie	1,059	12.78
Labour	Keir Ronald Chewings	1,038	12.53
UKIP	Patricia Ann Wolfe	778	9.93
Green	Helena Jayne Brumpton	503	6.07
Turnout		8286	63.48

=== Cranmer ===
Cranmer (1 seat)
Party	Candidate	Votes	%
Conservative	Martin William Suthers (E)	995	70.82
Labour	Christopher Joseph Grocock	410	29.18
Turnout		1405	76.40

=== Cropwell ===
Cropwell (1 seat)
Party	Candidate	Votes	%
Conservative	Gordon Sidney Moore (E)	1,120	72.21
Labour	Peter Cousins	431	27.79
Turnout		1551	76.37

=== East Bridgford ===
East Bridgford (1 seat)
Party	Candidate	Votes	%
Conservative	Nigel Cort Lawrence (E)	1,273	76.50
Labour	Stephen Hugh Collins	391	23.50
Turnout		1664	72.80

=== Edwalton ===
Edwalton (2 seats)
Party	Candidate	Votes	%
Conservative	Simon James Robinson (E)	1,039	26.30
Conservative	Kevin Peter Beardsall (E)	987	24.98
Labour	Margaret Walsh	403	10.20
Labour	Susan Kathryn Tiplady	386	9.77
Liberal Democrats	David Charles Turner	297	7.52
Green	Yasmin Jane Baddley	293	7.42
Green	Jerome Tobias Baddley	285	7.21
UKIP	Cynthia Fidler	261	6.61
Turnout		3951	71.66

=== Gamston North ===
Gamston North (1 seat)
Party	Candidate	Votes	%
Conservative	Jonathan Gordon Wheeler (E)	795	56.87
Labour	Christine Mary Turner	437	31.26
UKIP	Ashley Sutton-Counter	166	11.87
Turnout		1398	72.39

=== Gamston South ===
Gamston South (1 seat)
Party	Candidate	Votes	%
Conservative	Leslie Barrie Cooper (E)	929	67.03
Labour	Richard Theodore Parry Crawley	457	32.97
Turnout		1386	74.43

=== Gotham ===
Gotham (1 seat)
Party	Candidate	Votes	%
Conservative	Stuart Christopher Matthews (E)	836	52.98
Labour	Gillian Beryl Aldridge	378	23.95
UKIP	Diana Sandra Patricia James	364	23.07
Turnout		1578	78.80

=== Keyworth and Wolds ===
Keyworth and Wolds (3 seats)
Party	Candidate	Votes	%
Conservative	John Elliot Cottee (E)	3,033	22.49
Conservative	Robert Alan Inglis (E)	2,311	17.14
Conservative	Andrew James Edyvean (E)	1,898	14.07
Liberal Democrats	Linda Jane Abbey	1,113	8.25
Labour	Robert David Crosby	907	6.72
Labour	Christopher John Kemp	888	6.58
Labour	Kevin Fitzgerald	863	6.40
Green	Neil Pinder	721	5.35
UKIP	David Alan King	717	5.32
UKIP	Heather Ward	518	3.83
UKIP	David John Lee	518	3.83
Turnout		13489	76.30

=== Lady Bay ===
Lady Bay (2 seats)
Party	Candidate	Votes	%
Green	Susan Elizabeth Mallender (E)	1,469	25.8
Green	George Richard Mallender (E)	1,453	25.52
Labour	James Stewart Berry	794	13.94
Conservative	Emma Louise Mclean	727	12.77
Labour	Terence leslie Morrell	641	11.26
Conservative	Janet Ann Milbourn	610	10.71
Turnout		5694	80.09

=== Leake ===
Leake (3 seats)
Party	Candidate	Votes	%
Conservative	Margaret Marie Males (E)	1,982	19.98
Conservative	John Edward Thurman (E)	1,857	18.72
Conservative	Ronald Hetherington (E)	1,768	17.82
Independent	Carys Mary Thomas	1,167	11.76
Labour	Kevin Peter Alan Lowe	809	8.16
Labour	Yvonne Pamela Thompson	754	7.60
Labour	George Michael Chewings	713	7.19
Turnout		9920	72.80

=== Lutterell ===
Lutterell (2 seats)
Party	Candidate	Votes	%
Labour	Martin James Edwards (E)	1,270	23.18
Conservative	Julie Donoghue (E)	1,206	23.18
Conservative	Sarah Paulina Bailey	1,148	22.07
Labour	Alan Richard Tiplady	1,111	21.36
Liberal Democrats	Juliette Khan	467	8.98
Turnout		5202	73.40

=== Musters ===
Musters (2 seats)
Party	Candidate	Votes	%
Liberal Democrats	Rodney Martin Jones (E)	1,209	23.77
Liberal Democrats	Karrar Ahmad Khan (E)	1,158	22.77
Conservative	Scott Carlton	814	16.00
Conservative	Adele Lauraine Lancaster	723	14.22
Labour	Christopher John Wrigley	596	11.72
Labour	Keith Wright	586	11.52
Turnout		5086	77.80

=== Nevile ===
Nevile (1 seat)
Party	Candidate	Votes	%
Conservative	Christine Maria Combellack (E)	1,324	76.84
Labour	Stephen Douglas Hill	399	23.16
Turnout		1723	78.90

=== Radcliffe On Trent ===
Radcliffe On Trent (3 seats)
Party	Candidate	Votes	%
Conservative	Roger Glyn Upton (E)	2,232	16.76
Conservative	Jonathan Neil Clarke (E)	1,934	14.53
Conservative	Jean Audrey Smith (E)	1,848	13.88
Independent	Georgia Moore	1,164	8.74
Independent	Melanie McKechnie	1,106	8.31
Labour	Philippa Jepson Culshaw	1,031	7.74
Labour	Tricia King	948	7.12
Independent	Graham Howard Budworth	946	7.11
Green	Helga Margret Wills	663	4.98
UKIP	Michael Charles Rockett	570	4.28
Turnout		13314	76.16

=== Ruddington ===
Ruddington (3 seats)
Party	Candidate	Votes	%
Conservative	Jean Eileen Greenwood (E)	1,898	17.94
Conservative	Martin Buckle (E)	1,789	16.91
Conservative	Ernest John Lungley (E)	1,536	14.52
Labour	Nigel Keith Boughton-Smith (E)	1,326	12.53
Labour	Robin Clive Crinage	1,119	10.58
Labour	Robert Henry Burlton	851	8.04
Green	Sandra Louise Lee	781	6.91
UKIP	Peter John Wolfe	704	6.65
Green	Michael Stephen McGowan	627	5.93
Turnout		10581	73.40

=== Stanford ===
Stanford (1 seat)
Party	Candidate	Votes	%
Conservative	Nigel Andrew Brown (E)	598	52.46
Labour	Peter Alan Brodie	253	22.19
Liberal Democrats	Peter Frederick McGowan	150	13.16
UKIP	Matthew Eric Faithfull	139	12.19
Turnout		1140	74.80

=== Tollerton ===
Tollerton (1 seat)
Party	Candidate	Votes	%
Conservative	Deborah Jane Mason (E)	1,134	83.2
Labour	Annette Kathleen Beaumont	414	26.74
Turnout		1548	79.98

=== Trent Bridge ===
Trent Bridge (2 seats)
Party	Candidate	Votes	%
Labour	Elizabeth Ann Plant (E)	1,253	22.18
Labour	Alistair MacInnes (E)	1,147	20.31
Conservative	Paul Frederick Coe	1,055	18.68
Conservative	Michael James Watkinson	945	16.73
Green	Timothy Andrew Baker	530	9.38
Green	Richard Stephen Lowe	482	8.53
UKIP	David Ian Holllas	236	4.18
Turnout		5648	71.90
