= Lutterell Ward =

Electoral ward in Nottinghamshire, England

Lutterell Ward is a Rushcliffe Borough Council ward located in West Bridgford, Nottinghamshire.

Lutterell Ward contains a single pub, called the Nottingham Knight, the Nottingham Knight is thought to have been the Lord of the Manor from 1315, Sir Robert Luteril.

Due to a boundary review in 2023 Lutterell Ward was reduced in size, losing the Asda supermarket and ending around the Rugby Road to Loughborough Road Junction.

== Schools ==
Lutterell Ward contains three schools:

- The West Bridgford School
- Greythorn Primary School
- Heymann Primary School

== Retail ==
Lutterell Ward did have place in British retail history as the location of the UK's first major out-of-town shopping development. In 1964, an American company called GEM opened a store on Loughborough Road. However, despite ambitious expansion plans, GEM's British operations were not a success, with only two other stores at Cross Gates, Leeds and Cliff Mill, Dundonald Street, Preston being opened. National concessionaires withdrew from the stores and, in 1966, the fledgling Asda superstore chain, whose then parent company was the Leeds, Yorkshire based dairy farming conglomerate, Associated Dairies, acquired a controlling interest in the GEM operations. The Loughborough Road site still has an Asda store, although it was replaced by a brand new and much larger store on land adjacent to the old site in 1999. The original building was demolished and is now part of the current Asda supercentre car park and petrol station area. (For a fuller history of the site and GEM, see Whysall (2005) in The International Review of Retail, Distribution and Consumer Research, 15(2), 111–124). Asda West Bridgford was the largest shop in the ward, but was moved into neighbouring Musters Ward. Due to this and a housing developer, Lutterell Ward now has no shops at all.

== Geography ==
The ward lies primarily on Wilford Hill. The adjoining wards are Trent Bridge Ward, Musters Ward, Compton Acres Ward and Ruddington Ward.

Lutterell Ward is home to the highest point in Nottinghamshire on the south bank of the Trent. From this point, Trent Valley is visible from as far as Newark-on-Trent.

== Housing developments ==
The majority of the housing in the ward consists of the Wilford Hill Estate, built on farmland in the late 1950s. The earliest properties were built after the Second World War by the local authority.

The South Nottingham College (formerly the Lutterell Secondary School) site was sold and demolished to make way for a housing development. The South Notts Hussars public house was demolished and a care home and houses were built in its place.

== Sport ==
Helen Richardson-Walsh's first club was West Bridgford Hockey Club located in Lutterell Ward. She then continued playing hockey and won a gold medal at the 2016 Rio Olympics.

== Politics ==
Lutterell Ward returned two Labour Party (UK) candidates at the 2019 elections, Naseem Begum and Benjamin Gray.
