= Borough of Rushcliffe =

Coordinates: 52.90°N 1.05°W

- Non-metropolitan district and borough
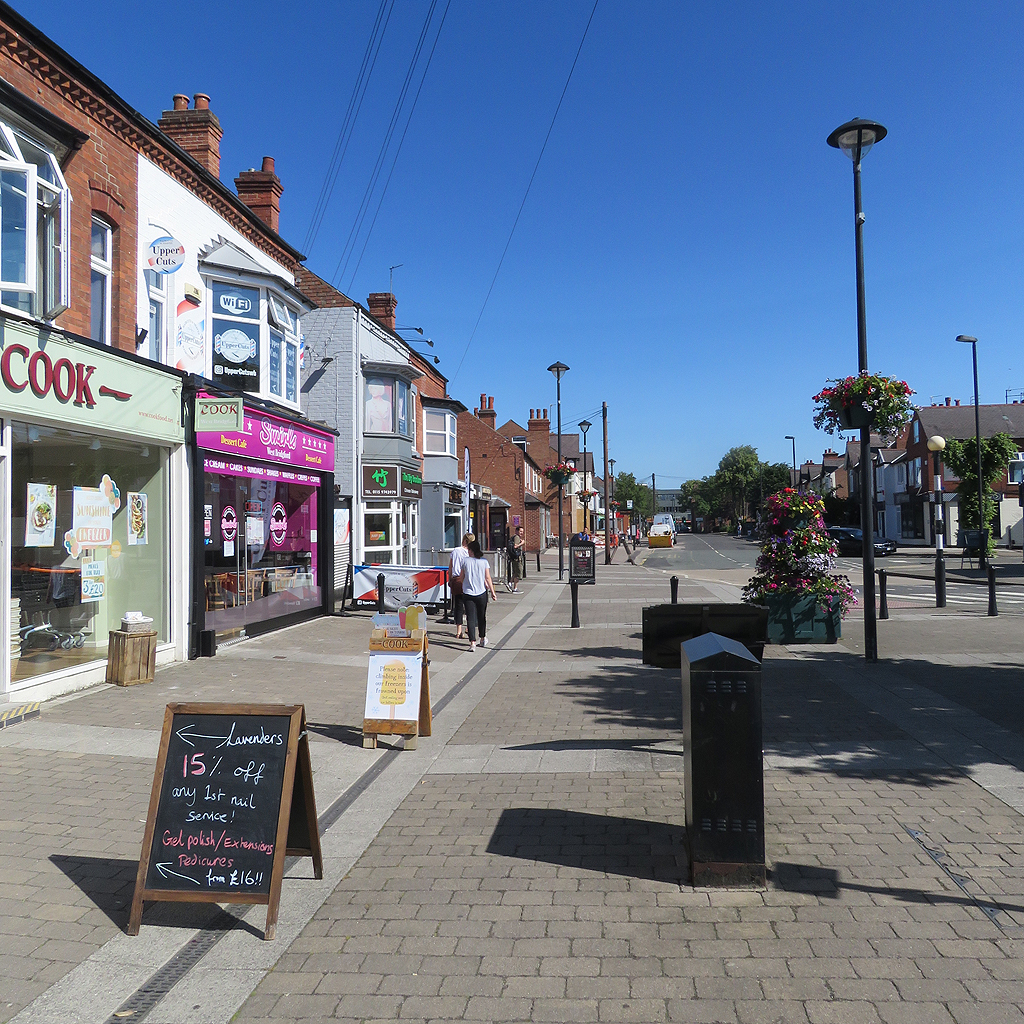
- West Bridgford, the largest settlement in the borough and the administrative centre

- Shown within Nottinghamshire
- Sovereign state: United Kingdom
- Constituent country: England
- Region: East Midlands
- Administrative county: Nottinghamshire
- Admin. HQ: West Bridgford

Government
  - Type: Rushcliffe Borough Council
  - MPs: James Naish; Robert Jenrick

Area
  - Total: 158 sq mi (409 km^{2})
  - Rank: 84th

Population (2024)
  - Total: 126,736
  - Rank: Ranked 194th
  - Density: 803/sq mi (310/km^{2})

Ethnicity (2021)
  - Ethnic groups: List: 89.7% White; 5.7% Asian; 2.8% Mixed; 0.9% Black; 0.9% other

Religion (2021)
  - Religion: List: 47.1% no religion; 46.7% Christianity; 3.8% other; 2.4% Islam
- Time zone: UTC+0 (Greenwich Mean Time)
  - Summer (DST): UTC+1 (British Summer Time)
- ONS code: 37UJ (ONS); E07000176 (GSS)
- Ethnicity: 94.1% White; 2.7% S.Asian; 1.0% Black; 1.3% Mixed; 0.9% Chinese or Other

Rushcliffe is a local government district with borough status in south Nottinghamshire, England. Its council is based in West Bridgford. The borough also includes the towns of Bingham, Cotgrave and Radcliffe-on-Trent, as well as numerous villages and surrounding rural areas. Some of the built-up areas in the north-west of the borough, including West Bridgford, form part of the Nottingham Urban Area.

The neighbouring districts are Broxtowe, Nottingham, Gedling, Newark and Sherwood, Melton, Charnwood, North West Leicestershire and Erewash.

== History ==
The district was formed on 1 April 1974 under the Local Government Act 1972. The new district covered the whole area of two former districts and part of a third, which were all abolished at the same time:

- Basford Rural District (part)
- Bingham Rural District
- West Bridgford Urban District

The new district was named after the ancient Rushcliffe Wapentake, which had covered part of the area. Rushcliffe means "cliff where brushwood grows", from Old English hris "brushwood" and clif "cliff". The new Rushcliffe district was granted borough status from its creation, allowing the chair of the council to take the title of mayor.

Under current local government reorganisation plans, all district councils in Nottinghamshire, as well as the county council, will be abolished in 2028, with the district being split between a Nottinghamshire unitary authority and a Greater Nottingham unitary covering an area including and around Nottingham.

== Governance ==
Rushcliffe Borough Council

Type
- Type: Non-metropolitan district

Leadership
- Mayor: Richard Butler, Conservative since 21 May 2026
- Leader: Neil Clarke, Conservative since 25 May 2023
- Chief Executive: Adam Hill since 3 February 2025

Structure
- Seats: 44 councillors
- Graph of the party split among 44 seats.
- Political groups: Administration (23) Conservative (23) Other parties (21) Labour (9) Green (2) Rushcliffe Ind. (2) Liberal Democrats (1) Reform (1) Independent (6)

Elections
- Voting system: First past the post
- Last election: 4 May 2023
- Next election: 2027

Meeting place
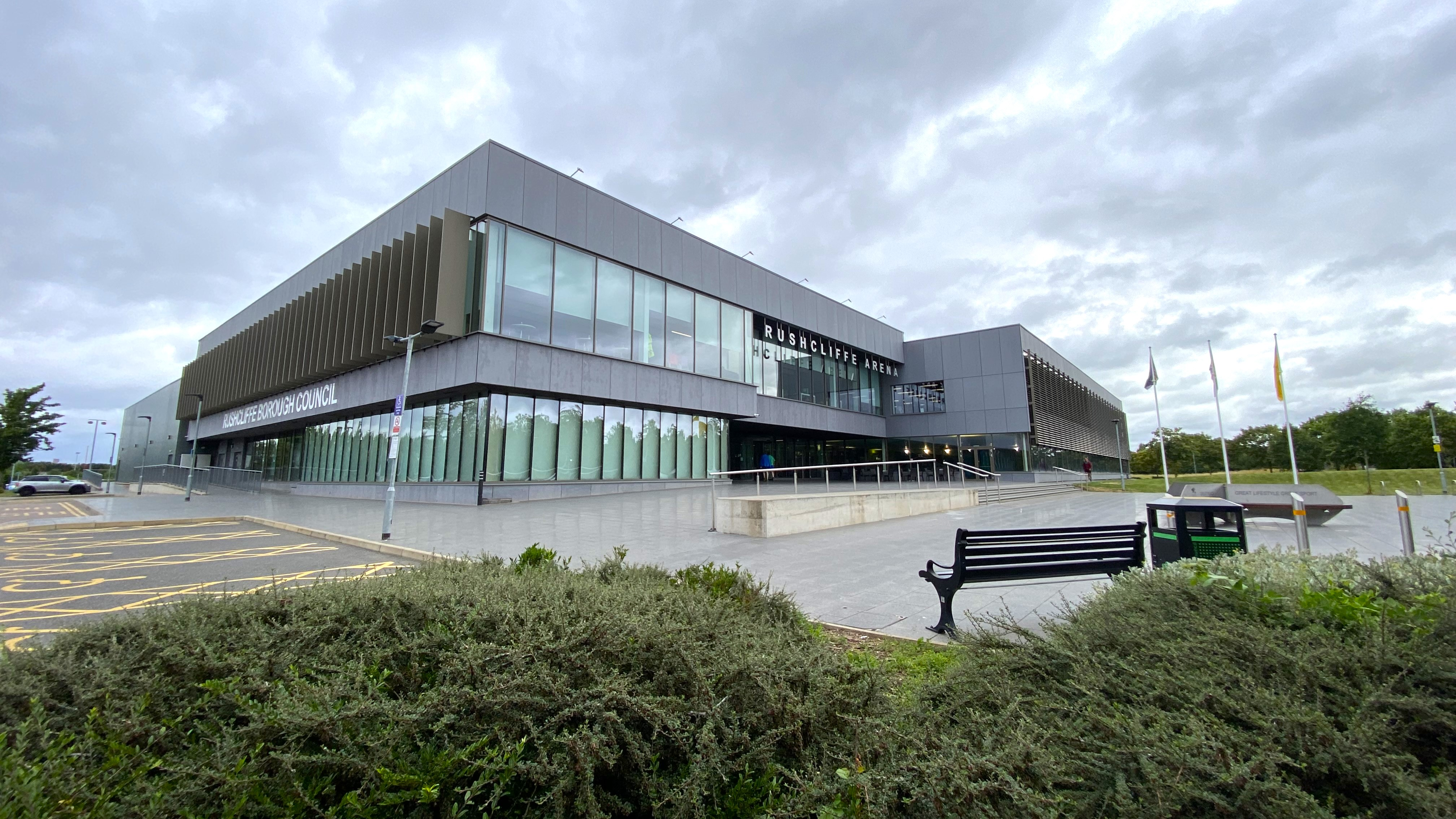
- Rushcliffe Arena, Rugby Road, West Bridgford, Nottingham, NG2 7YG

Website
- www.rushcliffe.gov.uk

Map of Rushliffe district

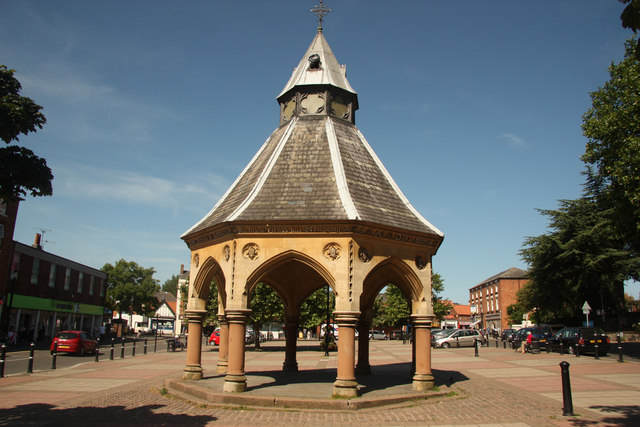
Bingham, the second-largest settlement in the borough

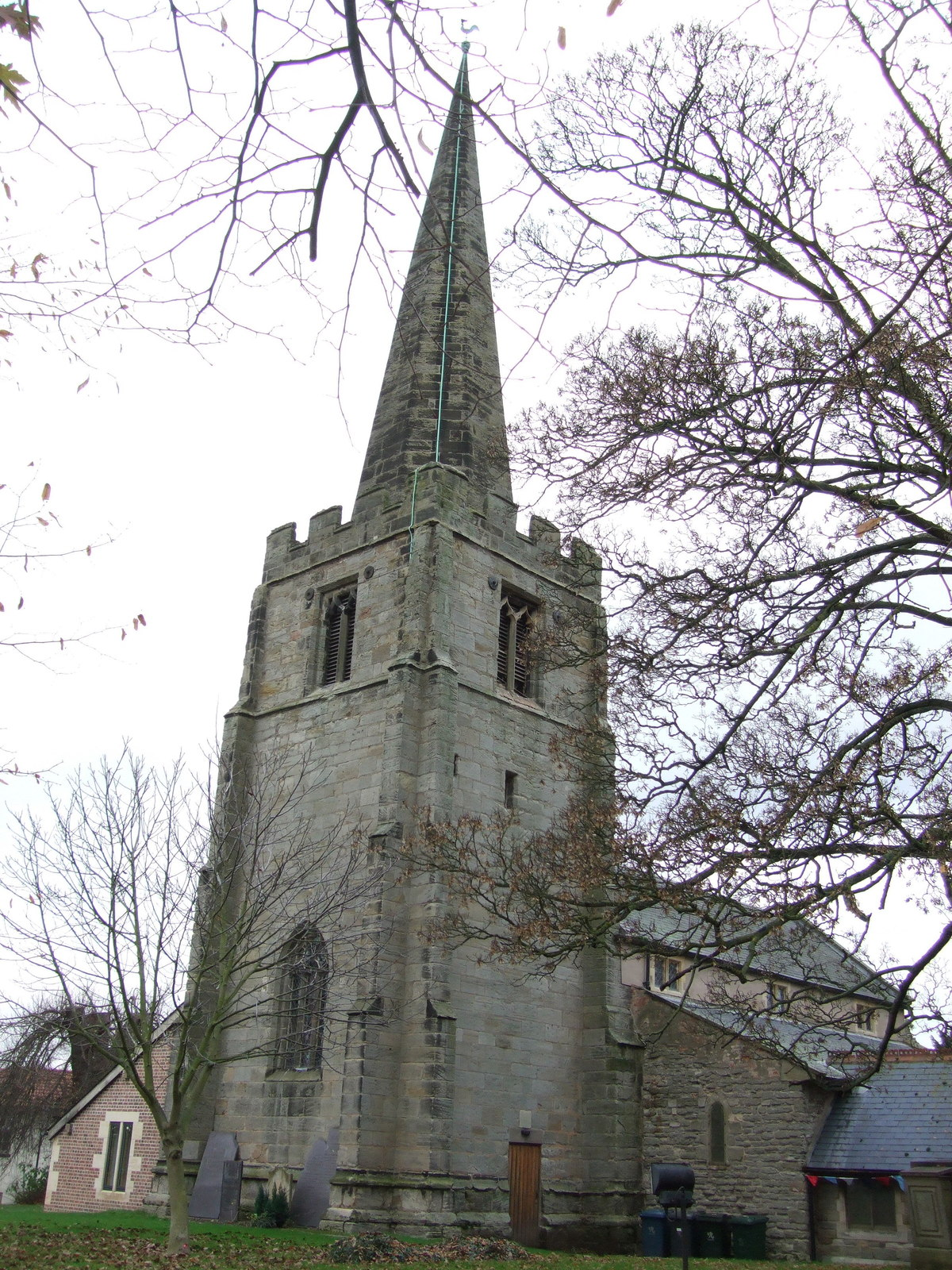
Cotgrave, the third-largest settlement in the borough

Rushcliffe Borough Council provides district-level services. County-level services are provided by Nottinghamshire County Council. Most of the borough is also covered by civil parishes, which form a third tier of local government.

=== Political control ===
The council has been under Conservative majority control since 1999.

The first election to the council was held in 1973, initially operating as a shadow authority alongside the outgoing authorities until the new arrangements came into effect on 1 April 1974. Political control of the council since 1974 has been as follows:

Party in control	Years
Conservative	1974–1995
No overall control	1995–1999
Conservative	1999–present

=== Leadership ===
The role of mayor is largely ceremonial in Rushcliffe. Political leadership is instead provided by the leader of the council. The leaders since 1974 have been:

Councillor	Party	From	To
Jim Swanwick	Conservative	1974	1976
Ray Cook	Conservative	1976	1979
Jim Swanwick	Conservative	1979	May 1987
Ray Cook	Conservative	May 1987	May 1995
George Buckley	Conservative	May 1995	May 2005
Neil Clarke	Conservative	12 May 2005	25 May 2017
Simon Robinson	Conservative	25 May 2017	May 2023
Neil Clarke	Conservative	25 May 2023	

=== Composition ===
Following the 2023 election, and subsequent changes of allegiance up to October 2025, the composition of the council was:

Party	Seats
Conservative	23
Labour	9
Green	2
Rushcliffe Independents	2
Liberal Democrats	1
Reform	1
Independent	6
Total	44

Of the six independent councillors, three sit together as the "Leake Independents" group and three sit together as the "Independent People First" group. The next election is due in 2027.

=== Premises ===
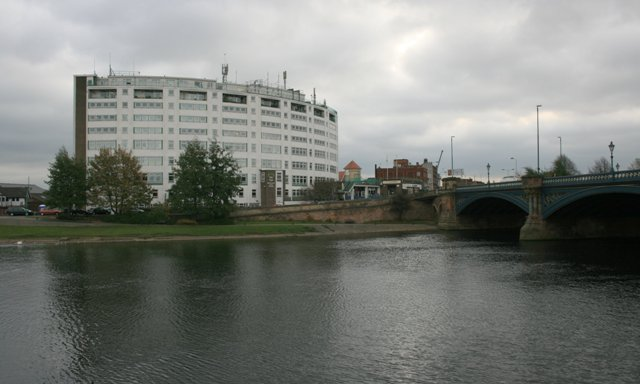
Rushcliffe Civic Centre, West Bridgford: Council's offices 1982–2016.

The council is based at the Ruscliffe Arena on Rugby Road in West Bridgford. The building is a combined leisure centre and council headquarters. The council moved into the new building in December 2016 and the leisure centre opened the following month. From 1982 to 2016 the council was based at Rushcliffe Civic Centre on Pavilion Road in West Bridgford, overlooking Trent Bridge. That building had been built in 1966 as a hotel called the Bridgford Hotel.

== Elections ==
Since the last boundary changes in 2023 the council has comprised 44 councillors representing 24 wards, with each ward electing one, two or three councillors. Elections are held every four years.

=== Wards ===
The wards are:

- Abbey
- Bingham North
- Bingham South
- Bunny
- Compton Acres
- Cotgrave
- Cranmer
- Cropwell
- East Bridgford
- Edwalton
- Gamston
- Gotham
- Keyworth and Wolds
- Lady Bay
- Leake
- Lutterell
- Musters
- Nevile and Langar
- Newton, Nottinghamshire
- Radcliffe on Trent
- Ruddington
- Soar Valley
- Tollerton
- Trent Bridge

=== Wider politics ===
The borough straddles two parliamentary constituencies. Most of the borough is in the Rushcliffe constituency. The north-eastern part of the borough around Bingham and surrounding villages is in the Newark constituency.

== Geography ==
South-east of Nottingham, the Rushcliffe boundary splits from the City of Nottingham boundary near the Holme Pierrepont Watersports Centre and then follows the River Trent to near RAF Syerston, which is the most northern part of the district, although Syerston the village itself is in the Newark and Sherwood district. It meets the River Devon near Cotham, then follows this river to the east southwards to where it meets the Leicestershire boundary. To the south, the Leicestershire/Rushcliffe boundary crosses the runways of the former RAF Langar with most of the airfield in Rushcliffe.

Rushcliffe is split between an urbanised north-west, containing suburbs of Greater Nottingham that have not been incorporated into the city, and the south and east which is predominantly rural, which stretches to the Leicestershire border. Many of these villages lie in the Vale of Belvoir. The Grantham Canal threads from nearby Grantham through Rushcliffe to the River Trent. Villages in the Vale of Belvoir include Redmile, Hickling, Harby, Stathern and Langar. Geographically, the River Soar marks the divide between the two counties.

== Towns and parishes ==
The former West Bridgford Urban District is an unparished area. The rest of the borough is divided into civil parishes. The parish councils for Bingham and Cotgrave take the style "town council". Some of the smaller parishes have a parish meeting rather than a parish council.

== Media ==
In terms of television, Rushcliffe is served by BBC East Midlands and ITV Central with television signals received from the Waltham transmitter and the Nottingham relay transmitter.

Radio stations for the area are:

- BBC Radio Nottingham
- Capital Midlands
- Smooth East Midlands
- Greatest Hits Radio Midlands

== Education ==
Rushcliffe Spencer Academy and West Bridgford school have ranked regularly in the top 100 comprehensive schools in the UK for GCSE results. In 2014 West Bridgford was ranked at 63rd of all comprehensives in the UK with 83% achieving '5+ A*-C GCSEs (or equivalent) including English and maths GCSEs' and Rushcliffe 81st in the UK with 82% achieving 5 A*-C in 2014.

The Becket School (partly geographically outside the Rushcliffe district), West Bridgford School and Rushcliffe Spencer Academy get A level results for 'Average point score per A level student (full-time equivalent)' in the top 10% of all schools in the UK, comprehensive or selective, better than many English grammar schools. These scores are in the top 2% for all UK comprehensives.

Sutton Bonington is in the south of the district, which has the Sutton Bonington Campus of the University of Nottingham.

== Notable residents ==
- Conservative politician Kenneth Clarke (the MP for the area from 1970 to 2019 and who served as Chancellor of the Exchequer from 1993 to 1997) lives in West Bridgford
- Actress Sherrie Hewson (Coronation Street, Emmerdale, Crossroads and Loose Women)
- Famous rose grower Harry Wheatcroft lived with his family in West Bridgford
- The majority of Nottingham Forest Football Club players live in Rushcliffe and have included Stuart Pearce, Andy Cole and Ian Wright. Former Manager Frank Clark lived in Keyworth. A number of ex-Nottingham Forest Players remain in the Rushcliffe area.
- Former England Test cricketer, off spin bowler and Strictly Come Dancing contestant Graeme Swann

== Arms ==
Coat of arms of Borough of Rushcliffe

Crest
On a wreath Or and Vert within a mural crown Or charged with three oak leaves a cliff surrounded by rushes Proper.
Escutcheon
Per chevron Sable and Vert in chief two bears salient respectant and in base a representation of the Bingham Butter Cross Or on a chief Argent a barrulet wavy Azure rising therefrom a bridge of three arches Or.
Motto
Salus Populi (The Welfare Of The People)
