= Andrew Clough =

British canoeist

Andrew Clough (5 January 1970 in Nottingham - 4 July 2007 in Melbourne) was a British slalom canoer who competed in the early-to-mid 1990s.

== Early life ==
He grew up on Main Street in Normanton on Soar but trained at Mansfield Canoe Club.

Both him and his older brother, Iain Clough, attended Harry Carlton School in East Leake. He went to the University of Leeds, to study chemical engineering.

== Career ==
He finished 12th in the C-2 event at the 1992 Summer Olympics in Barcelona.

== Personal life ==
He died in a car accident in Australia in 2007. At the time he was working as a chemical engineer for ModuSpec in Melbourne.
