= Iain Clough =

British slalom canoer

Iain Clough (born 22 May 1965 in Nottingham) is a British slalom canoer who competed in the early-to-mid 1990s.

== Early life ==
He grew up on Main Street in Normanton on Soar but trained at Mansfield Canoe Club.

Both him and his brother, Andrew Clough, attended Harry Carlton School in East Leake. He studied at the University of Cambridge, taking chemical engineering.

== Career ==
He finished 12th in the C-2 event at the 1992 Summer Olympics in Barcelona.

He was a chemical engineer in 1992. He moved to Guisborough in the late 1980s, both him and his brother were sponsored by ICI. He worked at ICI Wilton.
