= Kingston Brook =

River in Leicestershire and Nottinghamshire, England

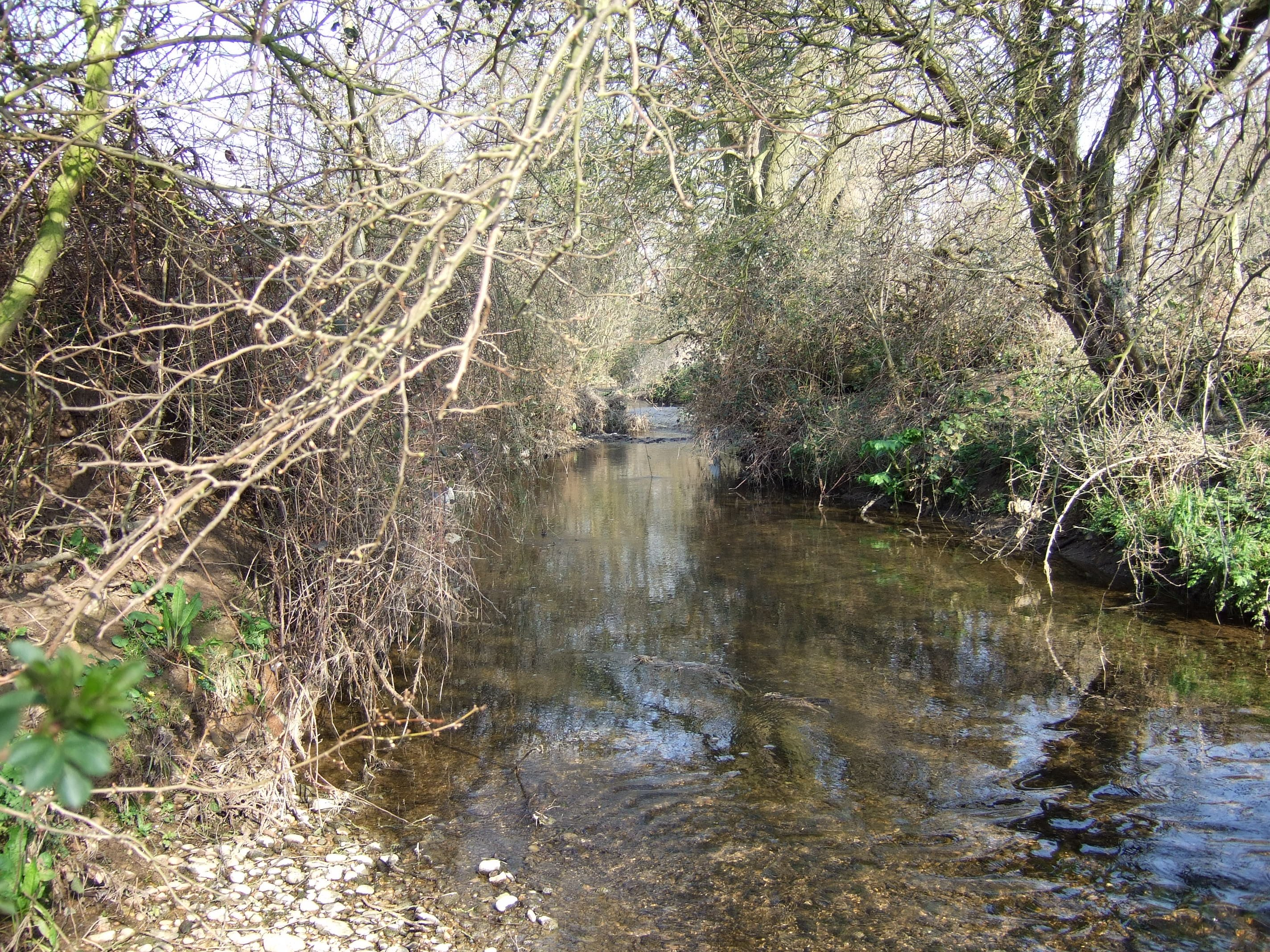
- Kingston Brook at East Leake

Location
- Country: England
- Counties: Leicestershire, Nottinghamshire

Physical characteristics
- Source: Old Dalby
- Mouth: River Soar
  - coordinates: 52°50′44″N 01°16′05″W
- Length: 25.7 km (16.0 mi)

Basin features
- Tributaries
  - left: Sheepwash Brook

Kingston Brook is a small river in central England. It arises near Old Dalby, Leicestershire on the northern edge of the ridge running from Normanton-on-Soar, Nottinghamshire to Belvoir, Leicestershire. It runs through Willoughby on the Wolds, to the south of Wysall (where it picks up a number of minor tributaries), Costock, East Leake (where it is joined by Sheepwash Brook), West Leake and meets the River Soar near Kingston-on-Soar.
