= Listed buildings in West Leake =

West Leake is a civil parish in the Rushcliffe district of Nottinghamshire, England. The parish contains five listed buildings that are recorded in the National Heritage List for England. Of these, one is listed at Grade II*, the middle of the three grades, and the others are at Grade II, the lowest grade. The parish contains the village of West Leake and the surrounding area. All the listed buildings are in the village, and consist of a church, its lychgate, a sundial in the churchyard, the former rectory and a house.

== Key ==
Grade	Criteria
II*	Particularly important buildings of more than special interest
II	Buildings of national importance and special interest

== Buildings ==
Name and location	Photograph	Date	Notes	Grade
St Helena's Church; 52.83284°N 1.21848°W		12th century	The church has been altered and extended through the centuries, including a restoration in 1878. It is built in stone with tile roofs, and consists of a nave with a clerestory, a south aisle, a south porch, a chancel, a north organ chamber and a north vestry. On the west gable is a gabled bellcote with two arched openings, a trefoil above, and two grotesques at the base.	II*
The Old Rectory; 52.83279°N 1.21895°W		1723	The rectory, later two houses, is in red brick, partly rendered, with a floor band, a wooden cornice with pendants, and a tile roof with coped gables and kneelers. There are two storeys and attics, a double depth plan, a main range of five bays, a two-storey single-bay wing on the left with a slate roof, and a lean-to. On the front is a gabled porch and a doorway with a fanlight, and the windows are sashes. At the rear is a bow window on a plinth with a conical roof, and casement windows.	II
55 Main Street; 52.83396°N 1.21601°W	—	Mid 18th century	The house is in red brick, and has a slate roof with brick coped gables and kneelers. There are two storeys, the main range has three bays, to the right is a recessed two-bay wing, and further to the right is a single-storey two-bay extension. In the centre of the main range is an open porch and a doorway with a fanlight. The windows in the ground floor are tripartite casements under segmental arches, and the upper floor contains tripartite horizontally-sliding sash windows.	II
Sundial; 52.83280°N 1.21826°W		18th century	The sundial is in the churchyard of St Helena's Church, to the south of the chancel. It is in stone, and has a moulded plinth, and a tapering pedestal with a bulbous reeded base. At the top is circular coping, and a copper sundial with a gnomon.	II
Lychgate; 52.83324°N 1.21821°W		c. 1919	The lychgate at the entrance to the churchyard of St Helena's Church is mainly in wood, with the supporting posts on stone plinths. The roof is hipped and slated and has a ridge cross, and is carried on decorative curved brackets. Between the posts are gates and panels, and on the eaves band is an inscription and dates relating to the First World War.	II
