= Alexander Roulstone =

British World War I flying ace

- Born: 10 October 1890; Salford, Lancashire, England
- Died: December 1965 (aged 75); Isle of Wight, England
- Burial place: East Leake, Nottinghamshire, England
- Military career
- Allegiance: United Kingdom
- Branch: British Army; Royal Air Force
- Service years: 1915–1920
- Rank: Captain
- Units: Nottinghamshire and Derbyshire Regiment; No. 110 Squadron RFC; No. 25 Squadron RFC; No. 57 Squadron RFC
- Awards: Military Cross
- Other work: Businessman

Captain Alexander Roulstone MC (10 October 1890 – December 1965) was a British World War I flying ace credited with eight aerial victories. He scored his victories, and downed two German aces, while handicapped by flying bombers.

== World War I service ==
Roulstone was commissioned as a temporary second lieutenant in the infantry on 7 April 1915, and on 9 May 1916 was transferred to the regular forces from a service battalion in the Nottinghamshire and Derbyshire Regiment. He was transferred to the General List to serve in the Royal Flying Corps, and appointed a flying officer on 14 February 1917. By 6 April, he was flying with No. 25 Squadron in a Royal Aircraft Factory FE.2b; when flying over Givenchy, he saw a German Albatros D.III set afire a British aircraft from No. 16 Squadron, turned the tables on the German, Leutnant Karl Emil Schäfer, and scored his first victory. Roulstone would soon score twice more as a FE.2b pilot, on 24 April and 21 May 1917. On 7 July 1917, he was appointed a flight commander, with rank of acting captain. At about the same time, No. 25 Squadron upgraded to Airco DH.4s as replacement bombers for the FE.2. On 20 and 22 July, Roulstone used his new mount to great effect, downing a German each day and becoming an ace. He added one more to his score a month later, on 22 August. After a transfer to No. 57 Squadron, which saw him still a flight commander piloting a DH.4, he rounded off his list with a victory each on 13 and 17 March 1918. His last win was over Hans Bethge. Although classified as an "out of control" victory by the British, Bethge died of wounds received, but in turn wounded Roulstone.

== Post World War I ==
Roulstone was granted a short service commission as a flight lieutenant effective 24 October 1919, although on 9 March 1920, the notice of his commission was cancelled. On 18 March 1920, he was transferred to the unemployed list of the Royal Air Force.

Roulstone settled in East Leake, Nottinghamshire, where he bought land and built a large bungalow he named "Adastral House". He became the company secretary and director of the Marbleaegis mine, which was bought out by British Gypsum in 1944. In 1954 he and his wife donated a plot of land on Main Street, East Leake, for the building of a new Catholic church "Our Lady of the Angels". In 1961 he sold some land close to his home for house building, and part of this development is named "Roulstone Crescent".

He died on the Isle of Wight in late 1965 and was buried in East Leake on 6 December.

== Military honours ==
Military Cross
T./2nd Lt. (T./Lt.) Alexander Roulstone, Gen. List and R.F.C.

"For conspicuous gallantry and devotion to duty when engaged in aerial fighting and in photographic reconnaissances. In spite of continual hostile attacks he had proved most successful in securing photographs, and on several occasions he shot down enemy machines out of control, displaying skilful manoeuvring and great determination."
