= Listed buildings in East Leake =

East Leake is a civil parish in the Rushcliffe district of Nottinghamshire, England. The parish contains 14 listed buildings that are recorded in the National Heritage List for England. Of these, one is listed at Grade I, the highest of the three grades, and the others are at Grade II, the lowest grade. The parish contains the village of East Leake and the surrounding countryside. The listed buildings consist of houses, cottages and farmhouses, two churches, a chest tomb in a churchyard, a water house, a pinfold, and a war memorial.

== Key ==
Grade	Criteria
I	Buildings of exceptional interest, sometimes considered to be internationally important
II	Buildings of national importance and special interest

== Buildings ==
Name and location	Photograph	Date	Notes	Grade
St Mary's Church; 52.83070°N 1.18249°W		12th century	The church has been altered and extended through the centuries, and the chancel was rebuilt in 1886. The church is built in stone, and has roofs of lead and slate. It consists of a nave with a clerestory, a south aisle, a south porch, a chancel, a north vestry and a west steeple. The steeple has a tower with three stages, a chamfered plinth, a south doorway with a pointed arch, lancet windows, clock faces, two-light bell openings, and an embattled parapet, surmounted by a recessed spire. The nave also has an embattled parapet, and to the west of the porch is a mullioned window and a sundial.	I
Honeypot Cottage; 52.83013°N 1.18032°W	—	Early 17th century	Two cottages later combined into one, the earlier part is timber framed with brick nogging, the later part is in red brick, both parts are on plinths, and the roof is slated. There are two storeys and five bays. The windows are casements.	II
1 and 3 Brookside; 52.83025°N 1.18187°W		Mid 17th century	A row of three cottages, later extended, and combined into two, the older part is timber framed with red brick nogging, the extensions are in stone and brick, partly rendered, and with a pantile roof. There is a single storey and attics, and eight bays. On the front are doorways, horizontally-sliding sash windows, and a sloping dormer.	II
Old Hall Farmhouse and Squash Club; 52.83115°N 1.18235°W	—	Late 17th century	Originally a farmhouse and a barn, the building is in red brick with blue brick diapering, on a stone plinth, with dentilled floor bands rising over the windows, a raised eaves band, and a pantile roof with brick coped gables and kneelers. The house has two storeys and three bays, on the left is a lower single-bay wing, and recessed on the right is another single-bay wing. The windows are casements. Projecting on the right is the former barn that has two storeys and three bays.	II
25 Main Street; 52.83155°N 1.18020°W		1715	The house, which was extended in 1728, and was at one time used as a post office, is in brick with red stretchers and blue headers, and some stone, and has a tile roof with brick coped gables and kneelers. There are two storeys and three bays. The doorway is in the centre, and the windows are sashes. In the left gables are blue brick diapering and in the right gables are dates in blue brick.	II
Water house 52.85033°N 1.15883°W	—	Early 18th century	The water house is in red brick with some blue brick chequering, it is on a stone plinth, and has a pantile roof with coped gables and kneelers. There is a single storey and an attic, and a single bay. On each side is a segmental-arched doorway over an opening for a water course, and in the attic are two blocked slit vents.	II
Chest tomb 52.83066°N 1.18209°W		1731	The tomb is in the churchyard of St Mary's Church, and is to the memory of John Bley. It consists of a rectangular stone chest tomb with panelled sides, on a chamfered plinth, with a moulded cornice. On the south side is an inscribed slate plaque.	II
Baptist Church; 52.83039°N 1.17232°W		Mid 18th century	The church, which was enlarged in 1839, is in red brick with some stone, partly on a plinth, with dogtooth eaves and a slate roof. There are two storeys, the north front is gabled, and has three bays. In the centre is a tripartite sash window, flanked by doorways with decorative fanlights, and in the upper floor are two sash windows. All the openings have rendered wedge lintels. On the east front are arched casement windows in the ground floor and four sash windows above, and in the gable apex is a datestone.	II
Pinfold; 52.83107°N 1.18062°W		18th century	The pinfold is a rectangular area enclosed by coped walls, with small gateways in the west and south sides. There is some patching in brick, and the sides measure 8 metres (26 ft) and 6 metres (20 ft).	II
10 and 12 Main Street; 52.83142°N 1.17987°W	—	Late 18th century	A pair of cottages in red brick with some stone, on a stone plinth, with an eaves band and a slate roof. There are two storeys and five bays. On the front are two doorways with fanlights, and the windows are sashes.	II
Church House; 52.83034°N 1.18279°W		Late 18th century	The house is in red brick on a plinth, with floor bands, dentilled eaves and a slate roof. There are two storeys, attics and a cellar, and three bays. In the centre, steps lead up to a doorway with an eared architrave, a fanlight, and a pediment. On the lower two floors are sash windows with wedge brick lintels, and the top floor contains one casement window and two sashes, all with segmental heads.	II
8 Main Street; 52.83141°N 1.18002°W	—	Early 19th century	The house is in rendered red brick, on a plinth, with dentilled eaves, and a tile roof. There are two storeys and three bays. Steps lead up to the central doorway that has reeded colonnettes and a bracketed cornice. The windows are sashes, those in the ground floor with wedge lintels.	II
Glebe Farmhouse; 52.83081°N 1.18048°W	—	1797–98	A house and a cottage combined into one house, it is in red brick with dentilled eaves and pantile roofs. The original house has two storeys and attics and three bays, and contains a central doorway with a fanlight and a bracketed hood. Recessed on the left is a two-storey single-bay wing, and to its left is the former cottage, with two storeys and an attic and two bays. The windows are sashes, most with segmental heads. In the gable ends of the former house and the cottage are dates in blue brick.	II
War memorial 52.83067°N 1.18166°W		c. 1919	The war memorial is in an enclosure by a road junction. It is in stone, and consists of a hexagonal platform, on which is a chamfered octagonal base and a stepped hexagonal plinth. Standing on this is a hexagonal column with a moulded base and a scalloped capital, surmounted by a copper cross.	II
