= Listed buildings in Costock =

Costock is a civil parish in the Rushcliffe district of Nottinghamshire, England. The parish contains eight listed buildings that are recorded in the National Heritage List for England. Of these, one is listed at Grade II*, the middle of the three grades, and the others are at Grade II, the lowest grade. The parish contains the village of Costock and the surrounding countryside, and the listed buildings consist of houses and associated structures, farmhouses, and a church.

== Key ==
Grade	Criteria
II*	Particularly important buildings of more than special interest
II	Buildings of national importance and special interest

== Buildings ==
Name and location	Photograph	Date	Notes	Grade
St Giles' Church; 52.83267°N 1.14887°W		14th century	The church has been altered and extended through the centuries, in 1848–49 the north aisle and bellcote were added, and in 1862 George Gilbert Scott restored the nave and the chancel. The church is built in stone with a slate roof, and consists of a nave, a south porch, a north aisle, and a chancel. At the west end of the aisle is a bellcote.	II
The Manor House; 52.83212°N 1.14971°W	—	Late 15th century	The house, which has been altered and extended, and the attached chapel later converted for domestic use, it is stone and brick, with stone dressings and slate roofs. There are five bays, the middle three bays with two storeys, and the outer bays, which as gabled and extend to the rear, with two bays and attics. In the angles at the rear are stair towers. In the centre of the front is a lean-to porch, and the windows are a mix of sashes and casements, some with hood moulds. Projecting to the right is the former chapel, with two storeys and one bay. It is in brick, and has a crow-stepped coped gable and a finial. There are clasping pilasters, a floor band, a re-used rose window], and pinnacles.	II*
The Hall Farmhouse; 52.83286°N 1.14753°W	—	Early 17th century	The farmhouse, which has been altered and extended, is in stone and brick, with stone dressings, quoins, and roofs of tile and pantile. The original part has two storeys and an attic, three bays, and a moulded lintel band. It contains a central doorway with a quoined surround and a Tudor arch. Recessed on the left is a later extension in red brick with two storeys and a single bay. The east front facing the lane has two storeys and five bays, it is in stone, and on the right corner is a buttress. Most of the windows are mullioned casements, and in the attic is a dormer with a hipped roof.	II
Fulwell Farmhouse; 52.83202°N 1.14882°W	—	Late 17th century	The farmhouse was extended in the late 18th century. The original part is in red brick with some stone, on a stone plinth, with floor bands, dentilled eaves, and a slate roof with blue brick coped gables and kneelers. There are two storeys and attics, and two bays. The doorway has a moulded surround, a decorated fanlight, and a shaped lead hood. To the right is a canted bay window, the windows in the lower floors are sashes, and in the attic are casement windows. The lower extension to the left is in brick with a tile roof, two storeys and an attic, and a single bay.	II
Cherry Tree Cottage and outbuildings 52.83126°N 1.14535°W	—	Early 18th century	The cottage is in painted brick on a plinth, and has pantile roofs with coped gables and kneelers. There are two storeys and four bays, the right bay projecting and gabled. In the left three bays is a doorway with a hood, and horizontally-sliding sash windows, those in the ground floor with segmental heads. In the right bay are casement windows, and on the right side is a stable door. To the left are two single-storey outbuildings.	II
Highfields; 52.84169°N 1.13167°W		1729	The house is in chequered red and blue brick, and some yellow brick and stone, with stone dressings, a floor band, a hipped pantile mansard roof, and two storeys. At the corner are clasping buttresses rising to pilasters with moulded capitals. The windows are casements under segmental arches. At the rear are two round-arched openings, partly blocked, with imposts and keystones.	II
White House; 52.83157°N 1.14854°W		Mid 18th century	The house, which has been extended, is rendered, and has floor bands, a buttress on the left, and a tile roof. There are two storeys and attics, and the original block has three bays. In the centre is a doorway with a reeded surround and a cornice on brackets, and the windows are sashes. To the right is a two-bay extension with dentilled eaves, and a gabled porch with decorative bargeboards.	II
Pomerania; 52.83285°N 1.14957°W		Early 19th century	A brick house with a raised eaves band and a pantile roof. There are two storeys and attics, and three bays. In the centre is a doorway with a tripartite fanlight and a hood, and the windows are casements, those in the lower two floor under segmental heads.	II
