= St Mary's Church, East Leake =

Church in East Leake, Nottinghamshire

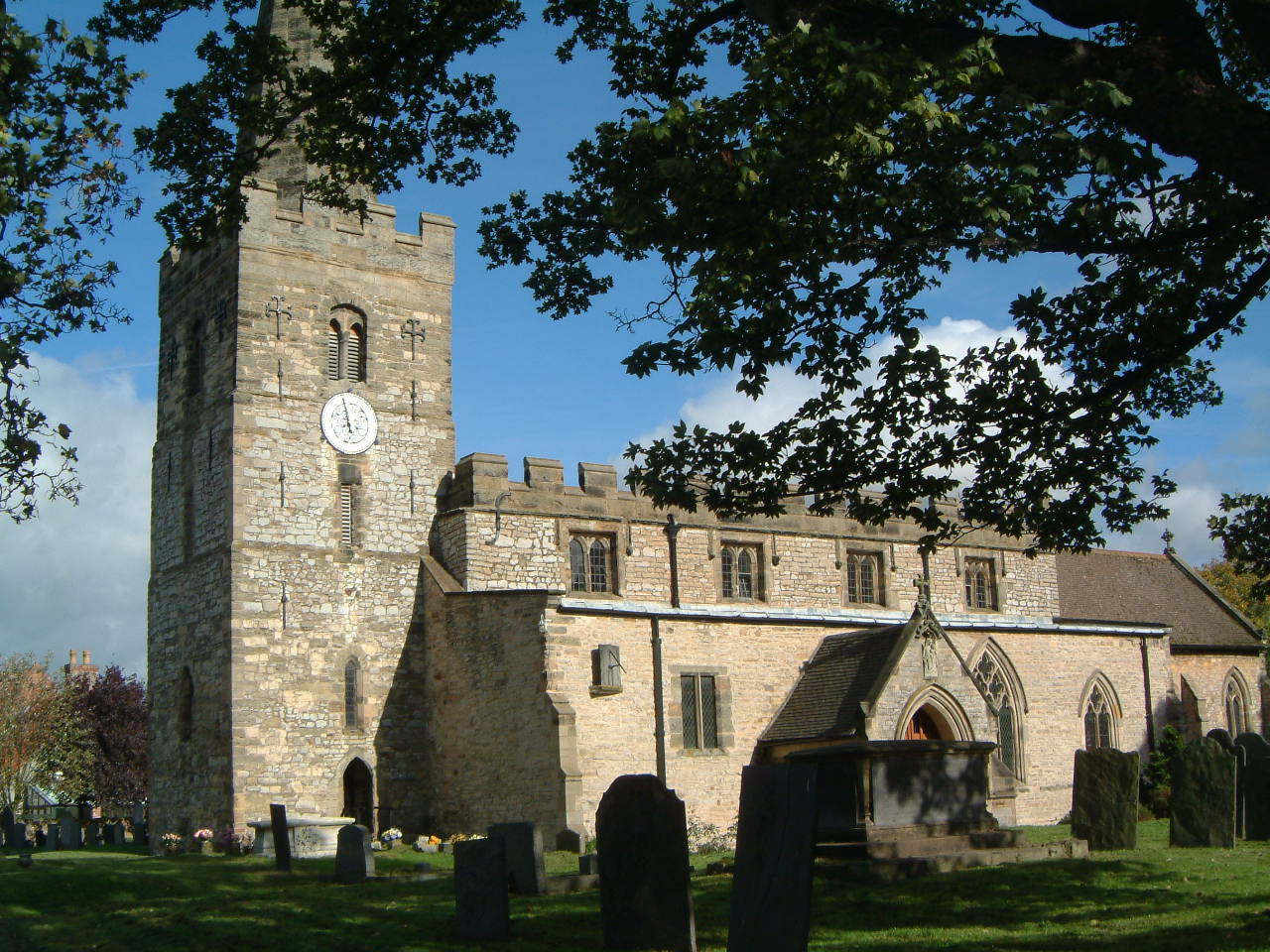
- St Mary's
- St Mary's Church, East Leake
- 52°49′51″N 01°10′58″W
- Denomination: Church of England
- Churchmanship: Low church Evangelical
- Website: St Mary's East Leake

Administration
- Province: York
- Diocese: Southwell and Nottingham
- Parish: East Leake

Clergy
- Priest: Rev’d Tim Parker

St Mary's Church is a parish church in the Church of England in East Leake, Nottinghamshire.

The church is Grade I listed by the Department for Digital, Culture, Media and Sport as a building of outstanding architectural or historic interest.

== History ==
The church dates from the Norman period but has substantial later medieval work. Until the fourteenth century, the church was dedicated to St Leonard, but the church was re-dedicated to St Mary who was more popular.

After the chancel collapsed in the nineteenth century, a major restoration was carried out in 1886 by W. S. Weatherley.

== Stained glass ==
There are stained glass windows by Charles Eamer Kempe, James Powell and Sons and Heaton, Butler and Bayne.

== Organ ==
The church has a pipe organ by Ingram built in 1914. The specification of the organ can be found on the National Pipe Organ Register.

In April 2021 a new organist, Richard Babington, was appointed.

== Bells ==
The church has six bells.

== Current parish status ==
The church runs regular Life Explored courses for anyone interested in exploring Christianity.

It is in a group of parishes which includes:

- St Giles' Church, Costock
- St Mary's Church, East Leake
- All Saints' Church, Rempstone
- St Helena's Church, West Leake
- Church of St John the Baptist, Stanford on Soar

== See also ==
- Grade I listed buildings in Nottinghamshire
- Listed buildings in East Leake
