= Rempstone =

Village and civil parish in Nottinghamshire, England

Coordinates: 52°48′49″N 1°08′40″W

- Village and civil parish
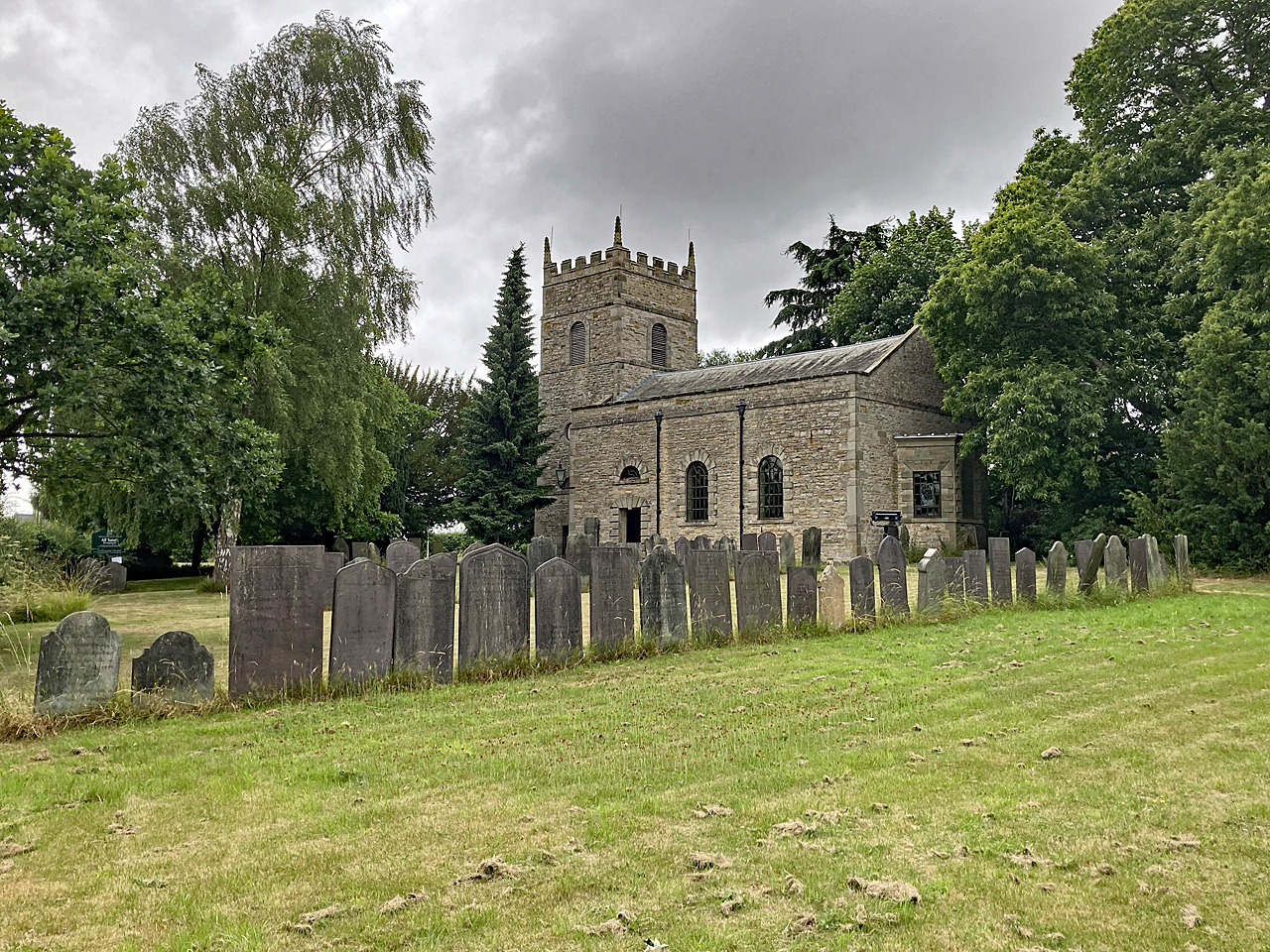
- All Saints Church

- Location within Nottinghamshire
- Interactive map of Rempstone
- Area: 2.47 sq mi (6.4 km^{2})
- Population: 412 (2021)
  - Density: 167/sq mi (64/km^{2})
- OS grid reference: SK 577244
  - London: 100 mi (160 km) SSE
- District: Rushcliffe
- Shire county: Nottinghamshire
- Region: East Midlands
- Country: England
- Sovereign state: United Kingdom
- Post town: LOUGHBOROUGH
- Postcode district: LE12
- Dialling code: 01509
- Police: Nottinghamshire
- Fire: Nottinghamshire
- Ambulance: East Midlands
- UK Parliament: Rushcliffe
- Website: https://www.rempstonevillage.org.uk

Rempstone (/ˈrɛmpstən/) is a village and civil parish in the Rushcliffe district of Nottinghamshire, England. It is close to Nottingham, Loughborough, Melton Mowbray and Shepshed as well as the Leicestershire border. The population of the civil parish at the 2011 census was 367, increasing to 412 residents at the 2021 census. It is situated at the crossing of the A60 and A6006 roads and the village is mentioned in the 1086 Domesday Book.

== Churches ==
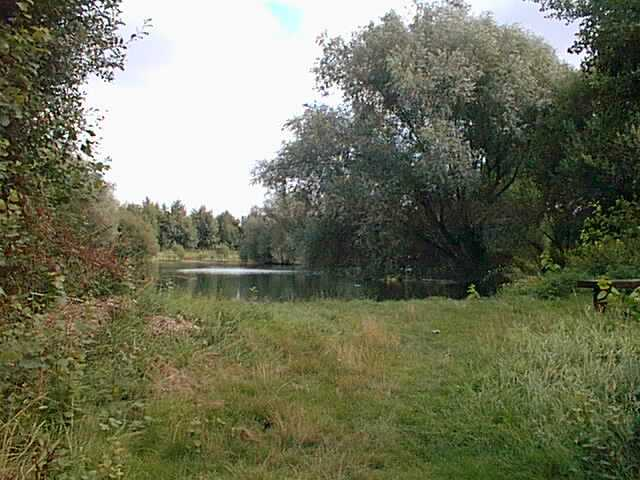
The former site of the manor house, which is now a pond

The first church in Rempstone, St Peter in the Rushes, stood approximately half a mile (1 km) north-east of the present village near the Sheepwash Brook, next to a former moated manor house, which is now a pond used for fishing. A holy spring is also at this located at this site. An archaeological dig, which took place between 1960 and 1962, revealed the foundations of a 12th-century tower with square buttresses. Earthworks near the brook indicate the original site of the village.

The present church, All Saints' Church, was built mainly from the materials of the previous church, and was consecrated by the Archbishop of York in 1773. About 20 headstones mark the site of the original churchyard and during the last 200 years of the churches existence, approximately 950 burials took place including that of six former Rectors of Rempstone.

== Transport ==
'Kinchbus 9' (in yellow and blue livery) passes through Rempstone along the A60 between Nottingham and Loughborough daily, including into the late evenings from Monday to Saturday.

== Rempstone Steam and Country Show ==
Started in 1956, the Steam and Traction Engine rally has outgrown the village and nowadays takes place in nearby Wymeswold on the second full weekend in July. It has always donated its profits to local and national charities including Rainbows Children's Hospice, Steps Conductive Education Centre, The Air Ambulance Service, Macmillan Cancer Support, Demelza Hospice Care, and Wymeswold Village Community Centre Project). The event extends over 65 acres with 25 acres of exhibits including vintage vehicles, 40 steam traction engines, countryside exhibitions and an ale bar.

== Neighbouring villages ==
- Costock
- East Leake
- Hoton
- Stanford on Soar
- Wymeswold

== See also ==
- Listed buildings in Rempstone
