= St Helena's Church, West Leake =

Church in West Leake, Nottinghamshire, England

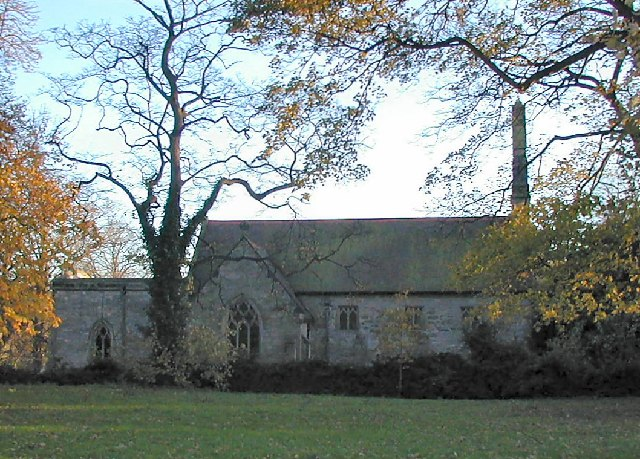
- St Helena's Church, West Leake
- 52°49′57″N 01°13′06″W
- Denomination: Church of England
- Churchmanship: Broad Church

History
- Dedication: St Helena

Administration
- Province: York
- Diocese: Southwell and Nottingham
- Parish: West Leake

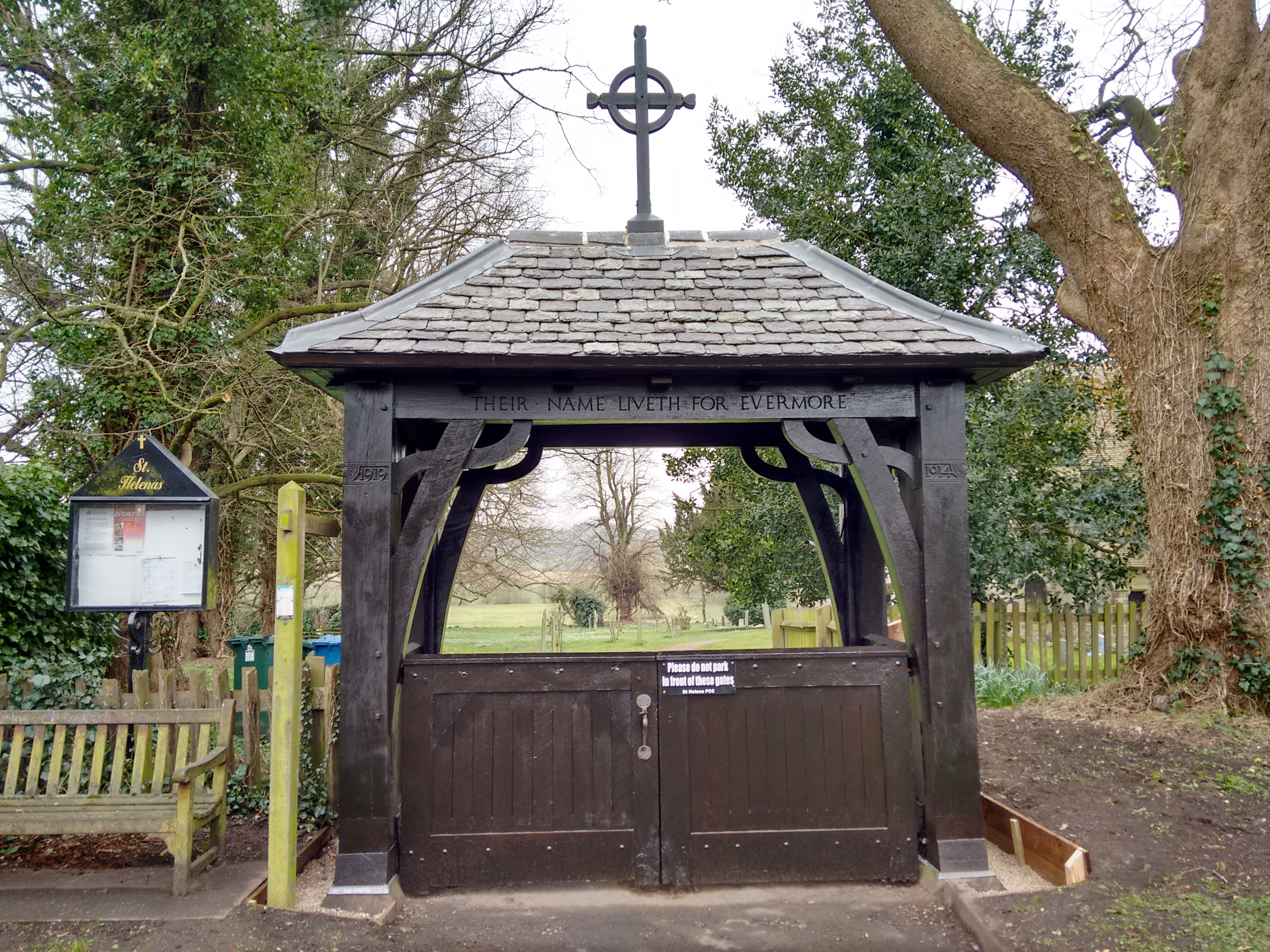
Lychgate renovated March 2015

St Helena's Church, West Leake is a parish church in the Church of England in West Leake, Nottinghamshire.

The church is Grade II* listed by the Department for Digital, Culture, Media and Sport as it is a particularly significant building of more than local interest. The grade II listed lychgate is possibly by the architect Temple Moore.

== History ==
The church was medieval, parts of the north wall dating from the 12th century but restored in 1878 by the architect Henry Hall for Edward Strutt, 1st Baron Belper.

== Pipe organ ==
The church has a two manual pipe organ by J.M. Grunwell of Derby, dating from 1878. A specification for the organ can be found on the National Pipe Organ Register.

== Church bells ==
The church has two bells in an open turret. The bells were manufactured by Taylor's of Loughborough.

== Current parish status ==
It is in a group of parishes which includes:

- St Giles' Church, Costock
- St Mary's Church, East Leake
- All Saints' Church, Rempstone
- St Helena's Church, West Leake
- Church of St John the Baptist, Stanford on Soar

== See also ==
- Grade II* listed buildings in Nottinghamshire
- Listed buildings in West Leake
