= All Saints' Church, Rempstone =

Church in Rempstone, Nottinghamshire

Coordinates: 52°48′54″N 01°08′54″W

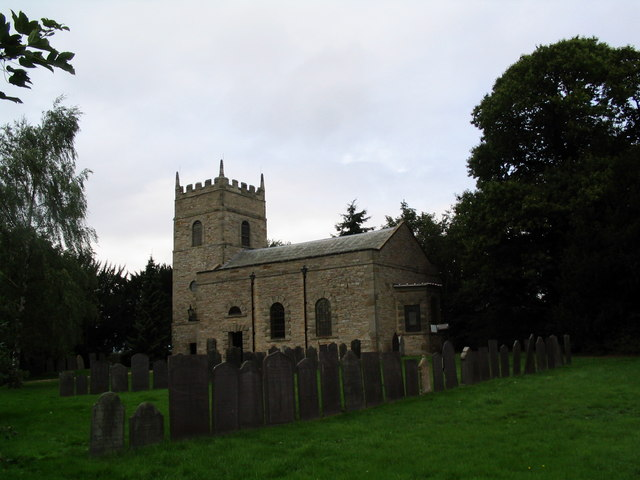
- All Saints' Church, Rempstone
- Denomination: Church of England
- Churchmanship: Broad Church

History
- Dedication: All Saints

Administration
- Province: York
- Diocese: Southwell and Nottingham
- Parish: Rempstone

All Saints' Church, Rempstone is a parish church in the Church of England in Rempstone, Nottinghamshire.

The church is Grade II listed by the Department for Digital, Culture, Media and Sport as it is a building of special architectural or historic interest.

== History ==
The church was built between 1771 and 1773. It was consecrated by Robert Hay Drummond the Archbishop of York.

The earlier church in Rempstone, St Peter in the Rushes, stood approximately half a mile (1 km) north-east of the present village near the Sheepwash Brook next to a moated Manor House now a fishing lake, a Holy spring is also at this location. An archaeological dig, 1960–1962, revealed the foundations of a 12th-century tower with square buttresses.

The present church was built mainly from the materials of the old church. About 20 headstones mark the site of the original churchyard and during the last 200 years of this church there were approximately 950 burials including that of six former Rectors of Rempstone.

== Current parish status ==
It is in a group of parishes which includes:

- St Giles' Church, Costock
- St Mary's Church, East Leake
- All Saints' Church, Rempstone
- St Helena's Church, West Leake
- Church of St John the Baptist, Stanford on Soar

== Bells ==
The church has six bells.

== See also ==
- Listed buildings in Rempstone
