= St Giles' Church, Costock =

Church in Costock, Nottinghamshire

Coordinates: 52°49′58″N 01°08′56″W

St. Giles' Church, Costock
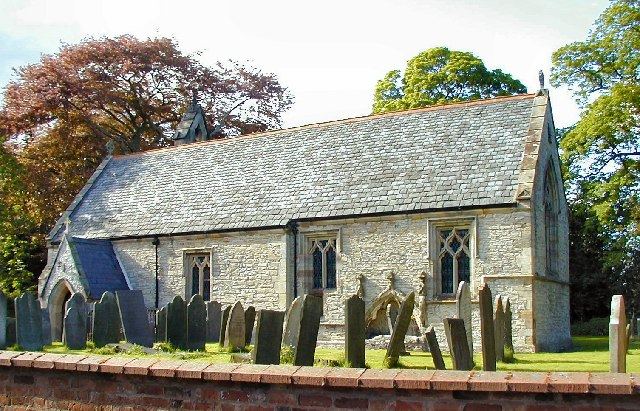
- St. Giles' Church, Costock
- Denomination: Church of England
- Churchmanship: Broad Church

History
- Dedication: St. Giles

Administration
- Province: York
- Diocese: Southwell and Nottingham
- Parish: Costock

St. Giles' Church, Costock is a parish church in the Church of England in Costock, Nottinghamshire.

The church is Grade II listed by the Department for Digital, Culture, Media and Sport as it is a building of special architectural or historic interest.

== History ==
The church was medieval but a north aisle was added in 1848 by G. G. Place and it was restored in 1862 by Gilbert Scott.

== Current parish status ==
It is in a group of parishes which includes:

- St Giles' Church, Costock
- St Mary's Church, East Leake
- All Saints' Church, Rempstone
- St Helena's Church, West Leake
- Church of St John the Baptist, Stanford on Soar

== See also ==
- Listed buildings in Costock
