= Listed buildings in Rempstone =

Rempstone is a civil parish in the Rushcliffe district of Nottinghamshire, England. The parish contains 16 listed buildings that are recorded in the National Heritage List for England. All the listed buildings are designated at Grade II, the lowest of the three grades, which is applied to "buildings of national importance and special interest". The parish contains the village of Rempstone and the surrounding countryside, and the listed buildings consist of houses, cottages and associated structures, farmhouses, and a church.

== Buildings ==
Name and location	Photograph	Date	Notes
Top Farmhouse; 52.81340°N 1.14037°W		Early 17th century	A farmhouse and cottage, later combined, in red brick with some blue brick and render, on a rendered plinth, with dentilled bands over the ground floor, forming semicircular arches over the openings, and roofs of tile and pantile, with brick coped gables and kneelers. There are two storeys and attics, four bays, and a single-storey single-bay wing on the left. The windows are casements.
Grange Farmhouse; 52.81428°N 1.14383°W	—	17th century	The farmhouse is in stone, the front is in whitewashed brick, it is on a rendered plinth, and has floor bands, dentilled eaves and a tile roof. There are two storeys and attics, three bays, and a rear wing. The central doorway has a fanlight, the windows are sashes, some with segmental heads, and all the openings have wedge lintels.
The Cottage; 52.81367°N 1.14266°W		Mid 17th century	The cottage is timber framed with rendered red brick nogging. There is a single storey and three bays, the right bay gabled. On the front are a doorway and two casement windows, and in the left gable end is exposed timber framing, including an upper cruck.
The Thatch; 52.81374°N 1.14638°W		Mid 17th century	The cottage is rendered, on a brick plinth, and has a thatched roof. There is a single storey and attics, four bays, and a single-storey two-bay wing on the left. On the front is a lattice porch with a thatched roof, tripartite casement windows with shutters, and eyebrow dormers.
Manor House; 52.81251°N 1.14441°W	—	Late 17th century	A house in red brick with some stone, on a stone plinth, with quoins, a dogtooth and raised eaves band, and a pantile roof. There are two storeys and attics, two bays, and a two-storey rear wing. The windows are casements under segmental arches.
Hrempis Farmhouse; 52.81346°N 1.14145°W		Early 18th century	The farmhouse is in red brick with blue brick chequering and some stone, on a stone plinth, with chequered floor bands, a bracketed eaves cornice, and a pantile roof with rendered coped gables and kneelers. There are two storeys, three bays, and later rear extensions. In the centre is a doorway, and the windows are sashes, those in the ground floor are tripartite, and the ground floor openings have cornices.
Gate piers, Manor House; 52.81291°N 1.14528°W	—	Mid 18th century	The gate piers flanking the entrance to the drive are in stone. They have chamfered rustication, and each pier is coping and has an orb finial.
All Saints' Church; 52.81502°N 1.14777°W		1771	The church is in stone with a slate roof, and consists of a west tower, and a nave with an apse at the east end, canted on the outside, and semicircular inside. The tower has four stages, bands, a south doorway with a quoined surround, in the second stage are semicircular windows and a round window above, the third stage contains round-headed bell openings, and at the top is an embattled parapet with four crocketed pinnacles. On the south side is a doorway, above which is a semicircular window, and to the right are two round-headed windows; these openings and those elsewhere have Gibbs-style surrounds. On the body of the church is a parapet, and at the east end is a pediment.
Clifton Lodge; 52.81509°N 1.14718°W	—	Late 18th century	A rendered house, on a plinth, with floor bands, dogtooth eaves and a slate roof. There are three storeys and three bays. On the front are three doorways, and above are casement windows, those in the middle floor tripartite.
Elms Farmhouse and Farm Cottage; 52.81389°N 1.14460°W	—	Late 18th century	The farmhouse and attached cottage are in brick some stone, on a plinth, with floor bands, dentilled eaves and slate roofs. The house has two storeys and attics, and three bays, and the doorway has an eared architrave and a pediment. Recessed to the right is the cottage, with two bays and a doorway with a segmental head. The windows are casements, those in the ground floor are tripartite, and all have painted wedge lintels.
The Old Rectory; 52.81329°N 1.14626°W		Late 18th century	The rectory, later a private house, is in painted stucco over brick, with some stone and applied timber framing, on a partial plinth, and it has a tile roof with a stone coped gable and a kneeler. There are two storeys and six bays, and an earlier rear wing. On the front is a bow window, and the other windows are sashes.
Rempstone Hall; 52.81485°N 1.15557°W		1796	A country house later used for other purposes, it is in whitewashed red brick, on a plinth, with a modillion cornice, a balustraded parapet, and a hipped slate roof. There are two storeys and nine bays, the two outer bays at each end projecting, and containing a floor band and clasping pilasters. Between them is a five-bay colonnade with an entablature on Ionic columns. The windows are sashes, those in the outer bays with pilasters and pediments.
Beech House; 52.81350°N 1.14116°W		Early 19th century	The house is in red brick with a blue brick band at the base, dentilled eaves and a pantile roof. There are three storeys and three bays. In the centre is a blocked doorway, and the windows are sashes, those in the lower two floors under segmental arches.
Gardener's Cottage; 52.81357°N 1.16068°W	—	Early 19th century	The cottage is in painted brick and has a slate roof with overhanging eaves. There are two storeys and three bays, and canted side walls. The doorway has a fanlight, the windows are sashes, and all the openings have flush brick wedge lintels.
Hill Farmhouse; 52.82260°N 1.12765°W	—	Early 19th century	A farmhouse in red brick on a plinth, with dentilled eaves and a slate roof. There are two storeys and attics, a double depth plan, and three bays. The central doorway has a moulded surround, a fanlight and a pediment on brackets, and the windows are cross-casements.
Silver Birches; 52.81347°N 1.14266°W	—	Early 19th century	A red brick house with a tile roof, three storeys and four bays. The doorway has a moulded surround, a decorative frieze and a cornice, and the windows are sashes, those in the lower two floors with wedge lintels.
