= Costock =

Village and civil parish in Nottinghamshire, England

Coordinates: 52.83191°N 1.14507°W

- Village and civil parish
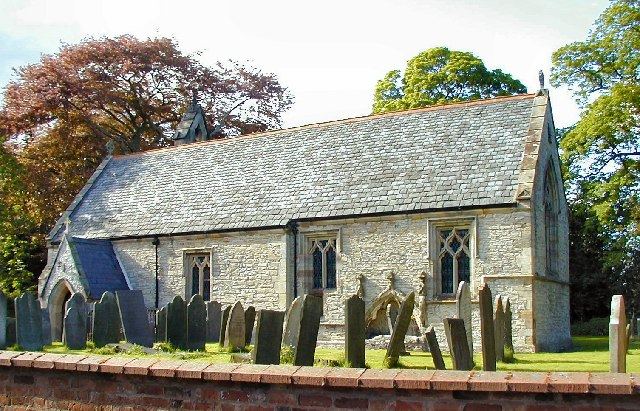
- St Giles' Church

- Location within Nottinghamshire
- Interactive map of Costock
- Area: 2.7 sq mi (7.0 km^{2})
- Population: 645 (2021 Census)
  - Density: 239/sq mi (92/km^{2})
- OS grid reference: SK 574264
  - London: 100 mi (160 km) SSE
- District: Rushcliffe
- Shire county: Nottinghamshire
- Region: East Midlands
- Country: England
- Sovereign state: United Kingdom
- Post town: LOUGHBOROUGH
- Postcode district: LE12
- Dialling code: 01509
- Police: Nottinghamshire
- Fire: Nottinghamshire
- Ambulance: East Midlands
- UK Parliament: Rushcliffe
- Website: costockparishcouncil.org.uk

Costock is a village and civil parish in the Rushcliffe district of Nottinghamshire, England. The population of the civil parish was estimated at 664 in 1998, and reported at the 2011 census as 621. There were 645 residents counted at the 2021 census. Although in Nottinghamshire, Costock's closest town is Loughborough in Leicestershire.

== Amenities ==
Costock has a Church of England primary school. St Giles's Church, built in 1350, stands back from the main street of the village. The Anglican Community of the Holy Cross has had a small convent at Highfields, Cotham, since 2011.

== Transport ==
Costock lies next to the main A60, Nottingham to Loughborough road.

The No. 9 bus service between Nottingham and Loughborough operates at least once an hour, seven days a week. It is operated by Kinchbus. East Midlands Airport lies 10 miles away.

== 18th-century visitor ==
The German author and traveller K. P. Moritz stayed the night while on a walking tour of England in 1782, however his diary erroneously refers to the village as Castol: "At Castol there were three inns close to each other, in which, to judge only from the outside of the houses, little but poverty was to be expected. In the one at which I at length stopped there was only a landlady, a sick butcher, and a sick carter, both of whom had come to stay the night. This assemblage of sick persons gave me the idea of an hospital, and depressed me still more. I felt some degree of fever, was very restless all night, and so I kept my bed very late the next morning, until the woman of the house came and aroused me by saying she had been uneasy on my account. And now I formed the resolution to go to Leicester in the post-coach."

== Neighbouring villages ==
- Bunny
- East Leake
- Rempstone
- Wysall

== See also ==
- Listed buildings in Costock
