= BPB plc =

British building materials business

BPB Ltd
- Type: Subsidiary
- Founded: 1917; 109 years ago
- Headquarters: East Leake, England
- Products: Plasterboard
- Parent: Saint-Gobain
- Website: www.bpb.com

BPB Ltd (formerly BPB plc) (British Plaster Board) was a British building materials business. It was a constituent of the FTSE 100 Index prior to its acquisition by Saint-Gobain of France in 2005.

Founded in April 1917 as British Plaster Board Limited, the company was an early European manufacturer of plasterboard. Sales slowly grew during the interwar period, permitting the company to be floated on the London Stock Exchange in 1932 and fuelling its expansion into the production of gypsum plaster from imported rock. Thereafter, BPB quickly became the dominant domestic producer, a status that was effectively finalised by the purchase of rival firm Gyproc Products Limited in 1944. International expansion proceeded during the early postwar year, having invested into South Africa, France, Canada and Sweden during the 1940s and 1950s. In the early 1970s, BPB set up the subsidiary BPB Industries (Instruments) to provide specialist instrumentation and borehole logging services. The 1980s and 1990s were marked by a series of acquisitions across both Europe and North America.

In March 2002, as a result of the company's acquisition of the US-based firm James Hardie Industries, BPB became the largest producer of plasterboard in the world. That same year, the firm, along with three other competitors, were fined by the European Commission for allegedly operating a cartel to control prices. During August 2005, the French company Saint-Gobain launched a hostile takeover bid; while BPB's board resisted this bid, it ultimately opted to concede control of the company to Saint-Gobain in exchange for a higher price.

== History ==
=== Inter-war period ===
The development of plasterboard (a sandwich of gypsum plaster between two sheets of paper) dates back to the late nineteenth century in the US. The first patent was granted in 1894. However, it was not until an American, Frank Culver, persuaded his new employer, Thomas McGhie and Sons, to buy a plasterboard plant from the US that plasterboard was introduced to Britain. A site was acquired at Wallasey Cheshire and building started in 1916. However, McGhie's shareholders could not supply sufficient funding and, in 1917, the plasterboard assets were sold to a new company, British Plaster Board Limited.

The British building industry was initially slow to adopt the new product. Assisted by the operation of a more modern plant that was purchased in 1927, sales gradually increased and, by 1932, the company was able to float on the London Stock Exchange. The additional capital from the floatation enabled BPB to build a new factory at Erith in 1934; this new plant had the capacity to manufacture the gypsum plaster (the core of the plasterboard product) and BPB began importing gypsum rock from Canada. This encouraged negotiations with other gypsum companies in Britain and a rapid series of take-overs followed over the next two years, which made BPB the dominant force in the industry. In particular, these included the Gotham Company with plaster works in the north of England, and The Gypsum Mines Limited, with its large gypsum mine at Mountfield, Sussex.

=== Post-war activities ===
In 1944, BPB acquired its large rival, Gyproc Products Limited. The postwar period saw extensive overseas investment through subsidiaries and associates. South Africa was the first investment (1946) followed by Placoplatre in France (1952), Western Gypsum of Canada (1954) and Sweden (1957). Following a geophysical survey conducted in 1963 that led to the internal development of borehole logging techniques, BPB opted to establish a new subsidiary, BPB Industries (Instruments), to develop and sell specialist instrumentation along with performing borehole logging services. During 1994, this division was rebranded as BPB Wireline Services Limited and subsequently divested.

During 1974, an investigation conducted by the Monopolies Commission observed that BPB's distribution practices, which had been oriented around indirect sales through selected builders merchants, ought to be reformed to permit customers to purchase directly from the company.

In 1987, BPB bought Rigips, a well-known brand in Austria, Germany, Italy and the Netherlands. In April 1996, it acquired Borgadts of Germany for £21 million. In June 1996, it bought Gypsum Industries of South Africa for £28 million. In October 1998, it purchased Gyproc of Scandinavia for £95 million, having already operated the Scancem joint venture together.

During the early 2000s, much of the company's growth was centred around the European market. In March 2000, BPB bought Heidelberger Dammsysteme of Germany, which made polystyrene insulation, for £22 million. In June 2000, it acquired the Celotex company of the US, which made ceiling tiles, for £230 million. In January 2001, it purchased Rawlplug Ltd. for £27 million. In October 2002, it acquired Gyproc Benelux of Belgium for £52 million. In March 2002, it acquired James Hardie Industries, a rival US-based manufacturer, for £245 million; one result of completing this transaction was that BPB became the world's largest producer of plasterboard at that time.

In November 2002, the European Commission fined four construction companies, including BPB, a combined value of £306 million, for allegedly forming a cartel to fix the price of plasterboard during the 1990s; BPB, which was fined €138.6 million over its involvement, had cooperated with the investigation. In December 2002, it launched an appeal against this ruling.

In May 2005, it was announced that BPB had recorded record sales of £287.5 million, up 29 per cent year-on-year from £222.8 million.

=== Takeover ===
Starting in May 1996, BPB operated a joint venture with the French company Saint-Gobain that produced glass fibre insulation. In July 2005, BPB rejected an offer of 675 pence per share issued by Saint-Gobain to purchase the company; one month later, a hostile takeover bid was launched by Saint-Gobain, which set an increased price of 720 pence per share. The board of BPB initially responded with measures to resist the takeover, which included the redistribution of £600 million to attract shareholders into backing their position. However, following a revised bid of 775 pence per share that valued the company at £3.9billion (US$6.7 billion), BPB elected to accept Saint-Gobain's offer in November 2005; regulatory clearance was received that same month.

== Operations ==
The company's subsidiary British Gypsum, which was the UK operating arm of the company, operates as a subsidiary of Saint-Gobain, with five manufacturing sites in Britain as of 2012.

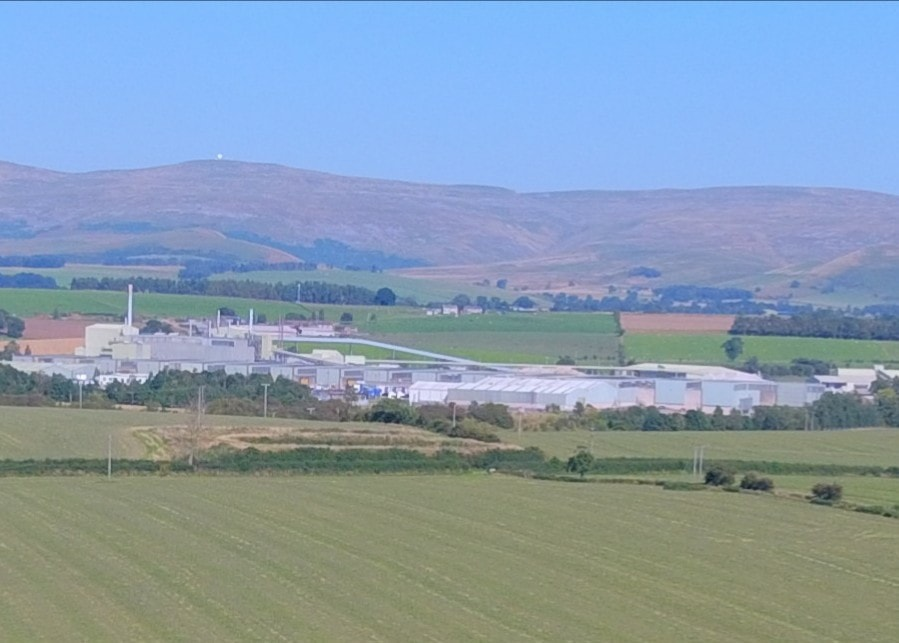
British Gypsum at Kirkby Thore
