= West Leake =

Village in Nottinghamshire, England

- Village and civil parish
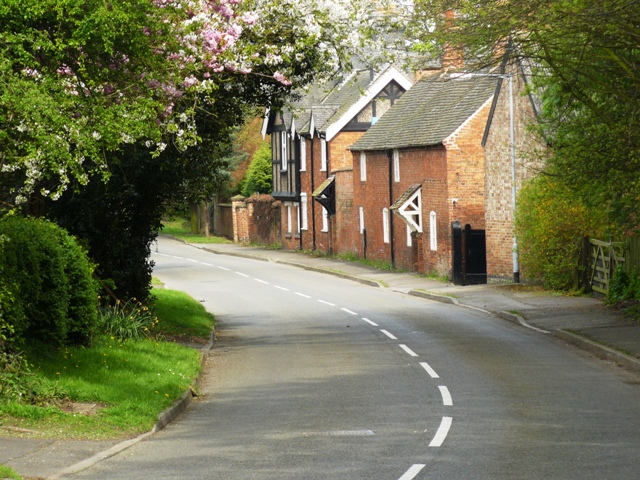
- Main Street

- Location within Nottinghamshire
- Interactive map of West Leake
- Area: 2.48 sq mi (6.4 km^{2})
- Population: 129 (2021)
  - Density: 52/sq mi (20/km^{2})
- OS grid reference: SK 526264
  - London: 100 mi (160 km) SSE
- District: Rushcliffe
- Shire county: Nottinghamshire
- Region: East Midlands
- Country: England
- Sovereign state: United Kingdom
- Post town: LOUGHBOROUGH
- Postcode district: LE12
- Dialling code: 01509
- Police: Nottinghamshire
- Fire: Nottinghamshire
- Ambulance: East Midlands
- UK Parliament: Rushcliffe

West Leake (/liːk/) is a small conservation village and civil parish in the Rushcliffe district of Nottinghamshire.

== Description ==
=== Setting ===
The parish of West Leake is 1,589 acres (643 ha; 6.43 km^{2}; 2.483 sq mi) in total. The neighbouring parishes include Gotham, to the north; East Leake, to the east; Normanton on Soar and Sutton Bonington, to the south; and Kingston on Soar, to the west.

The Conservation Area Appraisal and Management Plan for West Leake, created by Rushcliffe Borough Council, describes the setting of the village as follows:

West Leake sits on the winding country road from East Leake to Sutton Bonington and has a very simple plan of one main street. It enjoys a unity of form and has a rural feel to it. The village is surrounded by agricultural land, with the village of Sutton Bonington further to the west and East Leake to the East. Further to the south is the A6006 which links the village to the main arterial routes the A60 and the A6.

West Leake stands on relatively flat ground, gently sloping down to the east of the village, at between 40 and 50 metres above sea level. The main rock type below the village is Branscombe Mudstone formation within the Mercia Mudstone Group, which gives the topsoil a clay nature.

White's Directory of Nottinghamshire, written in 1853, describes West Leake as follows:

Leake (West) is a small village and parish, one mile west of East leake, and ten miles south south west of Nottingham. It has 190 inhabitants and 1,380 acres of land, all belonging to Lord Middleton, except the rectory house, with ten acres of glebe.

John Throsby, writing during 1790 in his new edition of Robert Thoroton's Antiquities of Nottinghamshire, describes West Leake as:

THE Lordship of the former contains 2000 acres of land, old inclosure. The principal proprietors are Lord Middleton, and — Bird, Esq. The former I believe is lord of the manor. The village consists of about 34 dwellings, one of which is the remains of an old manor-house, a part of it only is inhabited by a villager. The last family, I am told, who lived in it, was that of Chadwick.

=== Local geography ===
The Victoria County History in Nottinghamshire describes West Leake's geography as follows:

The portion of West Leake along the Kingston brook is alluvium with sand and gravel. To the north east and west of the village are areas of gypsum, with clay and limestone in the eastern part. The village lies about 150 feet above sea level. The land rises to over 300 ft to the north-east and 200 ft to the west at Moulter Hill. In the north the West Leake Hills are 200 to 300 ft. To the east Fox Hill reaches 290 ft. The Kingston brook flows from east to west through the parish, just south of the village. It is joined by other small streams from the north. It flows on to Kingston on Soar where it joins the river Soar. There is a large area of woodland, Crownend Wood and Leake New Wood, to the north of West Leake. In the north-east there are smaller areas of woodland at Oak Wood, Ash Spinney, Crow Wood, Fir Dale Plantation and Foxhill Wood. On the west side near Moulter Hill is Scotland Plantation.

=== Population ===
The 2011 census records the population of West Leake as 143, this fell to 129 at the 2021 census.

The table below displays the historic number of households, families and people living in West Leake:

Year	Households/families	Population
1674	22	-
1743	28	-
1801	-	171
1841	-	208
1853	-	190
1861	37	171
1901	-	112
1971	40	110
2001	-	128

== Toponymy ==
The origin of Leake appears to be Laeke (Old Norse – brook or stream), and is consistent with West Leake's position near Kingston Brook.

== History ==
=== Domesday Book ===
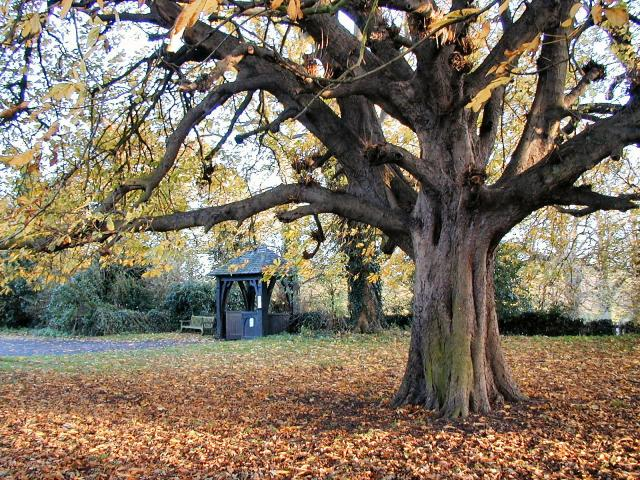
The lych gate and chestnut tree on the green

One of the earliest mentions of West Leake is in the Domesday Book recorded as 'Leche'. The Domesday Book listing is divided into four holdings which encompass what are today East and West Leake. The first property is listed to Henry de Ferrers by the King as Tenant in Chief, and Lord. Ferrers portion was inventoried with 16 villagers. 16 freemen. 1 priest. It included land for 6 ploughlands; 4 lord's plough teams and 17 men's plough teams. Other resources listed include; 50 acres in meadow, Woodland 2 * 1 furlongs. 1 mill, 1 church. The holding was valued at £7 to the lord in 1086.

The second listing is for Tenant-in-chief Roger of Bully (Busli) with his lord Arnold (de Bully), valued to the lord in 1086 £0.5. The holding was inventoried to include 2 villagers, land for 0.5 ploughlands, 2 lord's plough teams. 0.5 men's plough teams, and included 8 acres of meadow.

Third is a listing for Count Robert of Mortain, Tenant-in-chief and Lord in 1086. The holding has taxable value of 0.3 geld units, but no other details are shown. The last listing has taxable value 0.1 geld units, and includes 2 freemen, land for 0.5 ploughlands, 1 men's plough team. Robert son of William is listed as Tenant in Chief and Lord in 1086.

=== Economic history ===
==== Agriculture ====
In 1752 West Leake was home to 12 farm holdings, the largest of which was 300 acres. By 1870 there were 14 farm holdings, with eight of these farms consisting of less than 50 acres. In both 1900 and 1925 the number of farm holdings was listed as 11. By 1960 the number of holdings had increased to 13. Since 2010 only Manor Farm, which was built between 1870 and 1882, remains.

==== Other industries ====
From around the mid 18th century until the early 20th century basket making took place in the village. Many of the baskets were sold in London, with some being sold to Parliament. The village, in the late 19th century, had a "blacksmith, butcher, joiner and stone mason". The village has also historically had two post offices; the first opened in 1891, but later closed. The second post office was opened in 1896, but closed in 1977.

=== Religious history ===
==== Background ====
The Victoria County History in Nottinghamshire describes West Leake's religious background as follows:

There was a priest and a church at Leake in 1086. At that time there was no distinction between West or Little Leake and East or Great Leake. By c.1200 there were two churches. The one at West Leake was dedicated to St Helena and the one at East Leake to St Leonard. The latter was later changed to St Mary.

During the 14th century West Leake, a closed village, became less important while East Leake, an open village, grew. However, the two churches belonged to the same benefice and were not divided until 1876. Henry Balfour Hamilton became the first rector of West Leake in 1882 after the death of the previous incumbent. ...

When the benefice was separated into two in 1876, Lord Belper purchased the advowson of West Leake. In 1933 West Leake was united with Kingston on Soar and Ratcliffe on Soar. For some time the rector of Gotham was also priest-in-charge of the combined benefice. In 1992 West Leake became part of the East Leake benefice, which consists of East Leake, West Leake, Stanford on Soar, Costock and Rempstone. The patronage of the united benefice, at the time of writing, is held jointly by the bishop, the Southwell & Nottingham Diocesan Board of Patronage, Lord Belper and Sidney Sussex College, Cambridge.

==== Other church denominations ====
The Victoria County History in Nottinghamshire describes West Leake's other church denominations as follows:

In 1603 no nonconformists were reported to be in West or East Leake, but in 1676 there was one Dissenter in West Leake. Between 1689 and 1698 Samuel Wilkinson’s house was licensed for occasional nonconformist meetings at Leake where John Whitlock, Richard Bateson and John Hardy were preachers. The number of hearers was claimed to be 113, with four gentlemen and most of the rest yeomen and farmers. In 1851 it was reported that a group of 19 General Baptists met for evening worship in a house and a group of 55 Wesleyan Methodists met for evening worship, also in a house. There has never been a purpose-built nonconformist meeting house in West Leake although many of the surrounding parishes had both Baptist and Methodist chapels. ...

In 1603 no Catholics were reported in West or East Leake. In 1693 the churchwardens presented Mr John Wyld for being a recusant. He was presented again in 1694 when he was described as schoolmaster. There has never been a [post-reformation] Roman Catholic place of worship in West Leake: the nearest church is at East Leake.

== Heritage ==
=== Listed buildings ===
==== St. Helena's Church (Grade II*) ====
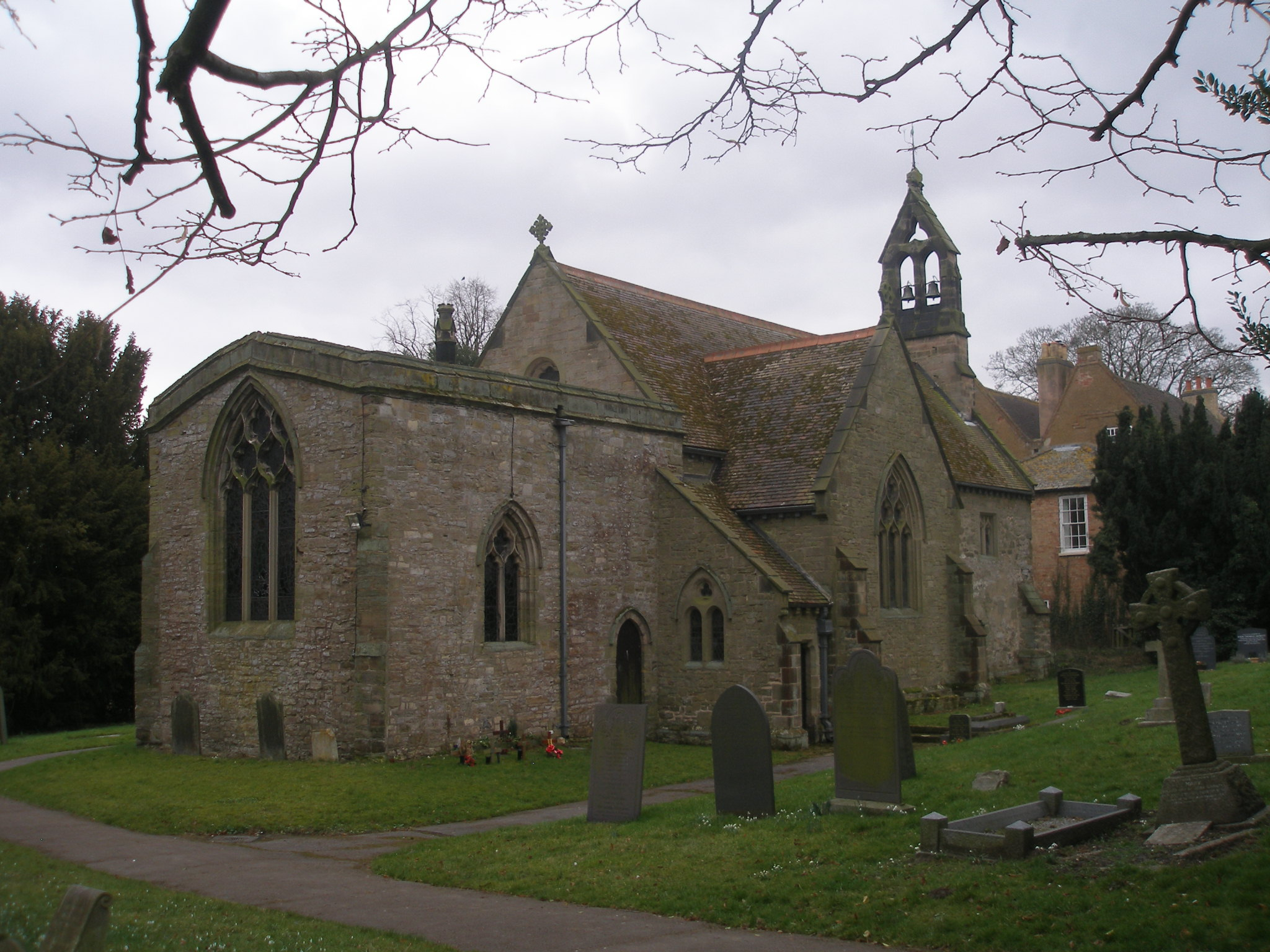
St. Helena's Church (Grade II*)

The parish church is St. Helena's Church, West Leake. The church was designated Grade II* on 13 October 1966.

A church has been located on the site of St. Helena's since Saxon times. The oldest part of the present church is the Norman north wall which dates back to the 12th century. The nave is noted for being unusually long. The chancel was enlarged and the south aisle built, to create a chapel, in the 14th century. The church does not have a tower but does have a 19th century gabled west bellcote which houses two bells. The gabled south porch dates back to the 19th century. The church was extensively restored and the organ chamber rebuilt in 1878.

The church has a two manual pipe organ by J.M. Grunwell of Derby, dating from 1878.

White's Directory of Nottinghamshire, written in 1853, describes St. Helena's Church as follows:

The church is a low, ancient edifice, dedicated to St Helen, with chancel, side aisle, and ivy mantled belfry, in which are two bells. The rectory is a pleasant mansion, occupied by the Rev. John Bateman, and stands at the west end of the church. In 1850 a school was erected for the use of the parish. The feast is held on the Sunday after Martinmas.

John Throsby, writing during 1790 in his new edition of Robert Thoroton's Antiquities of Nottinghamshire, describes St. Helena's Church as:

The Church, which is dedicated to St. Helen, has a nave, side aisles, two bells, and is a low structure. In the chancel wall is a mutilated figure of a Lady, in stone.—Here is a monument to the memory of Thomas Mansfield, Esq. once lord of the manor; he died in 1741–2. Evelyn, (it says) his nephew, had gratitude for his memory, and erected it. Edward Bigland, Rector, died in 1650.—Thomas Mansfield, Esq. died in 1741. Another Thomas Mansfield, Esq, has a monument to his memory, who died in 1706.— George Chadwick, Esq. died in 1722.—Robert Hemington, M. A. died in 1774, aged 64: He was son of Lieut. Col. Hemington, of the first Regiment of Foot Guards.— In a nich of the north wall, near the pulpit, lies an old figure in stone, well preserved; and near the door is one seemingly much older. The monument for Richard Mansfield, mentioned by Thoroton, remains. The arms are over the monument (see Willoughby.) In this church is a light little font; but there stands, near it, some offensive lumber. The earliest Register begins in 1616. Bap. the five first years 18, buried 20.—The last five years bap. 21, buried 14. Increased bap. 3, decreased burials 6.

==== Other listed buildings ====
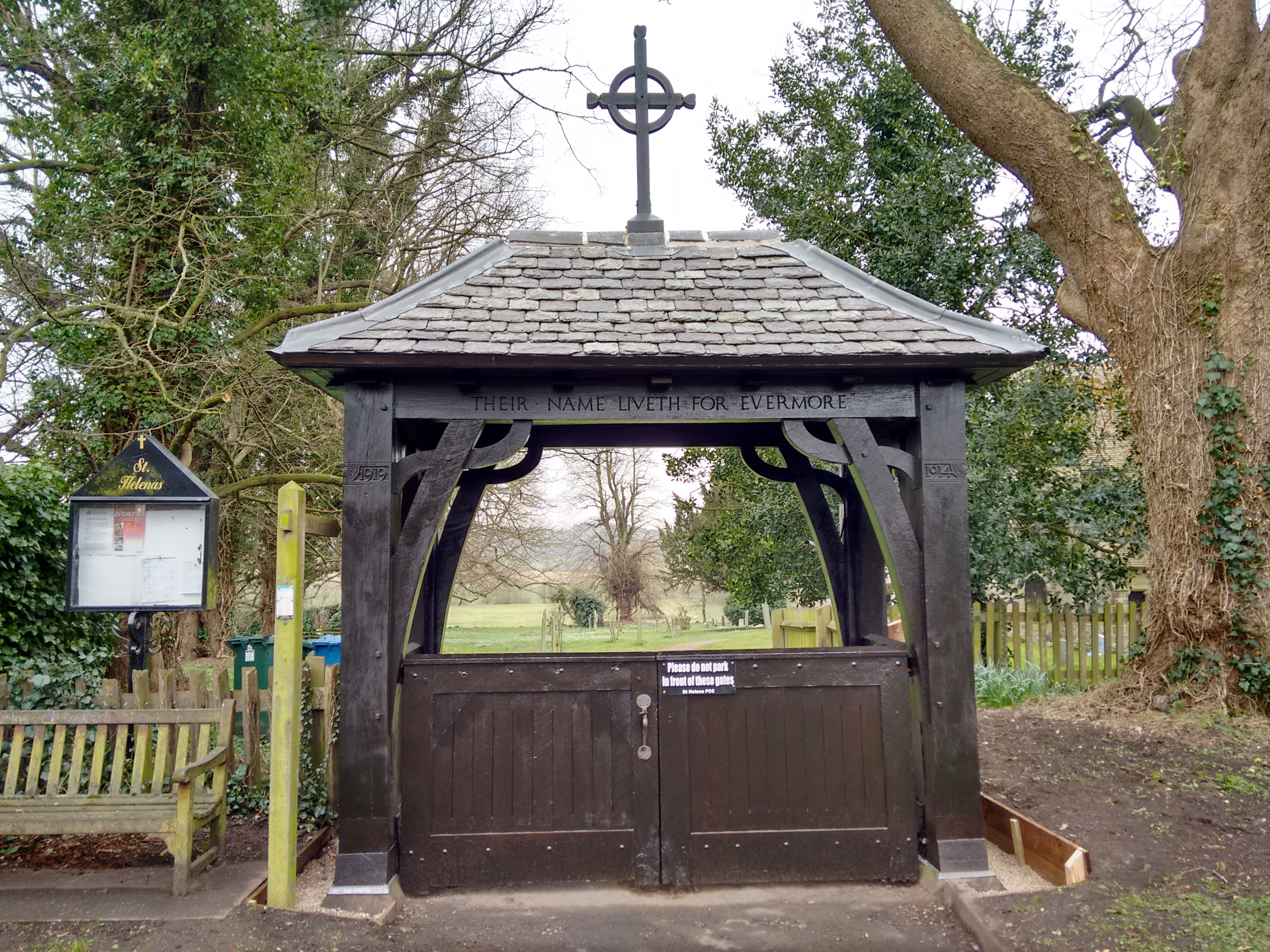
The lych gate (Grade II) renovated March 2015 at the churchyard entrance of St. Helena's Church

In addition to St. Helena's Church there are four other listed structures in West Leake, all Grade II listed: 55, Main Street; Lychgate at Entrance to Churchyard of Church of St Helena; Sundial in Churchyard of Church of St Helena, Single Metre South of the Chancel; and The Old Rectory.

The lych gate at the entrance to the churchyard of St. Helena's church dates back to 1919 and serves as a World War I memorial; it is a timber construction with a roof of Swithland slate.

The Old Rectory is dated 1723; the emblem of the Stanhope family is thought to be visible on the west wall. White's Directory of Nottinghamshire, written in 1853, describes the rectory as "a pleasant mansion". When, in 1933, West Leake was united with Kingston on Soar and Ratcliffe on Soar, the rectory was sold into private ownership.

=== Other heritage ===
==== Former school (current village hall) ====
A school was built in 1850 by the owner of the village Lord Belper, of the neighbouring parish Kingston on Soar. It was noted by local writers that until the Elementary Education Act 1880 absenteeism was great as children stayed away to labour with their parents. Local writers state that Lady Belper, concerned with the poor living standards of children in the village, provided bread and cheese in the school.

The school still operated in 1895, but by 1904 children in the village attended schools outside the village. In 1966 the school was donated to the village, by Lord Belper, for use as a village hall.

==== Former post offices ====
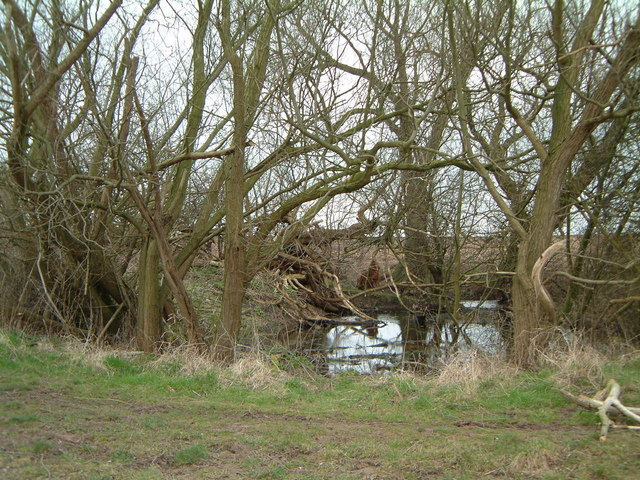
Dew pond. 52°50′11″N 1°12′57″W

The village has historically had two post offices. The first post office, located at the junction of Main Street and Dark Lane, was opened in 1891, but soon closed. A second post office, located next to the school in a thatched building, was opened in 1896, but later closed in 1977.

==== The Star Inn ====
There is a public house called The Star which is situated just outside the village, on the other side of the Kingston Brook on Melton Lane (and therefore in the parish of Sutton Bonington). The Victoria County History for Sutton Bonington states that "[i]t was also known as Pit House because it was used by miners from the gypsum ‘pits’."

==== Dew pond ====
A dew pond is situated on the hill above the village towards West Leake hills.

== Local government and elections ==
=== Parliamentary elections ===
The Member of Parliament for the parliamentary constituency of Rushcliffe is Kenneth Clarke, of the Conservative party, who has held the seat since 1970. Ken Clarke stood for reelection at the 2017 General Election and was reelected with a reduced majority of 8,010. The voter turnout for Rushcliffe was 78%, which was the ninth highest in the country.

=== Local government ===
==== County council ====
For Nottinghamshire County Council elections the parish comes within the Leake & Ruddington electoral ward, which has two council seats. The most recent election was in May 2017, when Andy Brown and Reg Adair, both of the Conservative party, won the two available seats.

==== Borough council ====
For the election of a councillor to Rushcliffe Borough Council, the parish forms part of the Leake ward, which has three council seats. The most recent election was on 7 May 2015 when Ronald Hetherington, Margaret Males and John Thurman, all of the Conservative party, won the three available seats. The next Borough election will be on 2 May 2019.

==== Parish meeting ====
West Leake does not have a parish council, but instead has a parish meeting. Meetings take place "Annually in May".

== Amenities ==
The Village Hall is located on Main Street and serves as a social amenity. The building is managed by a charity called West Leake Village Hall.

There is 6:00pm Book of Common Prayer Evensong service at St. Helena's Church every second and fourth Sunday of the month; there is also a 6:00pm service of Holy Communion on the third Sunday.

The nearest pub is The Star, known locally as The Pit House, which is just located in the neighbouring civil parish of Sutton Bonington.

West Leake has one postbox, located on Main Street.

== Gallery ==
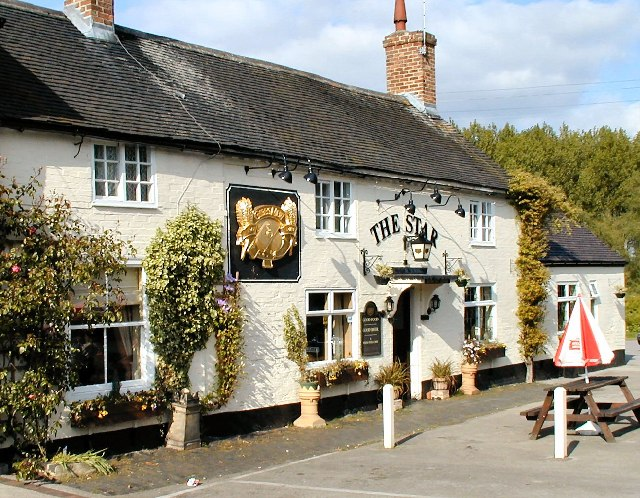
The Star pub (actually located in the civil parish of Sutton Bonington)

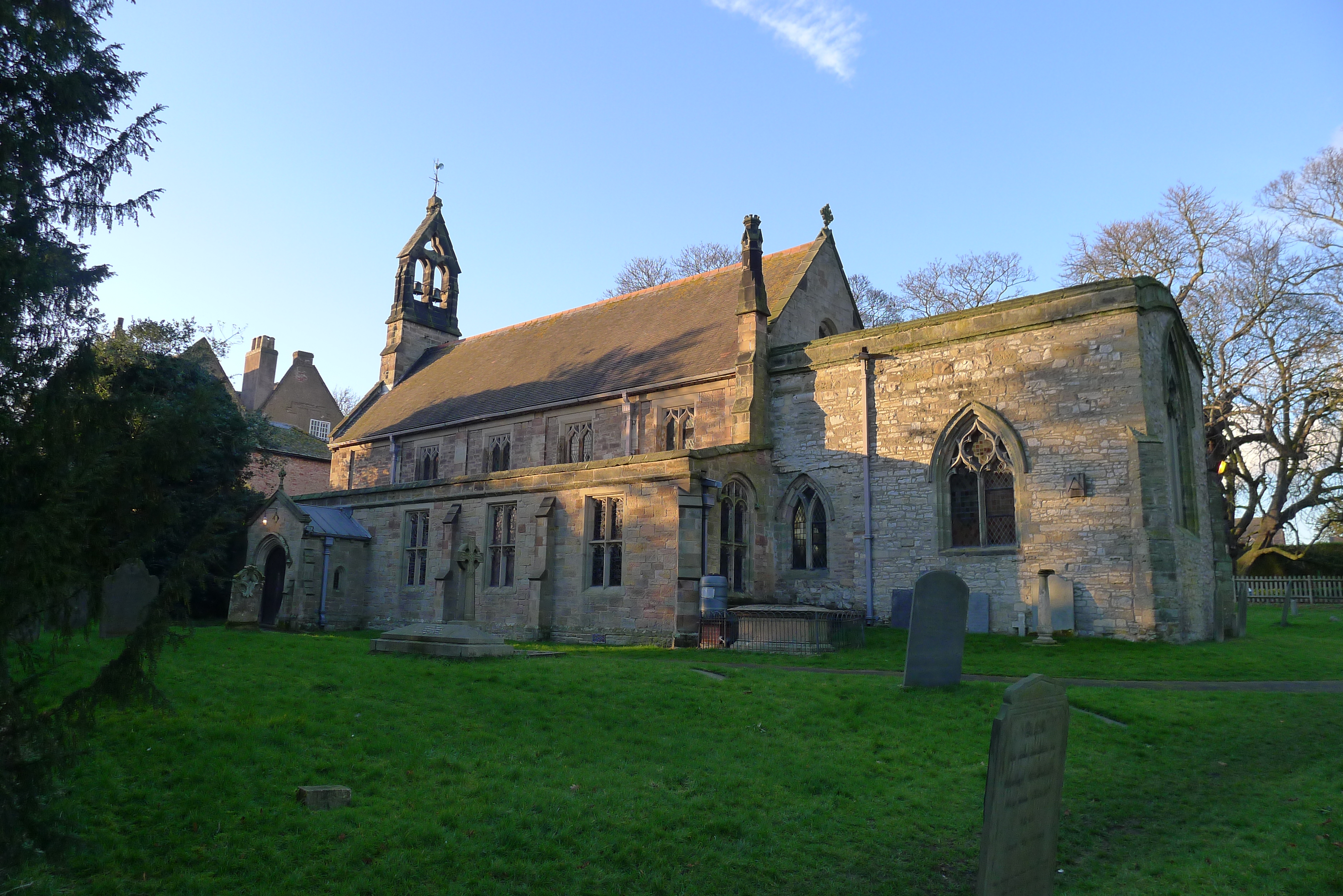
St. Helena's Church (Grade II*)

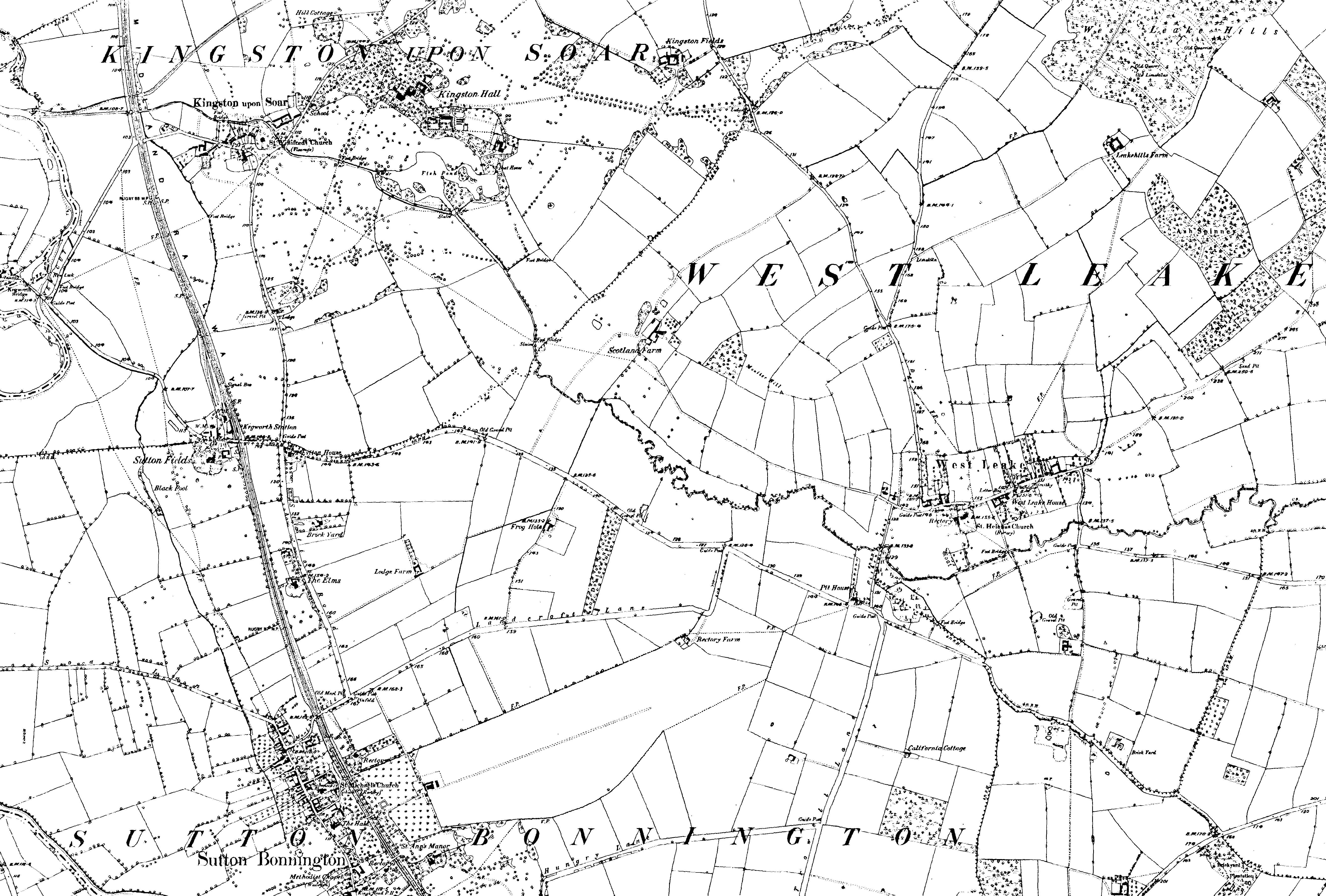
An old map of West Leake

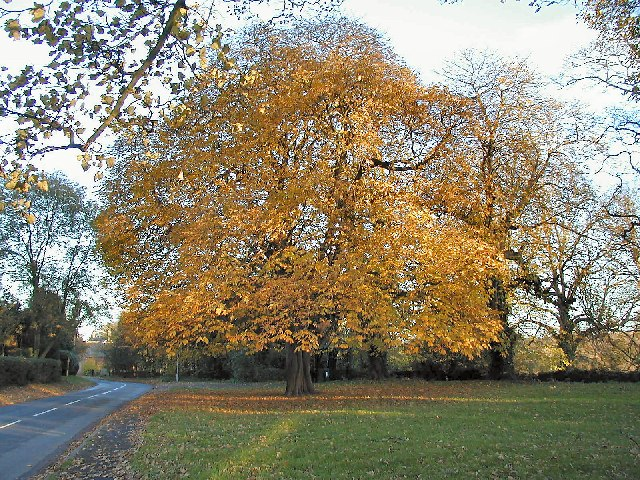
The chestnut tree on the village green

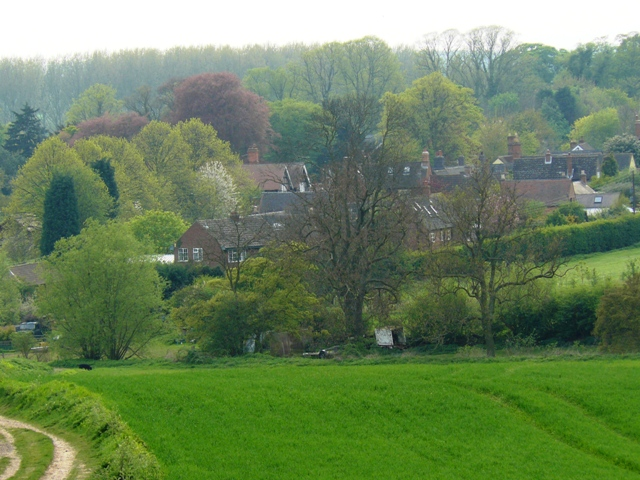
Fields surrounding West Leake
