= East Leake Academy =

Academy in East Leake, Nottinghamshire, England

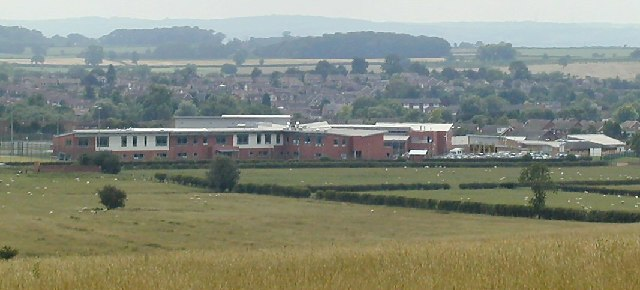

Location
- Lantern Lane; East Leake, Nottinghamshire, LE12 6QN; England; 52°50′10″N 1°10′24″W

Information
- Type: Academy
- Motto: We empower. We respect. We care.
- Established: 1956
- Department for Education URN: 138964 Tables
- Ofsted: Reports
- Chair of Governors: John Dickens
- Principal: Tom Reid
- Gender: Coeducational
- Age: 11 to 18
- Enrolment: 995
- Houses: Harrier, Kestrel, Osprey, Eagle
- Colours: Green, red, blue, yellow (respectively)
- Website: East Leake Academy

East Leake Academy is an academy located in East Leake in the Rushcliffe area of Nottinghamshire, England and a member of the Diverse Academies Trust. The school describes itself as specialising in information communication technology (ICT) and mathematics. The current principal is Tom Reid. The school has a student capacity of 1386. In September 2003, the school moved into a £20m new building, built with Private Finance Initiative funding, and rented from Alfred McAlpine Business Services. The school shares its location with a leisure centre and Lantern Lane Primary & Nursery School. In September 2012, the school was changed from a comprehensive to an academy after successfully earning academy status in 2010, in September 2012 the name was also changed from Harry Carlton Comprehensive School to East Leake Academy.

== Results ==
2025, 76% of all students achieving a grade 4 and above in their GCSEs. For A-Levels, 97.2% pass rate with students achieving an average grade score of C+, with 23.4% of top performers achieving A* and A grades.

2024, 72% of all grades were a grade 4 or above, with 63% of students achieving five or more GCSEs at grade 4 or above, including maths and English. 4% of grades were at grade 9 with almost 10% at grade 8+. For A-Levels, 96% pass rate with students achieving an average grade score of C+, with 17.5% of top performers achieving A* and A grades.

2023, 69% of grades were a grade 4 or above with 60% of students achieving five or more GCSEs at grade 4 or above, including maths and English. 10% of all grades were a grade 8 or 9. For A-Levels, an average grade score of B and nearly 30% of students achieved top A* and A grades. Students achieved 76% A*-C grades, with 54% of students achieving A* to B.

2022, 67% of students achieved a standard pass rate of 5 or more GCSEs at a grade 4 or above including English and maths, with an 86% pass rate in English. For A-Levels, an average grade score of B and well over a third of students achieved top A* and A grades.

== History ==
The school was designed by Donald Gibson, the county architect, to accommodate 300 pupils. It was intended to reflect its rural location and allowed for the school to keep its own livestock. It was opened on 27 July 1957 by Brigadier Martin Redmayne, DSO, TD, PC. The school was then called the East Leake County Secondary School. The first head was Mr Tyler.

A team from the school won a national competition in 2001 to predict UK base interest rates organised by the Bank of England. The school received £10,000.

The school was rebuilt in 2002 as part of a private finance initiative. At that time it was named after Harry Carlton. Before this the school had been flooded three times in one year.
