= East Leake =

Village in South Nottinghamshire, England

Coordinates: 52.832°N 1.177°W

- Village and civil parish
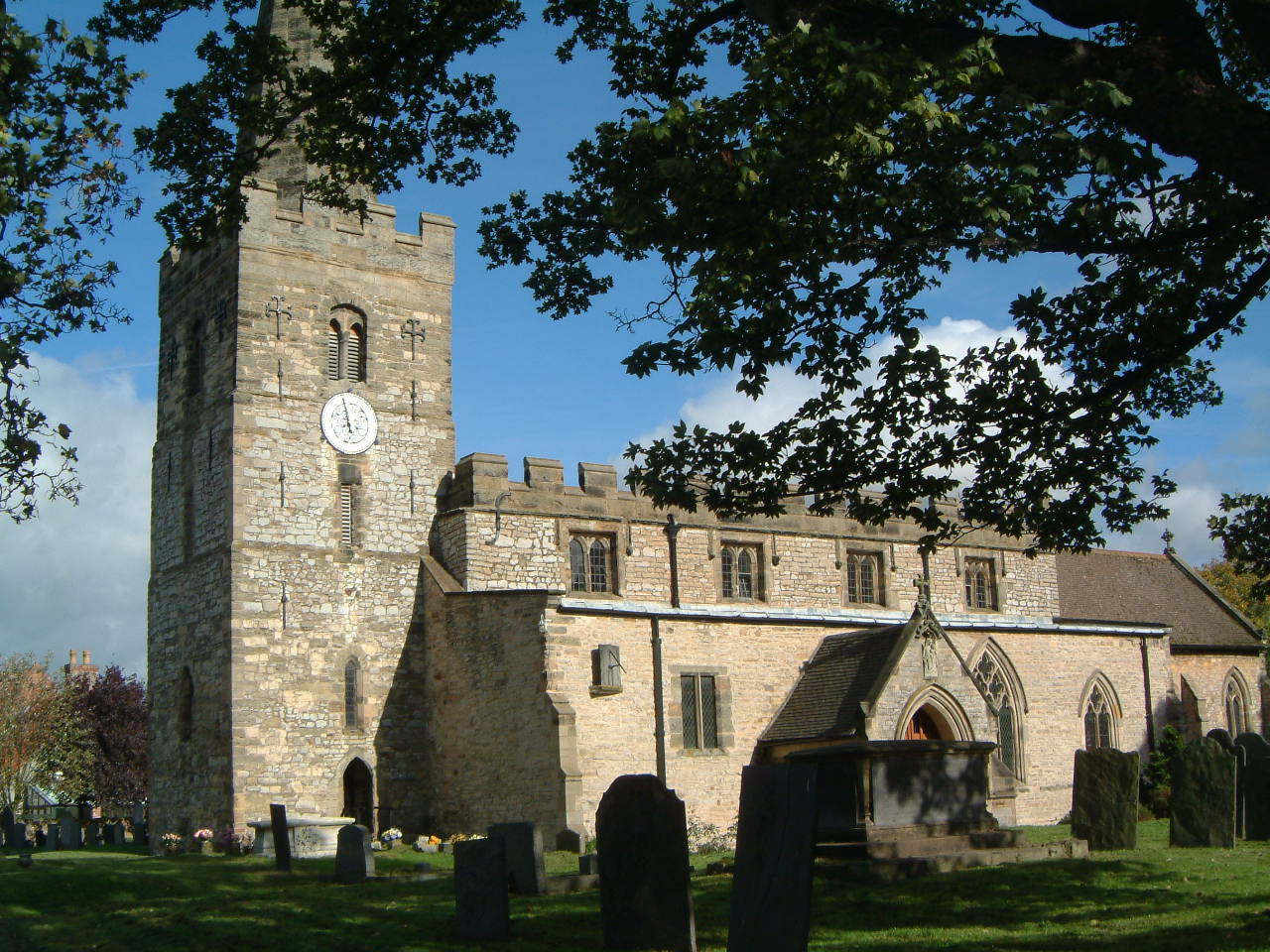
- St Mary's Church

- Location within Nottinghamshire
- Interactive map of East Leake
- Area: 3.94 sq mi (10.2 km^{2})
- Population: 8,553 (2021)
  - Density: 2,171/sq mi (838/km^{2})
- OS grid reference: SK 55440 26406
  - London: 100 mi (160 km) SSE
- District: Rushcliffe
- Shire county: Nottinghamshire
- Region: East Midlands
- Country: England
- Sovereign state: United Kingdom
- Post town: LOUGHBOROUGH
- Postcode district: LE12
- Dialling code: 01509
- Police: Nottinghamshire
- Fire: Nottinghamshire
- Ambulance: East Midlands
- UK Parliament: Rushcliffe
- Website: www.east-leake.gov.uk

East Leake (/liːk/) is a large village and civil parish in the Rushcliffe district of Nottinghamshire, England, although its closest town and postal address is Loughborough in Leicestershire. Census data from 2021 shows that the village now has a population of 8,553. The village has always straddled the Sheepwash Brook. Kingston Brook also runs through the village. Near the centre of the village is the historic St. Mary's Church, built in the 11th century, which Sheepwash Brook flows past, and an old ford, which provided access to the pinfold. The church has six bells.

The Treaty of Leake was signed in 1318 by King Edward II and his baronial opponents.

British Gypsum, a plasterboard manufacturer, has its headquarters in the village. The mining of gypsum locally began from medieval times but modern operations began in 1914, with manufacturing of plasterboard starting in 1917.

== Name ==
The origin of Leake appears to be Laeke (Old Norse – brook or stream), and is consistent with East Leake's position in the heart of the Danelaw, which had various forms over time before becoming "Leake". One of the earliest mentions of East Leake is in the Domesday Book of 1086, where it is recorded as "Leche". The name comes from the Anglo-Saxon word meaning wet land, since the village lies on the Kingston Brook, a tributary of the River Soar.

== History ==
Settlement in the village's vicinity dates back to at least the Bronze Age; an archaeological survey at a local gravel quarry found evidence of Bronze Age burial grounds and Iron Age constructions. Roman activity in the area is evidenced by a hoard of coins dating back to the reign of Commodus found at the Rushcliffe Halt railway station in the north of the village. The village was founded by Anglo-Saxon settlers at some point during the sixth or seventh centuries and was given the name Lecche, which meant wet or moist land, in reference to the meadows by the Kingston Brook. It is around this time that the Kingdom of Mercia underwent conversion from paganism to Christianity and the first church is thought to have been built in the village; a wooden structure where St Mary's Church stands today. Viking activity in the area began during the ninth century and the village was part of the territory ceded to the Danes by Alfred the Great, which later formed the Danelaw. Numerous place names in the area thus have Scandinavian origins.

During the reign of Edward the Confessor, the landholders in the village were Godric, possibly Godric the Sheriff, and Siward, possibly the Earl of Northumbria. Following the Norman Conquest, ownership of the lands was transferred to Roger de Busli and Henry de Ferrers, both companions of William the Conqueror during the invasion. The Domesday Book of 1086 recorded thirty-eight individuals in the village, giving a total resident population of around two hundred, as only heads of households were recorded.

The Treaty of Leake, an agreement of peace between King Edward II and his cousin Thomas, 2nd Earl of Lancaster, was signed in the village in 1318.

A skirmish took place in the village in September 1644 during the English Civil War between garrisons of Cavaliers from Ashby-de-la-Zouch and Roundheads from Leicester. The Royalists of Ashby were defeated and lost eight men killed and sixty captured.

Distiller and philanthropist John Bley (1674–1731) was born in East Leake and used the profits from his London-based business to fund the construction of a school in the village, which stood on the site of the modern Brookside Primary School. Upon his death, Bley left money to every resident of the village and was buried on the grounds of St Mary's Church, where his tomb still stands.

Commercial and industrial activity grew in the village during the nineteenth century, with basket weaving and lace-making providing income for residents. Gypsum mining had been taking place in the area since mediaeval times, and production of plaster began in the village in the 1880s. East Leake later became the headquarters of British Gypsum, which continues to employ residents of the village today.

== Demographics ==
The population of East Leake has grown sharply in recent years due to the expansion of the village. Office for National Statistics census data recorded a population of 6,108 in 2001, 6,337 in 2011 and 8,553 at the most recent census in 2021. According to 2021 census data, 96.2% of the village's population are White, above the national figure of 83.0% and the Rushcliffe local authority figure of 89.7%. The village is 1.4% Asian, 0.3% Black, 0.2% of other ethnicities, and 1.8% of the population identified as Mixed. 95.0% of the population were born in the United Kingdom.

41.5% of the village's households are classified as being deprived in at least one of the four census metrics of education, employment, health or housing, compared to an England and Wales figure of 51.7%. 41.2% of the village's adult population have a degree-level qualification (Level 4 or above), compared to 33.8% nationally.

== Local amenities ==
The village is home to four schools, three primary and one secondary. Brookside Primary School has its origins in the John Bley Free School, which was established in 1724. Lantern Lane Primary School and Millside Spencer Academy opened in 1953 and 2022, respectively, accommodating the growth in the village's population. East Leake Academy, formerly Harry Carlton Comprehensive School, was established in 1957 and serves East Leake and the surrounding villages. The school was rebuilt in 2002 and shares its location with the village's leisure centre and swimming pool. The academy has been rated "good" by Ofsted and achieved above the national average at GCSE-level in 2024 with a 72% pass rate, compared to 67% in England as a whole.

The village centre contains a number of small shops and pubs mostly situated on Main Street and Gotham Road, as well as a Co-op supermarket. The village is served by a Post Office branch, a Nottinghamshire Fire and Rescue Service station, a GP surgery and a library. 2nd East Leake Scouts, part of The Scout Association, is also based in the village.

The village is also home to a variety of sporting clubs. East Leake Cricket Club plays in the South Nottinghamshire Cricket League and East Leake Robins Football Club plays in Division One of the Nottinghamshire Senior League. There are also clubs for rugby union, basketball, badminton and kickboxing. The village is the site of an 18-hole golf course at Rushcliffe Golf Club, which was formed in 1909.

The village hosts five organised churches, Church of England, Roman Catholic, Methodist, Baptist and Evangelical. The Anglican church, St Mary's, is within the Diocese of Southwell and Nottingham, and originates from the Norman period and is Grade I listed, indicating that it is of "exceptional" historic, architectural or cultural interest. The village contains a number of other listed buildings at Grade II, including 17th and 18th century cottages and a First World War memorial.

== Transport ==
East Leake lies close to the A60 and A6006 major roads and within five miles of the M1 motorway. Nottingham City Transport operate a frequent (15 minutes at peak times) bus service (No. 1) between Nottingham and Loughborough under the "South Notts" brand.

An East Leake railway station used to exist, on the Great Central Railway. That line was controversially broken up in the Beeching Axe of the 1960s. A spur was installed to connect with the Midland Main Line at Loughborough through East Leake to Ruddington to allow freight trains to travel to British Gypsum's works and to the MoD ordnance depot at Ruddington, but later fell into disuse. More recently this stretch has been re-opened as a heritage line running steam and heritage diesel locos between Ruddington, Rushcliffe Halt (which is located next to the Gypsum works at the northern end of East Leake) whilst work to reunify the line continues with the preserved Loughborough to Leicester North Great Central Railway as of 2025.

== Geography and ecology ==
In 2017 European bee-eaters nested at CEMEX quarry, attracting thousands of bird-watchers. The European bee-eater is a colourful bird usually found in southern Europe, and seldom nests in the United Kingdom.

== Notable people ==
- Edward Bigland (c. 1620 – 1704), lawyer and politician who served as a Member of Parliament for Nottingham. Bigland's father was a rector of East Leake.
- Albert Hallam (1869 – 1940), cricketer who played for Nottinghamshire and won the 1907 County Championship. Hallam was born in East Leake.
- Captain Alexander Roulstone, MC (1890 – 1965), World War I flying ace credited with eight aerial victories. Roulstone settled in East Leake after the war.
- Oliver Redgate, DFC (1898 – 1929), World War I flying ace credited with sixteen aerial victories. Redgate settled in East Leake after the war.
- Peter Such (born 1964), cricketer and referee who won the County Championship with Essex and played for England. Such went to school in East Leake.
- Chris Sutton (born 1973), football player, manager and commentator. Sutton made 409 appearances and scored 148 goals for clubs including Norwich City, Blackburn Rovers (with whom he won the 1994–95 Premier League) and Celtic, and was capped once by England. He lived in East Leake as a child.

== Gallery ==
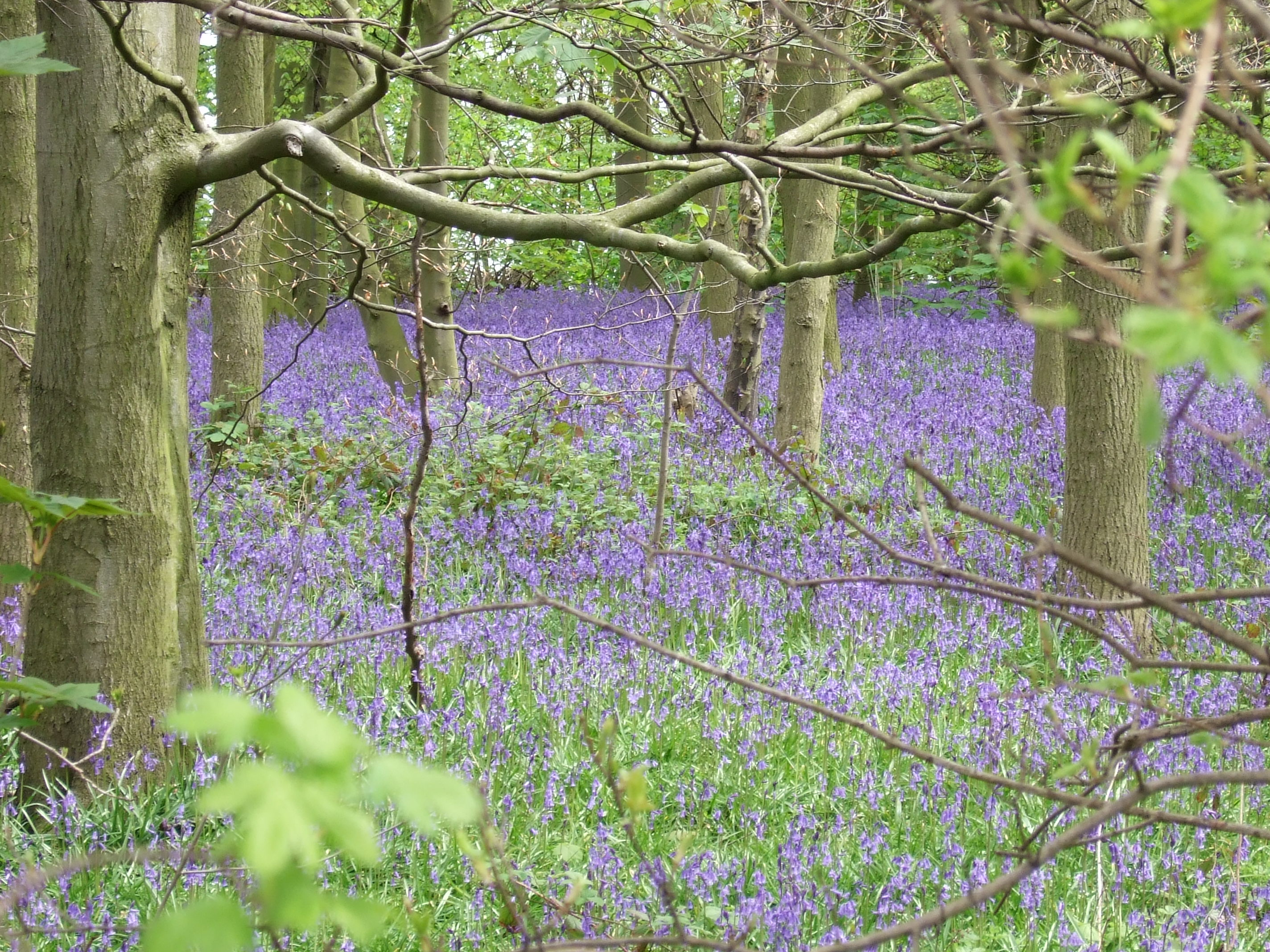
Bluebells in Colonel's Covert

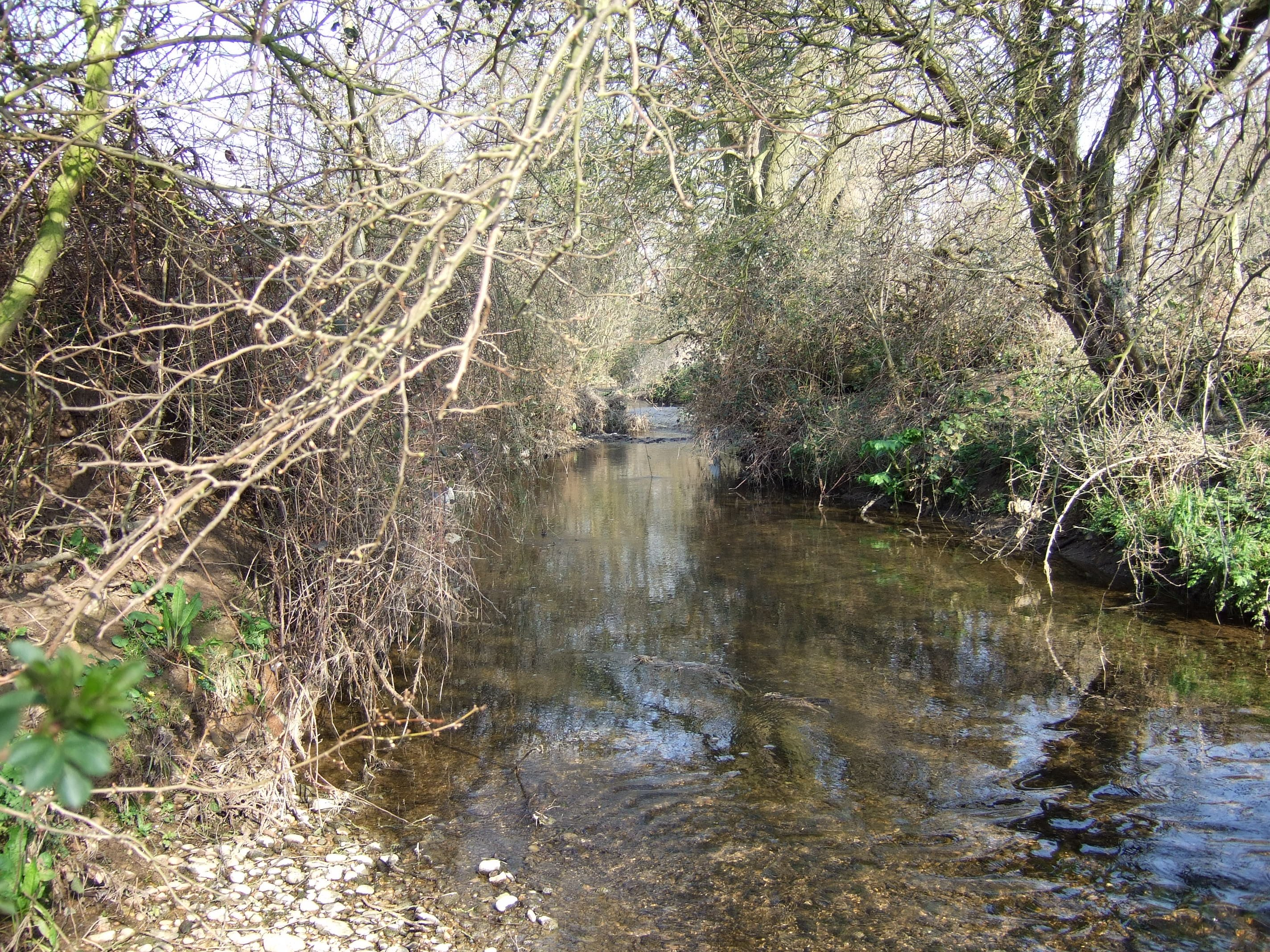
Kingston Brook at East Leake

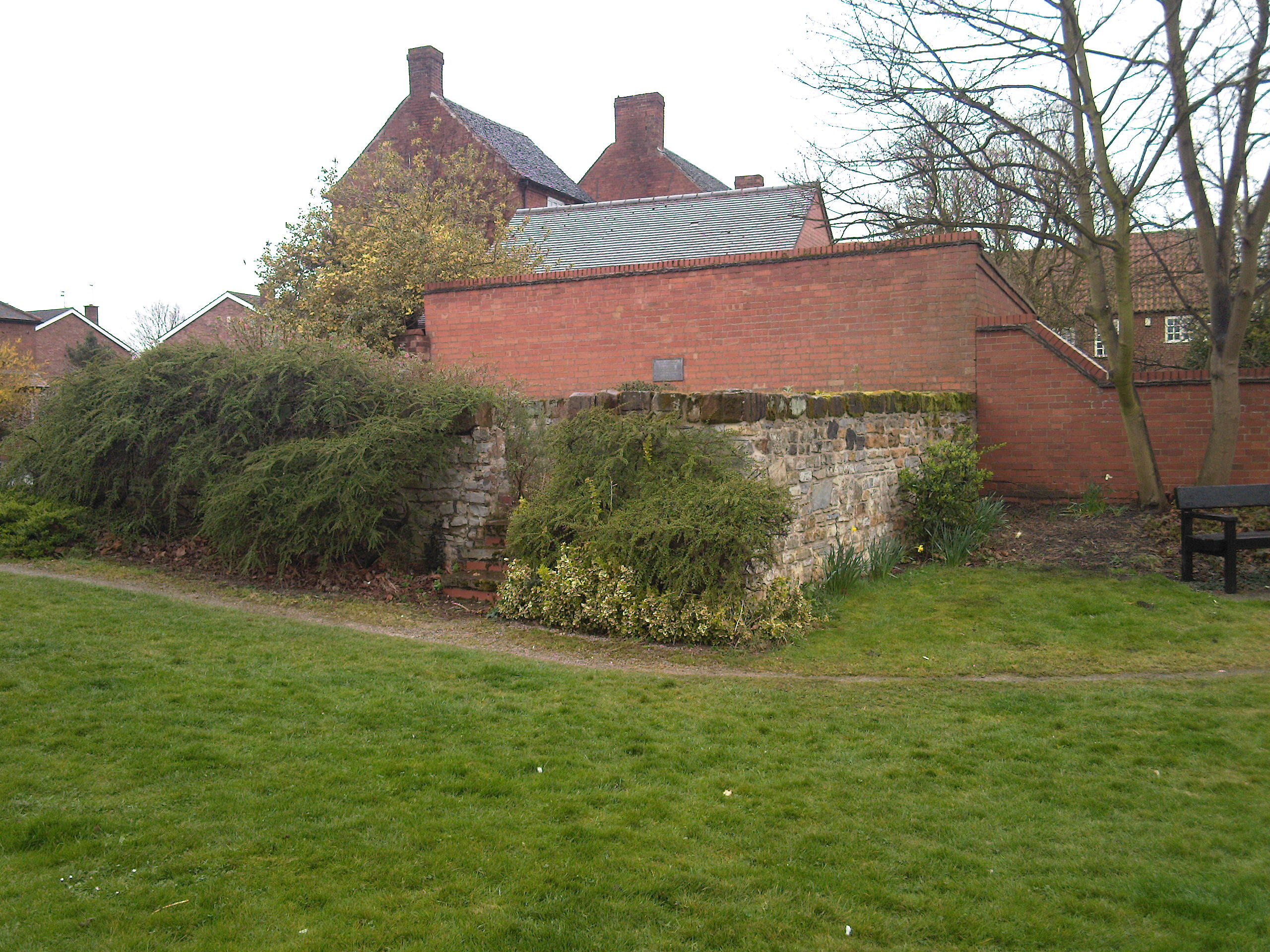
Pinfold

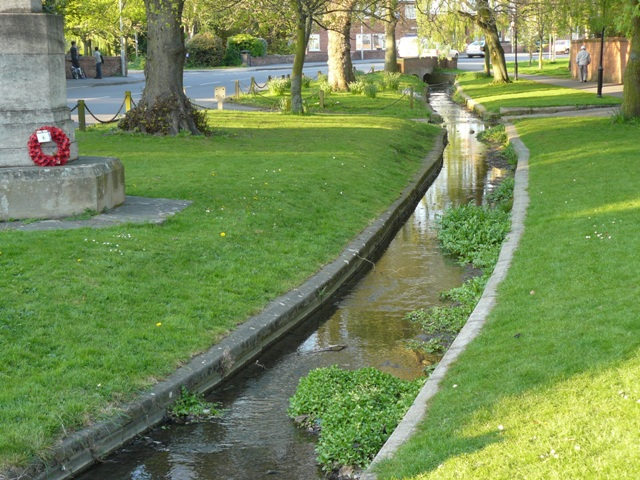
Sheepwash Brook

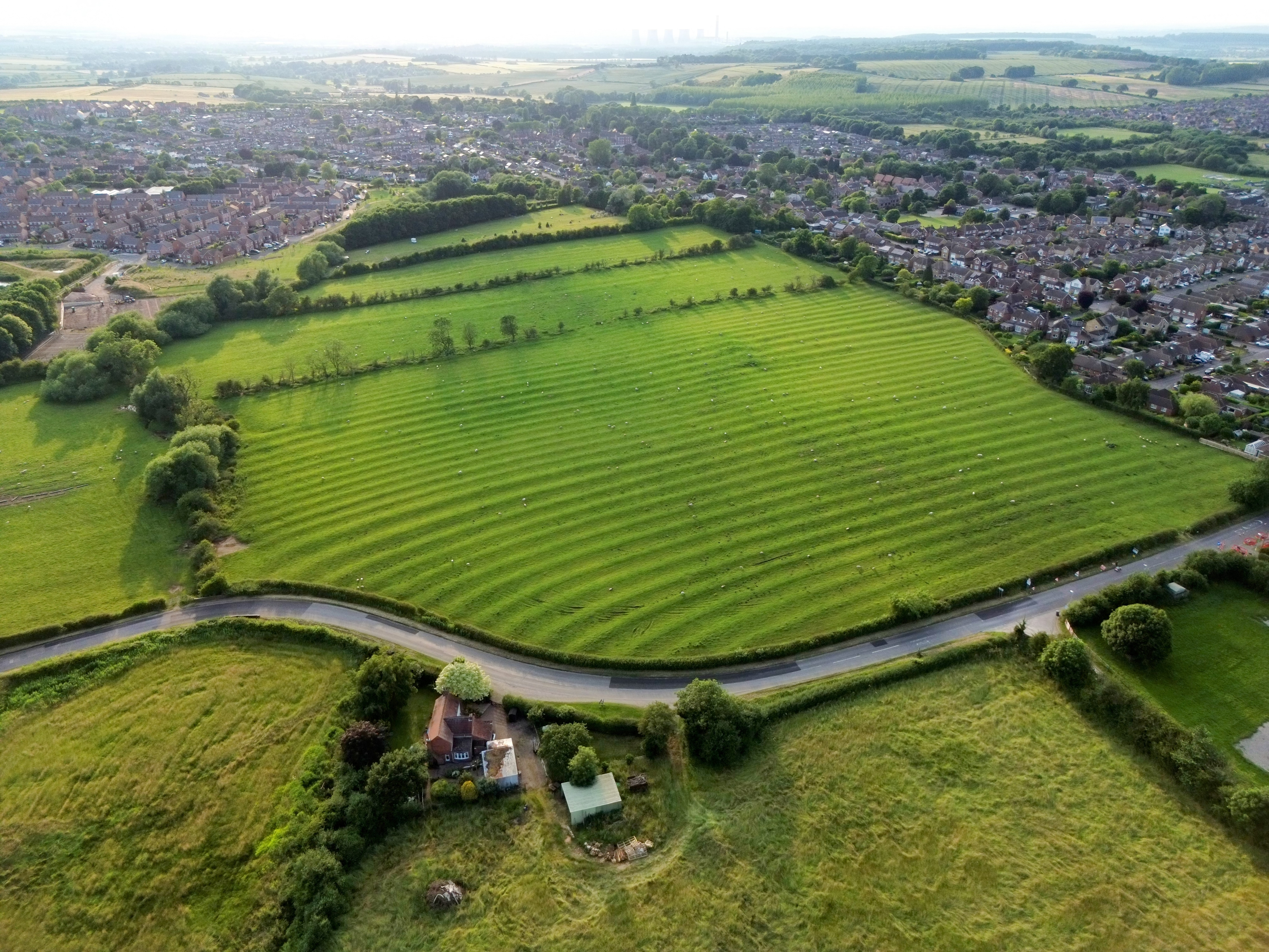
A ridge and furrow field to the west of Castle Hill road

== Neighbouring villages ==
- West Leake
- Costock
- Gotham
- Bunny
- Sutton Bonington
- Normanton on Soar
- Rempstone
- Stanford on Soar
- Zouch

== See also ==
- Listed buildings in East Leake

== Publications ==
- Sidney Pell Potter, A History of East Leake, published in 1903. Potter was the rector at the time.
