= Ernest Hayes =

Ernest Hayes may refer to:

- Ernie Hayes (1876–1953), English cricketer
- Ernest Hayes (British Army soldier) (1898–1938)
- Ernest Hayes (engineer) (1851–1933), New Zealand engineer and inventor
- Ernest Hayes (priest), Dean of Brechin
- Ernesto Hayes, Argentine footballer
