= William Upton =

William Upton may refer to:

- William W. Upton, American jurist and politician
- William Upton (cricketer), English cricketer
- Bill Upton, Major League Baseball pitcher
