= Listed buildings in Cotgrave =

Cotgrave is a civil parish in the Rushcliffe district of Nottinghamshire, England. The parish contains twelve listed buildings that are recorded in the National Heritage List for England. Of these, one is listed at Grade I, the highest of the three grades, and the others are at Grade II, the lowest grade. The parish contains the village of Cotgrave and the surrounding area. The listed buildings consist of houses and associated structures, farmhouses, a church and a chest tomb in the churchyard, a village cross, a lychgate and a war memorial.

== Key ==
Grade	Criteria
I	Buildings of exceptional interest, sometimes considered to be internationally important
II	Buildings of national importance and special interest

== Buildings ==
Name and location	Photograph	Date	Notes	Grade
All Saints' Church; 52.91171°N 1.04362°W		12th century	The church has been altered and extended through the centuries, and it was restored in 1877–78. It is built in stone with slate roofs, and consists of a nave with a clerestory, north and south aisles, a south porch, a chancel with a north organ chamber and vestry, and a west steeple. The steeple has a two-stage tower with a moulded plinth, bands, a three-light west window, a south doorway, a clock face on the east side, two-light bell openings, an embattled parapet, and a recessed spire.	I
Village cross 52.91189°N 1.04305°W		16th century	The cross is in a triangle of grass at a road junction. It is in stone, and a portion of the 16th-century shaft stands on a 20th-century stepped base.	II
1 Church Lane; 52.91154°N 1.04428°W		Mid 17th century	The house has a timber framed core, it is mostly encased in whitewashed brick, and has a pantile roof. There are two storeys and four bays. The house contains a doorway and a porch, and most of the windows are casements.	II
Whitelands Farmhouse and 2 Main Road; 52.91168°N 1.04149°W		18th century	A house was added to the left of the farmhouse in the 19th century, and they have since been combined. They are in red brick, each with two storeys. The farmhouse has dentilled eaves, a tile roof, and three bays, and it contains casement windows, those on the ground floor with segmental heads. The house is taller, with a slate roof, hipped on the left, and overhanging eves. There are three bays, in the centre is a trellis porch, and the windows are sashes with segmental heads.	II
Acacia House; 52.91217°N 1.03978°W		Late 18th century	The house is in whitewashed brick, with dentilled eaves, and a slate roof with brick coped gables and kneelers. There are two storeys and attics, three bays, and two-storey rear extensions. The central doorway has a fanlight, the windows are tripartite casements, and all the openings have segmental heads.	II
Primrose House; 52.90968°N 1.04284°W	—	c. 1800	The house is in red brick with dentilled eaves, and a tile roof with brick coped gables and kneelers. There are two storeys and attics, a double depth plan with the gabled end facing the road, and a front of three bays. The central doorway has a moulded surround and a gabled hood, and the windows are sashes with rusticated rendered lintels and keystones.	II
Chest tomb 52.91181°N 1.04355°W		Early 19th century	The chest tomb is in the churchyard of All Saints' Church. It is in stone and rectangular, with tapering fluted piers at the angles, and acanthus decorated capitals. On the longer sides are inscriptions and pilaster strips decorated with lozenges, and the tomb has a moulded shaped top.	II
Cotgrave Place Farmhouse; 52.92761°N 1.06195°W	—	Early 19th century	The farmhouse, later used for other purposes, is rendered, on a stone plinth, and has a hipped slate roof with overhanging eaves. There are two storeys and five bays. In the centre is an archway with an inner doorway, and the windows are sashes.	II
The Limes; 52.91189°N 1.04464°W		Early 19th century	The house is built in brick, with red stretchers and pink headers, and the roof is slated and has stone coped gables. There are three storeys and three bays. The central doorway has a tripartite fanlight, and the windows are sashes, those in the lower two floors with brick wedge lintels.	II
The Old Rectory and garage 52.91073°N 1.04596°W		Early 19th century	The rectory, later a private house, is rendered, on a plinth, and has a slate roof, hipped on the left, with overhanging eaves. There are two storeys and three bays. On the front is a round-arched doorway with a hood on brackets, and the windows are sashes. To the right, and slightly projecting, is a single-storey rendered garage with a pantile roof.	II
Lychgate and walls, Cotgrave Cemetery; 52.91107°N 1.04409°W		1899	The lychgate at the entrance to the cemetery has stone walls, a timber superstructure, and a hipped slate roof with sprocketed eaves, carved animal heads on the corners, and a decorative cross on the ridge. The flanking walls extend for about 1 metre (3 ft 3 in), with railings, and end in piers with moulded caps.	II
War memorial 52.91090°N 1.04410°W		1920	The war memorial in Cotgrave Cemetery is in stone. It has a base of three steps, on which is a square plinth, and a cross with an octagonal tapering shaft. On the front face of the shaft are a bronze shaft and a wreath. On the front face of the plinth are two bronze plaques with inscriptions and the names of those lost in the two World Wars.	II
