= Elinor Mordaunt =

English author and traveller (1872–1942)

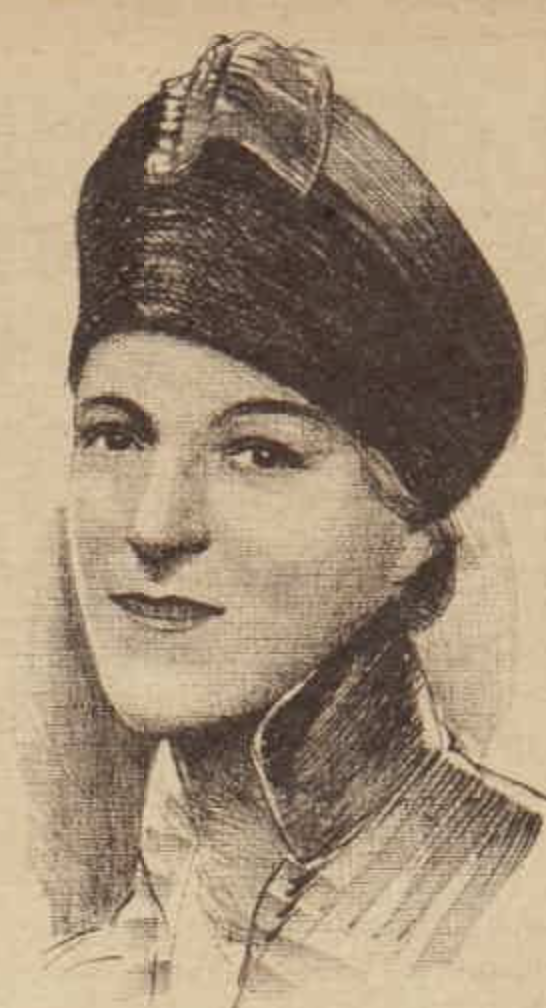
- Mordaunt in 1938
- Born: Evelyn May Clowes; 7 May 1872; Cotgrave, Nottinghamshire, England
- Died: 25 June 1942 (aged 70); Oxford, Oxfordshire, England
- Occupation: writer
- Spouses: Maurice Wilhemn Wiehe; Robert Rawnsley Bowles
- Children: 1
- Parent(s): St. John Legh Clowes; Elizabeth Caroline Bingham

Evelyn May Clowes, known by the pseudonym Elinor Mordaunt (7 May 1872 – 25 June 1942), was an English author, writer and traveller born in Nottinghamshire, England. Her travels included Mauritius and Australia; she undertook a wide variety of employment.

== Early life ==
Mordaunt was the fifth child of St. John Legh Clowes and the Honourable Elizabeth Caroline Bingham. She was born in the village of Cotgrave, Nottinghamshire, and christened as Evelyn May Clowes. Her maternal grandfather was the Irish nobleman Denis Arthur Bingham, 3rd Baron Clanmorris.

Growing up in genteel circumstances, her early childhood was spent at Charlton Down House near Cheltenham, Gloucestershire, and her teenage years near Heythrop in the Cotswolds. She was educated at home by governesses, excelling at German, Latin, Greek, shorthand writing, landscape painting, and fabric and wallpaper design.

== Australia ==
In 1897 she went to Mauritius, and in 1898 married Maurice Wilhemn Wiehe, who owned a sugar plantation. She gave birth to two stillborn children. She arrived on 10 June 1902 and lived at Melbourne for about eight years. Her son, Godfrey Weston Wiehe, was born 9 March 1903.

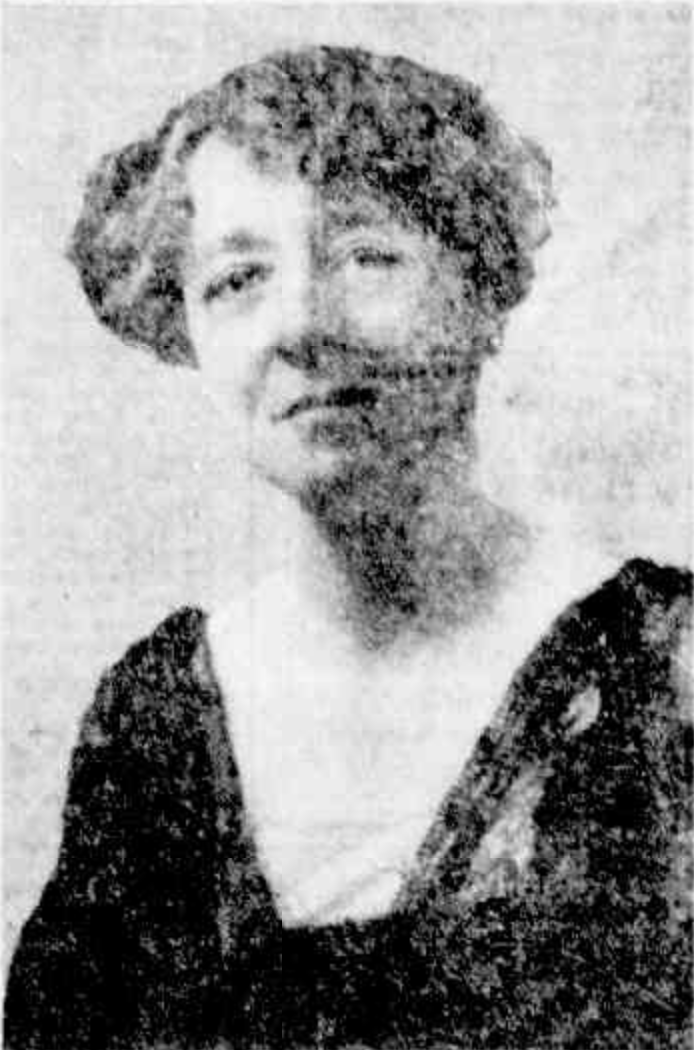
Mordaunt in 1924

== Second marriage ==
On 27 January 1933, she was married to Robert Rawnsley Bowles.

== Death ==
She died on 25 June 1942 at the Radcliffe Infirmary, Oxford.

== Literary reputation ==
Mordaunt was revealed as the author of a pseudonymous novel called Gin and Bitters (1931), referencing the debate in the London publishing world over whether Somerset Maugham had based the character of Alroy Kear in Cakes and Ale on Hugh Walpole. The book was removed from sale in the UK, apparently under pressure from Maugham.

=== Bibliography ===
==== As E. M. Clowes ====
Non-fiction

- On the Wallaby: Through Australia (1911)

==== As 'Eleanor Mordaunt' ====
- A Ship of Solace (1911)
- The Cost of It (1912)
- Lu of the Ranges (1913)
- The Garden of Contentment (1913)

==== As 'Elinor Mordaunt' ====
Non-fiction

- People, Houses and Ships (1924)
- The Further Venture Book (1926)
- Purely for Pleasure (1931)
- Sinabada (1937)
- Hobby Horse (1940)

Novels

- Simpson (1914)
- Bellamy (1914)
- The Rose of Youth (1915)
- The Family (1915)
- The Park Wall (1916)
- The Pendulum (1918)
- The Processionals (1918)
- The Little Soul (1920)
- Laura Creichton (1921)
- Alas, That Spring - ! (1922)
- Reputation (1923)
- The Dark Fire (1927)
- The Centre of the Cyclone. Serialised: Daily Mirror (1928)
- And Then? (1927)
- Father and Daughter (1928)
- These Generations (1930)
- Full Circle (1931)
- Cross Winds (1932)
- The Girl and the Colt. Serialised: Wicklow People (1932)
- Mrs Van Kleek (1933)
- Royals Free (1937)
- Three Generations (1937)
- Pity of the World (1938)
- Roses in December (1939)
- Judge Not (1940)
- Blitz Kids (1941)
- This Was Our Life (1942)
- To Sea, To Sea (1943)

Short story collections

- The Island (1914)
- Before Midnight (1917)
- Old Wine in New Bottles (1919)
- Short Shipments (1922)
- Shoe and Stocking Stories (1926)
- Traveller's Pack (1933)
- The Tales of Elinor Mordaunt (1934)
- Death It Is (1939)
- The Villa and The Vortex (2021)

==== As 'A. Riposte' ====
- Gin and Bitters (1931)

== Sources ==
- Serle, Percival (1949). "Mordaunt, Elinor". Dictionary of Australian Biography. Sydney: Angus & Robertson.
- Sally O'Neill, 'Mordaunt, Evelyn May (1872–1942)', Australian Dictionary of Biography, Volume 10, MUP, 1986, pp 582–583
