= All Saints' Church, Cotgrave =

All Saints’ Church, Cotgrave
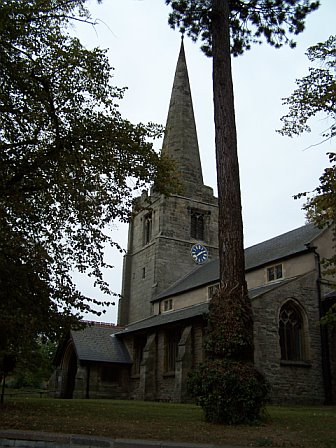
- All Saints’ Church, Cotgrave
- All Saints’ Church, Cotgrave
- 52°54′42″N 1°02′37″W
- OS grid reference: SK 64412 35344
- Location: Cotgrave
- Country: England
- Denomination: Church of England

Architecture
- Heritage designation: Grade I listed

Administration
- Diocese: Diocese of Southwell and Nottingham
- Archdeaconry: Nottingham
- Deanery: East Bingham
- Parish: Cotgrave

All Saints’ Church is a Grade I listed Church of England parish church in the Diocese of Southwell and Nottingham in Cotgrave.

== History ==
The church dates from the 12th century, and was restored between 1877 and 1878 by Evans and Jolley. An arson attack in 1996 caused considerable damage but the church was restored.

During an outbreak of the plague in 1637 the church was used as a food store for the village during the outbreak. Money for goods was disinfected as it was passed through a hollowed-out stone filled with vinegar to the men who had locked themselves away in the church. The stone is still in the church.

== Bells ==
The church enjoys a ring of eight bells, most made by John Taylor & Co. A team of ringers practise regularly (Fridays and Sundays).

== Clock ==
A new clock was installed in 1865 by Reuben Bosworth. It was built on the eight day principle and the works were enclosed in a cast-iron frame five feet long, three feet wide, and four and a half feet high. The wheels were of yellow brass, with hardened pinions, the largest wheels being 14 inchest in diameter. The pendulum was 10.5 feet (3.2 m) long and the large weights were 5 cwt each. It had quarterjack, and one dial 5 feet (1.5 m) in diameter. The chime and strike used bells from the peal of five in the tower. The cost of the clock was £135 and it was defrayed by public subscription.

The clock was restored by John Smith and Sons of Derby in 1977 when electrical driven chime and strike with auto wind was installed on the going train. In 2006 the clock was restored again and the clock dial was repainted and gilded in 2007.

== See also ==
- Grade I listed buildings in Nottinghamshire
- Listed buildings in Cotgrave
