= Cakes and Ale =

1930 novel by W. Somerset Maugham

Cakes and Ale, or, The Skeleton in the Cupboard
- Cover of the first UK edition
- Author: W. Somerset Maugham
- Language: English
- Genre: Satirical novel
- Publisher: William Heinemann Ltd. (UK); Garden City Publishing Company, Inc. (US)
- Publication date: 1930
- Publication place: United Kingdom
- Media type: Print (hardback)
- Pages: 308

Cakes and Ale, or, The Skeleton in the Cupboard (1930) is a novel by the British author W. Somerset Maugham. Maugham exposes the misguided social snobbery levelled at the character Rosie Driffield, whose frankness, honesty, and sexual freedom make her a target of conservative opprobrium. Her character is treated favourably by the book's narrator, Ashenden, who understands that she was a muse to the many artists who surrounded her, and who himself enjoyed her sexual favours.

Maugham drew his title from the remark of Sir Toby Belch to Malvolio in William Shakespeare's Twelfth Night: "Dost thou think, because thou art virtuous, there shall be no more cakes and ale?" Cakes and ale are also the emblems of the good life in Joseph Jacobs' 1912 rendition of Aesop's fable of "The Town Mouse and the Country Mouse": "Better beans and bacon in peace than cakes and ale in fear."

In his introduction to a Modern Library edition, published in 1950, Maugham wrote, "I am willing enough to agree with common opinion that Of Human Bondage is my best work ... But the book I like best is Cakes and Ale ... because in its pages lives for me again the woman with the lovely smile who was the model for Rosie Driffield."

== Plot summary ==
The story is a satire of London literary society during the Interwar period. The narrator, a well-to-do author named William Ashenden, is unexpectedly contacted by Alroy Kear, a moderately talented London writer who has been asked to write a biography of the famous, recently deceased novelist Edward Driffield by Amy, his second wife. Driffield, once scorned for his realist representation of late-Victorian working-class characters, had in his later years come to be lionised by scholars of English letters. Amy, a nurse to the ailing Edward after his first wife left him, is known for her propriety, and her interest in augmenting and cementing her husband's literary reputation. Her only identity is that of caretaker of her husband in life and of his reputation in death. It is well-known, however, that Driffield wrote his best novels while he was married to his first wife and muse, Rosie.

Knowing that Ashenden had an acquaintanceship with the Driffields as a young man, Kear presses him for inside information about Edward's past, including Rosie, who has been oddly erased from the official narrative of Edward's genius.

Ashenden recounts his experience as a teenager in Blackstable, a small town in Kent. He is befriended by Driffield, then an obscure writer, who is married to a former barmaid, Rosie. Both are well beneath Ashenden's social status, but he finds them interesting and visits them often. The relationship ends when the Driffields skip town, leaving a host of creditors unpaid.

Years later, as a medical student in London, Ashenden runs into Rosie on the street and renews the friendship. Driffield is beginning to make a name for himself, championed by Mrs. Barton Trafford, a socialite who promotes and manages promising talent. Ashenden and Rosie become lovers, but he suspects that she is having affairs with other male friends as well. This second period ends when Rosie runs off to America with "Lord George" Kemp, a former lover from the Blackstable years.

Driffield marries his nurse, Amy, who rearranges his life and moulds him into a famous and cherished author. Kear becomes close to them and after Driffield's death, is asked to write his biography. Amy and Kear both denigrate Rosie and see the only good thing about her is abandoning Driffield so his genius could flourish. They believe Rosie is dead, but Ashenden knows that she is alive and widowed in Yonkers, New York, where he once visited her. Ashenden decides that he will not share anything he knows about Rosie with Kear and Amy.

== Publishing history ==
Cakes and Ale was first published in serialised form in four issues of Harper's Bazaar (February, March, April, and June 1930). The first edition of the novel was published in September the same year by William Heinemann in London and the Garden City Publishing Company in Garden City, New York.

== Characters ==
- William Ashenden: Author-narrator.
- Amy Driffield: Nurse and second wife to Edward Driffield.
- Edward Driffield (Ted): Late-Victorian realist author.
- Rosie Driffield/Iggulden (née Gann): First wife of Edward Driffield, second wife of George Kemp.
- Miss Fellows: Ashenden's landlady.
- Mrs Hudson: Ashenden's first London landlady.
- Alroy Kear: Biographer of Edward Driffield, literary acquaintance of Ashenden.
- George Kemp/Iggulden (Lord George): Vivacious middle-class coal merchant and entrepreneur of Blackstable who runs off with Mrs Driffield to the United States and changes his name to Iggulden to protect himself from prosecution.
- Mrs Barton Trafford: Patron of the arts and generous supporter of Edward Driffield.
- The Vicar, Mr Ashenden: William's conservative uncle who initially forbids his nephew to fraternise with Ted and Rosie Driffield.
- Mary-Ann: Maid to the Ashendens in Blackstable, childhood acquaintance of Rosie Driffield, and caretaker of young Ashenden.

== Real-life counterparts ==
Two of the novel's principal characters, Alroy Kear and Edward Driffield, were widely interpreted by contemporaneous readers as thinly veiled and unflattering characterizations of, respectively, the novelists Hugh Walpole and Thomas Hardy (who had died two years previously). In response to a letter from Walpole inquiring about the association, Maugham denied it: "I certainly never intended Alroy Kear to be a portrait of you. He is made up of a dozen people and the greater part of him is myself". In an introduction written for the 1950 Modern Library edition of the book, however, Maugham admitted that Walpole was indeed the inspiration for Kear, but denied that Hardy inspired the Driffield character.

In 1931, a pseudonymous novel called Gin and Bitters by A. Riposte was published in the United States and told the story of "a novelist who writes novels about other novelists", and furthered the speculation about the Walpole/Kear association. It was rumoured that the author was Hugh Walpole himself, after the novel appeared in England under the title Full Circle. The book was quickly removed from sale by its English publisher, supposedly at the behest of Somerset Maugham. The true author was later discovered to be Elinor Mordaunt.

In The Fine Art of Literary Mayhem, Myrick Land asserts that Cakes and Ale ruined the last 11 years of Walpole's life and destroyed his reputation as a writer.

Biographers have speculated that the Rosie Driffield character was inspired by Ethelwyn Sylvia (Jones) McDonnell (1883 – 1948), daughter of playwright Henry Arthur Jones, with whom Maugham had an eight-year-long affair culminating in her rejection of his marriage proposal. "The great love of Maugham's life was undoubtedly the warm, gentle, maternal, sexy Sue Jones." However, in his Modern Library introduction, Maugham said, "the model for what I consider the most engaging heroine I have ever created could never have recognized herself in my novel, since by the time I wrote it [in 1929] she was dead."

== Adaptations ==
In 1974, the BBC released a three episode mini-series Cakes and Ale, starring Michael Hordern and Judy Cornwell. It was rebroadcast on Masterpiece Theatre in the US.
