= Frank Robinson (Xylophone Man) =

English street entertainer (1932–2004)

Frank Robinson (1932 – 4 July 2004) was an eccentric street entertainer in Nottingham, England. He was by far Nottingham's best known busker and was regularly seen around Nottingham City Centre for over fifteen years. His favourite busking place was outside of the C&A store in the Lister Gate area of the city.

Little is known about Robinson's personal life or background. Robinson lived in Cotgrave, south of Nottingham, travelling to the city each day. His real name only became widely known following his death; to the people of Nottingham and beyond, he was simply and affectionately known as the 'Xylophone Man'.

Robinson played a small child's metallophone (despite his nickname) with a limited repertoire. His seemingly random hitting of bars was a familiar noise in the city centre and, despite his lack of musical ability, his excitable and enthusiastic approach to his instrument endeared him to the Nottingham public and also earned him something of a cult following.

The only interview he granted in his lifetime was with Nottingham media organisation LeftLion. His death in July 2004 sparked genuine mourning from many of the city's people. BBC Radio Nottingham placed a tributes page on its website which within hours had hundreds of messages from city's residents as well as people much further afield.

On 10 November 2005, a simple memorial was unveiled outside of the store where he had been seen regularly for the past fifteen years. Paying tribute to the Xylophone Man, the plaque reads "He played his Xylophone here for fifteen years, bringing a smile to the faces of the people of Nottingham".
