= Cotgrave =

Town and civil parish in Nottinghamshire, England

Coordinates: 52.914°N 1.042°W

- Town and civil parish
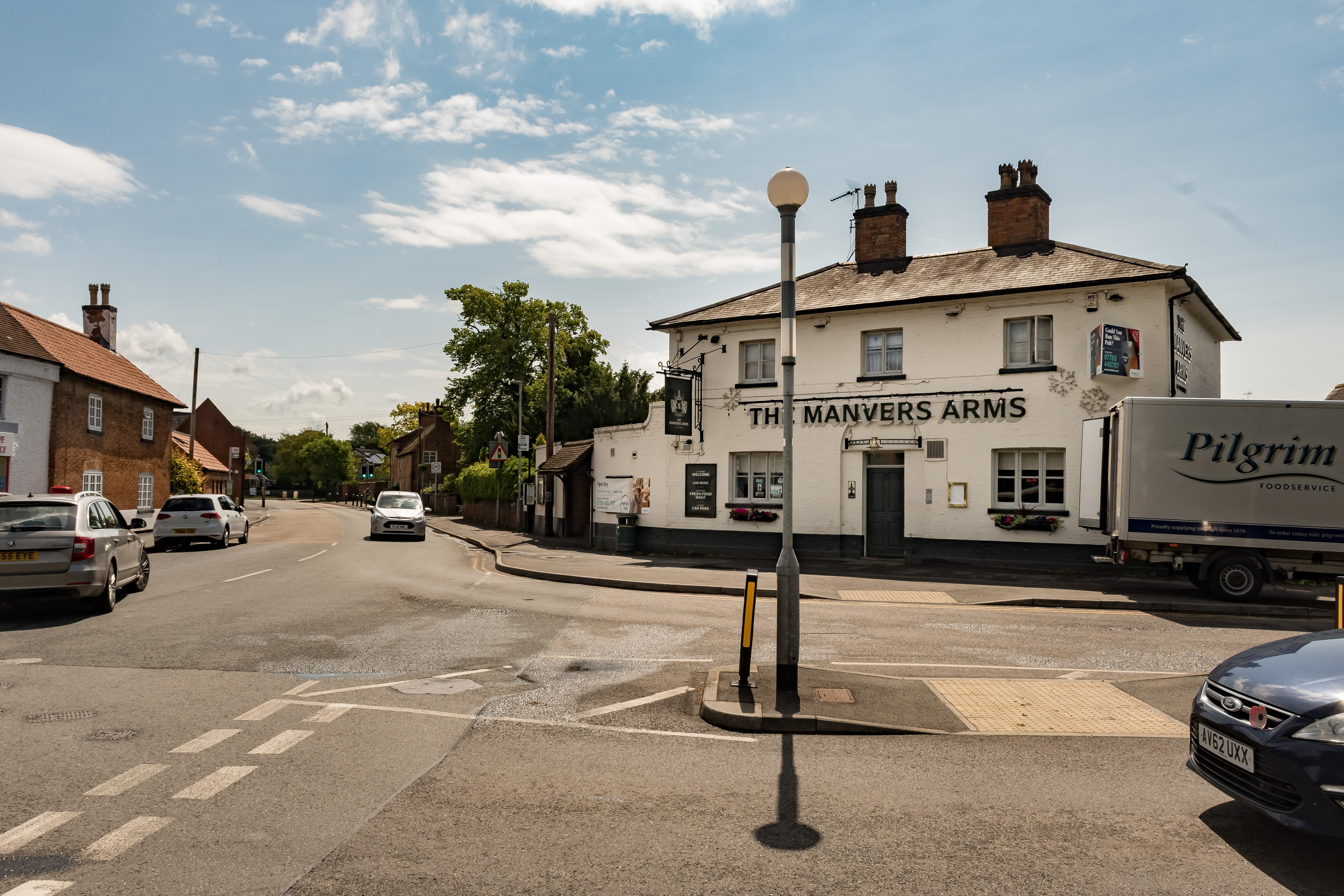
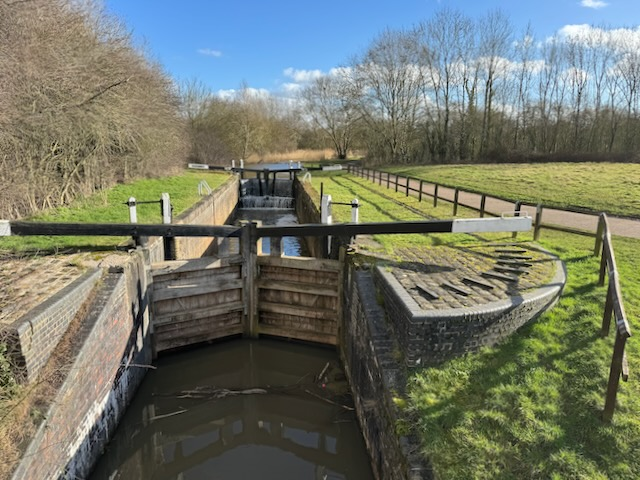
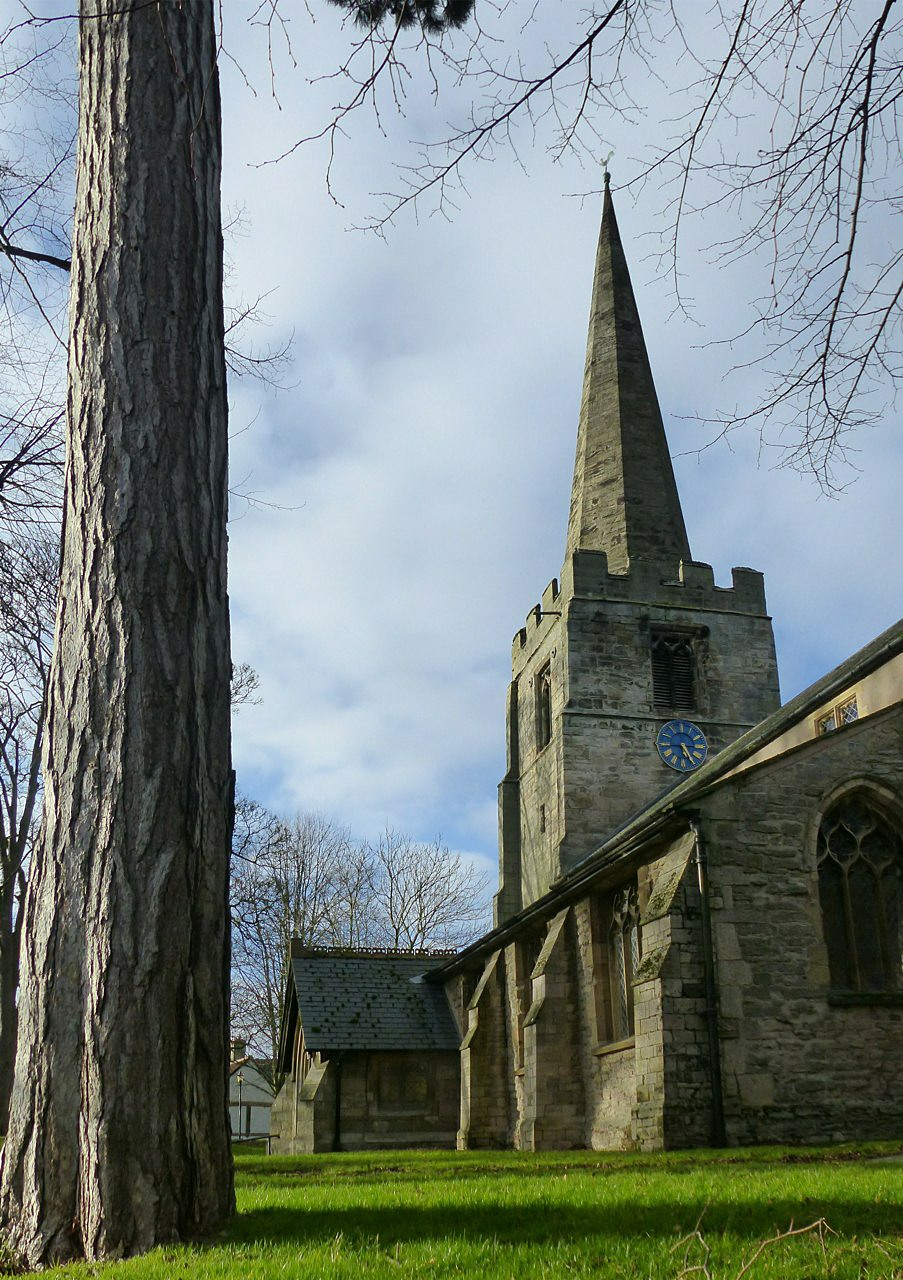
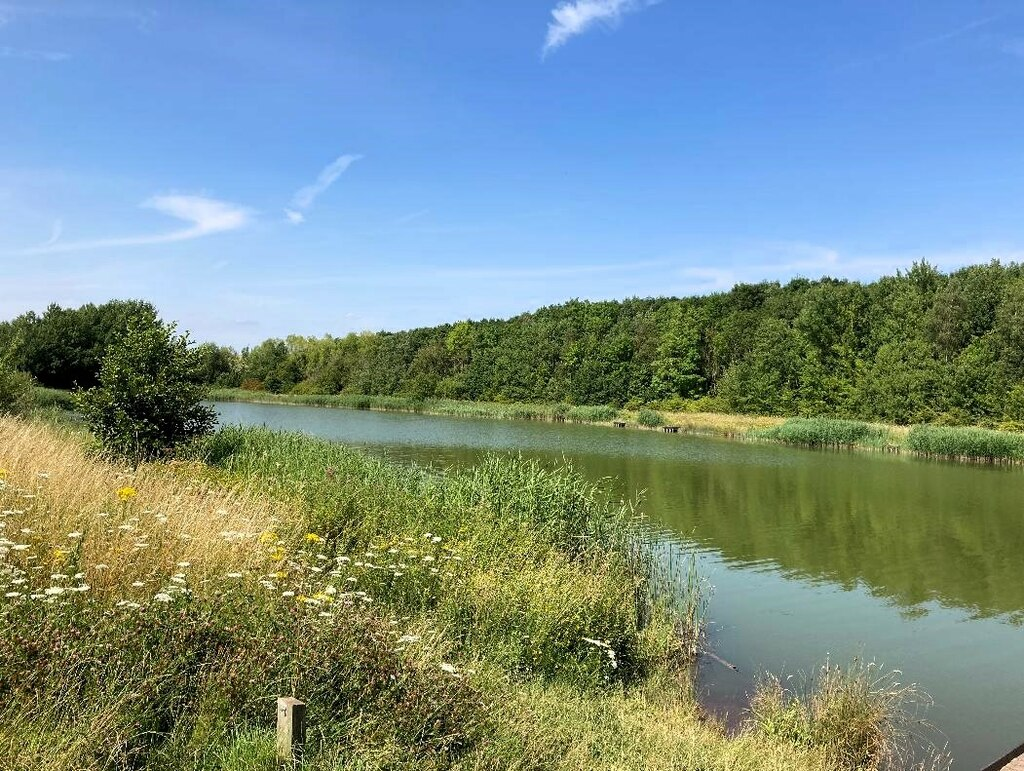
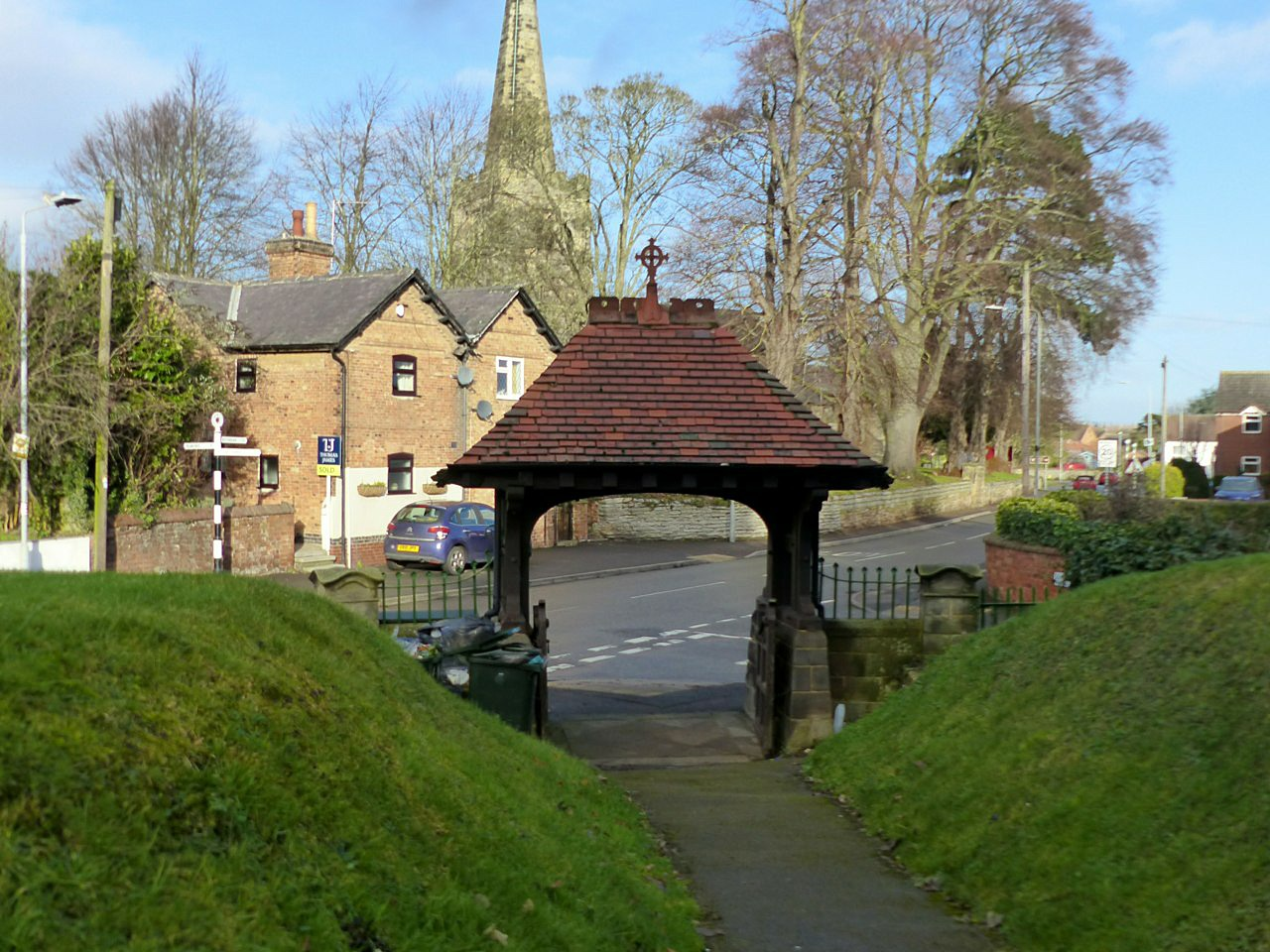
- The Manvers Arms Grantham Canal All Saints Country Park Lych Gate

- Location within Nottinghamshire
- Interactive map of Cotgrave
- Area: 5.96 sq mi (15.4 km^{2})
- Population: 8,206 (2021)
  - Density: 1,377/sq mi (532/km^{2})
- OS grid reference: SK 64412 35640
  - London: 105 mi (169 km) SSE
- District: Rushcliffe
- Shire county: Nottinghamshire
- Region: East Midlands
- Country: England
- Sovereign state: United Kingdom
- Post town: NOTTINGHAM
- Postcode district: NG12
- Dialling code: 0115
- Police: Nottinghamshire
- Fire: Nottinghamshire
- Ambulance: East Midlands
- UK Parliament: Rushcliffe
- Website: www.cotgrave-tc.gov.uk

Cotgrave (/ˈkɒtɡreɪv/) is a town and civil parish in the borough of Rushcliffe in Nottinghamshire, England. It is 5 miles (8 km) south-east of Nottingham. It perches on the South Nottinghamshire Wolds about 131 feet (40 metres) above sea level. The population of the parish in the 2001 census was 7,373 which then decreased to 7,203 at the 2011 census, though Owthorpe was included. It was estimated at 8,113 in 2019. Statistics from the 2021 census show the population had risen to 8,206.

== History ==
Cotgrave's origins may be in the Iron Age. A 6th-century Anglo-Saxon burial ground has been excavated at Mill Hill to the north of the old village. There was certainly a Saxon church a century before the Norman Conquest. The Roman Fosse Way passes a mile to the east, where it changes direction slightly. The A46 follows its course, and during improvements in 2012–13, excavations uncovered Ice Age flint tools. Evidence of an Iron Age settlement was also found at Owthorpe Junction, just to the east, and a 4,000-year-old Neolithic circular monument with eight Bronze Age burials emerged slightly further north at Stragglethorpe junction.

The place-name Cotgrave seems to contain an Old English personal name, Cotta, + grāf (Old English), grove or copse, to make 'Cotta's grove'.

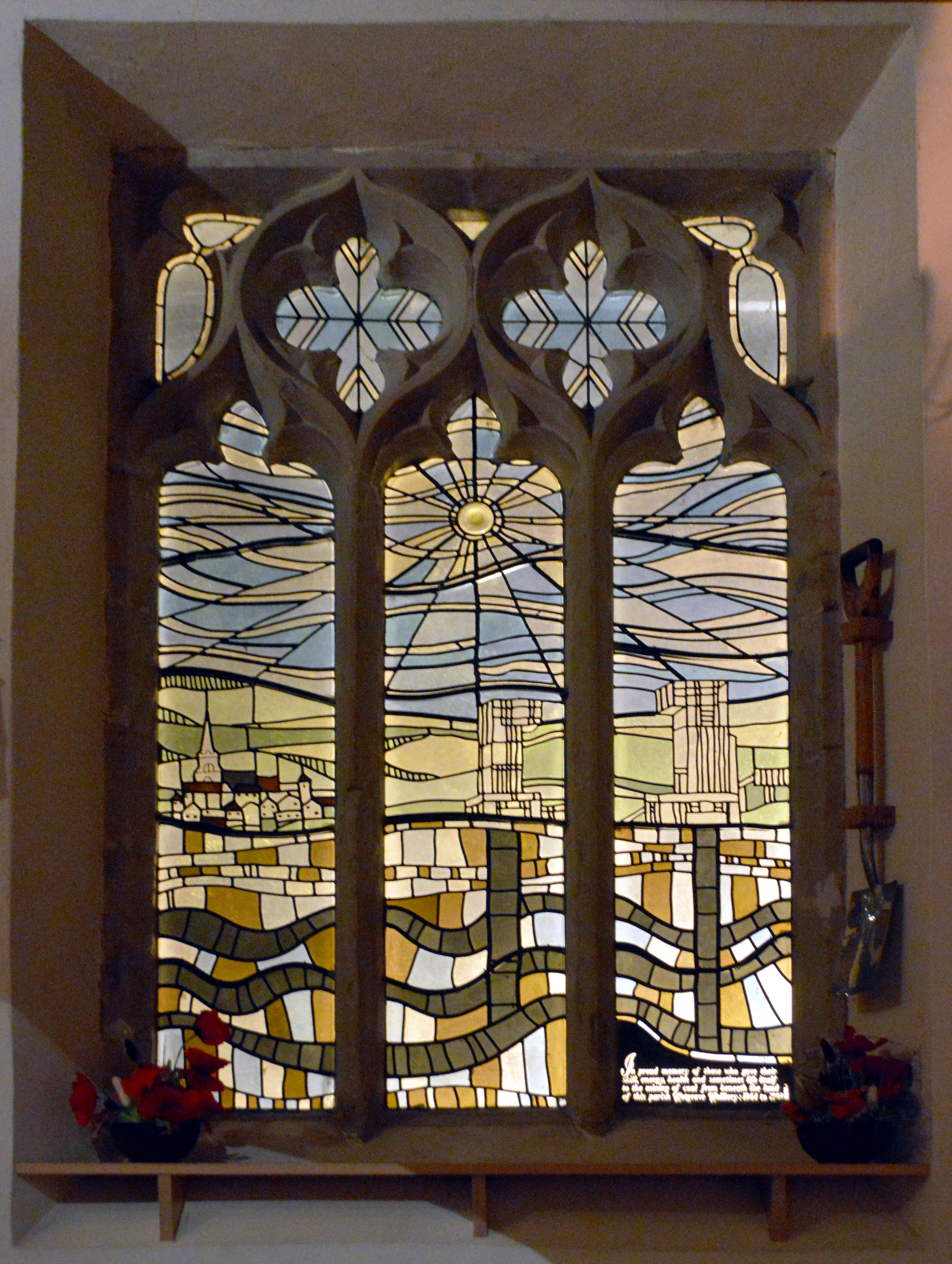
Colliery memorial window

The present substantial church, All Saints', dates from the 12th century, with several subsequent alterations and additions. An arson attack in 1996 caused considerable damage, but the church has since been restored at great expense. The church has a ring of eight bells, most made by Taylor's. A team of ringers practises regularly on Fridays and Sundays.

An outbreak of plague in 1637 killed 93 of a population of 500, including 46 children. All Saints' was used as a food store for the village during the outbreak. Money to pay for goods was disinfected as it was passed through a hollowed stone filled with vinegar to the men who had locked themselves away in the church. This stone is still in the church. On Scrimshire Lane, near the church, can be found an old wall, dubbed the "Thousand-Year Wall". It is riddled with small holes made by, and providing a home for a large group of solitary bees. Nearby, through a lych gate, is a graveyard that is separated from the church by a road. There can be found there a pillar on three tiers commemorating those of the village lost in service during the world wars. The church has a stained-glass window by J. F. Gascoyne & Son of Nottingham, dedicated in 1920 as a war memorial. There is also a window on the north aisle, east of the north door, depicting the koepe towers and underground workings of Cotgrave Colliery, which was sunk in the 1960s and abandoned in the 1980s. The window was installed after the fire at the church in 1996.

=== Memorials ===
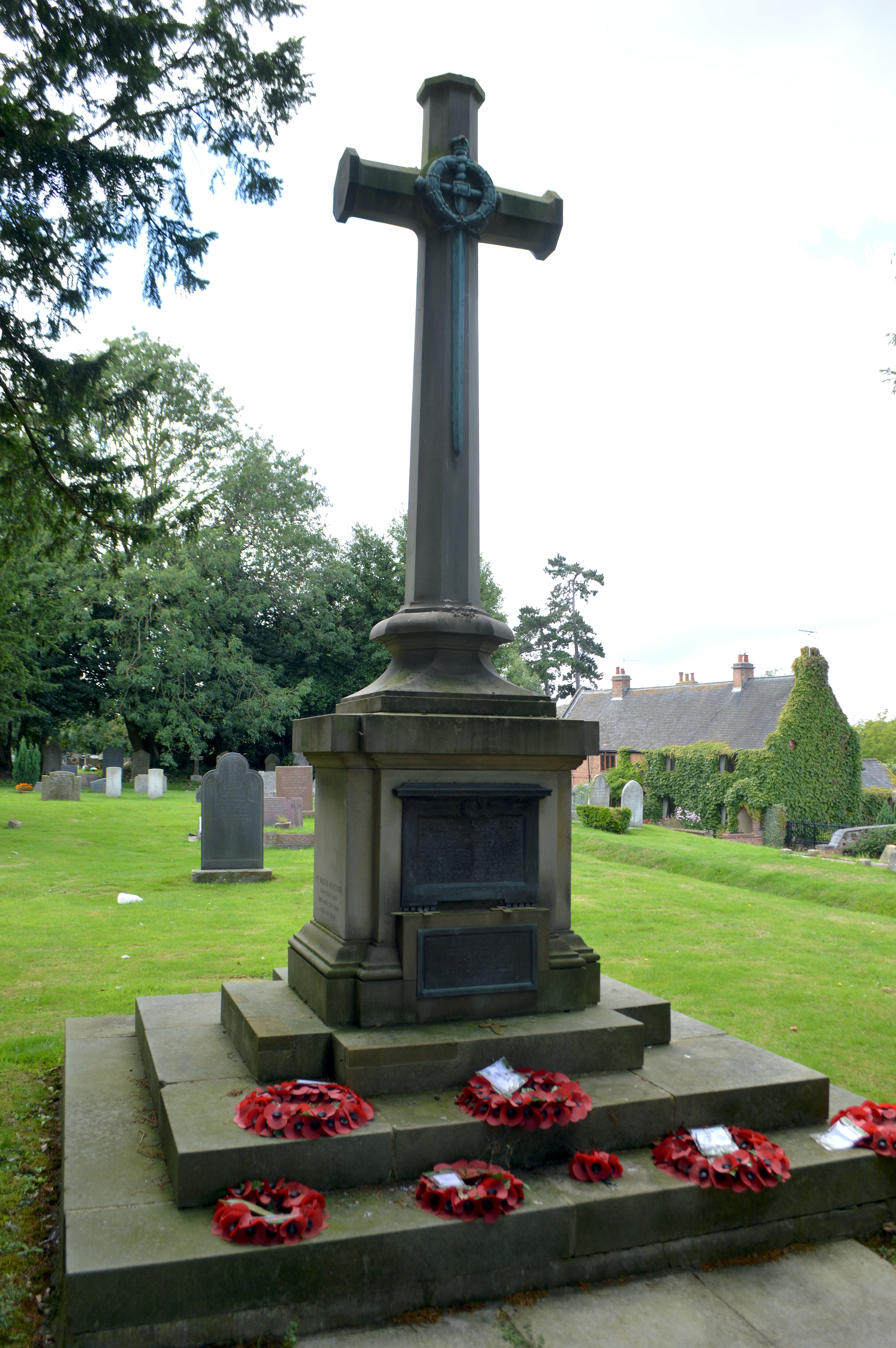
The memorial to the dead of both world wars

Cotgrave has a war memorial sited in the graveyard at Scrimshaw Lane to the west of All Saints. It commemorates the fallen of both world wars. The War Memorials Trust has helped with the upkeep of this.

Twelve men from the First World War are listed above four from the Second World War on two metal panels on the east face of the memorial. The south face (presumably added at a later date as there was no room on the east face), names Walter Henstock, died 1920. An active British Legion group that includes nearby villages marked the four-year centenary of the Great War by researching the men from the villages who gave their lives. Details of the Colston Bassett, Owthorpe and Cotgrave Great War Project, as far as they can be traced so far, appear on its website.

The surnames of those noted lost in the First World War are Lacey, Hind, Middleton, Herapath, Simpson, Henson, Hayes, Harrison, Marshall, Moulds, Carrington, Woolley, Henstock. Those from the Second World War; Cole, Pryor, Pepper, Phillips. The epitaph reads: "Be thou faithful unto death and I will give you a crown of life."

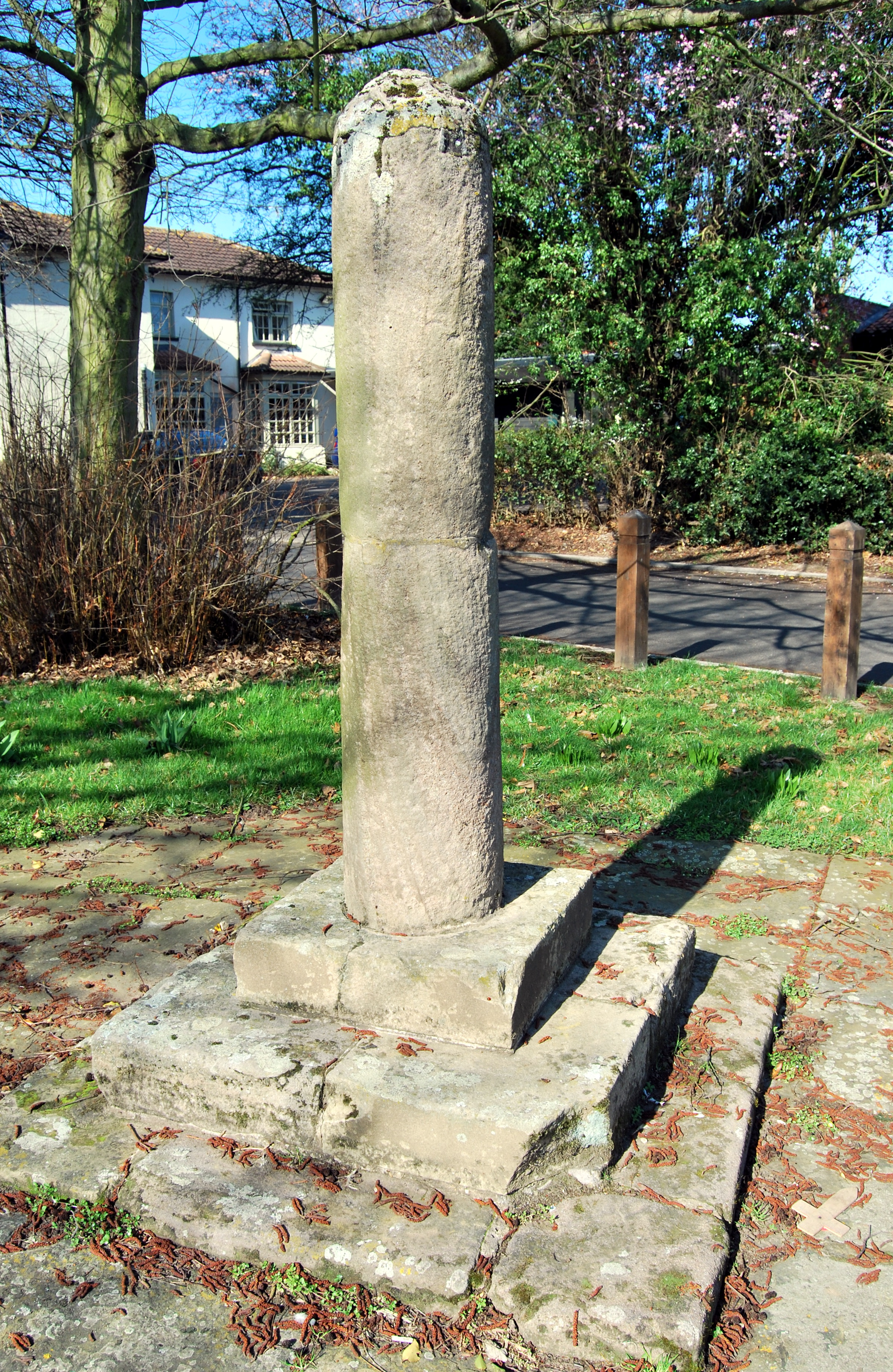
Cotgrave Cross

The epitaph is often referred to as the Cotgrave Cross, as is a six-foot-high monument at the east end of the church. With later, partly ashlar construction parts from the 20th century and parts from the 16th, it is somewhat of a mystery, as it is thought of as ancient, yet does not appear on photographs or pictures before the early 20th century. The site is near an important old junction, but there is no surviving medieval stonework evident. There were ideas of moving the war memorial to that site and the Cross moved perhaps to the country park, but these were dismissed as too costly.

There is a further memorial plaque, carved in oak, displayed to the right of the north door in All Saints' and a commemorative stained glass window to the east of the south aisle.

To the north at Cotgrave Place near the golf course is a memorial to a Vickers Wellington bomber that crashed on 8 February 1941. The aircraft from No. 12 Squadron, recently dispersed from RAF Station Binbrook to nearby RAF Station Tollerton, was on a gunnery training flight when the pilot met control problems. The aircraft hit an oak tree just short of the still extant runway, next to where the golf club house stands. A plaque nearby recalls seven of the crew who were killed.

=== Notable people ===
In birth order:

- William Upton (1804–1867), county cricketer for Nottinghamshire in 1827–28, was born and died in Cotgrave.
- Elinor Mordaunt (1872–1942), writer and traveller, was born in Cotgrave.
- Ernest Hayes (1898–1938), born in Gripps Cottage, Cotgrave, joined the Kings Own Yorkshire Light Infantry in 1916 and received the Military Medal three times for bravery on the Western Front (France) in 1918.
- Frank Robinson (1932 – 4 July 2004) of Cotgrave travelled to Nottingham daily to play a child's five-note glockenspiel round Lister Gate. On his death he received hundreds of tributes from listeners.
- Nathan Robertson (born 1977), Badminton player, was World Badminton Champion (2006 IBF World Championships – mixed doubles), Olympic Silver Medallist (2004), and Commonwealth Games 2010 mixed doubles silver medallist. He grew up in Cotgrave and attended the village school.

== Cotgrave Colliery ==
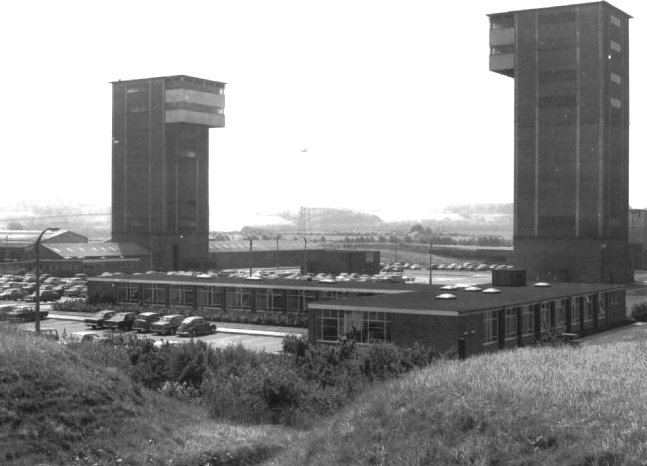
Cotgrave Colliery (courtesy AM500)

The town lies on the Grantham Canal, opened in 1797. Some exploration for coal had been attempted for a hundred years but none was discovered in the area until about 1950. Cotgrave Colliery was established in the early 1960s with large numbers of miners and their families being moved from other mining areas of England, especially the North East, to live on a large purpose-built housing estate. Initially, in 1962, around 500 experienced mining workers and their families, accepted the National Coal Board incentive of tied new houses complete with furnishings to move from the area of the recently closed Radford Mine on the north-west side of nearby Nottingham. This mine was near the site of what is now known as Bobber's Mill. Some four years later a similar scheme was introduced to attract miners from other worked-out mines in the North East of England, including Gateshead. According to residents, special meetings were arranged so that workers already established could understand, for safety reasons, the dialect, and vice versa, of the newcomers. The population of the village rose from about 700 to over 5,000 within a few years. In 1960, a 2.75 mi (4.43 km) branch railway was extended from the Nottingham–Grantham line across the River Trent past Radcliffe on Trent to the colliery. The line closed when the pit closed in 1993. The koepe towers at the pit head were considered very modern and distinctive compared with other pit-head winding-gear towers. In a departure from traditional miners' working conditions, face workers had extensive modern changing and shower facilities, which meant they could leave as clean as they entered.

The local economy was devastated by the mine's closure in 1993–94, which caused much bitterness. Like most Nottinghamshire mines, Cotgrave had continued working through the National Union of Mineworkers-declared 1984–85 miners' strike. Many took the view that this allegiance to the then Conservative government was betrayed. On its closure, it was reported that the seams had millions of tons of coal reserves but these were of insufficient quality. Local residents, however, recount that the mine was shut because of geological faults, the encounter of a subterranean stream and subsequent flood problems, and the growing remoteness of the seam face from the shaft, which drastically increased the cost of bringing the coal to the surface. The shafts were filled with concrete on closure and all associated buildings demolished.

The local economy has improved considerably as Cotgrave is surrounded by an affluent area with low unemployment. Many of the mineworkers who hailed from the North East stayed in Cotgrave, built homes and raised families.

== Amenities ==
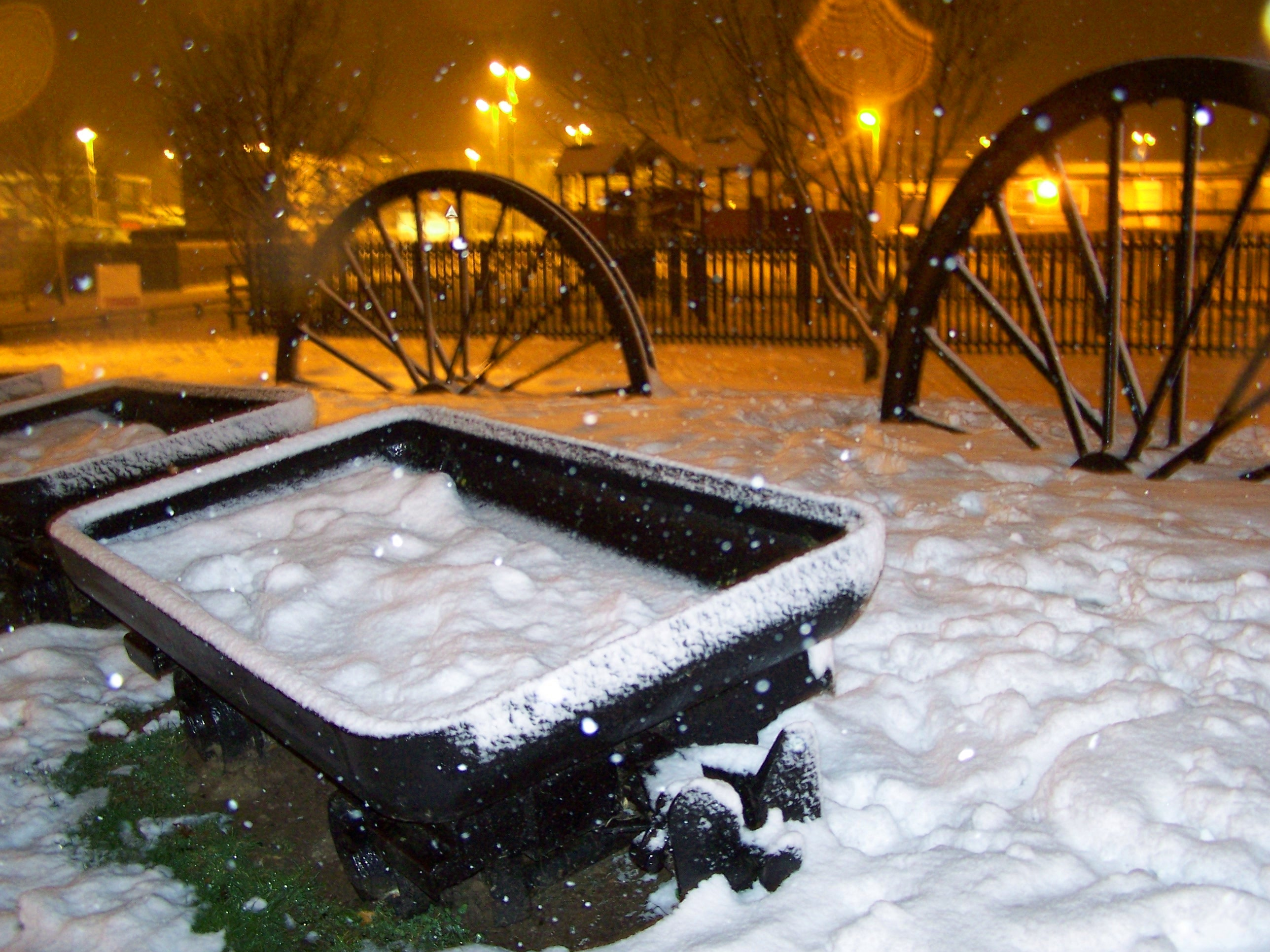
Tableaux of Cotgrave's mining heritage

There is a shopping parade called the Precinct, built at the same time as the large housing estates were developed, with a Co-op, a library, fish and chip shop, Chinese and kebab take-aways, other retailers, and a medical centre. This was regenerated in 2017–2020, with the demolition of several old buildings, the erection of new facades on some shops, and construction of a multi-service centre that now holds the library, medical practice, pharmacy and police station, as well as office space. A new children's play area, an expanded car parking area and new landscaping were also added.

The Church of England church is All Saints, on Plumtree Road. There is also has a Methodist chapel, dating from 1802 and a Roman Catholic church, (Our Lady of Grace). The Cross is a booklet produced monthly by the Anglican church.

Near the parish church is a small Sainsbury's Local store, and adjacent to that, The Pig and Pudding café. The leisure centre has a large swimming pool, gymnasium and sports hall with playing fields. There are two allotment areas, off Burrhill and Forest Close, and Cotgrave Community Gardens, a community led project that is run by volunteers to grow fruit and vegetables.

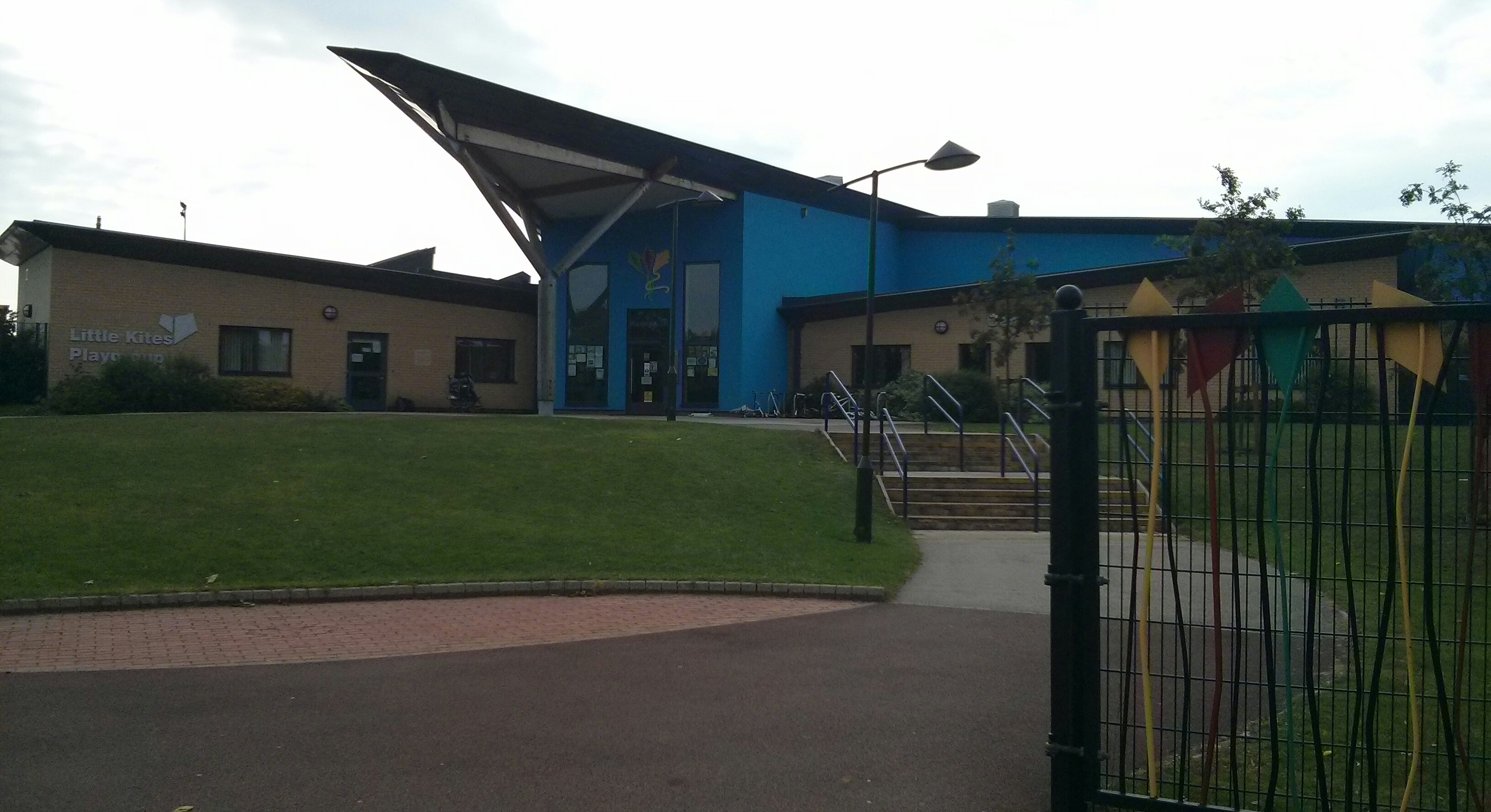
Cotgrave Candleby Lane School

There are two primary schools: Cotgrave Candleby Lane School and Cotgrave Church of England (Aided) Primary School. The latter first opened in 1720, and moved to the present building, built by Earl Manvers, in 1863. Another school, Ash Lea School, is a day, community Special School for pupils between the ages of three and nineteen who experience complex learning difficulties.

Nearby is Cotgrave Futures, with Sure Start and meeting facilities. There are two pubs: the Manvers Arms, named after the Manvers family, which owned much of the land in the area, and the Rose and Crown towards the north of the village. A third pub, the Black Diamond, was built in the early 1980s but closed in 2006, demolished and replaced with housing, known as Diamond Cottages.

== Media ==
In terms of television, the town is served by BBC East Midlands Today and ITV News Central (East).

Local radio stations are BBC Radio Nottingham, Capital Midlands, Smooth East Midlands, and The Eye, a community based station which broadcast from Melton Mowbray

== Community ==
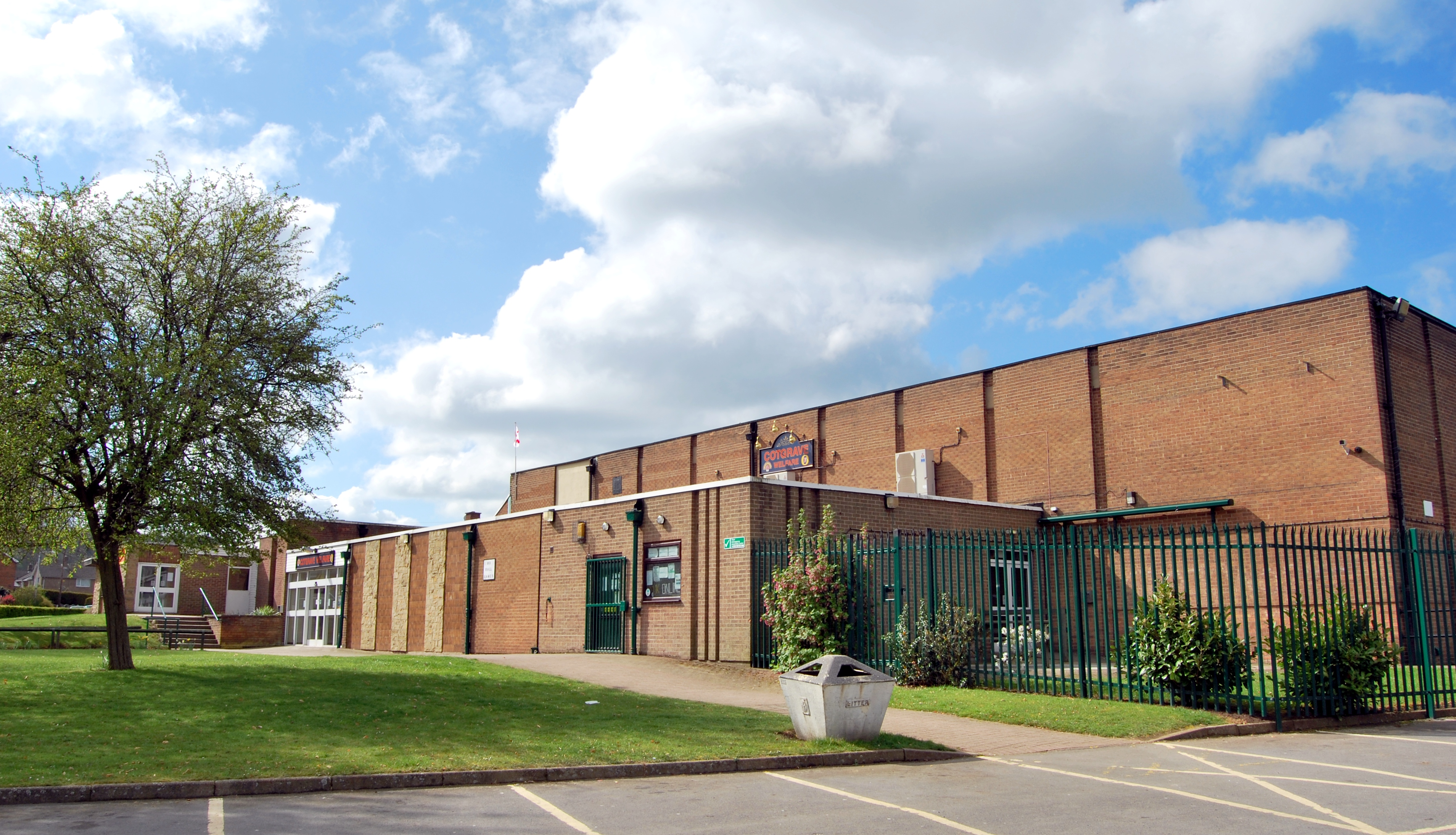
Cotgrave Club

Across the road from the leisure centre is Cotgrave Club. The Miners' Welfare Club was built in the early 1960s. An unremarkable building at first sight but of prodigious size, it boasts several bars, a garden, family and snooker rooms, entertainment suites with their own bars, and one of the largest fully equipped stages in the region. The main hall can seat several hundred and has two dedicated bars, a food bar and a gallery. The various rooms and hall are available for hire.

The club has a cricket and football team with grounds enough to field two football matches. There are changing rooms and pavilion facilities for home and visiting teams. The village also has an angling club. In 2012 the club hosted the Cotgrave Festival of Sports, a variety of sporting events through the last week in June, culminating in a finale day of presentations and entertainment. Involving all the schools and community, this was repeated in 2013–14 and is intended to continue annually.

There is also a Kickboxing club based at Cotgrave Leisure Centre which is through KickboxUK (Professional Kickboxing Association – Cotgrave).

At the end of 2011 the people of Cotgrave launched Cotgrave Community Website. This forum is paid for by the council but run by the council and local residents. Members are registered with their real names and checked on the electoral roll.

== Country park ==
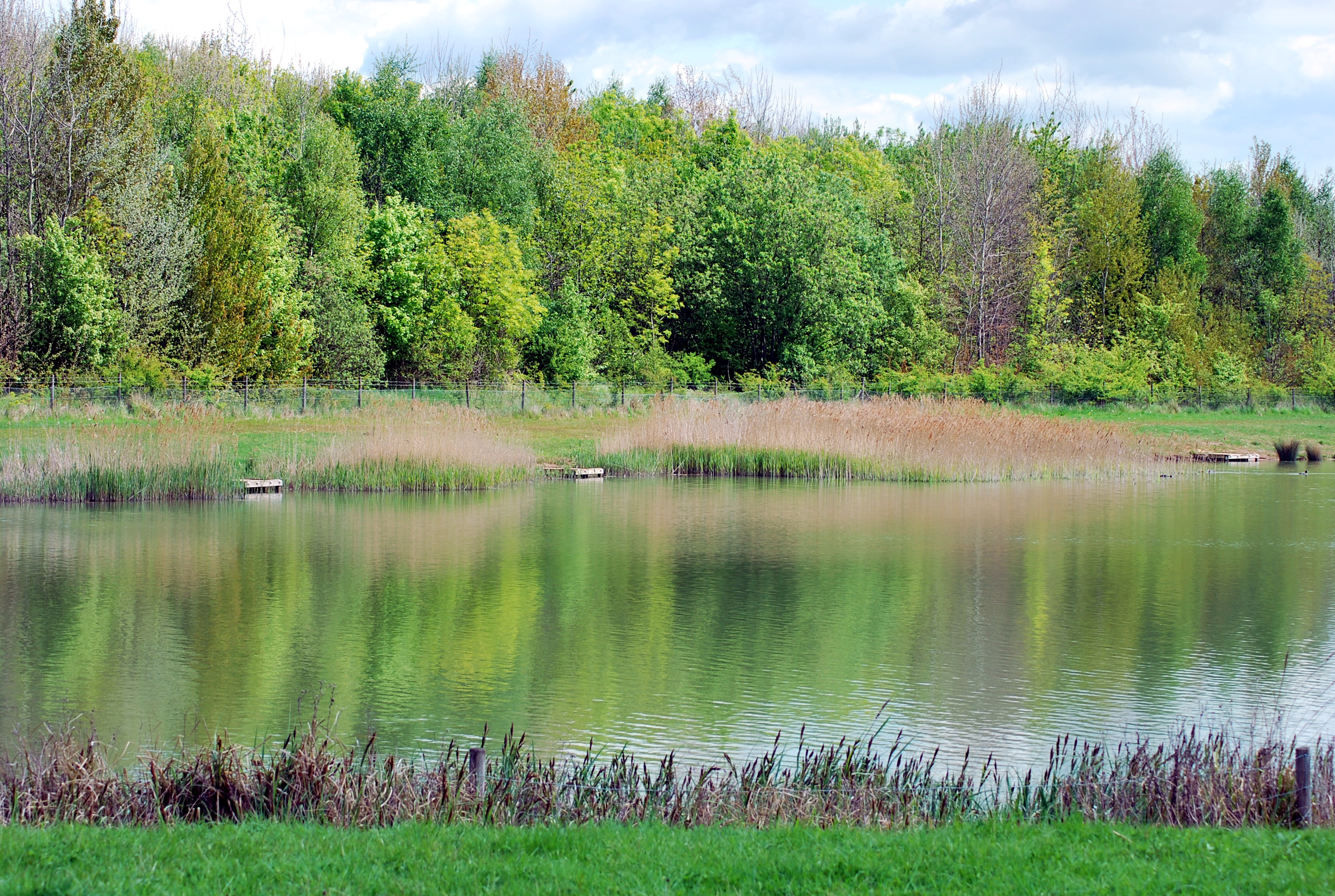
Country park lake in spring

The extensive former mining area has been landscaped as a country park, with a long section of the Grantham Canal partially restored, including at least two locks. This is not presently navigable, but nearby road bridges have been removed. though in other areas of the Grantham Canal some bridges have been rebuilt to accommodate canal traffic. Plans to put the canal back to water were gradually taking shape, and as a brownfield site in a rural area, the old pit-head area could serve for building a marina. This pit-head area is cordoned off from public and there are plans for redevelopment. Plans to build around 470 houses on the site would impact the infrastructure and the ongoing development of the country park.

Planted woodland is now beginning to mature and the country park is gradually acquiring a diverse population of wildlife. Wildfowl abound, with reports of cuckoos, warblers, swallows, little ringed plover, yellow wagtail, ring ouzel, wheatear, chiffchaff and dabchicks. Great crested newts are reported to be established in the lake, and hares, rabbits, foxes, bats and owls are present. The lake, pictured, is well stocked and used by anglers regularly. Fishing platforms have been built around the lake and reed beds established to protect the breeding waterfowl, including a variety of ducks, coots, swans and heron.

The park has a picnic area, car parks, a gallop for horse riders and a nature trail. The area features woodland, lake and canal side walks, and takes a route along the old railway track, where a short section of original rails and sleepers has been left in place. A voluntary group called Friends of Cotgrave Country Park works to maintain and improve the facilities at the park, and meets regularly. The group in 2010–2012 helped to plan and build a swimming pool for dogs, away from the vulnerable wildlife in the country park's lake.

== See also ==
- Listed buildings in Cotgrave
