= Ernest Hayes (British Army soldier) =

British soldier

Ernest Hayes MM**
- Born: 16 April 1898; Cotgrave, Nottinghamshire, England
- Died: 19 February 1938 (aged 39)
- Burial place: Beeston, Nottinghamshire, England
- Military career
- Allegiance: United Kingdom
- Branch: British Army
- Service years: 1916–1918
- Rank: Corporal
- Service number: 203928
- Unit: King's Own Yorkshire Light Infantry
- Conflicts: World War I
- Awards: Military Medal (3)

Corporal Ernest Hayes MM** (16 April 1898 – 19 February 1938) was a soldier in the British Army. He was awarded the Military Medal (MM) three times for his conduct in the First World War and was one of only 180 men out of 115,600 to be awarded the Medal three times for his actions during the conflict.

== Early life ==
Ernest Hayes was born on 16 April 1898, in Cotgrave, Nottinghamshire.

== Military career ==
Hayes enlisted with the King's Own Yorkshire Light Infantry, also known as the KOYLI, in 1916. After initial training in England, he was then transferred to the Western front in France. During his time there, he took part in several major battles.

Hayes' Military Medal

He was awarded his first MM on 13 March 1918. In The London Gazette it reads: "203928 Pte. E. Hayes, Yorks. L.I. (Cotgrave)". His second MM was awarded for his part in securing the Sambre canal on 4 November 1918. The citation from the Army for his actions that day reads as:

"No. 203928 Cpl. E. Hayes:- For gallantry & devotion to duty during the successful attack on the Sambre canal, S.W. of Landrecies on the 4th of November 1918. In the face of an intense enemy artillery & machine gun barrage he led his Lewis gun section forward through very close country with great skill, onto his objective. On arrival there he consolidated his post & for some hours kept his gun team in action under heavy enemy fire. He was utterly regardless of personal danger & his calm method of picking up target after target had a most inspiring effect on the men in his post & other posts in his vicinity".

Ernest Hayes Memorial

This was dated 26 November 1918. His first bar was awarded in 1919 and is mentioned in the London Gazette on 23 July 1919. His second bar was awarded in 1920.

== Death ==
Ernest Hayes died on 19 February 1938, at the age of just 39. He is buried in Beeston cemetery, Nottinghamshire. His grave remained unmarked until 2005, when his youngest daughter Barbara, with the help of the Royal British Legion, placed a memorial stone upon his grave.
