= William Upton (cricketer) =

English cricketer

Personal information
- Full name: William Upton
- Born: 14 June 1804; Cotgrave, Nottinghamshire, England
- Died: 1867 (aged 62–63); Cotgrave, Nottinghamshire, England
- Batting: Unknown

Domestic team information
- Years: Team
- 1827–1828: Nottingham Cricket Club

Career statistics
Competition	First-class
Matches	2
Runs scored	17
Batting average	5.66
100s/50s	–/–
Top score	9*
Catches/stumpings	–/–
- Source: Cricinfo, 20 February 2013

William Upton (14 June 1804 – 1867) was an English cricketer. Upton's batting style is unknown. He was born at Cotgrave, Nottinghamshire.

Upton made two first-class appearances for Nottingham Cricket Club, with both appearances coming against Sheffield Cricket Club at Darnall New Ground in 1827 and 1828. He scored at total of 17 runs in his two matches at an average of 5.66, with a high score of 9 not out.

He died at the village of his birth at some point in 1867.
