= Church of St Mary and All Saints, Willoughby-on-the-Wolds =

Church in Nottinghamshire, England

Coordinates: 52°49′22″N 01°03′39″W

Church of St. Mary and All Saints, Willoughby-on-the-Wolds
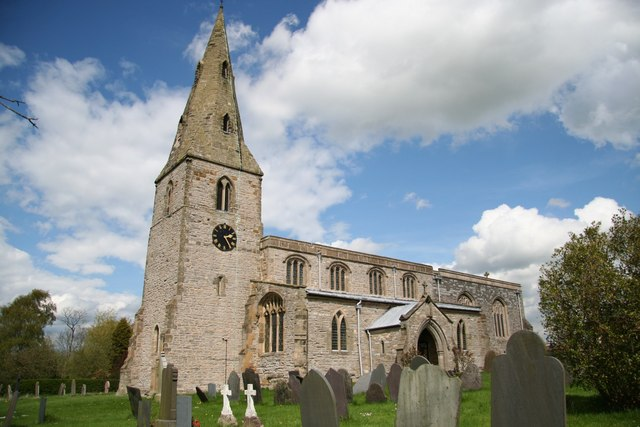
- Church of St. Mary and All Saints, Willoughby-on-the-Wolds
- Denomination: Church of England
- Churchmanship: Broad Church

History
- Dedication: St. Mary and All Saints

Administration
- Province: York
- Diocese: Southwell and Nottingham
- Parish: Willoughby on the Wolds

The Church of St. Mary and All Saints, Willoughby-on-the-Wolds is a parish church in the Church of England in Willoughby on the Wolds, Nottinghamshire, England.

== History ==
The church, dedicated to St Mary, is medieval and contains many ancient monuments of the Willoughbys, ancestors of Lord Middleton, whose predecessors sold this lordship many years ago to various proprietors.

== Parish status ==
The church is in a cluster comprising:

- St. Peter and St. Paul's Church, Widmerpool
- Church of St. Mary and All Saints, Willoughby-on-the-Wolds
- Holy Trinity Church, Wysall

== Organ ==
The church has a pipe organ by E. Wragg & Son. A specification of the pipe organ can be found on the National Pipe Organ Register.

== See also ==
- Grade I listed buildings in Nottinghamshire
- Listed buildings in Willoughby on the Wolds
