= Wysall =

Village and civil parish in Nottinghamshire, England

Coordinates: 52.84°N 1.10°W

- Village and civil parish
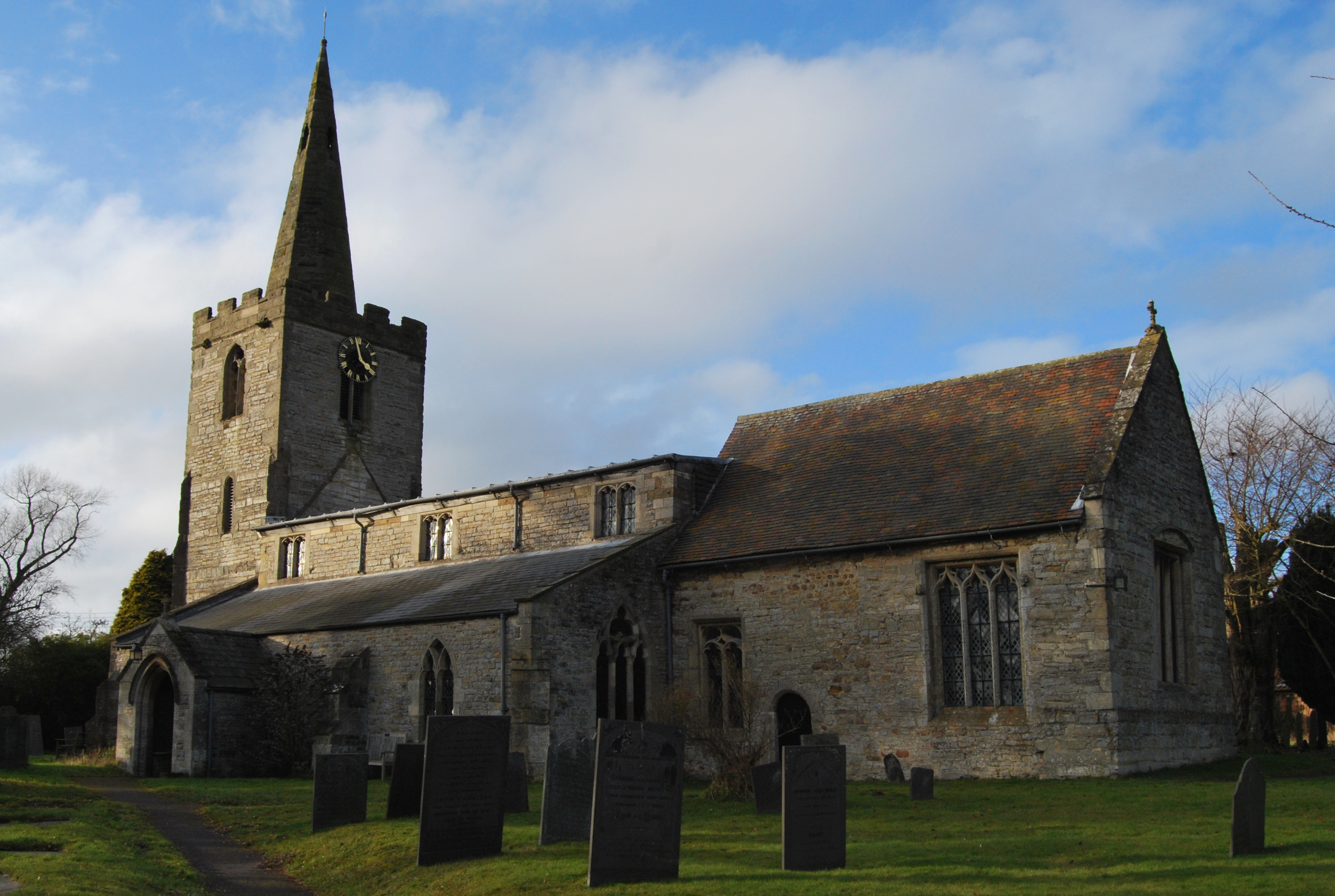
- Holy Trinity Church, Wysall

- Location within Nottinghamshire
- Interactive map of Wysall
- Area: 2.4 sq mi (6.2 km^{2})
- Population: 367 (2021)
  - Density: 153/sq mi (59/km^{2})
- OS grid reference: SK 700793
  - London: 100 mi (160 km) SSE
- District: Borough of Rushcliffe
- Shire county: Nottinghamshire
- Region: East Midlands
- Country: England
- Sovereign state: United Kingdom
- Post town: NOTTINGHAM
- Postcode district: NG12
- Dialling code: 01509
- Police: Nottinghamshire
- Fire: Nottinghamshire
- Ambulance: East Midlands
- UK Parliament: Rushcliffe
- Website: http://www.wysall.com

Wysall is a village and civil parish in Nottinghamshire, England. It is 11 miles (18 km) south of Nottingham. According to the 2001 census it had a population of 321, including Thorpe-on-the-Glebe and increasing to 431 at the 2011 census. Wysall singularly reported 367 residents at the 2021 census. Holy Trinity Church, Wysall is Norman, with a 13th-century tower with spire and a 14th-century chancel. The wooden ladder into the bell-chamber of the tower is also 13th century.

Wysall is linked with the neighbouring village of Thorpe in the Glebe, and the two villages are run by Wysall and Thorpe in the Glebe Parish Council. Every summer, Wysall hosts the annual Strawberry Fair at the village hall.

The village is neighboured by the large village of Keyworth to the north, Widmerpool to the east, Willoughby on the Wolds to the south east, Wymeswold to the south and Costock to the south west. Wysall is one of the Thankful Villages – those rare places that suffered no fatalities during the Great War of 1914 to 1918. The village is featured on Darren Hayman's album, Thankful Villages Volume 3.

== Early recorded history ==
In 1558, Mary I of England granted the Patronage of Wysall to Nicholas Heath, then Archbishop of York.

== Wysall Church ==
See Holy Trinity Church, Wysall

== History ==
=== A sad tale from 1843 ===
The village has seen some less happy times. In 1843, a very sad story emerged from the village which made the national news for some time. Extracts from some newspaper reports from the time appear below.

The Times, Wednesday 31 May 1843

Supposed Murder of a Son by his Father

Last week the neighbourhood of Wymeswold was in a state of considerable excitement, caused by the discovery of the body of a gentleman named Isaac Kettleband, of Wysall, in a pond on the farm of Mr. Hebb ... Circumstances subsequently transpired which led to the apprehension of the father of the deceased, on suspicion of having committed the murder. On Wednesday and Thursday last an inquest was held before Mr. Swan, coroner, when it appeared that the deceased was last seen alive with his father near the pond in question on the 12th instant. Mr. Brown, of Wymeswold, surgeon, was of opinion that the neck of the unfortunate youth had first been broken, and that his body was afterwards thrown into the pond. The inquest was adjourned to the 30th instant, and the father of the deceased was committed to Nottingham Gaol to await the result.

The Times, Saturday 3 June 1843

Wilful Murder

On Friday, May 10, a lad named Isaac Kettleband, aged 10 years, son of William Kettleband, of Wysall, labourer, was missing. On the Tuesday following his body was found in a horse-pond, on the farm of Mr. Henry Hebb, situated near to a barn and a stable, at which the deceased and his father usually worked. An inquest was held on the body the same evening before Mr. C. Swann, coroner, and no evidence to the contrary being adduced, a verdict of "Accidentally drowned" was returned. On the same evening and during the next day, the village gossips, in talking the affair over, began to think it possible that foul play might have been used, as the father of the deceased was known to be a violent and passionate man, and it was notorious that he had always most shamefully and brutally maltreated the boy. Mr. Browne, of Wymeswold, surgeon, was sent for to examine the body, and he at once discovered that the neck was dislocated, and gave it as his most decided opinion that it was broken before the body reached the water. The pond in which deceased was found is about 10 ½ yards by 4, and a yard and a half or two yards deep in some parts; it is, except at one corner, surrounded by a dead fence, about 4 feet high, and is so situate that the boy could not possibly have broken his neck in falling in accidentally. These circumstances, connected with the anxiety the father exhibited to have the corpse interred before any surgical examination took place, excited such suspicions that the deceased had been unfairly "done to death," that a second inquest was decreed indispensable. Accordingly a notice was sent to the coroner, and Kettleband was taken into custody. Mr. Swann consequently commenced a most rigid inquiry on Thursday, the 25th, which was at the close of the day adjourned until Monday last, the 29th. Mr. Hebb, in whose employ the deceased and his father were, has three farms – one at each of the villages of Wysall, Keyworth, and Stanton – and there is no residence on the farms at Wysall. The farm buildings are situate about a mile from the village, and stand the width of a very large field from the road; they consist of a barn and stables at right angles to each other, and the pond spoken of is not more than 25 or 30 yards distant. On Thursday a jury assembled at the Plough Inn, Wysall, before whom Mr. Swann commenced his inquiry, and a verdict was returned of "Wilful murder against some person or persons unknown." The prisoner was then discharged out of custody.

William Kettleband was subsequently tried for his son's murder at the Winter Assizes, Midland Circuit, Nottingham on Tuesday 19 December 1843. Astonishingly, the jury acquitted him of the murder despite evidence that the boy had suffered much abuse at the hands of his father, and despite evidence that the father had clearly attempted to cover up the crime by riding horses through the pond in an effort to make it look as though the injuries had been caused by the horses. Instead, he was convicted of manslaughter and sentenced to penal transportation for life.

=== Remarkable foot race in 1847 ===
The Derby Mercury, Wednesday 18 August 1847

On Thursday the 5th instant, at the quiet village of Wysall, a somewhat remarkable foot-race took place – remarkable, not for the distance run, nor for the speed of the runners, but for the fact that each of them has been running a race with old Time for more than ninety years – one having exceeded his great climacteric 28, the other 33 years. The distance was forty yards. The competitors were – Mr. Wootton Bryans, sen., aged 96, and Mr. John Hogg, aged 91 – the latter winning by just a yard – which so nettled or rather mettled his rival, that he challenged him to jump for a guinea. When this match is to come off, or whether the challenge was accepted, we have not learnt.

=== Death by oyster ===
With the Old Market Square in Nottingham being a popular destination for the nineteenth-century Wysall farmer, you would expect these hard workers to be treated well in town. If the following story is anything to go by, the remaining farmers in the area would be wise to consider giving up seafood.

The Pall Mall Gazette (London, England), Monday 17 February 1868; Issue 942

On Saturday night Mr. Richard Marshall, farmer, of Wysall, near Nottingham, met with his death by an extraordinary misadventure. He went to an oyster stall in the Market-place, Nottingham, and ordered some oysters to be opened. The first handed to him was a very large one, and stuck in his throat. He was unable to dislodge it, fell to the ground gasping for breath, and was carried at once to the hospital, but died on his way. The deceased was a married man and has left a large family.
