= Listed buildings in Widmerpool =

Widmerpool is a civil parish in the Rushcliffe district of Nottinghamshire, England. The parish contains four listed buildings that are recorded in the National Heritage List for England. Of these, one is listed at Grade II*, the middle of the three grades, and the others are at Grade II, the lowest grade. The parish contains the village of Widmerpool and the surrounding area. All the listed buildings are in the village, and consist of a church, a former country house, and two smaller houses.

== Key ==
Grade	Criteria
II*	Particularly important buildings of more than special interest
II	Buildings of national importance and special interest

== Buildings ==
Name and location	Photograph	Date	Notes	Grade
St Peter and St Paul's Church; 52.84770°N 1.06792°W		14th century	The church has been altered and extended through the centuries, including a restoration in 1836–37, and, apart from the tower, it was substantially rebuilt between 1888 and 1895,. The church is built in stone with roofs of lead and tile, and consists of a nave with a clerestory, north and south aisles, a south porch, a chancel, a north organ chamber, a south vestry and a west tower. The tower has a single stage, with buttresses, a west stair turret, a west three-light arched window, rectangular windows, two-light bell openings, gargoyles, and an embattled parapet. The porch and the chancel have embattled parapets and crocketed pinnacles. The porch is gabled, and has an arched doorway with a moulded surround and colonnettes, and a crocketed hood mould with an ogee head, above which is a niche containing a carved figure.	II*
The Old Rectory; 52.84588°N 1.06511°W		Early 19th century	The rectory, later a private house, is in stone, mainly rendered, on a plinth, with a floor band, an eaves band, and a hipped slate roof. There are two storeys and six bays. Two bays on the front projects and one contains a doorway with pilasters, a decorative fanlight and a pediment. The windows on the front are cross-casements. The garden front has three bays and contains sash windows.	II
Gardener's Cottage; 52.84758°N 1.06557°W		1832	The cottage is in rendered stone and brick, and has a tile roof, and gables with bargeboards. There is a single storey and an attic, and three bays, the left bay projecting and gabled, with a round clock face in the gable. On the front is a lean-to porch with a Tudor arched entrance and the date above. The windows are casements with Gothic glazing, and in the attic is a gabled dormer with tile-hung sides.	II
Widmerpool Hall; 52.84957°N 1.06742°W		1872–73	A country house designed by Henry Clutton, later divided into apartments. It is in stone with a tile roof, and an irregular plan, the entrance block with two storeys and attics, 16 bays, and four coped gables with finials. The widows are casements. There is a clock tower in Inanimate style, with two stages, mock machicolations, bands, a panelled parapet, finials and gargoyles. The garden front has nine bays, and contains three two-storey canted bay windows.	II
