= Holy Trinity Church, Wysall =

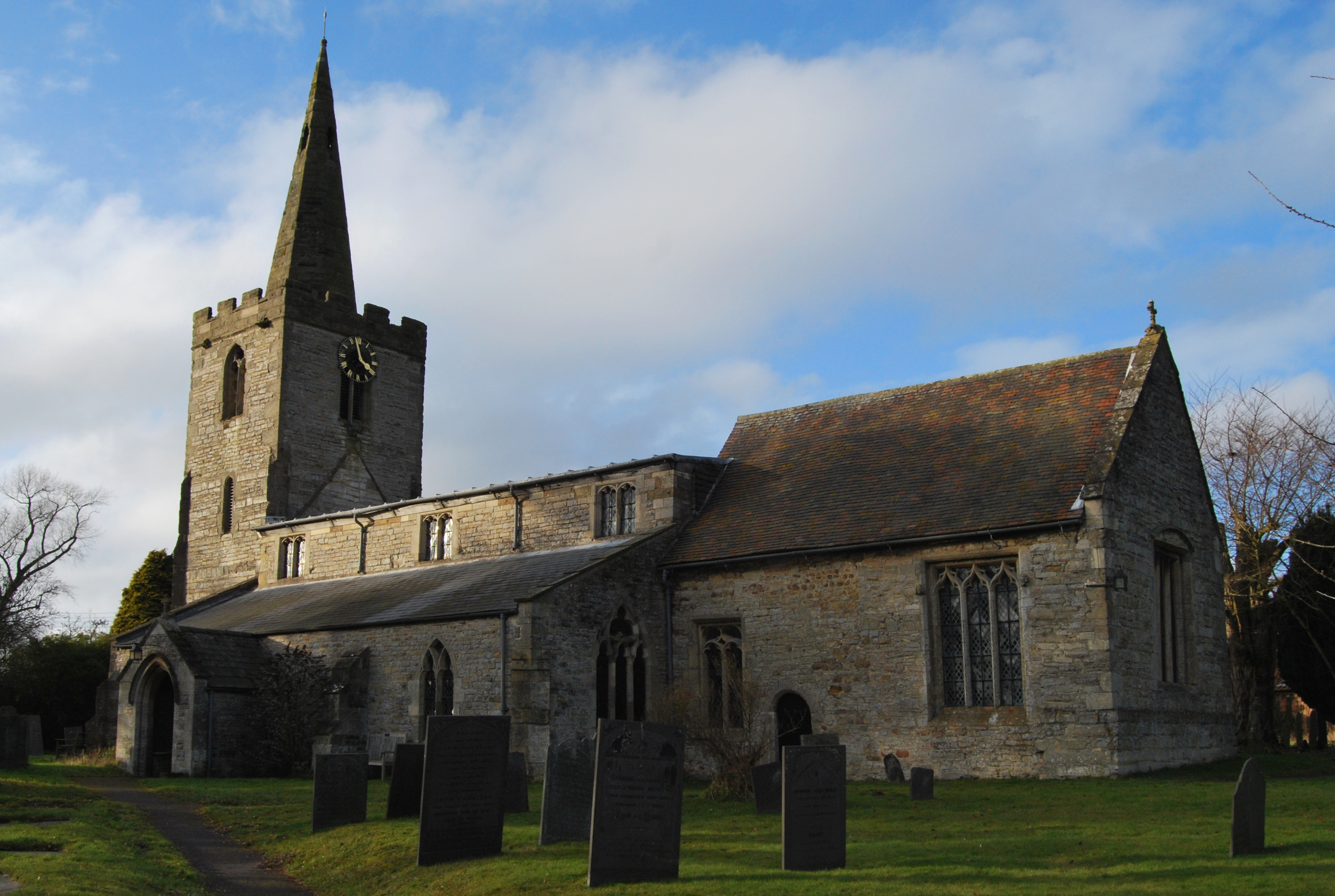
- Holy Trinity Church, Wysall
- 52°50′19″N 01°06′16″W
- Denomination: Church of England
- Churchmanship: Broad Church
- Website: www.wysall.com/links.htm#church

History
- Dedication: Holy Trinity

Administration
- Province: York
- Diocese: Southwell and Nottingham
- Parish: Wysall

Clergy
- Priest: Rev. Dr. Stephen David Hippisly-Cox

Holy Trinity Church, Wysall is a parish church in the Church of England in Wysall.

== History ==
Wysall Church, dedicated to the Holy Trinity, enjoys a prominent position towards the south end of the village on a bluff. The origins of the church are medieval, with some parts of the building dating back to the 13th century.

The church is visible for many miles and consists of a tower with spire, south porch, nave with south aisle and chancel. The graveyard has a near circular boundary wall. The tower, with embattlements, displays signs of gothic architecture of the decorated period dating it around the late 13th to 14th century. The lower part of the tower has a window of perpendicular style suggesting late 14th century though, as is often the case, there are features of the north wall that are Early English work predating the tower by a hundred years or so. There is evidence of a high pitched roof traced on the tower. The south porch was restored in the late 19th century and other work to maintain this excellent early church in good condition is evident. The windows are well worth note. Wysall gives us an example of late Decorated work of a beautiful and simple kind. A carefully researched and prepared account of Wysall church can be found in the Thoroton Society Transactions.

Inside ornamental dedications to the families of Sacheverell and Armstrong, amongst other important families. Some original oak pews and the pulpit have survived the restoration though demoted to the West end. The roof of the chancel is very early and well worth note. The church is involved in local affairs within an excellent web site..

White's Directory of Nottinghamshire in 1853 gives the following description:

The church ... has some ancient monuments of the Armstrong family, and former vicars of this parish. The vicarage has been augmented with Queen Anne's Bounty, and is valued in the King's books at £4 11s 0½d. Sir Robert H. Bromley is the patron, purchased in 1837 of Earl of Gosford, and the Rev. Thomas P. Dodson the incumbent.

== Parish status ==
The church is in a cluster comprising:

- St. Peter and St. Paul's Church, Widmerpool
- Church of St. Mary and All Saints, Willoughby-on-the-Wolds
- Holy Trinity Church, Wysall

== Organ ==
Limited details of the pipe organ can be found on the National Pipe Organ Register
