= St Peter and St Paul's Church, Widmerpool =

Coordinates: 52°50′52″N 01°04′05″W

St. Peter's, Widmerpool
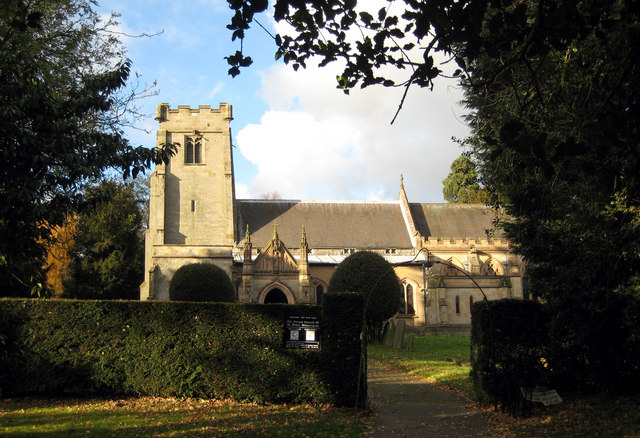
- St. Peter's, Widmerpool
- Denomination: Church of England
- Churchmanship: Broad Church

History
- Dedication: St. Peter

Administration
- Province: York
- Diocese: Southwell and Nottingham
- Parish: Widmerpool

Clergy
- Priest: Rev'd Dr Stephen Hippisley-Cox

St. Peter's Church, Widmerpool is a parish church in the Church of England in Widmerpool.

== History ==
It is uncertain how long there has stood a church on this site but "The Buildings of England, Nottinghamshire" makes reference to the later church emanating "From the original medieval structure" The Anglican parish register has records dating from 1539. Originally dedicated to St. Peter and St. Paul, the church is now formally known as St Peter's.

The old church was in a poor state of repair and neglect when the Robertsons acquired the estate and was rebuilt in 1832. Unfortunately the handsome Gothic spire was struck by lightning some four years later, demolishing half of the spire and breaking all the glass windows. The remaining spire was then removed and the church rebuilt yet again at a cost of £10,000 in the period 1888–1895. This involved considerable financial help from the Robertson (Robinson) family. A tower replaced the spire and has three bells. The churchyard is ornamentally planted with evergreens.

During the civil war two soldiers that were killed at the Battle of Willoughby Fields nearby were buried in the graveyard. There is a roll of honour, commemorating the two world wars, on the south wall. Inside is a plaque above the door to the vestry. To each side of the pillars inside of the south door are carved head ornaments, one of a lion and the other a bull. The graveyard is well kept and planted with evergreens. Close by is a large copse and nature reserve.

== Parish Status ==
The church is a part of a united benefice comprising:

- St. Peter's, Widmerpool
- St. Mary and All Saints, Willoughby-on-the-Wolds, and
- Holy Trinity, Wysall

== Organ ==
The church has a pipe organ by Hunter dating from the 1890s with a fine carved case. A specification of the pipe organ can be found on the National Pipe Organ Register

== See also ==
- Grade II* listed buildings in Nottinghamshire
- Listed buildings in Widmerpool
