= Widmerpool Hall =

Country house in Nottinghamshire, England

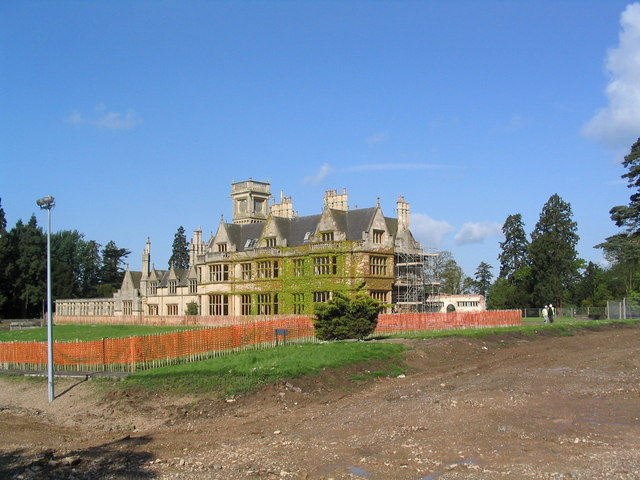
- Widmerpool Hall

- Location within Nottinghamshire

General information
- Coordinates: 52.849437°N 1.067443°W
- Opened: 1872
- Client: Major George Coke Robertson

Design and construction
- Architect: Henry Clutton
- Designations: Grade II listed building

Widmerpool Hall is a Grade II listed English country house in Widmerpool, Nottinghamshire.

Situated on the north side of the village, it was built in 1872 for Major George Coke Robertson to the designs of Henry Clutton. This neo-Gothic manor house was constructed of Bath and Clipsham stone. It has an Italianate, gargoyle adorned clock-tower without a clock; the space for the clock was left blank out of respect for Robertson's recently deceased wife.

It remained a private residence until the breakup of the estate in the 1950s. For several decades at the end of the twentieth century, it was the headquarters of The Automobile Association Patrol Service Training School, popularly known as 'The AA Academy'. British Pathé recorded some of the activities there in 'The AA Story', in 1967.

Between 2008 and 2010 it underwent extensive renovation for residential purposes; and this has provided 9 apartments, 11 mews style houses and 4 detached houses. The hall is grade II listed.

== See also ==
- Listed buildings in Widmerpool
