= Thorpe in the Glebe =

Hamlet and civil parish in Nottinghamshire, England

Coordinates: 52.825088°N 1.100682°W

- Hamlet and civil parish
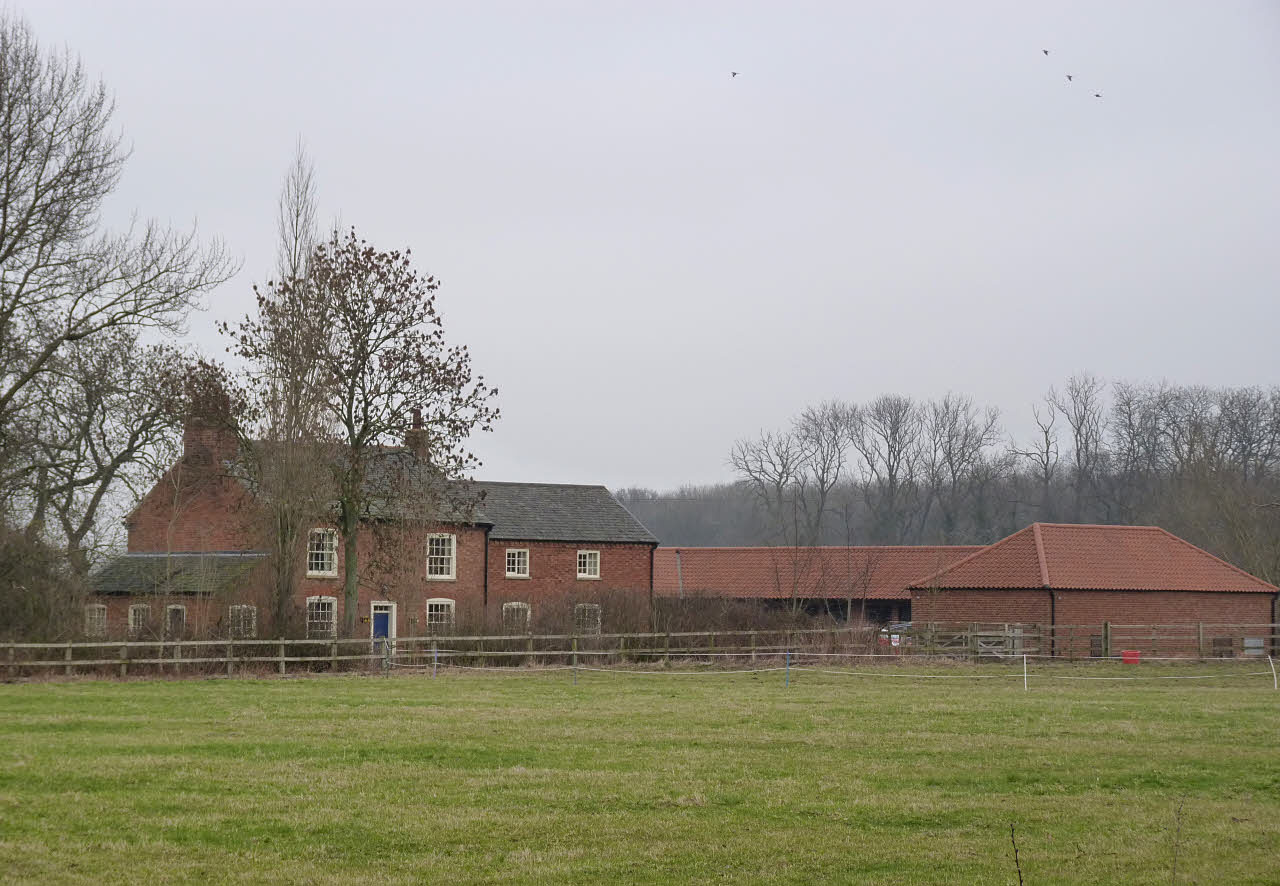
- Annabell's Farm

- Location within Nottinghamshire
- Interactive map of Thorpe in the Glebe
- Area: 1.33 sq mi (3.4 km^{2})
- Population: 22 (2021)
  - Density: 17/sq mi (6.6/km^{2})
- OS grid reference: SK 605262
  - London: 100 mi (160 km) SSE
- District: Rushcliffe
- Shire county: Nottinghamshire
- Region: East Midlands
- Country: England
- Sovereign state: United Kingdom
- Post town: NOTTINGHAM
- Postcode district: NG12
- Dialling code: 01509
- Police: Nottinghamshire
- Fire: Nottinghamshire
- Ambulance: East Midlands
- UK Parliament: Rushcliffe
- Website: https://www.wysall.com/about-thorpe-in-the-glebe.html

Thorpe in the Glebe was a village in Nottinghamshire, England to the south of Wysall on the Leicestershire border. It was sometimes called Thorpe in the Clottes. Tradition has it that the village was destroyed either at the Battle of Willoughby Field or alternatively by a hail-storm. However, at the time of the English Civil War, there had been no village at Thorpe in the Glebe for nearly 200 years.

The area is now a civil parish of the same name with an overwhelmingly rural area with scattered farms. It reported a resident population of 22 people at the 2021 census.

== History ==
The placename is from the Danish word 'torp', which was a farmstead or ancillary settlement dependent on a larger village, although there are signs the area was formerly populated much earlier with evidence of flint tools and Roman pottery. At the time the Domesday Survey, Thorpe in the Glebe was then known as Thorpe Regis or King's Thorpe and considered to be waste, with no population recorded and under two manors.

William II granted away his portion amongst other manors to Hugh de Avranches, the Earl of Chester, who made the Bochard (or Bozzart) family tenants. Roger Busli granted his portion of the land to a knight Roger de Luvetot with descendants continuing to own the manor until the middle of the 13th century. William de Luvetot founded Worksop Priory in 1120 and as a result Thorpe became a parish.

The village was eventually known as Thorpe Bochard (or Bochart), Thorpe Buzzard or Bochardisthorpe. These held the manors of Thorpe and Wysall until the male lineage died out by the 13th century, and both estates came to John Seagrave in Leicestershire via Margaret Bochard. A local rector was recorded by 1251 and evidence tangible of a church noted by 1291 although little else is known.

The Darleys, who were residents of Wysall, became stewards for the Seagraves at Thorpe and eventually obtained the manor in around 1300. The tax records then show that Thorpe was small and not of much wealth. Thorpe started to be referred to as Thorpe in the Glebe and alternatively as Thorpe in the Clottes in around the 14th century.

The land eventually descended to their relations the Armstrongs by the middle 15th century, and the agricultural focus was changed to sheep rearing which needed less labour. The remaining land not in their control was obtained by the later part of the century. Enclosure of the land took place in 1491 by Gabriel Armstrong and depopulation of the village may have started to take place by this time, although there is little evidence of this.

The family also maintained control of the farming and stopped leasing out the land. Signs of wide scale abandonment was evident by 1500 and the area described as a ruin in 1534. The local church tower was still standing in 1810 but by 1844 only overgrown ruins remained, with new vicars still attending the derelict site for their inductions until 1868. Remaining earthworks of the village are still evident to the present day and surround the Church Site farm.

== Governance ==
The population of Thorpe as recorded for the 2021 UK census is 22 residents amongst a scattered farming community. Thorpe along with its adjacent neighbour Wysall, although each are parished, they are grouped together to form a parish council for administrative efficiency due to their small populations, it is run from Wysall. Higher level authorities in charge of district and county wide administrative functions are Rushcliffe Borough Council and Nottinghamshire County Council.

== Conservation ==
Annabell's Farm is a currently listed building dating from 1805, it was built by Thomas Annabell who resided with his wife. A tomb housing both and dating from 1852 was built in the grounds of the property, and is also listed. Other local features of national interest are the Thorpe Lodge and Church Site farmhouses. The remaining earthworks of the medieval village are still evident to the present day and surround the Church Site farm, these are registered as a protected scheduled monument.

== External sites ==
- Wolds Historical Association
- Lost Village Sites of Nottinghamshire
