= Willoughby on the Wolds =

Village and civil parish in Nottinghamshire, England

Coordinates: 52.82°N 1.06°W

- Village and civil parish
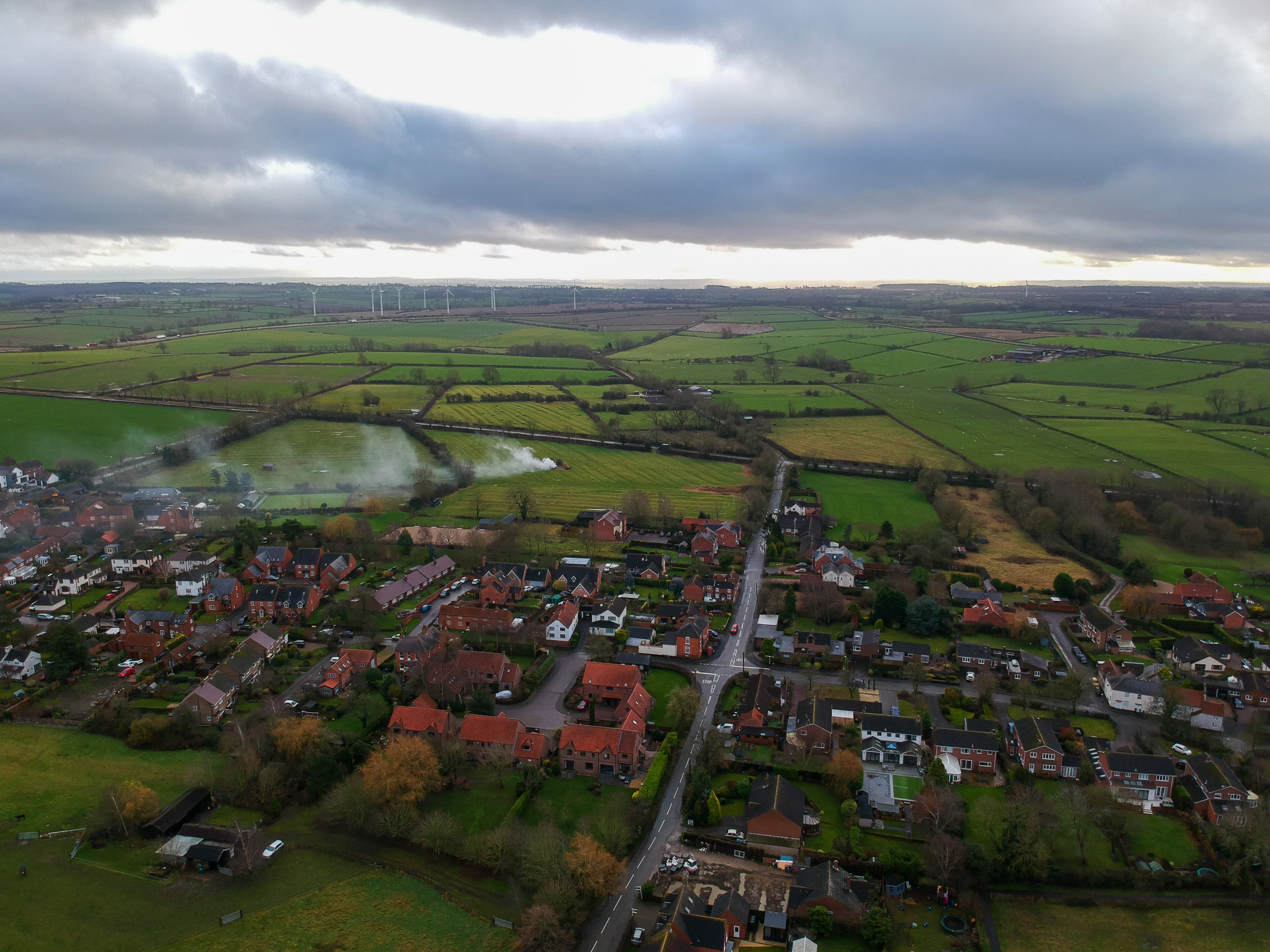
- Main Street and Widmerpool Lane, Willoughby on the Wolds

- Location within Nottinghamshire
- Interactive map of Willoughby on the Wolds
- Area: 2.09 sq mi (5.4 km^{2})
- Population: 572 (2011)
  - Density: 274/sq mi (106/km^{2})
- OS grid reference: SK637253
  - London: 100 mi (160 km) SSE
- District: Rushcliffe
- Shire county: Nottinghamshire
- Region: East Midlands
- Country: England
- Sovereign state: United Kingdom
- Post town: LOUGHBOROUGH
- Postcode district: LE12
- Dialling code: 01509
- Police: Nottinghamshire
- Fire: Nottinghamshire
- Ambulance: East Midlands
- UK Parliament: Rushcliffe
- Website: www.willoughbyonthewolds.com

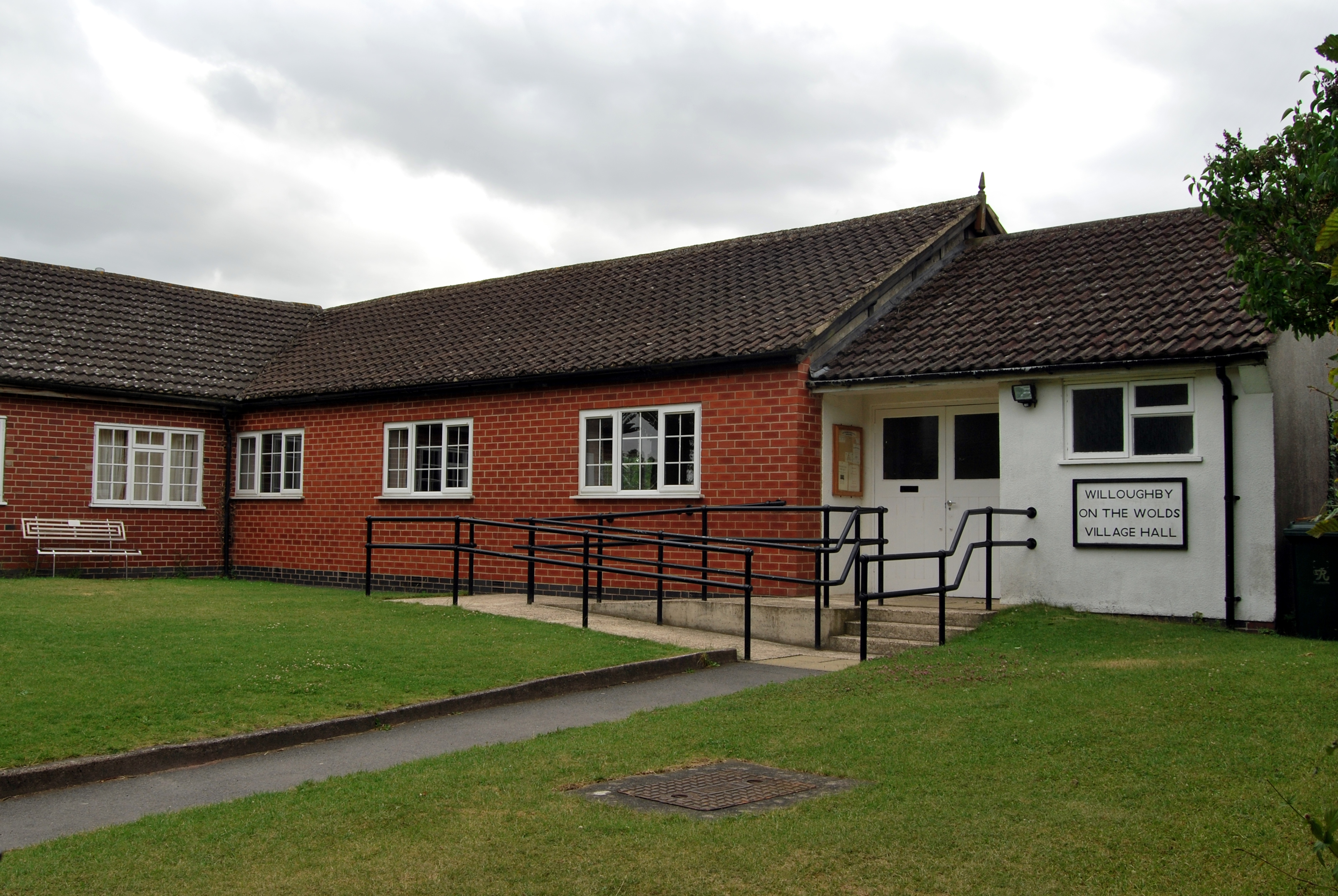
Willoughby on the Wolds Village Hall

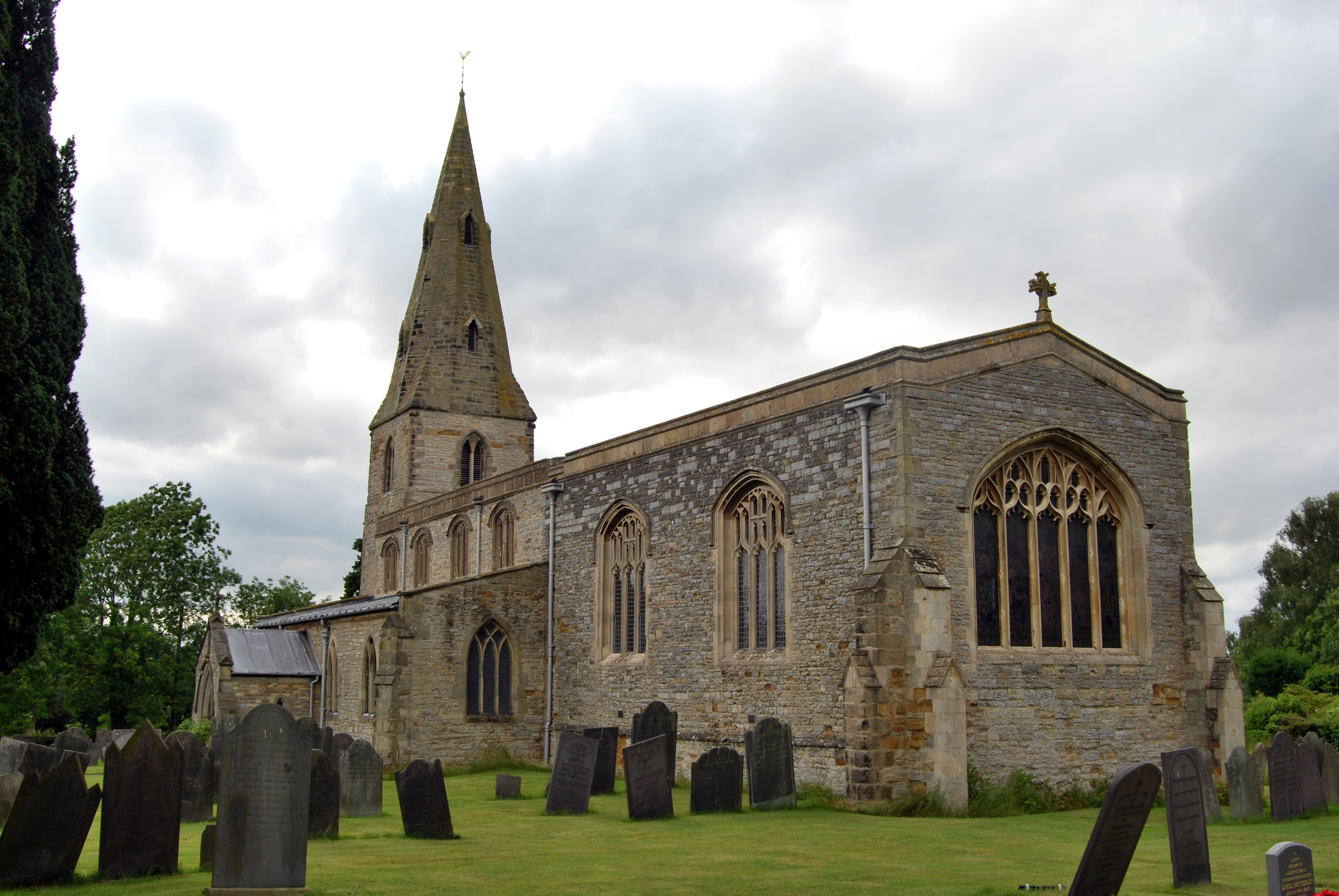
Willoughby on the Wolds St Marys and All Saints

Willoughby on the Wolds is a small village in Nottinghamshire, England, on the border with Leicestershire. Its nearest neighbouring villages are Wysall, Widmerpool, Wymeswold and Keyworth, with the nearest towns and cities being Loughborough, Melton Mowbray, Nottingham and Leicester. According to the 2001 census it had a population of 484, increasing to 572 at the 2011 census, and 583 at the 2021 census.

The village has its own parish council and comes within the jurisdiction of the Nottinghamshire County Council. The area postcode for the village, however, is in Leicestershire (LE12).

The village is the approximate location of the minor civil war battle of Willoughby Field which took place in July 1648. It is also closely linked with the Roman encampment of Vernometum on the Fosse way which runs only a few hundred yards from the village.

== See also ==
- Listed buildings in Willoughby on the Wolds
