= Listed buildings in Willoughby on the Wolds =

Willoughby on the Wolds is a civil parish in the Rushcliffe district of Nottinghamshire, England. The parish contains six listed buildings that are recorded in the National Heritage List for England. Of these, one is listed at Grade I, the highest of the three grades, and the others are at Grade II, the lowest grade. The parish contains the village of Willoughby on the Wolds and the surrounding area. All the listed buildings are in the village, and they consist of a church, houses, cottages and farmhouses, and associated structures.

== Key ==
Grade	Criteria
I	Buildings of exceptional interest, sometimes considered to be internationally important
II	Buildings of national importance and special interest

== Buildings ==
Name and location	Photograph	Date	Notes	Grade
Church of St Mary and All Saints; 52.82259°N 1.06085°W		13th century	The church has been altered and enlarged through the centuries. It is built in stone with lead roofs, and consists of a nave with a clerestory, north and south aisles, a south porch, a north chantry chapel, a chancel, and a west steeple. The steeple has a tower with two stages, a chamfered plinth, quoins, an arched west window, a south clock face, two-light bell openings, and a broach spire with two tiers of lucarnes.	I
Baxter Farmhouse; 52.82210°N 1.05039°W		Late 18th century	The farmhouse is in red brick with dentilled eaves and a tile roof. There are three storeys and a cellar, three bays, and a two-storey two-bay wing on the left. Steps with an iron handrail lead up to a central doorway with reeded pilasters, a fanlight and a bracketed hood, and the windows are sashes, those in the lower two floors with segmental heads.	II
Cottages on Main Street; 52.82212°N 1.05386°W		Late 18th century	Two cottages, formerly two cottages and a shop, in red brick, partly on a plinth, with dentilled eaves and a pantile roof. There are two storeys and eight bays. The doorways have reeded surrounds and hoods on brackets, and the windows are horizontally-sliding sashes, those in the ground floor with segmental heads.	II
The Haven; 52.82253°N 1.05277°W		Late 18th century	The house is in red brick on a plinth, with a painted wooden cornice and a pantile roof. There are two storeys and four bays. Steps lead up to the doorway that has reeded pilasters, a fanlight, and a hood on brackets, and the windows are sashes with segmental heads. To the left is a lower single-bay wing with dentilled eaves, and a casement window with a segmental head.	II
Outbuildings, The Haven; 52.82264°N 1.05296°W		Late 18th century	The two ranges of the former farmhouse buildings are in red brick. The north range has pantile roofs, and a single-storey stable with three semicircular-headed doorways and ventilator fanlights. The barn to its left has a single storey and a loft, a semicircular-headed doorway, and a window under a segmental arch. The west range has slate roofs, and a single-storey part to the south containing a cartshed and five arched openings. To the north is a taller three-bay open-fronted wagon shed, with a full length timber lintel and a cast iron column. The south gable end facing the road has dentilled verges.	II
High Elm Farmhouse and wall 52.82227°N 1.05025°W		Early 19th century	A red brick farmhouse on a plinth, with dogtooth eaves and a slate roof. There are three storeys and a cellar, and four bays. The doorway has fluted pilasters with paterae, a fanlight and a bracketed hood. To the left of the doorway is a cellar opening, and the windows are sashes, those in the two lower floors with segmental heads. In front of the house is a low brick wall with painted coping and decorative cast iron railings, containing a gateway with a similar iron gate.	II
