= Widmerpool =

Village and civil parish in Nottinghamshire, England

Coordinates: 52.85°N 1.06°W

- Village and civil parish
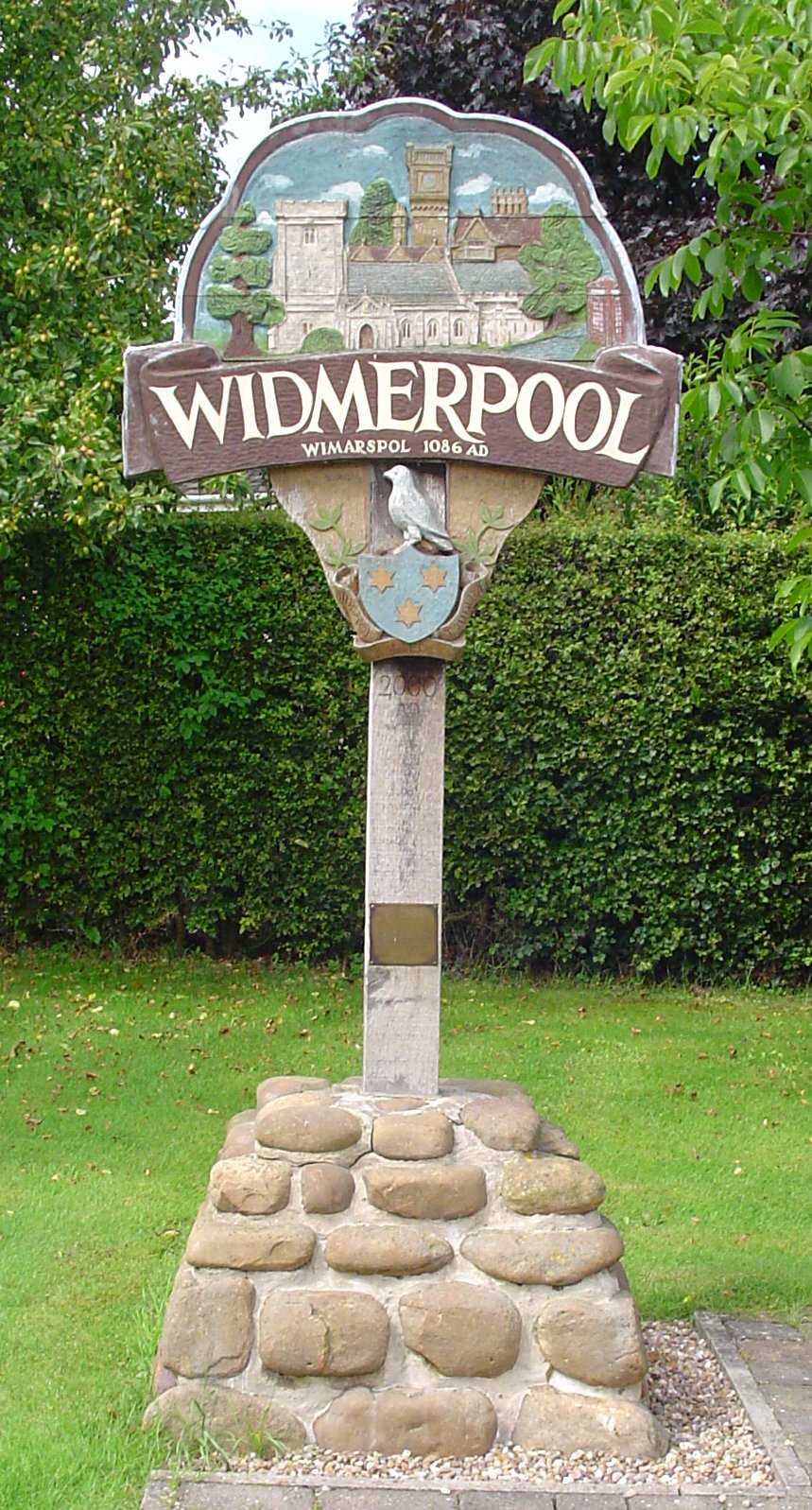
- Signpost in Widmerpool

- Location within Nottinghamshire
- Interactive map of Widmerpool
- Area: 3.29 sq mi (8.5 km^{2})
- Population: 327 (2021)
  - Density: 99/sq mi (38/km^{2})
- OS grid reference: SK 632280
  - London: 100 mi (160 km) SSE
- District: Rushcliffe
- Shire county: Nottinghamshire
- Region: East Midlands
- Country: England
- Sovereign state: United Kingdom
- Post town: NOTTINGHAM
- Postcode district: NG12
- Dialling code: 0115
- Police: Nottinghamshire
- Fire: Nottinghamshire
- Ambulance: East Midlands
- UK Parliament: Rushcliffe
- Website: www.widmerpoolparishcouncil.org.uk

Widmerpool is a village and civil parish in Nottinghamshire, about 10 miles south-south-east of Nottingham and some 7.5 miles north-east of Loughborough. It is one of Nottinghamshire's oldest settlements and is just over a mile west of the A46 (the Fosse Way). Extensive dual carriageway road works along the A46 have now been completed. At the time of the 2001 census it had a population of 262, increasing to 339 at the 2011 census, and falling slightly to 327 residents at the 2021 census. Until the 1960s there had not been any building in the village for 100 years.

Widmerpool is also the surname of a disreputable character in Anthony Powell's twelve-volume sequence of novels A Dance to the Music of Time. The connexion between the village and the character can be explored at Kenneth Widmerpool.

== History ==
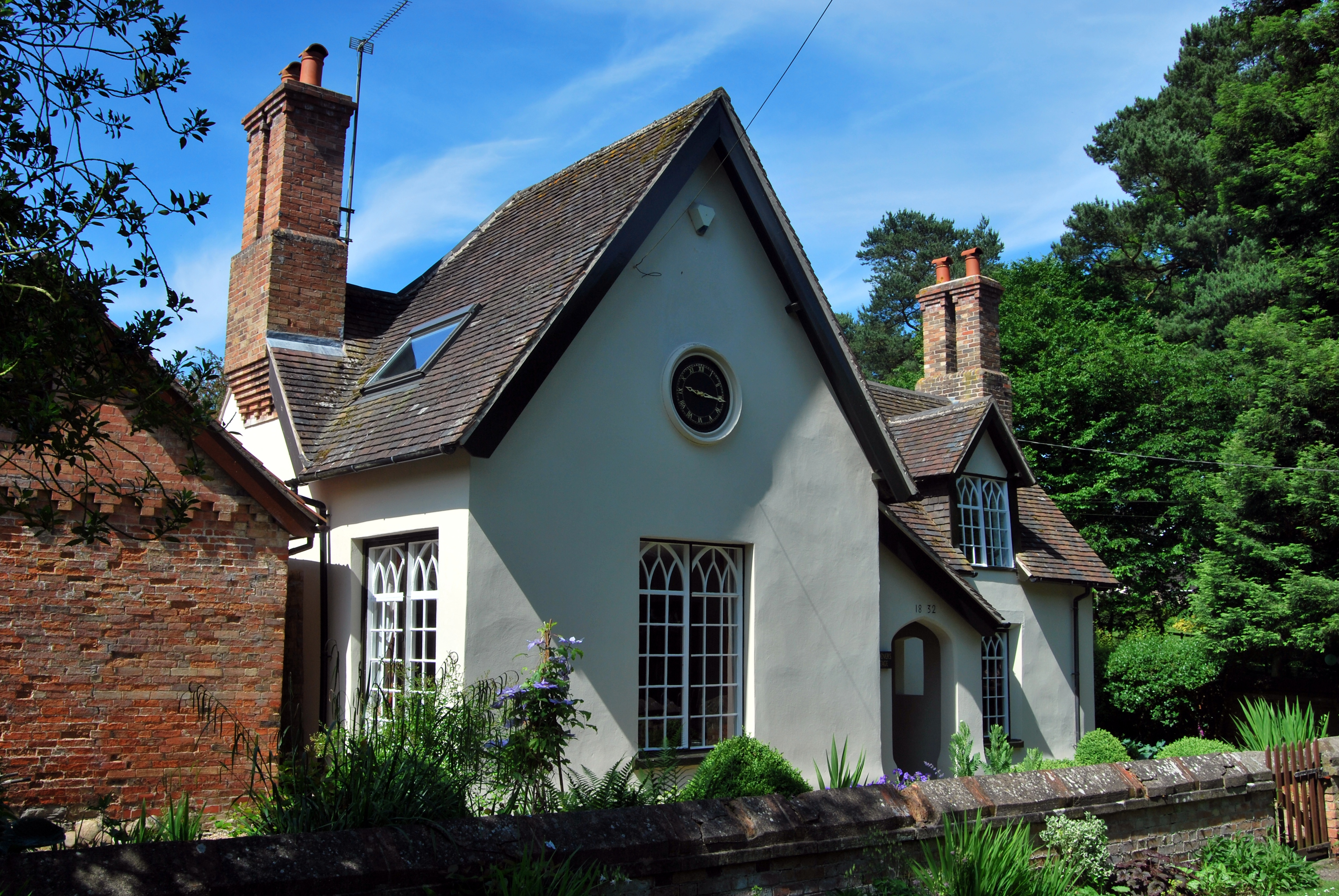
Gardener's Cottage

The history of the village is intrinsically linked to that of the family of the manor. A manor house is thought to have been present since Henricus de Diddisworth adopted the name of Widmerpoole to gain the estate for his family in 1216. A "Widmerpoole" family is recorded in 1283 in the village and a John de Widmerpoole attended a parliament in York in 1333. Since that time ownership of parts of the estate was, in the 17th and 18th centuries, contested by the Heriz, Pierrepont and Cromwell families it remained in Widmerpoole ownership until the early 19th century. The estate was then acquired by the Robertson (sometimes spelt Robinson) family. The Robertsons, famous for their jam, then embarked upon rebuilding of much of the estate including some of the oldest surviving buildings such as Gardener's Cottage, the Coach House, Home Farm and the Old School House. Widmerpool Hall on the north side of the village was built in 1872 for Major George Coke Robertson to the designs of Henry Clutton (designer of Lille Cathedral). This neo Gothic manor house was constructed of Bath and Clipsham stone and has an Italianate, gargoyle adorned clock-tower without a clock. The space for the clock was left blank out of respect for Robertson's recently deceased wife. It remained a private residence until the break-up of the estate in the 1950s then, for several decades at the end of the twentieth century, it was the HQ of the AA Patrol Service Training School, popularly known as 'The AA Academy'. Between 2008 and 2010, it underwent extensive renovation for residential purposes; and this has provided 9 apartments, 11 mews style houses and 4 detached houses. The hall is Grade II listed.

== The Church ==
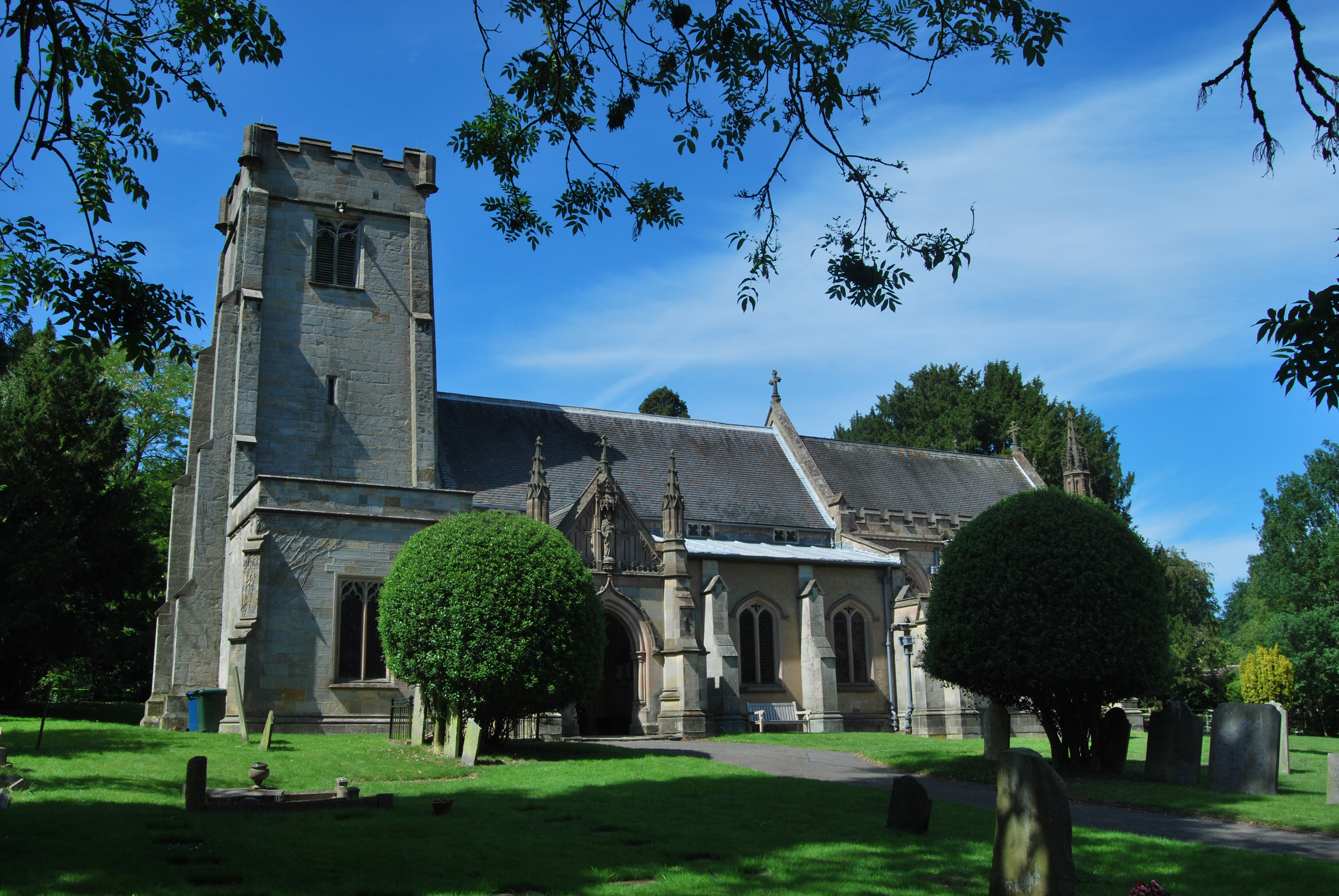
Widmerpool St Peters and St Pauls'

See St Peter and St Paul's Church, Widmerpool

A Baptist chapel and a Wesleyan Methodist chapel were built in the village by 1853.

== Now ==
During the 20th century employment of the villages by the estate gradually diminished and ceased with the advent of easier transport and machinery. The village residents, once consisting of farm workers, teachers, smiths, gardeners, grooms and the like almost entirely centred on agriculture and concerns of the estate largely, today, travel to work. The village no longer has its own school, nor a shop or a post office. The public house has shut and the village hall was sold in 1975. In 2007, Widmerpool received the 'Best Kept Village' award for Nottinghamshire.

== See also ==
- Listed buildings in Widmerpool

== Gallery ==
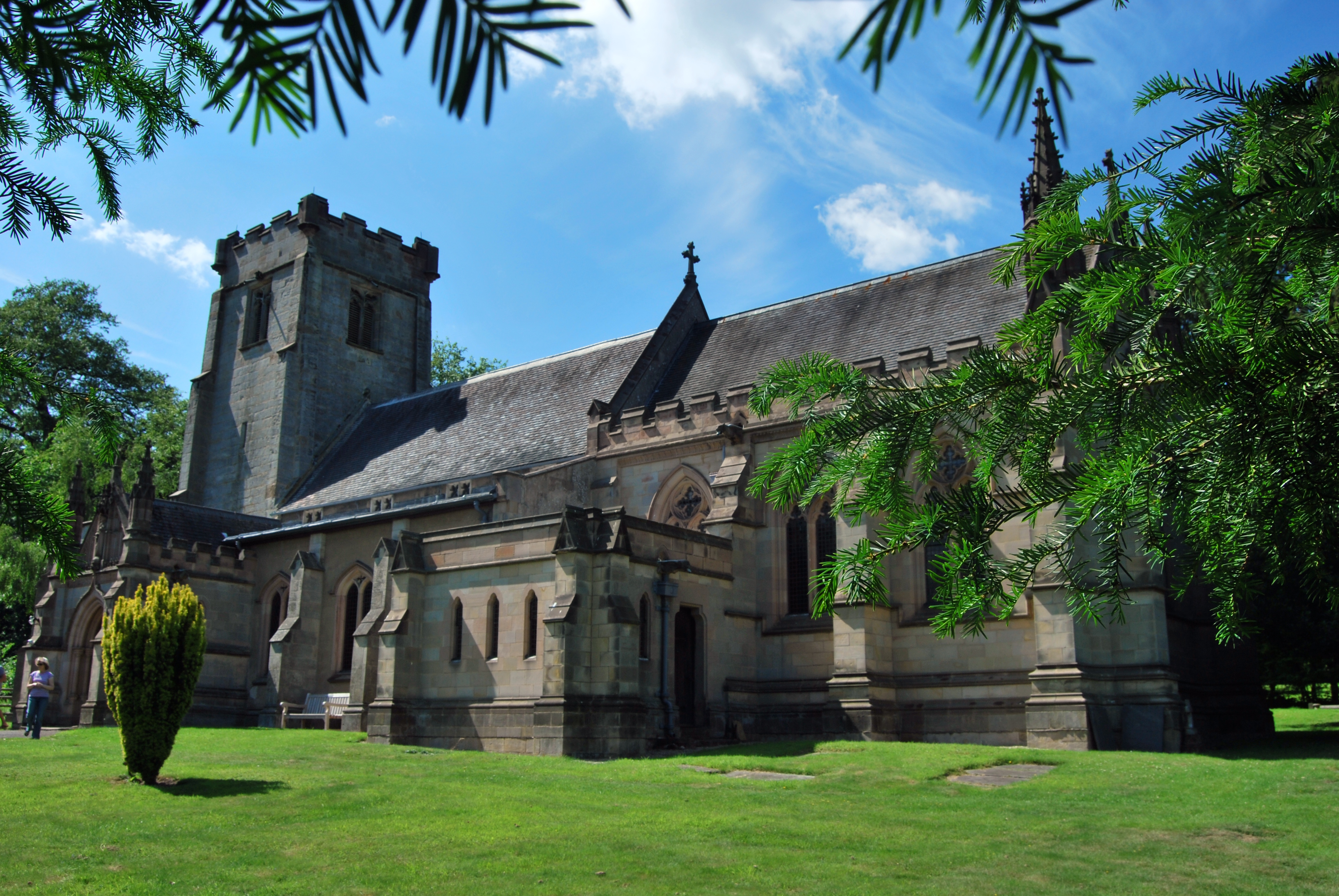
St Peters and St Pauls SE aspect

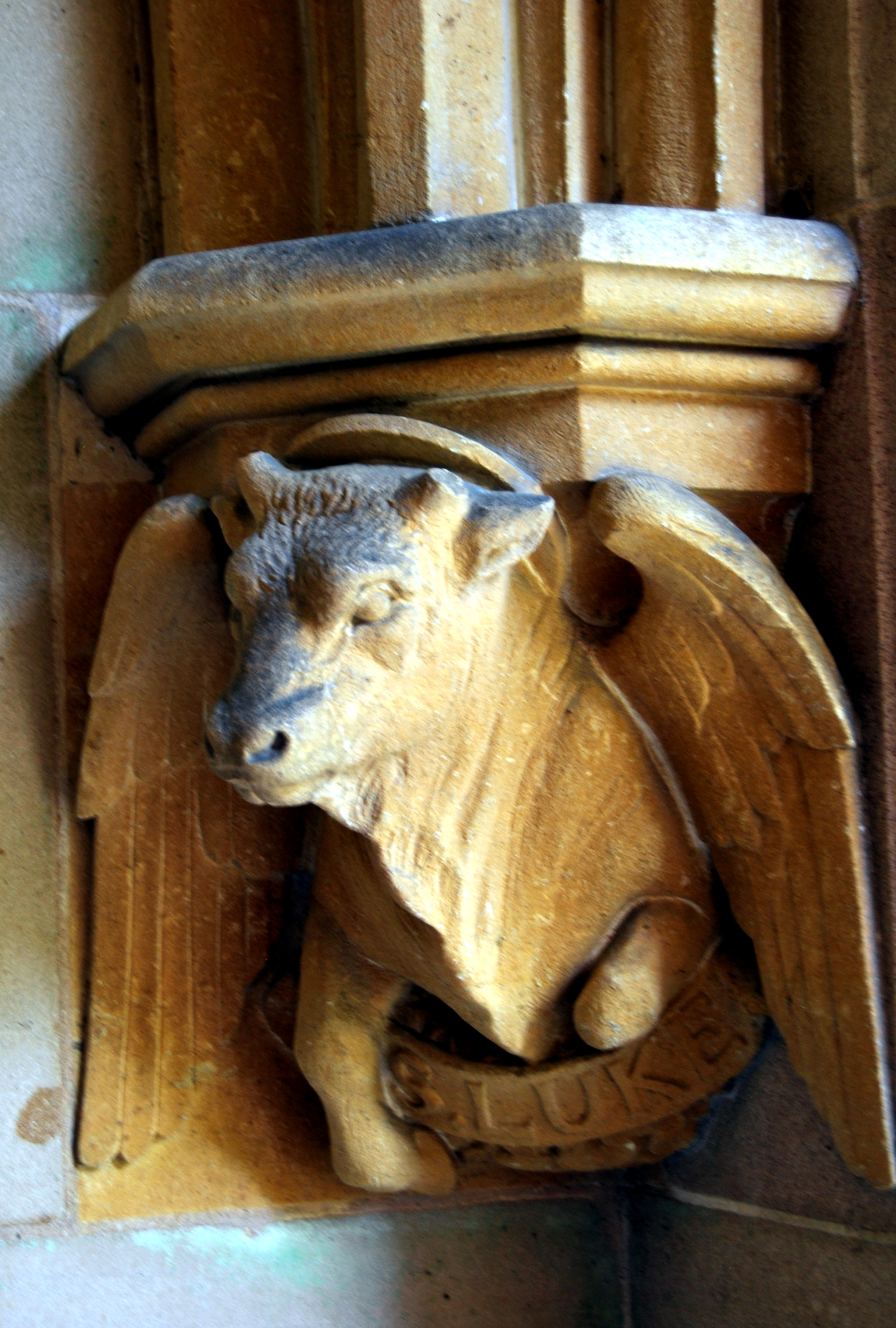
Widmerpool Church Winged Bull Corbel in porch

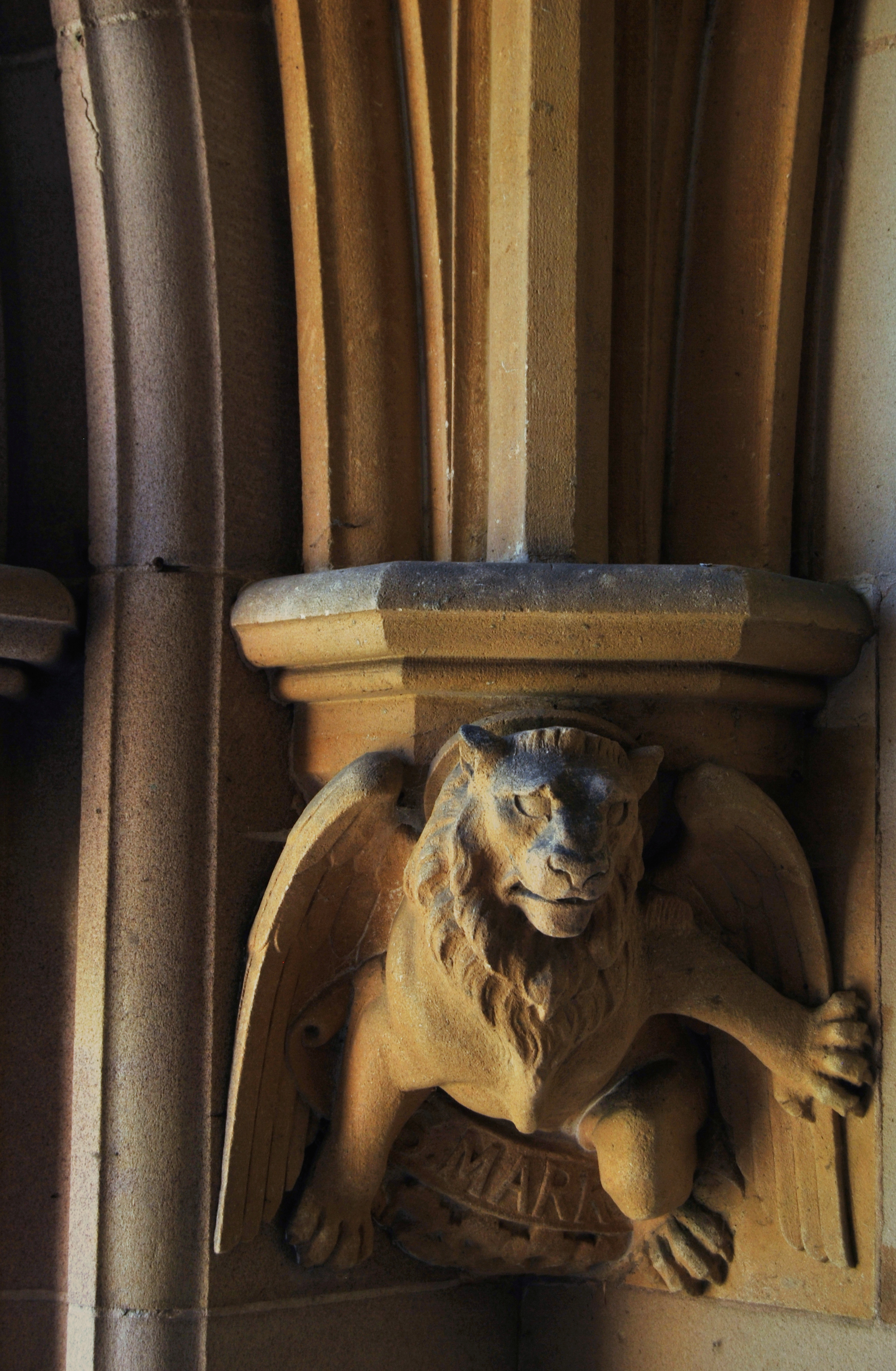
Widmerpool Church Winged Lion corbel

== Sources ==
There is a very detailed history of the village entitled Widmerpool: a Century of Change 1900 to 2000, produced by Geoff Brooks of New Manor Farm, Widmerpool.

Nottinghamshire: A Shell Guide by Henry Thorold, Faber and Faber, 1984

The Nottinghamshire Village Book, Nottinghamshire Federation of Women's Institutes, 1989
