= Our Lady and St Peter's Church, Bothamsall =

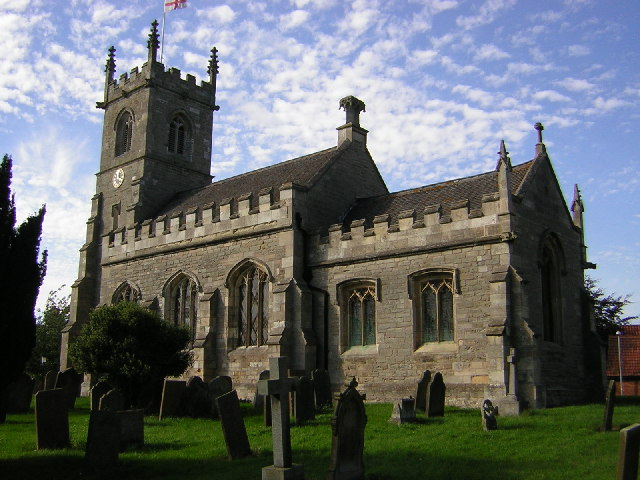
- Our Lady and St Peter's Church, Bothamsall
- Our Lady and St Peter's Church, Bothamsall
- 53°15′15.21″N 0°59′22.97″W
- OS grid reference: SK 67533 73399
- Location: Bothamsall
- Country: England
- Denomination: Church of England

History
- Dedication: Virgin Mary and St Peter

Architecture
- Heritage designation: Grade II listed

Administration
- Diocese: Southwell and Nottingham
- Archdeaconry: Newark
- Deanery: Bassetlaw and Bawtry
- Parish: Bothamsall

Our Lady and St Peter's Church, Bothamsall is a Grade II listed parish church in the Church of England in Bothamsall, Nottinghamshire, England. The church is part of the Lound Hall Estate, Bothamsall. The buildings repair costs are procured by the Lord of the manor.

== History ==
The church dates from the 14th century. A design by William Wilkins of 1817 was rejected and the church was rebuilt in 1845 by Henry Pelham-Clinton, 4th Duke of Newcastle with stone from Worksop Manor.

It is in a joint parish with

- St. Nicholas' Church, Askham
- All Saints' Church, Babworth
- St Martin's Church, Bole
- St John the Baptist Church, Clarborough
- All Saints' Church, Eaton
- St Giles' Church, Elkesley
- St Peter's Church, Gamston
- St. Helen's Church, Grove
- St Peter's Church, Hayton
- St Martin's Church, North Leverton
- St Peter and St Paul's Church, North Wheatley
- All Hallows' Church, Ordsall
- St Saviour's Church Retford
- St Swithun's Church, East Retford
- St Michael the Archangel's Church, Retford
- All Saints' Church, South Leverton
- St Paul's Church, West Drayton
- St Peter and St Paul's Church, Sturton-le-Steeple
- St Martin's Church, Ranby
- St Bartholomew's Church, Sutton-cum-Lound

== See also ==
- Listed buildings in Bothamsall
