= St Swithun's Church, East Retford =

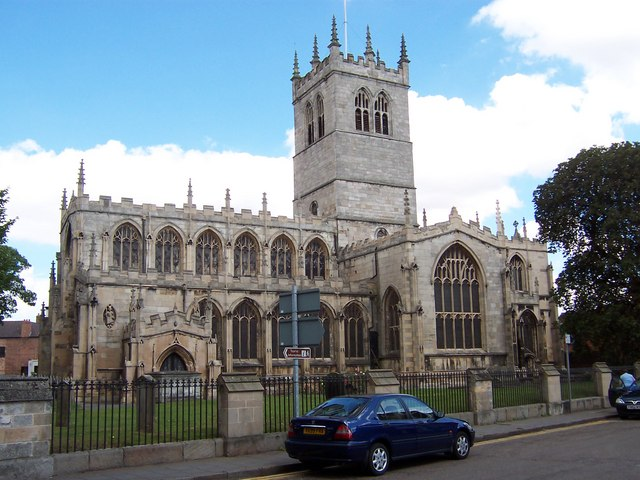
- St Swithun's Church, East Retford
- St Swithun's Church, East Retford
- 53°19′26.43″N 0°56′26.79″W
- Location: East Retford
- Country: England
- Denomination: Church of England

History
- Dedication: St Swithun

Architecture
- Heritage designation: Grade II* listed

Administration
- Province: York
- Diocese: Diocese of Southwell and Nottingham
- Archdeaconry: Newark
- Deanery: Bassetlaw and Bawtry
- Parish: Retford

Clergy
- Bishop(s): Bishop of Southwell & Nottingham and The Bishop of Sherwood
- Rector: Rev Canon Tony Walker
- Dean: Dean of Bassetlaw & Bawtry

St Swithun's Church is a Grade II* listed Church of England parish in the Diocese of Southwell and Nottingham in East Retford, Nottinghamshire, England.

== History ==
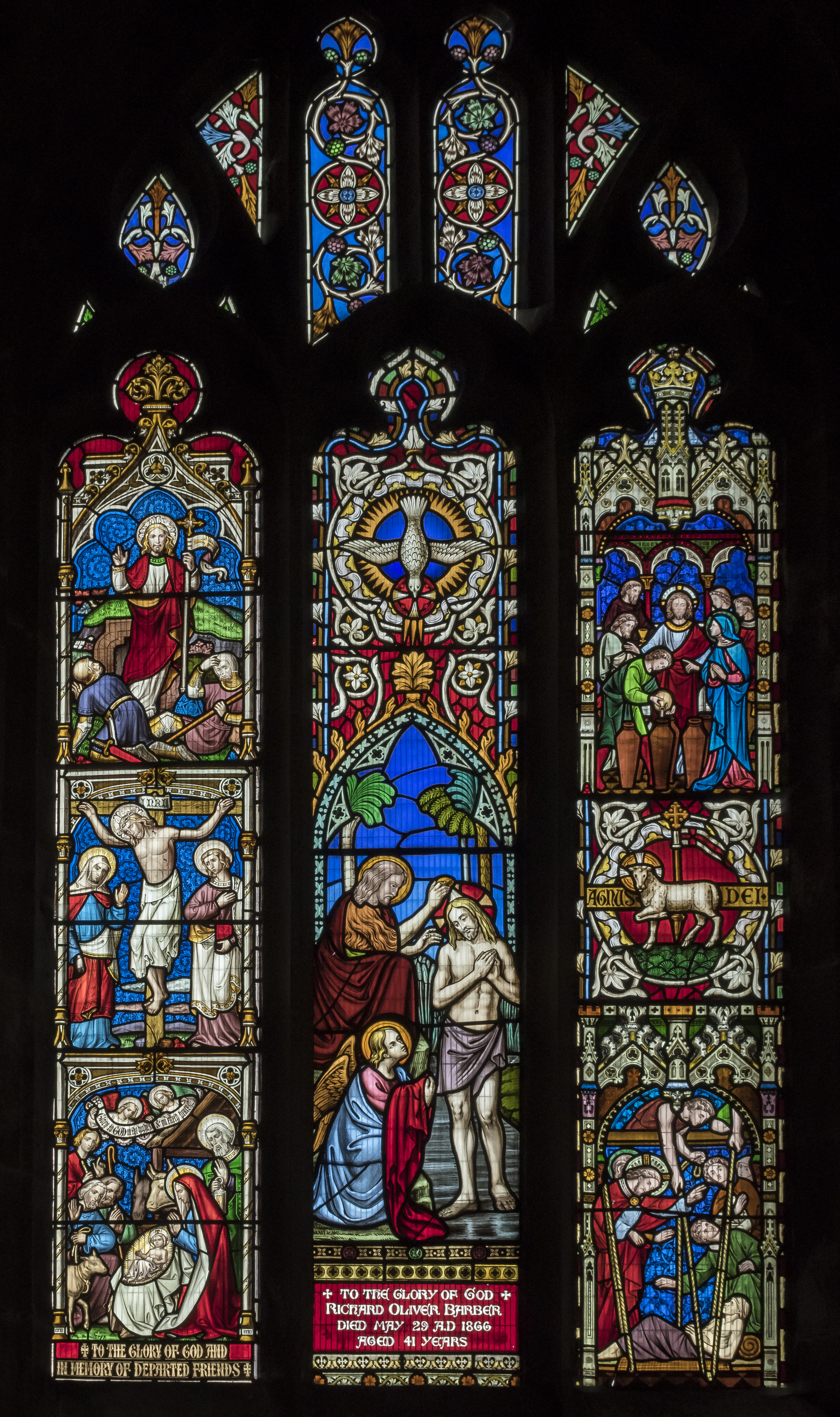
Stained glass window in St Swithun's, East Retford

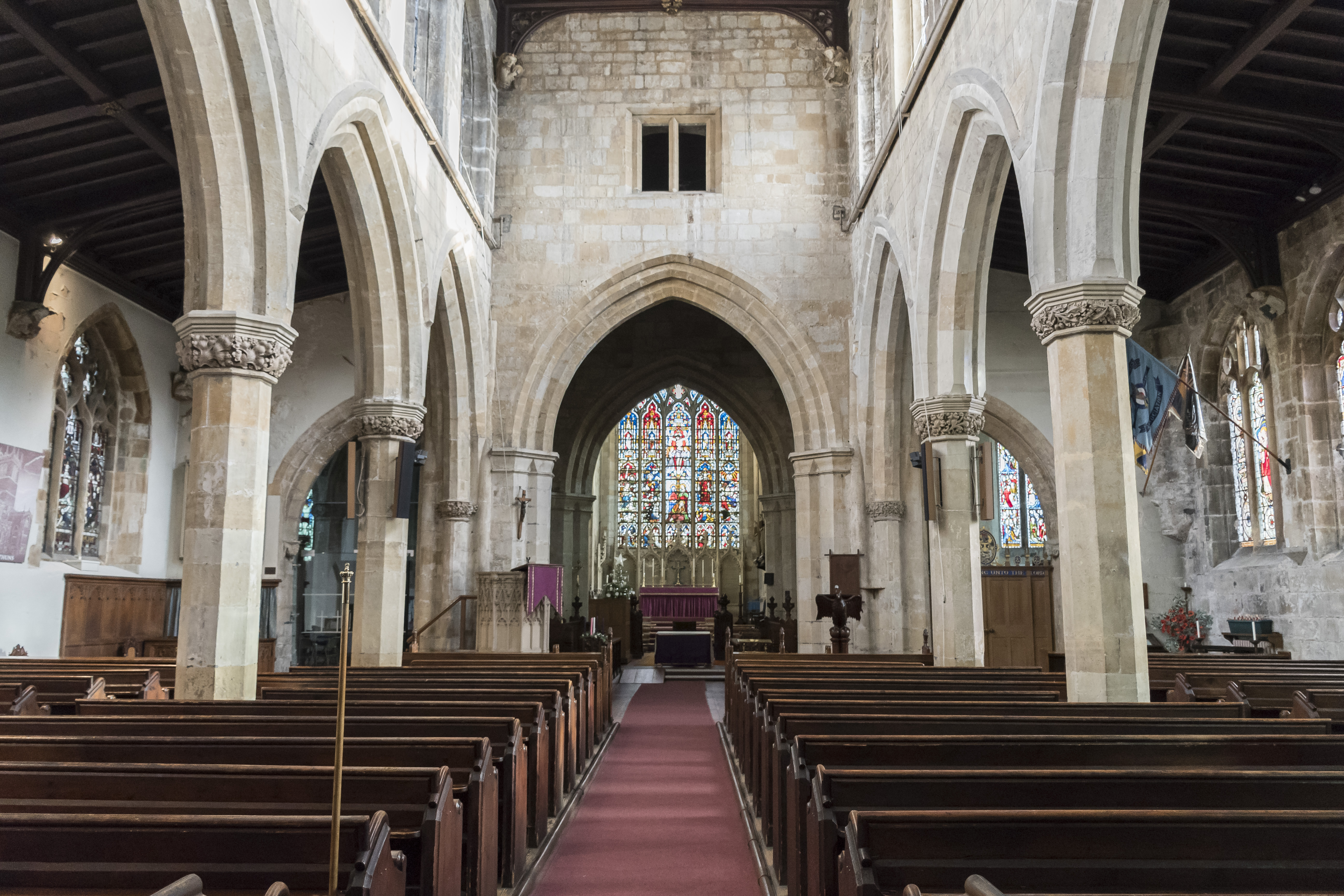
The nave and chancel

St Swithun's is a Grade II* listed church in Retford that is dedicated to St Swithun and which was founded in 1258. The church is located in the centre of town between Churchgate and Chapelgate.

The current building is of cruciform shape, now mainly of perpendicular architecture, but still preserving in its south and west doorways, and in the tracery of some of its windows, marks of earlier styles. The church has a square, battlemented tower, containing a clock and 10 bells. The oldest, virtually untouched, part is the north transept, although it has now been transformed into a chapel as a war memorial. The tower is supported by four massive arches and the nave and aisles are separated by arcades of five bays. There is a stone pulpit, an eagle lectern in oak, and a large organ erected in 1841. In the north transept is an incised slab to Henry Smyth (d 1496) and Sir Whatton Amcotts (d 1807) by William Kinnard, architect. The Victorian stained glass includes work by Clayton and Bell, Charles Eamer Kempe, Michael O’Connor, Hardman & Co, William Wailes and George Shaw.

The figure over the southern door is locally said to be of St Swithun, but according to Kidson is of a bishop. He says the figure was brought from a dissolved monastery in Portugal and was given to the church, and placed in its present position, in about 1895.

The British Museum contains several architectural drawings of East Retford Church by Samuel Hieronymous Grimm. These include a general view of the exterior, and a drawing of the tracery of the east window. There are also drawings by Thomas Kerrich (1748–1828) including a drawing of a window which used to be in the chancel, but which no longer exists. John Buckler (1770–1851) made several drawings of the church, including one of the figure in the vesica piscis, at the beginning of the nineteenth century.

While the church dates from the 13th century, in 1528 there was a great fire in Retford which damaged the church. In 1535, we learn that: "Where sumtyme were iiii chauntries which now er in decaye by reason they er consumed wt. fyer." The tower and chancel collapsed in 1651 and were rebuilt in 1658. The current building is therefore largely the work of restorers. The pinnacles were added to the tower in 1810. G.G. Place undertook further restorations between 1852 and 1855. The Chantry Chapel was rebuilt by George Frederick Bodley in 1873. There was a further restoration in 1905.

== Organ ==
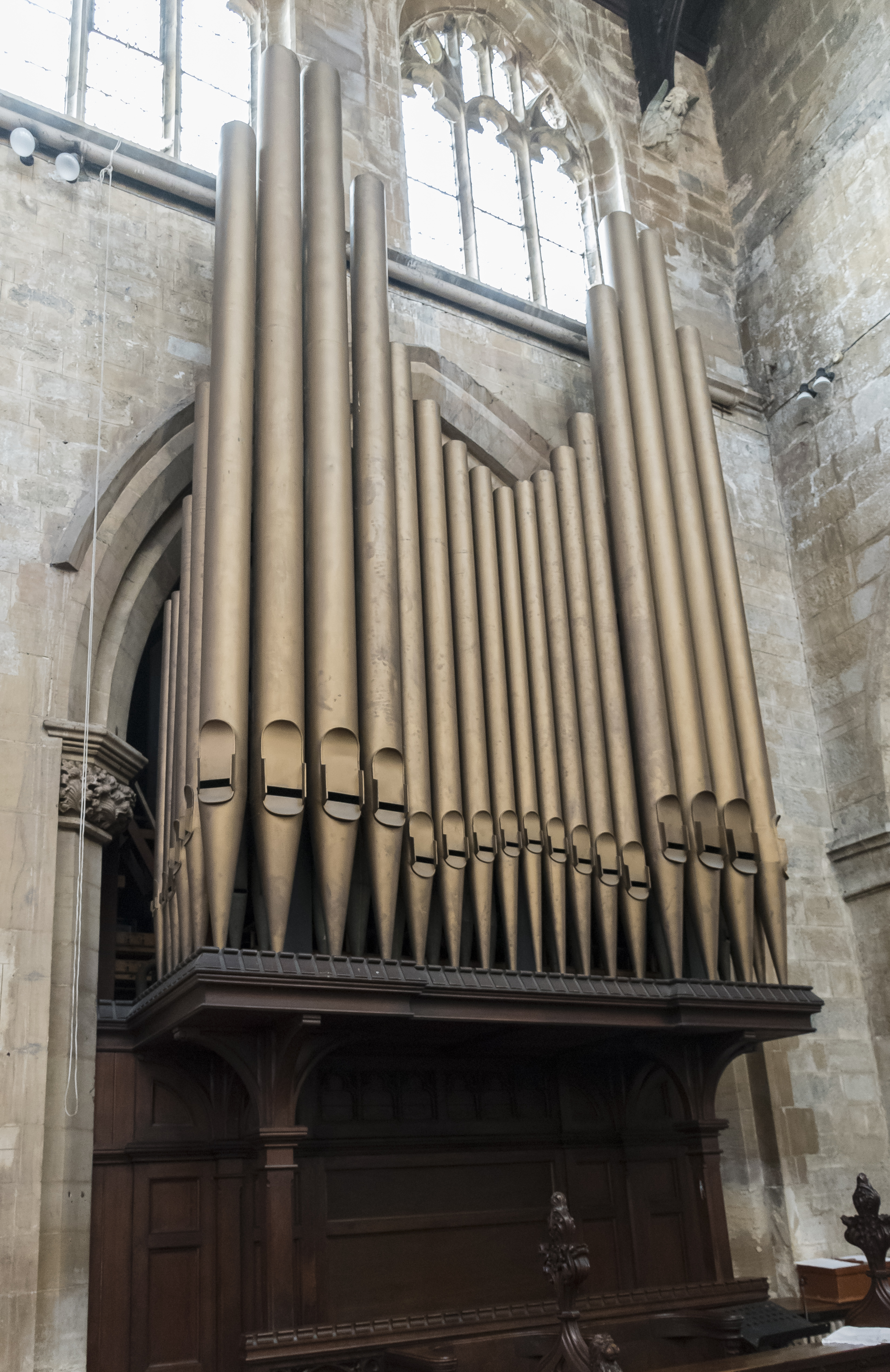
St Swithun's church organ

The first organ was erected in 1770 and came from the Theatre at Newark. It was presented by Robert Sutton, Esq. In 1787 an additional stop was introduced by Mr. Casterton, of Lincoln. In 1795 a new organ by Donaldson was purchased and the front of the old one taken to the church at West Retford. The Donaldson organ was replaced in 1841 by a larger one by Walker of London. This survived until 1886 when it was substantially enlarged by Brindley & Foster. There was then later work by Henry Willis & Sons and Cousans.

=== Organists ===
- W. Wilson 1770 – 1778
- B. Young 1778 – 1781
- I. Goodlad 1781 – 1791
- Dr. Edward Miller 1791 – 1797
- John Gildon 1797 – 1799
- T. Hand 1799 – 1807
- J. Birch 1807 – 1822
- J.E. Clarke 1822 – 1824
- H.T. Bugg from 1824
- George Dixon 1845 – 1858 (afterwards organist of St James' Church, Louth)
- Thomas Daffin ca. 1862
- Robert Nottingham 1863 – 1872
- Hamilton White 1872 – 1879 (formerly organist of Holy Trinity Church, Whitehaven afterwards organist at Worksop Priory)
- Arthur George Dixon 1880 - 1881
- William Nicholson 1881 - 1882
- F.W. Wells 1882 - 1891
- Herbert Compigne Andrews 1891 – 1914 (afterwards organist of St Nicholas Church, New Romney)
- Clifford Richmond 1914 – 1915 (formerly organist at St Mark's Church, Leeds)
- Roger William Soresby 1915 – 1922 (formerly organist at St Leodegarius Church, Basford)
- Harold Helman 1922 - 1929 (afterwards organist at All Saints Church, High Wycombe)
- George S. Alen 1929 – 1938
- Frank J. Ellis 1938 – (formerly organist of St Anne's Church, Worksop)
- Leslie Mason ca. 1955
- David Ashforth 1967 – 1984

== Bells ==
There are ten bells all cast by John Taylor & Co, dated 1968. The tenor weighs 23 cwt and is in the note of Eb.

== Parish ==
St Swithun's is in a joint parish with:

- St. Nicholas' Church, Askham
- All Saints' Church, Babworth
- St Martin's Church, Bole
- Our Lady and St Peter's Church, Bothamsall
- St John the Baptist Church, Clarborough
- All Saints' Church, Eaton
- St Giles' Church, Elkesley
- St Peter's Church, Gamston
- St. Helen's Church, Grove
- St Peter's Church, Hayton
- St Martin's Church, North Leverton
- St Peter and St Paul's Church, North Wheatley
- All Hallows' Church, Ordsall
- St Martin's Church, Ranby
- St Saviour's Church, Retford
- St Michael the Archangel's Church, Retford
- All Saints' Church, South Leverton
- St Peter and St Paul's Church, Sturton-le-Steeple
- St Bartholomew's Church, Sutton-cum-Lound
- St Paul's Church, West Drayton

== See also ==
- Grade II* listed buildings in Nottinghamshire
- Listed buildings in Retford
