= St Paul's Church, West Drayton =

St Paul’s Church, West Drayton
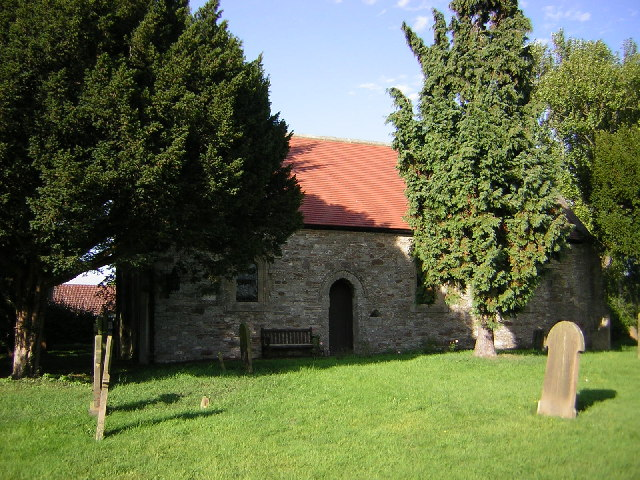
- St Paul’s Church, West Drayton
- St Paul’s Church, West Drayton
- 53°15′45.68″N 0°55′46.37″W
- OS grid reference: SK 71114 74747
- Location: West Drayton, Nottinghamshire
- Country: England
- Denomination: Church of England
- Website: www.achurchnearyou.com

History
- Dedication: St Paul

Architecture
- Heritage designation: Grade II* listed

Administration
- Province: York
- Diocese: Southwell and Nottingham
- Archdeaconry: Newark
- Deanery: Bassetlaw and Bawtry
- Parish: West Drayton

St Paul's Church is a Grade II* listed parish church in the Church of England in West Drayton, Nottinghamshire.

== History ==
The church dates from the 12th century.

It is in a joint benefice with

- St. Nicholas' Church, Askham
- All Saints' Church, Babworth
- St Martin's Church, Bole
- Our Lady and St Peter's Church, Bothamsall
- St John the Baptist Church, Clarborough
- All Saints' Church, Eaton
- St Giles' Church, Elkesley
- St Peter's Church, Gamston
- St. Helen's Church, Grove
- St Peter's Church, Hayton
- St Martin's Church, North Leverton
- St Peter and St Paul's Church, North Wheatley
- All Hallows' Church, Ordsall
- St Martin's Church, Ranby
- St Saviour's Church Retford
- St Swithun's Church, East Retford
- St Michael the Archangel's Church, Retford
- All Saints' Church, South Leverton
- St Peter and St Paul's Church, Sturton-le-Steeple
- St Bartholomew's Church, Sutton-cum-Lound

== Bells ==
West Drayton church has two bells that can be swing chimed.

== Group of Churches ==
This church is part of the Elkesley Group. This includes the parishes of:

- All Saints' and *St Peter, Eaton and Gamston
- St Giles, Elkesley
- St Paul, West Drayton
- Our Lady & St Peter, Bothamsall

== See also ==
- Grade II* listed buildings in Nottinghamshire
- Listed buildings in West Drayton, Nottinghamshire
