= All Saints' Church, South Leverton =

All Saints’ Church, South Leverton
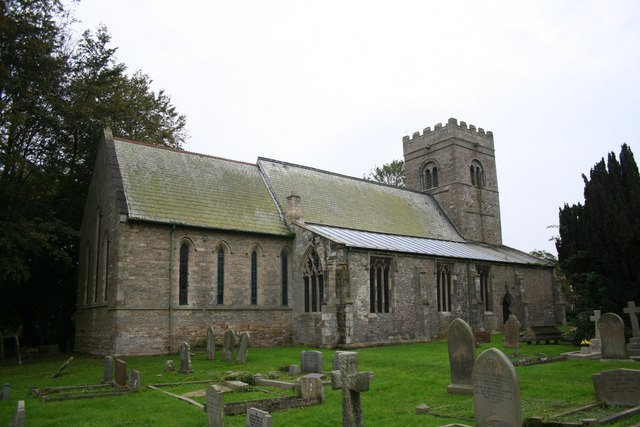
- All Saints’ Church, South Leverton
- All Saints’ Church, South Leverton
- 53°19′16″N 00°49′32″W
- OS grid reference: SK 78339 81106
- Location: South Leverton
- Country: England
- Denomination: Church of England

History
- Dedication: All Saints

Architecture
- Heritage designation: Grade II* listed

Administration
- Diocese: Southwell and Nottingham
- Archdeaconry: Newark
- Deanery: Bassetlaw and Bawtry
- Parish: South Leverton

All Saints’ Church, South Leverton is a Grade II* listed parish church in the Church of England in South Leverton, Nottinghamshire.

== History ==
The church dates from the 12th century. The chancel was restored by Ewan Christian in 1868; the remainder restored by C. Scholefield in 1897.

It is in a joint parish with

- St. Nicholas' Church, Askham
- All Saints' Church, Babworth
- St Martin's Church, Bole
- Our Lady and St Peter's Church, Bothamsall
- St John the Baptist Church, Clarborough
- All Saints' Church, Eaton
- St Giles' Church, Elkesley
- St Peter's Church, Gamston
- St. Helen's Church, Grove
- St Peter's Church, Hayton
- St Martin's Church, North Leverton
- St Peter and St Paul's Church, North Wheatley
- All Hallows' Church, Ordsall
- St Martin's Church, Ranby
- St Saviour's Church Retford
- St Swithun's Church, East Retford
- St Michael the Archangel's Church, Retford
- St Peter and St Paul's Church, Sturton-le-Steeple
- St Bartholomew's Church, Sutton-cum-Lound
- St Paul's Church, West Drayton

== See also ==
- Grade II* listed buildings in Nottinghamshire
- Listed buildings in South Leverton
