= St Peter's Church, Gamston =

St Peter’s Church, Gamston
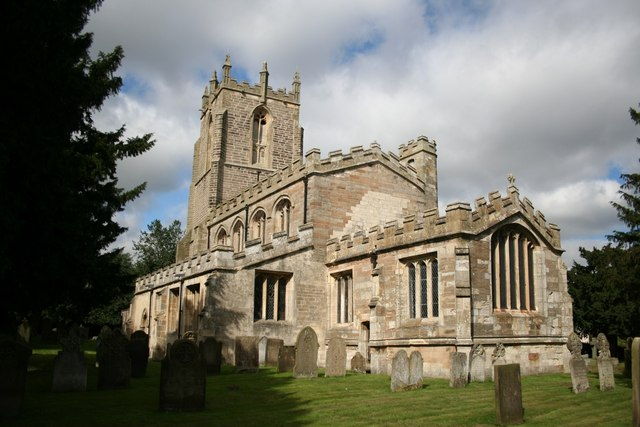
- St Peter’s Church, Gamston
- St Peter’s Church, Gamston
- 53°16′35.81″N 0°56′19.13″W
- OS grid reference: SK 70874 76022
- Location: Gamston, Bassetlaw
- Country: England
- Denomination: Church of England

History
- Dedication: St Peter

Architecture
- Heritage designation: Grade I listed

Administration
- Diocese: Southwell and Nottingham
- Archdeaconry: Newark
- Deanery: Bassetlaw and Bawtry
- Parish: Eaton & Gamston

St Peter's Church, Gamston is a Grade I listed redundant parish church in the Church of England in Gamston, Bassetlaw.

== History ==
The church dates from the 13th century. It was restored by Sir George Gilbert Scott in 1855. It closed in 2015, and was vested in the Churches Conservation Trust in 2018.

It was in a joint benefice with

- St. Nicholas' Church, Askham
- All Saints' Church, Babworth
- St Martin's Church, Bole
- Our Lady and St Peter's Church, Bothamsall
- St John the Baptist Church, Clarborough
- All Saints' Church, Eaton
- St Giles' Church, Elkesley
- St. Helen's Church, Grove
- St Peter's Church, Hayton
- St Martin's Church, North Leverton
- St Peter and St Paul's Church, North Wheatley
- All Hallows' Church, Ordsall
- St Martin's Church, Ranby
- St Saviour's Church Retford
- St Swithun's Church, East Retford
- St Michael the Archangel's Church, Retford
- All Saints' Church, South Leverton
- St Peter and St Paul's Church, Sturton-le-Steeple
- St Bartholomew's Church, Sutton-cum-Lound
- St Paul's Church, West Drayton

== Organ ==
The church has a two manual pipe organ installed in 1964. A specification of the organ can be found on the National Pipe Organ Register.
