= Listed buildings in Retford =

Retford is a market town in the Bassetlaw District of Nottinghamshire, England. The town contains 129 listed buildings that are recorded in the National Heritage List for England. Of these, six are at Grade II*, the middle of the three grades, and the others are at Grade II, the lowest grade. Most of the listed buildings are houses, cottages and associated structures, shops, banks and offices, public buildings, churches, chapels and associated structures, public houses and hotels, schools and associated structures. The other listed buildings include an ancient stone, two groups of almshouses, a museum, a mill, a cannon, a railway station, a canal crane, two war memorials and a cinema.

== Key ==
Grade	Criteria
II*	Particularly important buildings of more than special interest
II	Buildings of national importance and special interest

== Buildings ==
Name and location	Photograph	Date	Notes	Grade
St Swithun's Church; 53.32416°N 0.94079°W		13th century	The church has been altered and extended through the centuries, particularly in 1854–55 by G. G Place, and in 1873 by G. F. Bodley. It is built in stone and has a cruciform plan, consisting of a nave with a clerestory, north and south aisles, a south porch, north and south transepts, a chancel, and a tower at the crossing. The tower has four stages, it contains two-light bell openings, and has an embattled parapet with eight pinnacles. The body of the church also has embattled parapets, and most of the windows have Perpendicular tracery.	II*
The Broad Stone; 53.32253°N 0.94302°W		Medieval	This consists of a plinth supporting a stone bowl, its original purpose being uncertain. It was restored in 1887, and has an inscription relating to this.	II
St Michael the Archangel's Church; 53.32413°N 0.94707°W		14th century	The original parts of the church are in Perpendicular style, the north aisle was added in 1863–64 by James Fowler, and the chancel was extended in 1889–90. The church is built in limestone with roofs of tile and lead, and consists of a nave, north and south aisles, north and south porches, a north transeptal organ chamber, a chancel, and a west steeple. The steeple has a tower with diagonal buttresses, a three-light west window and two-light bell openings. At the top is an embattled parapet with crocketed pinnacles, and the broach of the spire starts below the parapet. The spire is crocketed and has small flying buttresses, a second set of pinnacles, and one tier of lucarnes.	II*
Ye Olde Sun Inn; 53.32373°N 0.94124°W		16th century (probable)	The public house has a timber framed core, the exterior is stuccoed, it has a pantile roof, and there are two low storeys. The doorway is recessed, the windows are modern casements, and the carriage entry to the left has been partly blocked and a doorway inserted.	II
West Retford Hall; 53.32280°N 0.94851°W		1699	A house that has been much altered, it is in red brick with angle pilasters, and a tall stone coped parapet with an added stucco cornice. There are two storeys and nine bays, the middle three bays projecting slightly. On the front is a rectangular stone porch and a doorway with a fanlight, and the windows are hung sashes. At the rear is a full height bow window.	II
4 Chapelgate; 53.32366°N 0.94188°W	—	Early 18th century	The building is in rendered brick, with an eaves cornice and a pantile roof. There are three storeys and six bays, The main door in the centre is recessed, and has a pulvinated frieze and a dentilled cornice. It is flanked by modern windows, with a smaller recessed doorway on the left, and a yard entry on the right. In the upper floors are sash windows.	II
43 Moorgate; 53.32621°N 0.93942°W	—	Early 18th century (probable)	The house, which has been modernised, is rendered, on a plinth, with a wooden cornice on paired modillions, and a hipped pantile roof. There are two storeys and three bays. The central doorway has a plain surround, and the windows are a mix of sashes and modern replacements.	II
18 and 18A The Square; 53.32248°N 0.94373°W		Early 18th century	A range of buildings in red brick, with a moulded eaves cornice and a pantile roof. There are two storeys and seven bays. In the middle bay is a segmental arch with impost blocks and a keystone, above which is a sash window with a keystone, and a pediment with a blind lunette in the tympanum. In the bay to the right is a projecting stone porch with Doric columns, a dentilled frieze and a moulded cornice, and elsewhere in the ground floor are shop fronts. The upper floor contains sash windows with keystones, those in the right three bays with semicircular iron balconies.	II
Denman Public Library; 53.32419°N 0.94174°W	—	Early 18th century	Originally a house, it was altered in the early 19th century, and converted into a public library in 1927. The building is in red brick with end pilasters, an eaves cornice, and a hipped pantile roof. The main block has two storeys and five bays, there is a single-storey extension towards the road, and the entrance is in a passage on the left side. In the angle is a porch, arched on two sides, to its left is a large window, above which is a cast iron balcony, and a Venetian window. The windows on the front of the original house are hung sashes with keystones, and in the roof are two gabled dormers.	II
6, 6A, 8 and 10 Bridgegate; 53.32358°N 0.94319°W		18th century	A row of three shops in red brick with a dentilled eaves cornice and a Welsh slate roof. There are three storeys and six bays. In the ground floor is a segmental-arched carriage entry and three modern shop fronts. The upper floors contain sash windows, most with segmental-arched heads.	II
2 Carolgate and 12 The Square; 53.32248°N 0.94251°W		18th century	A shop on a corner site in chequered brick with a dentilled eaves cornice and a Welsh slate roof, hipped on the corner. There are three storeys, four bays on Carolgate and three on The Square. In the ground floor is a modern shop front, and the upper floors contain sash windows with brick voussoirs and keystones.	II
22 and 24 Carolgate and 2 Coronation Street; 53.32148°N 0.94242°W		Mid 18th century	A house, later a row of three shops, on a corner site, in brick with a moulded eaves cornice. There are three storeys, a front of five bays, the middle bay projecting under a pediment, and a two-storey five-bay extension at the rear. On the front are projecting 19th-century shop fronts, and the upper floors contain hung sash windows with keystones and brick voussoirs. In the left return are a doorway with a pediment and two shop fronts.	II
2, 4 and 4A Churchgate; 53.32441°N 0.94098°W	—	18th century	The building, which was extended in the 19th century, is rendered, and has a sill band, a dentilled eaves cornice, and a roof of tile at the front and pantile at the rear. There are three storeys, a double pile plan, and the extension has a moulded gable end and a parapet. The ground floor has a modern front and entrance, and the windows are a mix of sashes and casements, one with a segmental head.	II
15 Churchgate; 53.32405°N 0.94178°W	—	18th century	A house that was altered in the 19th century, it is rendered, on a stone plinth, and has a sill band, paired eaves brackets and a Welsh slate roof. There are three storeys and three bays. In the left bay is a doorway with a moulded surround, a rectangular fanlight and a pediment. The windows are sashes with moulded surrounds, those in the upper two floors with iron guards, and those in the ground floor with cornices.	II
33 Churchgate; 53.32447°N 0.94126°W	—	18th century	The building is in brick on a stone plinth, with floor bands, a wooden moulded eaves cornice and a tile roof. There are three storeys and a front of four bays, one bay on the left return, and a rear extension of two storeys and three bays. The right bay on the front has a segmental-arched carriage entry, and the windows are sashes.	II
24 Moorgate; 53.32561°N 0.93961°W	—	18th century	A farmhouse that has been converted for other uses, it is in red brick, with a brick floor band and a pantile roof. There are two storeys, four bays, and a rear wing. The doorway has pilasters, an entablature, a three-light fanlight, and a cornice, and to the left is a carriage entrance. The windows are sashes with brick voussoirs.	II
20 Grove Street; 53.32257°N 0.94126°W	—	18th century	A shop in red brick with a brick floor band, a dentilled eaves cornice and a pantile roof. There are three storeys and four bays. In the ground floor is a 19th-century shop front and a segmental-headed carriage entry with brick voussoirs to the right. In the middle floor of the left bay is a segmental bow window, and the other windows are sashes.	II
7 and 8 Market Place; 53.32308°N 0.94237°W		Mid 18th century	A pair of shops in painted brick, with a sill band, a modillion eaves cornice and a slate roof. There are three storeys and five bays. In the ground floor are modern shop fronts, and the upper floors contain sash windows with segmental-arched heads.	II
11 Market Place; 53.32279°N 0.94237°W		Mid 18th century	A bank on a corner site, in red brick, with a floor band, a dentilled eaves cornice and a pantile roof. There are three storeys, three bays on Market Place and two on Grove Street. In the ground floor is a modern bank front, and the upper floors contain sash windows on Market Place, and blocked windows on Grove Street.	II
30 Market Place; 53.32351°N 0.94283°W	—	18th century	A rendered shop on a corner, with a brick dentilled and diagonally-set cornice and a Welsh slate roof. There are three storeys and two bays. In the ground floor is a shop front, and the upper floors contain sash windows.	II
39 and 41 Moorgate; 53.32611°N 0.93952°W	—	Mid 18th century	A pair of houses in painted brick with end pilasters, floor bands, a tall capped unpainted parapet, and a pantile roof. There are two storeys and five bays, the middle bay slightly projecting. In the middle bay is a round-arched recessed doorway with an architrave and a traceried fanlight, and the right bay contains a flat-headed doorway with a moulded surround. The windows are sashes, and in the parapet are four recessed panels and a central blind lunette.	II
53 Moorgate; 53.32668°N 0.93892°W	—	18th century	A house in red brick with a stone plinth on the right, a dentilled eaves cornice, and a Welsh slate roof with stone coped gables and kneelers. There are three storeys and three bays. The central doorway has attached columns, a semicircular fanlight, a frieze and a cornice. The windows are hung sashes with brick voussoirs and keystones, those in the ground floor with moulded surrounds and cornices.	II
21 The Square; 53.32287°N 0.94378°W		18th century	The building is stuccoed, and has a sill band, a modillion eaves cornice, and a hipped Welsh slate roof. There are three storeys and five bays. In the ground floor is a later stone bank front, the doorway in the left bay with a pediment, above which is a balustraded balcony with urns. The upper floors contain sash windows with shouldered surrounds, those in the middle floor with cornices.	II
23 and 24 The Square; 53.32308°N 0.94355°W		Mid 18th century	A pair of mirror-image buildings in red brick, with a rusticated stone ground floor over which is a moulded cornice, and rusticated pilasters at the ends and between the bays. At the top is a moulded cornice, a small parapet and a Welsh slate roof. There are four storeys and three bays, the middle bay projecting slightly under a pediment. In the centre are paired round-arched doorways with semicircular radiating fanlights, flanked by three-light windows. The upper floors contain windows with shouldered and shaped stuccoed surrounds, those in the first floor tripartite.	II
Building between 24 and 25 The Square; 53.32309°N 0.94337°W		Mid 18th century	The building is in red brick, the ground floor rendered, and it has a pantile roof. There are three storeys and two bays. In the ground floor are a doorway and a flat-headed carriage entry, the middle floor contains bow windows with cornices, and in the top floor are modern windows.	II
25 The Square; 53.32309°N 0.94328°W		Mid 18th century	The building is in chequered brick with sill bands, a modillion eaves cornice and a pantile roof, hipped on the left. There are four storeys and an attic, and two bays. In the ground floor is a shop front with an arcaded window, the upper floors contain sash windows in moulded surrounds, and in the roof is a dormer.	II
Amcott House; 53.32227°N 0.93956°W		Mid 18th century	A house, later Bassetlaw Museum, it is in red brick with stone dressings, a floor band, and a Welsh slate roof with stone coped gables and kneelers. There are two storeys, a double pile plan, and five bays, the middle bay wider and slightly projecting under an open pediment. Steps lead up to the central round-headed doorway that has a semicircular fanlight and side lights, above which is a cornice and an open pediment. In the upper floor is a Venetian window, and the other windows are sashes with brick voussoirs.	II*
Bolham Hall; 53.33931°N 0.93880°W	—	Mid 18th century	A house, later divided, in red brick with stone dressings, floor bands, a modillion cornice, and a pantile roof with coped gables. There are three storeys, a double pile plan, and a symmetrical east front with five bays. In the centre is a doorway that has a traceried fanlight and a shallow pediment. The windows in the lower two floors are sashes with keystones, and in the top floor they are casements.	II
Vine Inn; 53.32400°N 0.94188°W	—	18th century	The public house is in red brick on a plinth, with an eaves cornice and a Welsh slate roof. There are three storeys and four bays. In the ground floor is a segmental-arched carriage entry, with modern windows to the right. The upper floors contain sash windows with brick voussoirs.	II
Former stables, West Retford Hall; 53.32298°N 0.94813°W		18th century	The stable block is in brick with roofs of Welsh slate and pantile, and there are two storeys. On one side are doorways, and windows, some with segmental heads, and some with Gothic glazing bars, and a round-arched passage entry. On the other side are two carriage entries.	II
Former White Hart Hotel; 53.32342°N 0.94306°W		18th century	The hotel, on a corner site, is in red brick on a plinth, with sill bands, and an eaves cornice. There are three storeys, six bays on Bridgegate, and three on Market Place. In the right bay is an elliptical-headed carriage entrance. On the Market Street front is a doorway with a moulded surround and a rectangular fanlight, and the windows are sashes.	II
Former Yorkshire Bank; 53.32312°N 0.94303°W		Mid 18th century	A building on a corner site, at one time a bank, in chequered brick, with sill bands, a modillion eaves cornice, and a slate roof, hipped on the corner. There are four storeys, five bays on the front, and three on the right return. In the ground floor are modern shop fronts and windows, and the upper floors contain hung sash windows.	II
West Retford House; 53.32603°N 0.94986°W		1762	A large house, later a hotel, in red brick with floor bands and a hipped tile roof. There are three storeys, a main block of five bays, and flanking two-storey two-bay wings. In the centre is a porch with quoins and a cornice, and a doorway with a moulded surround, a round-headed fanlight, and a pediment on brackets. The windows are sashes with keystones, those in the ground floor with round-arched heads.	II
2 and 4 Bridgegate; 53.32352°N 0.94301°W	—	Late 18th century	A pair of shops with three storeys and a pantile roof. No. 2 is rough rendered, and has a diagonally-set eaves cornice, and two bays. In the ground floor is a 19th-century shop front, the middle floor contains two sash windows and in the top floor are two modern windows. No. 4 is rendered and has a single bay, a modern shop front, a canted bay window in the middle floor, and the top floor contains a window with a moulded surround.	II
24 Chapelgate; 53.32379°N 0.94067°W	—	Late 18th century	A shop in red brick with a pantile roof, three storeys and three bays. In the ground floor is a modern shop front, to the right is a doorway with a rectangular fanlight, and a segmental-arched carriage entry, both with brick voussoirs. The upper floors contain sash windows.	II
1 Churchgate; 53.32371°N 0.94245°W	—	Late 18th century	A shop in red brick with a floor band, and a tall stone coped parapet. There are three storeys and an attic, and two bays. In the ground floor is a mid-late 19th-century shop front, and the upper floors contain windows with brick voussoirs.	II
6–10 Churchgate; 53.32454°N 0.94083°W		Late 18th century	A row of three shops in painted brick with a wooden eaves cornice and a pantile roof. There are two storeys and four bays. In the ground floor are shop fronts with pilasters, and the upper floor contains windows, mainly sashes.	II
10 Grove Street; 53.32259°N 0.94180°W	—	Late 18th century	A shop in chequered brick with a wooden eaves cornice, a pantile roof, and three storeys. In the ground floor is a modern shop front, and the middle floor contains two canted bay windows, between which is a blocked window with a segmental head. In the top floor are four sash windows.	II
12 Grove Street; 53.32259°N 0.94171°W	—	Late 18th century	A shop in chequered brick with a pantile roof, three storeys and two bays. In the ground floor is a 19th-century shop front and a passage entry to the right. The upper floors contain sash windows with segmental heads.	II
13–17 Grove Street; 53.32276°N 0.94140°W		Late 18th century	A block of three shops in red brick, the right shop painted, with a sill band, an eaves cornice and a pantile roof. There are three storeys and four bays. In the ground floor are 19th and 20th-century shop fronts, and a round-headed passage entry with impost blocks and a fluted keystone. In the middle floor of the right bay is a canted bay window, and the other windows are sashes with wedge lintels and fluted keystones.	II
25 Grove Street; 53.32279°N 0.94073°W	—	Late 18th century	A red brick house with a stuccoed moulded eaves cornice and a slate roof. There are three storeys and five bays. The central round-arched doorway has panelled pilasters, a stuccoed moulded surround, a fanlight, a keystone, and an open pediment. The windows are sashes with stuccoed keystones and sills., At the entrance to the front garden are rusticated gateposts with ball finials.	II*
27 Grove Street; 53.32269°N 0.94052°W	—	Late 18th century	The house is in red brick with a pantile roof, three storeys and two bays. In the ground floor is a round-arched doorway with fluted pilasters, a fanlight, and a cornice, and to the right is a canted bay window. The upper floors contain sash windows with brick voussoirs.	II
9 Market Place; 53.32298°N 0.94236°W		Late 18th century	A shop in red brick with stone dressings and a moulded eaves cornice. There are three storeys and three bays. The ground floor contains a modern shop front, and in the upper floors are windows with moulded surrounds.	II
10A and 10 Market Place; 53.32288°N 0.94233°W		Late 18th century	A pair of shops in red brick with a slate roof, three storeys and four bays. In the ground floor are modern shop fronts. The upper floors contain sash windows, in the middle floor with moulded surrounds and segmental brick arches, and in the top floor with wedge lintels and keystones.	II
37 Moorgate; 53.32595°N 0.93965°W	—	Late 18th century	A house in red brick with floor bands, a moulded wooden eaves cornice, and a pantile roof. There are three storeys and four bays. The doorway in the third bay has engaged columns and a pediment, and is flanked by canted bay windows. In the left bay is a round-headed passage entry and the windows are sashes.	II
55 and 57 Moorgate; 53.32679°N 0.93881°W	—	Late 18th century (possible)	A house with a former public house to the right, the building is in painted brick with bracketed eaves and a pantile roof. There are two storeys, the house has one bay and the public house has two. On the front are two doorways with rectangular fanlights and pediments. The windows in the right two bays have segmental heads, and there are two roof dormers.	II
Bramble House and Westfields; 53.30597°N 0.93204°W	—	Late 18th century	A detached house in painted brick, with a sill band, and a dentilled cornice. There are three storeys, three bays, the middle bay projecting slightly under a dentilled pediment, and later additions to the sides. The central round-arched doorway has fluted pilasters, a traceried fanlight and an open dentilled pediment. The windows are sashes with keystones.	II
Chapelgate House; 53.32391°N 0.93956°W	—	Late 18th century	A house in red brick with a dentilled eaves cornice and a pantile roof. There are three storeys and four bays. In the second bay is a doorway with a moulded surround and a cornice, and the windows are sashes with segmental heads.	II
Church House; 53.32381°N 0.94051°W	—	Late 18th century	A house and a shop in red brick with a floor band, a dentilled eaves cornice and a pantile roof. There are two storeys and six bays. The shop on the left has a shop window, and a doorway and a carriage entry, both with segmental heads. In the left bay of the house is a doorway with pilasters, a blocked rectangular fanlight, a frieze and a cornice, and elsewhere there are hung sash windows with segmental heads.	II
Moorgate House; 53.33426°N 0.93505°W	—	Late 18th century	A house in red brick with a slate roof, three storeys and three bays. In the centre is a porch with a swept roof, this is flanked by canted bay windows, and the upper floors contain hung sash windows. To the right is a single-storey single-bay extension with a shaped gable and a ball finial.	II
Former Barn, West Retford Hall; 53.32344°N 0.94786°W		Late 18th century	The barn, later converted for residential use, is in red brick with a dentilled eaves cornice and a pantile roof. There are two storeys, and it contains two windows and a segmental cart entry. To the east is a single-storey extension with a stable door.	II
Stabling and wall, West Retford House; 53.32568°N 0.95012°W		Late 18th century	The stable block and wall are in red brick. The stable has a stuccoed cornice and a pantile roof. On the front facing the road is an arcade of six arches containing blind lunettes with keystones. The wall has stone coping and is ramped.	II
Whitehouse Inn; 53.30680°N 0.93161°W		Late 18th century	The public house is in painted brick with sill bands, a double dentilled eaves cornice and a pantile roof. There are three storeys and three bays. In the centre is a doorway with a moulded surround, to its left is a bow window, and the other windows have flat heads and keystones.	II
Gate piers and railings, Babworth Park; 53.31946°N 0.96078°W		c. 1790	The gate piers and railings at the entrance to the drive were designed by Humphry Repton. The gate piers are in rusticated stone on a moulded base, with a moulded band and shaped coping. These are flanked by sloping wrought iron railings and single similar smaller piers.	II
43 Bridgegate; 53.32464°N 0.94779°W		Late 18th or early 19th century	A roughcast house with a dentilled eaves cornice and a Welsh slate roof. There are three storeys and six bays. Four steps with handrails lead up to a doorway in the second bay that has pilasters, a rectangular fanlight and a pediment. This is flanked by canted bay windows, at the right end is a round-arched passage entry, and the other windows are hung sashes.	II
31 Carolgate; 53.32156°N 0.94210°W	—	Late 18th or early 19th century	A house in red brick with floor bands, a wooden eaves cornice and a pantile roof. There are three storeys and three bays. In the left bay is a projecting rusticated stone porch with a cornice, and the windows have flat heads with brick voussoirs.	II
5 and 7 Grove Street; 53.32277°N 0.94180°W	—	Late 18th or early 19th century	A pair of mirror-image houses in red brick on a plinth, with a moulded wooden eaves cornice and a Welsh slate roof. There are three storeys and five bays. In the centre are three doorways with steps and foot scrapers. The central passage doorway has a moulded surround, a cast iron fanlight and a flat hood, and each of the outer doorways has reeded and fluted pilasters, a traceried fanlight, a plain frieze, paterae, and a cornice. Above the doorways is a decorative wrought iron balcony on brackets. In the outer bays are shallow bow windows with a cornice, and the top floor contains sash windows, the middle window blocked.	II
35 Grove Street; 53.32263°N 0.94012°W	—	Late 18th or early 19th century	A shop in red brick, the ground floor rendered, with a sill band and a pantile roof. There are three storeys and three bays. In the ground floor is a modern shop front, and the upper floors contain windows with brick voussoirs.	II
29 Market Place; 53.32333°N 0.94303°W	—	Late 18th or early 19th century	A shop in red brick, with a sill band, a dentilled eaves cornice, and a Welsh slate roof with an iron ridge. There are three storeys and three bays. In the ground floor is a modern shop front, and the upper floors contain windows with keystones.	II
35 Moorgate; 53.32587°N 0.93973°W	—	Late 18th or early 19th century	A shop in rendered brick, with two storeys, a single bay, and the gable end facing the street. In the ground floor is a 19th-century shop front with pilasters and a cornice, to the right is a doorway with pilasters, a cornice and an entablature, and the upper floor contains a casement window.	II
Swiss Cottages, Babworth Park; 53.31961°N 0.96472°W	—	Late 18th or early 19th century	Originally two houses, later combined into one, it is in red brick with uncut timber cladding simulating a log cabin, and has a slate roof with deep overhanging eaves. There is a single storey and attics, and three bays. The left gable has bargeboards, a projecting roof, and a balcony on three wooden posts. Most of the windows are casements.	II
Sloswick's Hospital Almshouses; 53.32442°N 0.94157°W		1806	A block of almshouses in red brick, with a modillion cornice and a slate roof. There are two storeys and five bays, the middle three bays projecting slightly under an open pediment containing an inscribed oval plaque in the tympanum. The openings on the front have pointed arches, the doorway with a fanlight, and the windows with intersecting tracery.	II*
22 The Square, and garden wall with archway 53.32307°N 0.94377°W	—	c. 1811	A house, later a shop, in red brick with an eaves cornice on paired modillions, and a slate roof. There are three storeys and four bays. In the ground floor is a modern shop front, the doorway with a dentilled cornice and a pediment. On the west front is a doorway with Greek Ionic columns, a dentilled cornice and an open pediment, and at the rear the garden is enclosed by a wall containing an archway with a doorway.	II
11 and 13 Bridgegate; 53.32360°N 0.94372°W	—	Early 19th century	A pair of shops in red brick with a wide wooden eaves cornice, three storeys, and five bays. In the centre is a segmental-arched carriage entry, flanked by shop fronts. The upper floors contain hung sash windows with brick voussoirs.	II
16 Bridgegate; 53.32371°N 0.94359°W	—	Early 19th century	A shop in red brick with bracketed eaves, three storeys and three bays. In the ground floor is a shop front with pilasters, a fascia and a cornice, and to its right is a round-arched passage entry. The upper floors contain hung sash windows with brick voussoirs.	II
17 Carolgate; 53.32203°N 0.94230°W	—	Early 19th century	A shop in red brick with a diagonally-set and dentilled eaves cornice and a Welsh slate roof. There are two storeys and three bays. In the ground floor is a shop front, and the upper floor contains segmental-headed sash windows.	II
28–32 Carolgate; 53.32127°N 0.94238°W	—	Early 19th century	A row of rendered shops with a sill band and a Welsh slate roof. There are three storeys and six bays. In the ground floor are projecting 19h-century and modern shop fronts. The upper floors contain casement windows, with recessed panels between the floors.	II
41 Carolgate; 53.32127°N 0.94196°W	—	Early 19th century	The shop is in red brick with an eaves cornice and a Welsh slate roof. There are two storeys and three bays. In the ground floor is a modern shop front, and the upper floor contains sash window with brick voussoirs.	II
77 Carolgate; 53.32009°N 0.94151°W		Early 19th century	A shop on a corner site in red brick, with a dentilled eaves cornice and a pantile roof. There are three storeys, three bays on New Street, and one on Carolgate. In the left bay on New Street is a shop front, and to its right is a doorway with a moulded surround, a rectangular fanlight and a keystone. The Carolgate front contains a shop front with plain pilasters. The windows in both fronts are sashes with moulded surrounds and keystones.	II
79 Carolgate; 53.32002°N 0.94152°W		Early 19th century	A shop in red brick with an eaves cornice and a pantile roof. There are two storeys and three bays. In the ground floor is a modern shop front and a round-arched entry to the left, and the upper floor contains sash windows.	II
2 Chapelgate; 53.32364°N 0.94208°W	—	Early 19th century	A shop in red brick with paired eaves brackets, three storeys and four bays. In the ground floor is a 19th-century shop front with two windows, and a doorway to the right with a cornice, all with pilasters. The upper floors contain hung sash windows with brick voussoirs.	II
6–12 Chapelgate; 53.32373°N 0.94154°W	—	Early 19th century	A row of four shops in red brick, with three storeys and eight bays. In the ground floor are a 19th-century shop front, two modern shop fronts, and four round-arched doorways. The window in the left bay, and those in the upper floors, are sashes with rusticated lintels and keystones.	II
40 Chapelgate; 53.32390°N 0.93974°W	—	Early 19th century	The house is in red brick with an eaves cornice and a hipped pantile roof. There are two storeys and three bays, and flanking single-storey single-bay wings. Three steps lead up to the central round-headed doorway that has impost blocks, a radiating fanlight and a keystone. To its left is a round-headed window, to the right is a canted bay window, and in the left wing is a window in a round-headed recess. The windows are hung sashes with stuccoed keystones.	II
3 Churchgate; 53.32376°N 0.94239°W	—	Early 19th century	A shop in painted brick, with an eaves cornice on paired brackets and a Welsh slate roof. There are three storeys and four bays. In the ground floor is a modern shop front, and the upper floors contain windows with brick voussoirs.	II
5 Churchgate; 53.32381°N 0.94229°W	—	Early 19th century	A shop in red brick with a wooden eaves cornice on brackets and a Welsh slate roof. There are three storeys and four bays. In the left bay of the ground floor is a carriage entry, and to its right is a 19th-century shop front. The upper floors contain hung sash windows with rendered rusticated wedge lintels, keystones and cornices.	II
7 Churchgate; 53.32385°N 0.94216°W	—	Early 19th century	A rendered shop with a Welsh slate roof. There are three storeys and three bays. In the left bay of the ground floor is a carriage entry, and to its right is a late 19th-century shop front with arcaded glazing. The upper floors contain hung sash windows, the middle window in the top floor blind.	II
9 and 11 Churchgate; 53.32393°N 0.94202°W	—	Early 19th century	A pair of shops in red brick with a Welsh slate roof. There are three storeys and six bays. In the centre of the ground floor is a carriage entry, flanked by late 19th-century shop fronts. The upper floors contain hung sash windows with brick voussoirs.	II
45 Churchgate; 53.32477°N 0.94099°W	—	Early 19th century	A shop in red brick with paired eaves brackets and a Welsh slate roof, hipped on the left. There are three storeys and three bays. In the ground floor is a shop front with grooved Ionic pilasters, and a fascia end cornice, and to the right is a segmental-arched carriage entry. The upper floor contains sash windows with stone keystones.	II
4–8 Grove Street; 53.32259°N 0.94196°W	—	Early 19th century	A row of three shops in red brick with a modillion eaves cornice and a pantile roof. There are three storeys and four bays. In the ground floor are 19th and 20th-century shop fronts, and in the second bay is a round-arched passage entry. The upper floors contain sash windows with stuccoed wedge lintels and keystones.	II
14–18 Grove Street; 53.32256°N 0.94146°W	—	Early 19th century	A row of three red brick houses with a wooden eaves cornice and a pantile roof. There are three storeys and seven bays. Towards the right are two round-headed doorways with fluted surrounds, paterae, semicircular radiating fanlights, and flat hoods, and between them is a round-headed passage entry. In the third bay is a segmental-headed carriage archway with brick voussoirs. The windows are sashes, the window above the carriageway with carved voussoirs.	II
22 Grove Street; 53.32256°N 0.94113°W	—	Early 19th century	A shop in red brick with an eaves cornice and a Welsh slate roof. There are three storeys and two bays. In the ground floor is a shop front with plain pilasters, and to the right is a round-headed passage entry. The upper floors contain segmental-headed sash windows.	II
24–28 Grove Street; 53.32257°N 0.94091°W		Early 19th century	A house and a shop in red brick with a pantile roof. There are three storeys and four bays. In the right bay is a late 19th-century shop front, to its left is a doorway with a moulded surround and a blocked ornamental rectangular fanlight, and further to the left is a round-headed passage entry. Most of the windows are sashes.	II
31A and 31 Market Place; 53.32356°N 0.94271°W	—	Early 19th century	A pair of rendered shops with a moulded eaves cornice and a Welsh slate roof. There are three storeys and seven bays. In the ground floor is a round-arched doorway with a rusticated channelled surround, flanked by modern shop fronts. The upper floors contain windows, those in the right bay blocked.	II
13 Market Square; 53.32250°N 0.94265°W		Early 19th century	A rendered shop with a plain eaves cornice and a Welsh slate roof. There are three storeys and two bays. In the ground floor is a modern shop front, and the upper floors contain sash windows.	II
19 The Square; 53.32265°N 0.94372°W		Early 19th century	A house in red brick on a stone plinth, with a modillion eaves cornice and a slate roof. There are three storeys and three bays. In the left bay, three steps lead up to a doorway with a shaped stucco surround, a semicircular fanlight, and a cornice on brackets, and to its left is a round-arched passage entry with a moulded surround. The windows are sashes with shaped stucco frames, those in the ground and middle floors with cornices, those in the middle floor with iron balconies, and the central window with a pediment.	II
Former stables, 19 Welham Road; 53.32874°N 0.93245°W	—	Early 19th century	The stables, later converted for other uses, are in painted brick and have a hipped slate roof. There are two storeys, and they contain a blocked coach entry, garage doors and modern windows.	II
25 and 27 Welham Road; 53.32850°N 0.93184°W	—	Early 19th century	A pair of houses in chequered brick with a pantile roof. There are two storeys and four bays. Most of the windows are hung sashes with painted voussoirs. No. 25 has a modern bow window, and a doorway with a rectangular fanlight and a hood on brackets.	II
All Hallows Cottage; 53.31249°N 0.93745°W		Early 19th century	The house is in red brick with an eaves cornice, and a pantile roof with coped gables and kneelers. There are two storeys and two bays. The doorway has plain pilasters with reeded capitals and a cornice, and to the right is a blocked segmental-arched opening. The windows are hung sashes with segmental heads.	II
Old Lodge, Babworth Hall; 53.32084°N 0.96147°W	—	Early 19th century	The lodge is stuccoed and has a Welsh slate roof and a single storey. It contains a window with two lancet lights.	II
Black Boy Public House and 12 Moorgate; 53.32530°N 0.94001°W		Early 19th century	The public house and adjoining house are in red brick, the public house rendered, and they have an eaves cornice and a pantile roof. There are three storeys and five bays. The house to the right has two bays, a central doorway with pilasters, a three-light fanlight and an entablature. In the ground floor of the public house are modern windows and a doorway, and to the right is an elliptical-headed carriage entry. The windows in both parts are sashes with segmental heads.	II
Galway Arms Public House; 53.32451°N 0.94697°W		Early 19th century	The public house is in brick, with a rendered floor band, a moulded eaves cornice and a Welsh slate roof. There are two storeys and seven bays. In the ground floor are two doorways with pilasters and cornices, modern windows, including a bow window, and a segmental-arched carriage entry on the left. The upper floor contains casement windows with brick voussoirs, the window above the carriage arch with a segmental head.	II
Grove Mill; 53.32201°N 0.93596°W		Early 19th century	Originally a malthouse beside the Chesterfield Canal, and later a mill, it is in brick with an eaves cornice, and a hipped Welsh slate roof. There are three storeys and a semi-basement, and eight bays. The mill contains small camber-headed windows, and a hatch beneath a pediment.	II
Idle Valley Tap; 53.31982°N 0.94171°W		Early 19th century	The public house, formerly the Anchor Inn, is stuccoed, on a plinth, with paired eaves brackets and a Welsh slate roof. There are two storeys and three bays. The doorway has plain pilasters and a moulded cornice, The ground floor windows are casements and in the upper floor are sash windows, all with shutters.	II
Moorgate Villa; 53.32854°N 0.93258°W	—	Early 19th century	A stuccoed house with a hipped slate roof, two storeys and three bays. Steps lead up to the central doorway that has grooved half-columns and a semicircular fanlight, and the windows are hung sashes.	II
Former New Inn public house 53.31286°N 0.93895°W		Early 19th century	The house, formerly a public house, is in painted brick on a plinth, with a moulded cornice, and a hipped Welsh slate roof. There are two storeys, three bays, and a single-storey single-bay extension on the right. The central doorway has pilasters, a rectangular fanlight and a moulded cornice. To its left is a canted bay window, and the other windows are hung sashes, with wedge lintels and keystones.	II
Newcastle House; 53.32423°N 0.94653°W		Early 19th century	At one time a public house, the building is in red brick with a floor band, three storeys and four bays. In the right bay is a segmental carriage arch, and in the second bay is a round-headed doorway with a rusticated surround, a semicircular fanlight, and a cornice on consoles. This is flanked by modern windows, and the upper floors contain sash windows with segmental heads.	II
Storcroft House; 53.31398°N 0.93295°W		Early 19th century	The house is in red brick with stone dressings and a hipped slate roof, two storeys and five bays. In the centre, steps lead up to a doorway with Tuscan engaged columns, a rectangular traceried fanlight, a frieze and a cornice. This is flanked by canted bay windows, and in the upper floor are hung sash windows with flat brick arches.	II
The Cottage; 53.31472°N 0.93415°W		Early 19th century	A house in painted brick, the main block with two storeys, two bays and a Welsh slate roof, and a single-storey single-bay wing to the left with a pantile roof. To the right is a doorway with a gabled hood, and the windows are hung sashes with segmental heads.	II
The Elms Hotel; 53.31374°N 0.93499°W		Early 19th century	A house, later a hotel, it is stuccoed, and has wide eaves with a panelled soffit, and a hipped Welsh slate roof. There are two storeys, a symmetrical front of five bays, single-storey single-bay side wings, and rear extensions. In the centre is a porch with fluted Greek Doric columns and a panelled soffit, and a round-arched doorway with a semicircular traceried fanlight. Above it is a full-height window, and a balcony with a cast iron balustrade. Most of the other windows are sashes.	II
The Old Vicarage; 53.32800°N 0.93258°W	—	Early 19th century	The former vicarage is in red brick with wide overhanging eaves and a hipped slate roof. There are two storeys and three bays. The doorway has pilasters, a frieze and a cornice, and the windows are hung sashes.	II
Protestant Place; 53.32154°N 0.95133°W		1826	A terrace of eight cottages in red brick with a hipped pantile roof. There are two storeys and eight bays. The doorways and the windows, which are sashes, have segmental heads.	II
St Saviour's Church; 53.32804°N 0.93348°W		1827–29	A Commissioners' Church designed by E. J. Willson, it was restored in 1977. The church is built in yellow brick with limestone dressings and blue slate roofs, and consists of a nave, north and south aisles, and a shallow chancel. At the west end are two octagonal turrets with slim openings and ogee lead-roofed caps. The east and west windows have five lights, and the windows along the aisles have three lights.	II
Holy Trinity Hospital; 53.32324°N 0.95066°W		1832–33	A group of almshouses designed by Edward Blore in Tudor style, incorporating material from an earlier building on the site, they were extended in 1872 by James Fowler. The almshouses are in red brick with stone dressings, and are arranged in three ranges round a courtyard. In the centre is a chapel with a clock tower. The almshouses have a single storey and an attic, a doorway and a two-light mullioned window, both with a hood mould, and a gabled dormer, and the end buildings have bay windows. The grounds are enclosed by an arcaded stone wall with urn finials, and at the entrance is an overthrow with a four-centred arch.	II
Gothic Cottage; 53.32498°N 0.93990°W	—	1834	The cottage is in brick with terracotta dressings, the front is painted white, it has an eaves band with Gothick tracery, and a pantile roof with terracotta coped gables. There are two storeys and three bays. In the centre is a porch with a slightly pointed arch, and a doorway with a moulded pointed arch and a fanlight with Gothick tracery. The doorway is flanked by buttresses with finials, above which is a coat of arms and a dated shield. The windows are sashes with pointed arches, moulded surrounds, and ornate hoods and aprons. Flanking the window above the doorway are projecting canopied niches containing statues.	II
22 Bridgegate; 53.32381°N 0.94391°W	—	Early to mid 19th century	A shop, rendered and painted, with a moulded floor band, a moulded eaves cornice, and a Welsh slate roof. There are three storeys and three bays. In the ground floor is a modern shop front, and the upper floors contain hung sash windows with moulded surrounds, those in the middle floor with shouldered architraves.	II
6 Carolgate; 53.32225°N 0.94250°W	—	Early to mid 19th century	A shop with a pantile roof, three storeys and two bays. In the ground floor is a modern shop front, and the upper floors contain sash windows with brick voussoirs.	II
81 Carolgate; 53.31991°N 0.94146°W		Early to mid 19th century	A shop in red brick with a wooden eaves cornice and a slate roof, two storeys and four bays, In the centre is a doorway with a moulded surround and a rectangular three-light fanlight. The windows are hung sashes with wedge lintels.	II
Ordsall House; 53.31671°N 0.93708°W		Early to mid 19th century	The house is rendered and has a hipped Welsh slate roof. There are two storeys, four bays, and a single-bay wing to the right. The doorway has a rectangular fanlight, to its left is a bay window, and the other windows are hung sashes. To the right of the house are cast iron railings.	II
The Hollies; 53.31779°N 0.93739°W		Early to mid 19th century	Three houses combined into one, it is in red brick on a stone plinth, with paired eaves brackets, and a Welsh slate roof with a central pediment. There are two storeys and five bays. In the centre is a rectangular porch and a doorway with a rectangular fanlight, and the windows are hung sashes.	II
3 and 4 Market Place; 53.32339°N 0.94234°W	—	Early to mid 19th century	A pair of shops in red brick with a sill band and a Welsh slate roof. There are three storeys and four bays. In the ground floor are modern shop fronts, the windows in the middle floor have cornices on consoles, and those in the top floor have wedge lintels and triple keystones.	II
66–72 Bridgegate; 53.32462°N 0.94721°W		Mid 19th century	A row of almshouses in red brick with stone dressings, rusticated quoins, a sill band, a modillion cornice, and a Welsh slate roof. There are two storeys and seven bays, the third and fourth bays projecting slightly under a modillion pediment. In the ground floor are three doorways with rectangular fanlights and bracketed gabled hoods with finials, and a round-arched passage entry. The windows are sashes, those in the ground floor and the upper floor of the projecting bays with hood moulds.	II
4 Carolgate; 53.32231°N 0.94250°W	—	Mid 19th century	A shop in red brick with a sill band and a pantile roof. There are three storeys and two bays. In the ground floor is a shop front with arcaded windows and doorway, a cornice on brackets, and a flat-headed entry to the right. The upper floors contain sash windows with moulded surrounds, those in the middle floor with cornices on carved brackets.	II
5 Carolgate; 53.32250°N 0.94232°W	—	Mid 19th century	A brick shop with a sill band and a pantile roof. There are three storeys and three bays. In the ground floor is a modern shop front. The upper floors contain hung sash windows in shouldered surrounds with sill brackets, those in the middle floor with segmental-arched heads and keystones.	II
19 Carolgate; 53.32196°N 0.94230°W	—	Mid 19th century	A shop in red brick with a pantile roof, three storeys and two bays. In the ground floor is a 19th-century shop front, and the upper floors contain windows with segmental heads.	II
83 Carolgate; 53.31980°N 0.94145°W		Mid 19th century	A shop on a corner site in red brick, with a hipped Welsh slate roof. There are three storeys, three bays on the front, and two on the right return. In the ground floor is a modern shop front, and a segmental-headed carriage arch to the left. The upper floors contain sash windows with brick voussoirs.	II
1 Market Place; 53.32357°N 0.94232°W	—	Mid 19th century	A shop in painted stucco, with a sill band, a modillion eaves cornice and a Welsh slate roof. There are three storeys and four bays. In the ground floor are shop fronts, and the upper floors contain windows with moulded shouldered architraves.	II
Walls in front of King Edward VI School; 53.31813°N 0.93883°W		Mid 19th century	The wall running along the front of the grounds of the school is in brick with stone coping. It contains stone gate piers and railings.	II
Lamp standards, Town Hall; 53.32250°N 0.94320°W		Mid 19th century	The four lamp standards in front of the town hall are in cast iron. Each lamp has a fluted column on a plinth.	II
The Sebastopol Cannon; 53.32382°N 0.94174°W		Mid 19th century	The cannon, which was captured at the Battle of Sevastopol in 1855, is mounted on a wooden gun carriage on two stone steps. It is surrounded by a chain guard and iron posts, and above it is an iron overthrow with a lamp.	II
Holly Mount; 53.31732°N 0.93675°W		1852	A stuccoed villa, the ground floor in channelled rustication, with rusticated quoins and paired eaves brackets, and two storeys. On the front is a two-storey canted bay window, and the other windows are hung sashes with moulded surrounds. The porch has plain columns and an entablature.	II
Original portion, King Edward VI School; 53.31840°N 0.93842°W		1855–57	The school was designed by Decimus Burton in Tudor style, and is in red brick with stone dressings and a Welsh slate roof. The main feature is a tower containing an entrance with a moulded arch and decorated dated spandrels, over which is a coat of arms, a mullioned and transomed window, a clock in a gabled surround, and a parapet with pinnacles and finials. This is surmounted by a polygonal lantern with gargoyles and a slated spire with a finial. The tower is flanked by ranges of one and two storeys, with large windows, roof dormers and gabled bays.	II
Town Hall; 53.32244°N 0.94322°W		1866–68	The town hall was designed by Bellamy and Hardy. It is built in Bath stone with red Mansfield stone, and has two storeys and five bays, the outer bays projecting, and containing are doorways flanked by paired columns. Above them is a balustrade with finials, and round-headed windows, between which are columns, and in the outer bays rusticated pilasters. Above the upper floor is another balustrade with finials, and over the three inner bays is a curved Mansard roof with a wooden clock tower, an octagonal bellcote and a weathervane. The outer bays have pavilion roofs with iron cresting.	II
Methodist Church; 53.32259°N 0.93886°W		1879–80	The church was designed by Bellamy and Hardy, and is built in red brick with stone dressings, and has a slate roof and two storeys. The front is in three parts, the middle part wider and gabled. In the centre, steps lead up to double doors with columns and a semicircular fanlight, flanked by tall narrow round-headed windows, and over all are arched mouldings and foliated keystones. Above are three similar windows, the middle one taller and larger, over which is an inscribed and dated plaque. The outer bays contain a window in each floor, over which are bracketed eaves, and a balustraded parapet with ball finials. Along the sides are five bays containing similar windows in both floors.	II
Retford railway station, gate piers and walls 53.31528°N 0.94785°W		1891–92	The station was built by the Great Northern Railway on the east side of the line, replacing an earlier station on the site. It is in yellow brick with dressings in darker brick, and it has a slate roof. There is one storey, apart from the stationmaster's house which has two storeys, it has a long linear plan, and is in Italianate style. On the platform side is a long canopy with decorative ironwork. At the northern end of the station are a pair of tall square piers in white brick with blue brick quoins and pyramidal caps, and short lengths of white brick walls.	II
St Alban's Church; 53.31750°N 0.93720°W		1902–03	The church was designed in Perpendicular style by C. Hodgson Fowler, and the west end was completed in 1931. It was damaged by fire in 2008, and is derelict. The church is built in limestone, the extension is in brick, and the roof was tiled. The church consists of a nave with a clerestory, north and south aisles, and a chancel with a north transept and a south Lady chapel. In the transept is a rose window, and on its western corner is an octagonal turret with a tall pyramidal roof and a finial.	II
Canal crane 53.31895°N 0.94202°W		Early 20th century	The crane on the wharf on the south side of Retford Basin on the Chesterfield Canal has a cast iron base and wooden loading arm. The arm is raised by a wire rope with a pulley wheel.	II
Retford War Memorial; 53.32276°N 0.94309°W		1921	The war memorial, in the centre of The Square, is in stone and in the form of an Eleanor Cross. It consists of a base of three steps, a plinth with four stages, upper parts carved with trefoils and gargoyles, and at the top are finials and a domed cap. On the sides of the plinth are inscriptions, and the names of those lost in the two World Wars and in the Korean War.	II*
Fives Court War Memorial; 53.31908°N 0.93673°W		1924	The war memorial is in the form of a fives court in the grounds of King Edward VI School, and is to the memory of a former pupil and teacher of the school who was killed in the First World War. It is in brick with stone copings, and has a back wall about 4 metres (13 ft) high, and side walls that curve down to pillars at the front. In the left wall is an inscribed stone.	II
Majestic Cinema; 53.32130°N 0.94356°W		1927	Built as a combined cinema and theatre, it was designed by Alfred Thraves. The building is in red brick with dressings in Portland stone, and it has slate roofs. The entrance on the left has a moulded surround and contains steps and double doors with Art Deco glazing. Above is a round arch containing mullions decorated with theatrical masks in relief, and windows with Art Deco glazing. To the right are staggered staircase windows, and beyond are two storeys under a Mansard roof, a fly tower, and a projecting sign board.	II
