= Edwin Arthur Ward =

British artist

- Born: 1859; Basford, Nottingham, England
- Died: 1933 (aged 73–74); Dorset, England
- Occupation: Artist

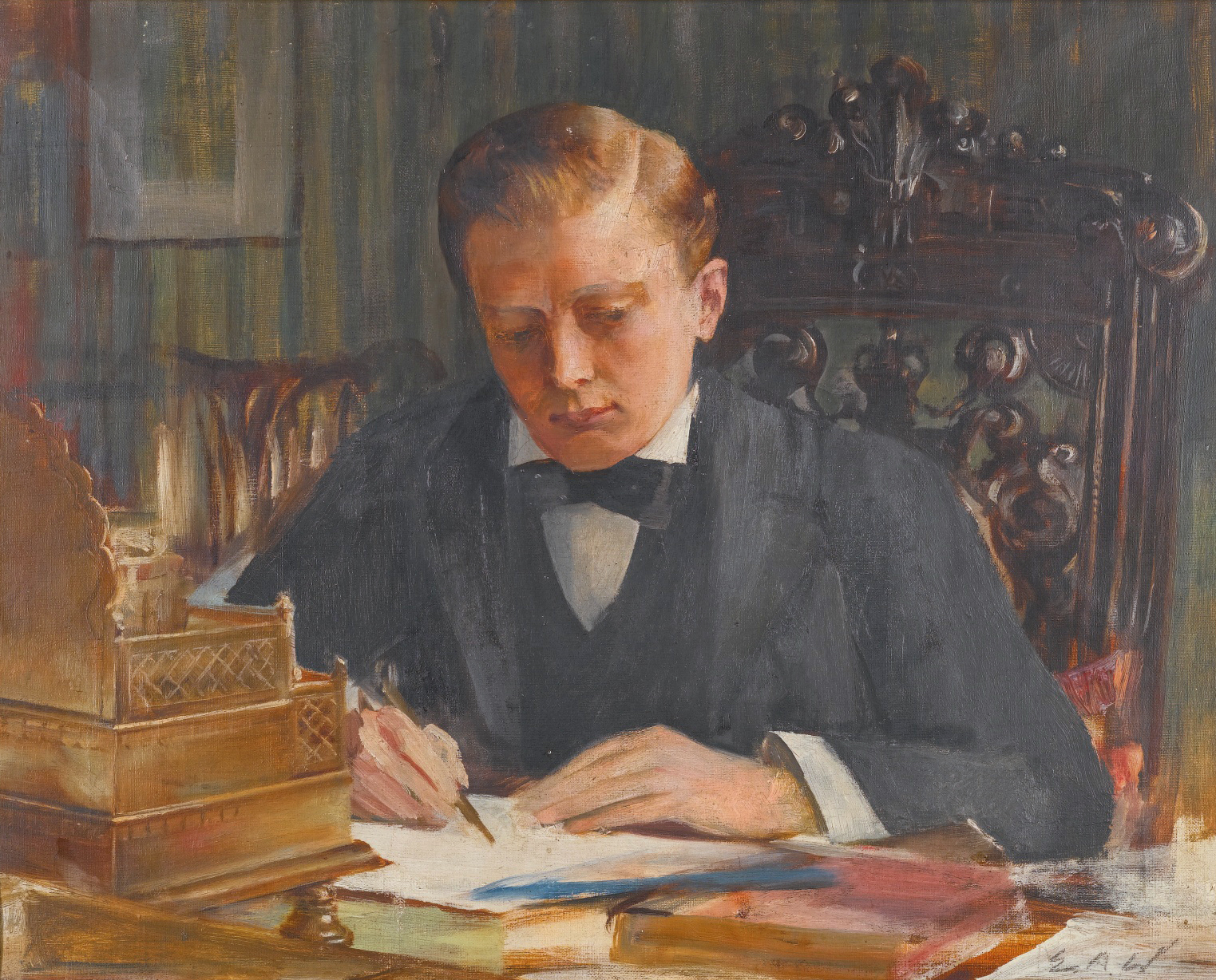
Winston Churchill by Edwin Arthur Ward

Edwin Arthur Ward (1859–1933) was a British artist who established himself in London as a society portrait painter. Ward was born in Basford in Nottingham and moved to London at the age of 19. Between 1884 and 1903 he was a regular exhibitor at the Royal Academy in London. He also exhibited with the Royal Society of British Artists and elsewhere. In 1891 he was elected a member of the Royal Society of Portrait Painters. One of his daughters, Nora England also became an artist. Ward died in Dorset and Nottingham Castle Museum holds examples of his paintings.

== Examples of work ==
- Portrait of Thomas Bescoby (1890) - Retford Town Hall
