= Hayton, Nottinghamshire =

Coordinates: 53.33°N 0.90°W

Hayton
- Civil parish
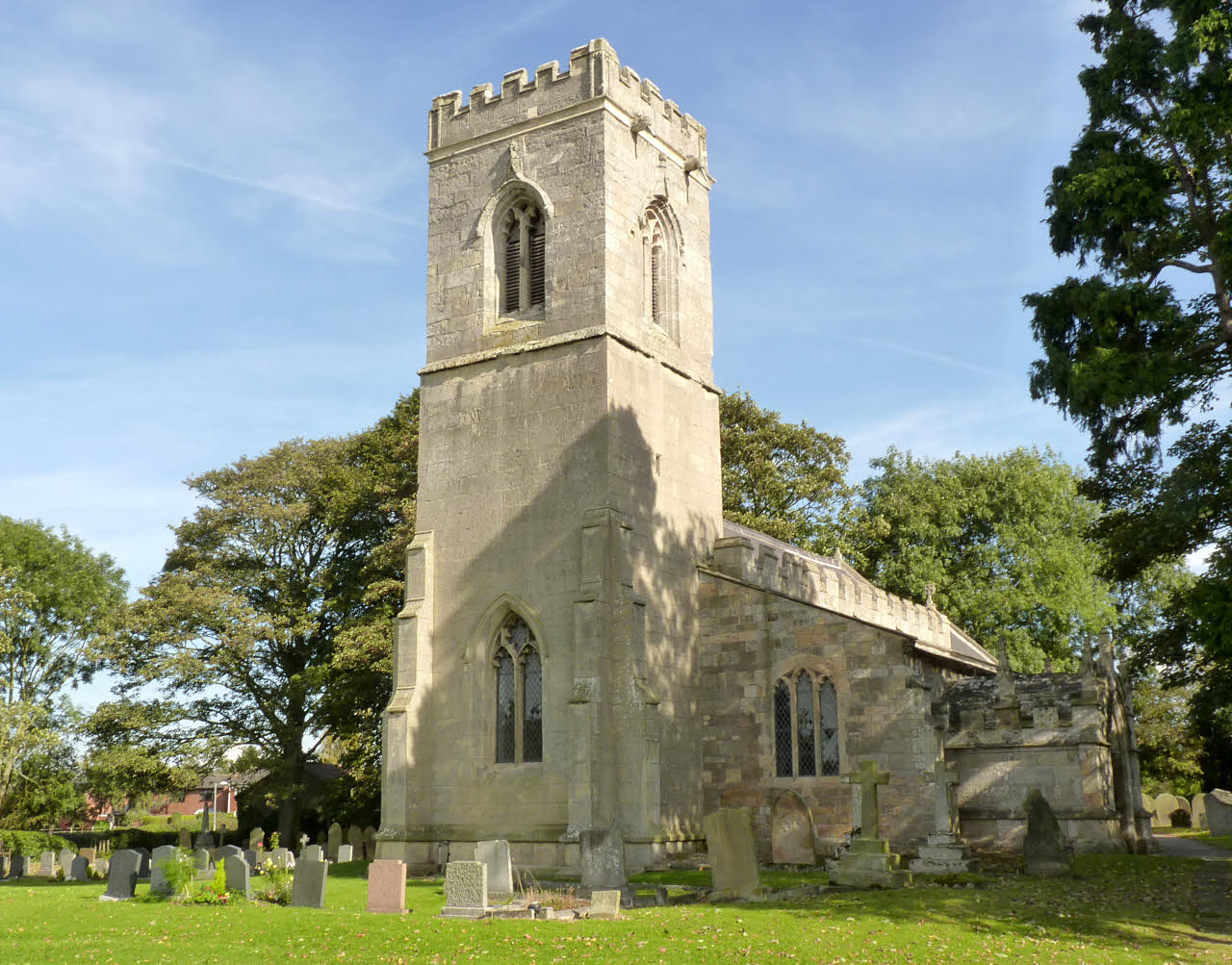
- Church of St Peter, Hayton

- Location within Nottinghamshire
- Interactive map of Hayton
- Area: 4.39 sq mi (11.4 km^{2})
- Population: 361 (2021)
  - Density: 82/sq mi (32/km^{2})
- OS grid reference: SK 729843
  - London: 130 mi (210 km) SE
- District: Bassetlaw
- Shire county: Nottinghamshire
- Region: East Midlands
- Country: England
- Sovereign state: United Kingdom
- Places: Hayton; Tiln
- Post town: RETFORD
- Postcode district: DN22
- Dialling code: 01777
- Police: Nottinghamshire
- Fire: Nottinghamshire
- Ambulance: East Midlands
- UK Parliament: Bassetlaw
- Website: www.haytonparishcouncil-notts.org.uk

Hayton is a village in Nottinghamshire, England. It is located 4 miles north-east of Retford. According to the 2001 census it had a population (including Tiln) of 386, decreasing marginally to 385 in the 2011 census, but markedly more so in 2021 to 361. The parish church of St Peter is Norman, with 14th century windows.

== See also ==
- Listed buildings in Hayton, Nottinghamshire
