= West Retford Hotel =

Building in Retford, Nottinghamshire, England

Coordinates: 53.3260°N 0.9498°W

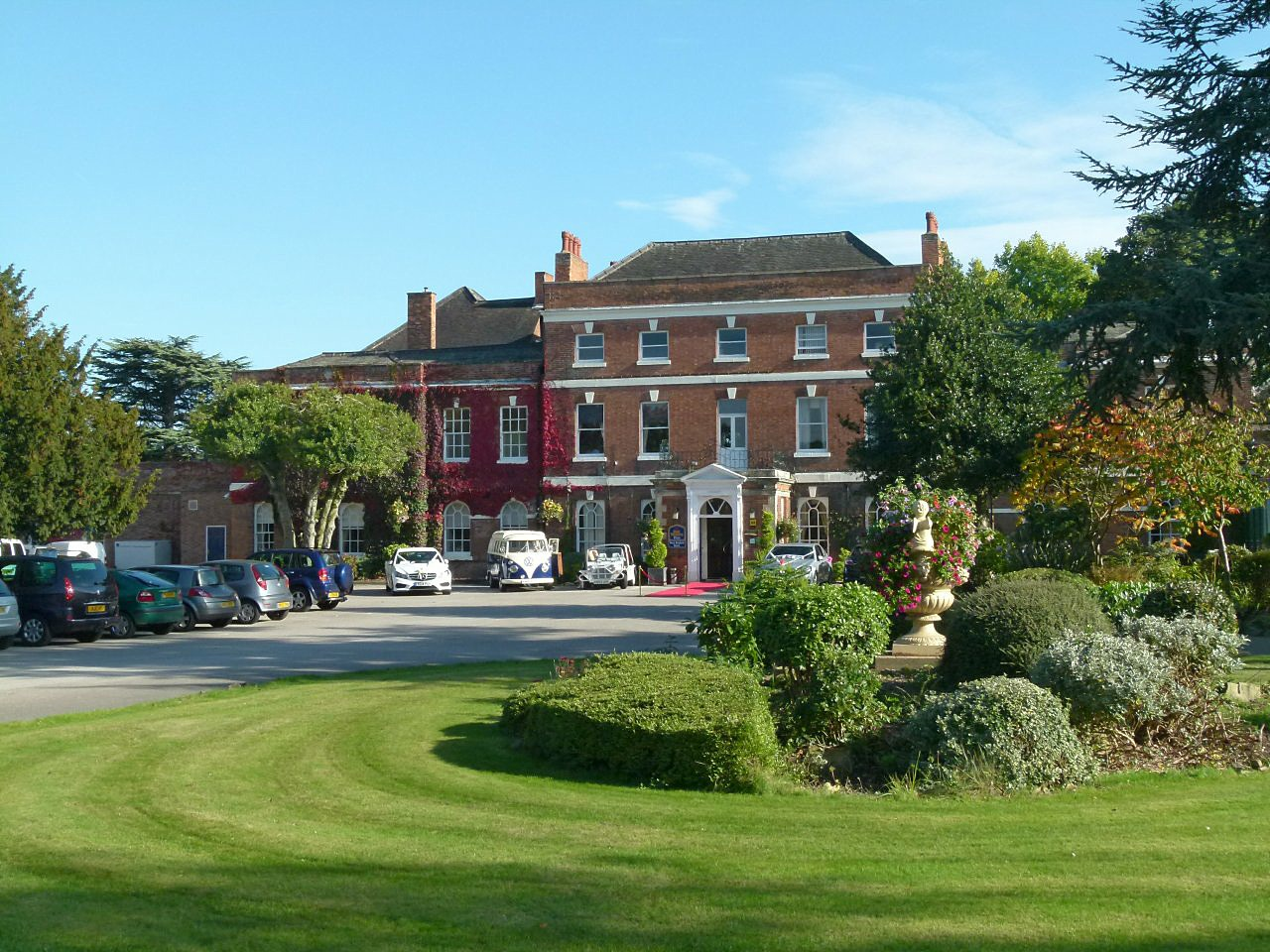
West Retford Hotel

West Retford Hotel in Nottinghamshire is a building of historical significance and is Grade II listed on the English Heritage Register. It was built in the 18th century, possibly around 1740, and was the home of many notable people over the next two centuries. Today it is a hotel which provides accommodation, restaurant and bar facilities and caters for special events.

== Early residents ==
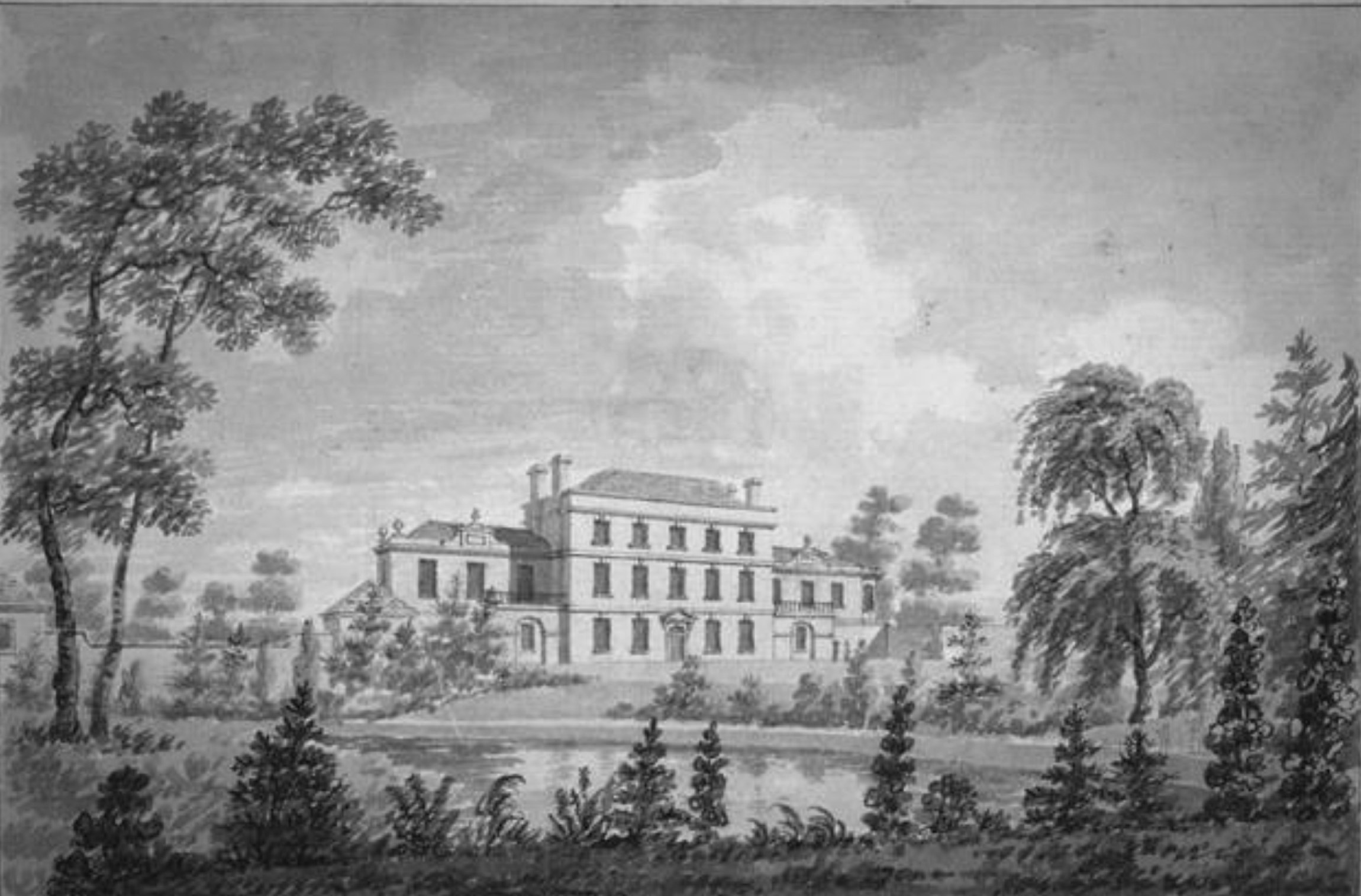
Drawing of West Retford House by Thomas Malton in 1770

Alexander Emerson (1710–1745), who inherited the West Retford estate from his relative George Wharton in 1727, built the house in about 1740. He was the son of Alexander Emerson and Alice Wharton of Caister in Lincolnshire. In 1736 he married Elizabeth Bosvile, who was the daughter and co-heir of Thomas Bosvile, Rector of Ufford. The couple had two sons.

Unfortunately, Alexander died in 1745 aged about 35. His wife Elizabeth with two very young children remarried in the same year. Her second husband was the Reverend Stephen Ashton, Vicar of Louth, Lincolnshire. She died in 1791 in Louth.

Alexander Emerson (1746–1808) who was the younger son of the couple mentioned above inherited West Retford House when he came of age. In 1771 he married Susannah Lyon, daughter and co-heir of Captain Patrick Lyon of East Thetford. Alexander's brother was Sir Wharton Amcotts who was the Member of Parliament for East Retford for many years.

A book written in 1786 when Alexander was the owner says that the Prince Regent, later King George IV on visiting the house said that the north west view “struck him from its pleasant situation more than any house he had noticed in his journey from the north.

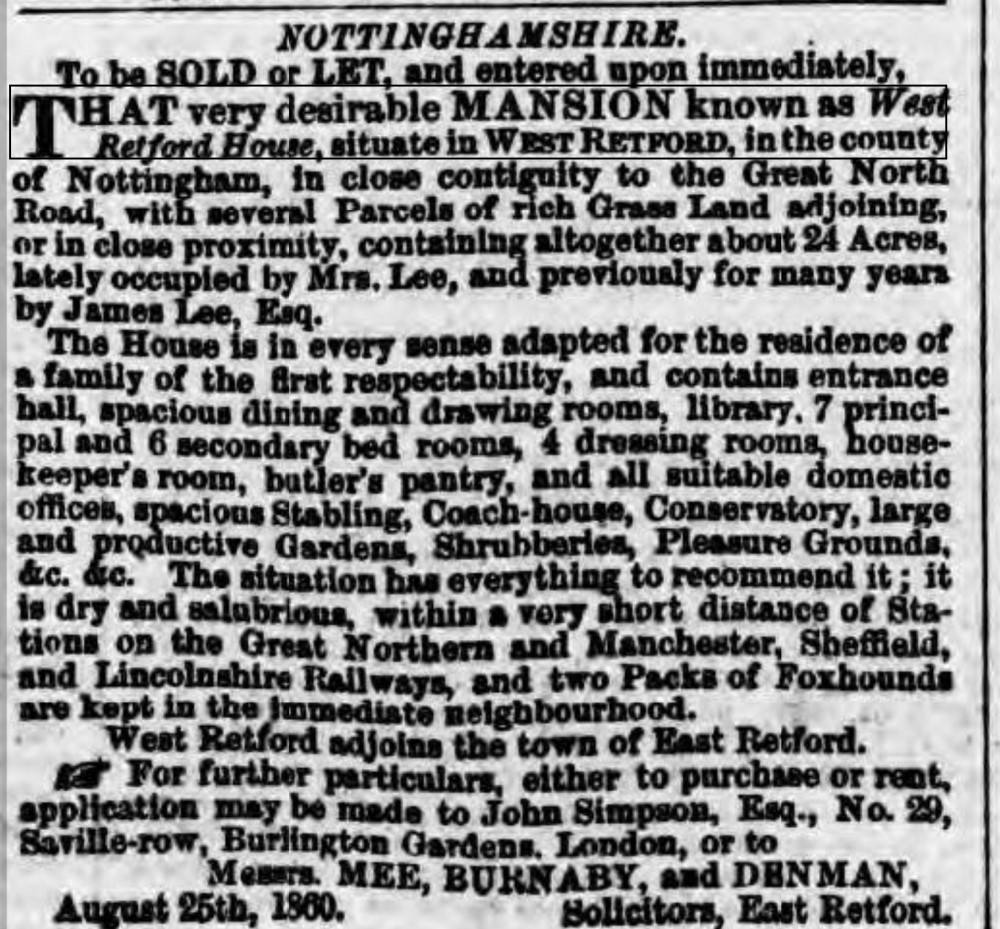
Sale notice for West Retford House in 1860

The artist Thomas Malton drew a view of West Retford House which he exhibited at the Royal Academy in 1777. It was later turned into an engraving and published in the book called “Picturesque views of the principal seats of the nobility and gentry in England and Wales” in 1786. This drawing is shown. It may be that the house was also admired by the Prince Regent's father as there is a copy of it in the personal collection of King George III.

Alexander sold the house to Robert William Evelyn Sutton (1766–1805) in 1800. Robert was born in 1766 in Worksop, Nottinghamshire. His family had owned Scofton Hall for several generations and he sold it to buy West Retford House. In 1793 he married Mary Verelst (1773–1860), who was the daughter of Harry Verelst, a colonial administrator with the British East India Company and the governor of Bengal. The couple had no children.

Robert died in 1805 and left West Retford House to his wife Mary. In 1819 she married James Lee (1770–1858) of Carleton Hall near Pontefract. He was a widower with one daughter Ann Lee who occasionally lived with them. They are all shown in the 1851 census with a butler, a footman, two ladies maids, a cook and four domestic servants. Robert and Mary lived in West Retford House for about forty years. He died in 1858 and she died in 1860. The house was advertised for sale after Mary died and bought by Henry Beilby William Milner.

== Later residents ==
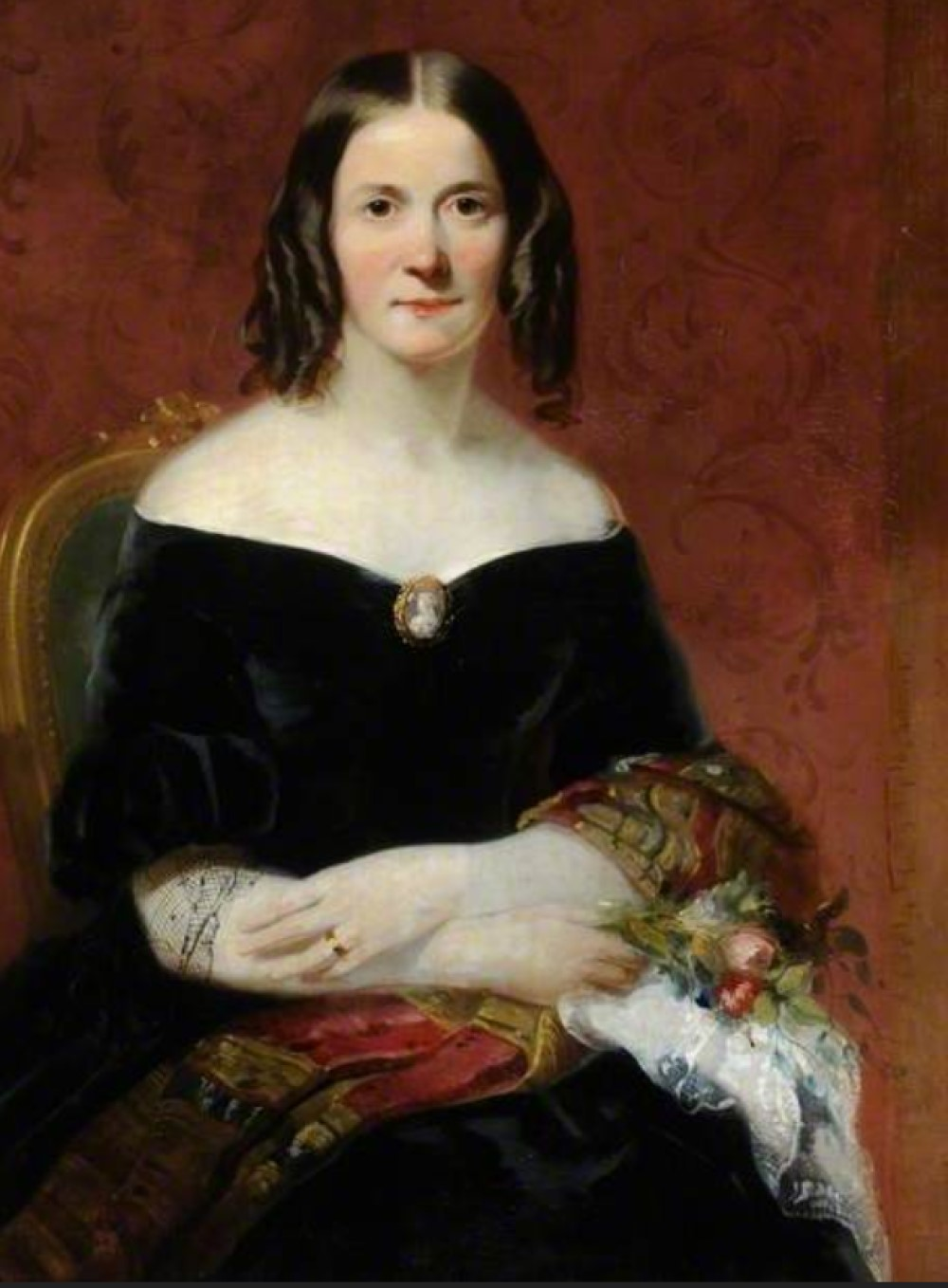
Maria Overend

Henry Beilby William Milner was born in 1823 in Bolton Percy in Yorkshire. His father was Sir William Mordaunt Sturt Milner, 4th Bt of Nun Appleton Hall. In 1853 he married Charlotte Henrietta Beresford who was the daughter of Marcus Beresford, Archbishop of Armagh. He was a partner in a Bank in Leeds and was at one time Mayor of Retford. The newspapers of 1862 reveal that he made substantial alterations to the house. The census of 1871 records that the family was living at West Retford House with their three sons and three daughters. In 1872 they moved back to Leeds and it appears that the house was let to the Overend family. In 1876 Henry Beilby William Milner died and his eldest son Major Edward Milner (1858–1937) inherited the property. He continued to rent it to the Overend couple.

William Overend was a Queen's Counsel. There is a bust of him by Sir Joseph Edgar Boehm which can be seen at this reference. In 1871 he married Maria Hounsfield (née Scholefield) (1813–1896) who was the widow of George Hounsfield, a wealthy banker in Sheffield. In 1884 William died and Maria continued to live at West Retford House. She had inherited large sums from both of her husbands and was an extremely wealthy woman. As she had no children, she gave very generous gifts to many charities. After she died in 1896 the house was rented by Major Milner to the Peake family.

George Herbert Peake was a Barrister and at one time Mayor of East Retford. He was born in 1859 in Sleaford, Lincolnshire. In 1895 he married Evelyn Mary Dundas. In 1905 the couple bought Bawtry Hall and shortly after moved there. West Retford House was vacant for two years but it was reported in the newspapers that Major Milner allowed fetes and community events to be held there. In 1908 it was let to George Arthur Bridgeman-Simpson and his wife Lady Mary Eleanor Fortescue (1849–1948). He died in 1913 and his wife lived there for two more years. After her departure the owner Major Edward Milner lived there with his wife Evelyn Augusta Rowley from 1915 until about 1926 when it was sold to Dr John Camidge Teasdale.

Dr John Camidge Teasdale was a physician and surgeon and lived at the house until his death in 1953. He was born in 1877 in York. His father John Teasdale was an attorney. He married twice. His first wife was Josephine Marian Mc Dowell whom he married in 1906. She died at West Retford House in 1932. In 1939 he married Margaret Elizabeth Stanley. After John died in 1953 Margaret moved to a smaller house in East Retford and lived there until her death in 1996. West Retford House later became a hotel and still serves this function today.

== See also ==
- Listed buildings in Retford
