= Gamston, Bassetlaw =

Coordinates: 53.28°N 0.94°W

Gamston
- Village and Civil parish
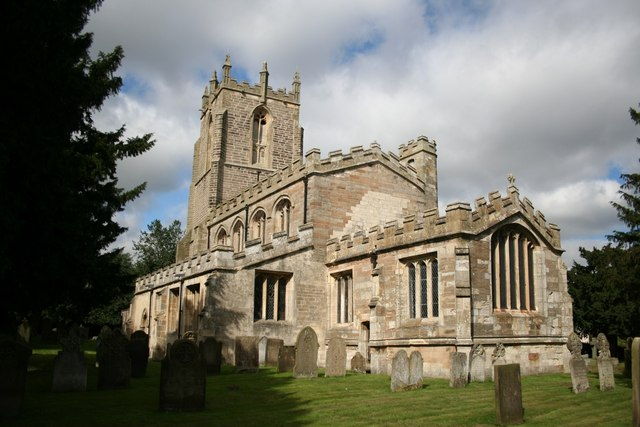
- St Peter's Church, Gamston

- Location within Nottinghamshire
- Interactive map of Gamston
- Area: 3.08 sq mi (8.0 km^{2})
- Population: 253 (2021)
  - Density: 82/sq mi (32/km^{2})
- OS grid reference: SK705765
  - London: 125 mi (201 km) SE
- District: Bassetlaw
- Shire county: Nottinghamshire
- Region: East Midlands
- Country: England
- Sovereign state: United Kingdom
- Post town: RETFORD
- Postcode district: DN22
- Dialling code: 01777
- Police: Nottinghamshire
- Fire: Nottinghamshire
- Ambulance: East Midlands
- UK Parliament: Newark
- Website: www.gamstonwestdraytoneatonparishcouncil.co.uk

Gamston is a village and civil parish four miles south of Retford in the English county of Nottinghamshire. The village lies on the A638 road between Retford and the Markham Moor junction with the A1 and the A57 roads. The population of the civil parish as at the 2011 Census was 246, which increased to 253 in 2021. The River Idle lies to the west of the village.

St Peter's Church is a Grade I listed building. Gamston was home to a rectory in the past, and today forms the name of a lane in the village.

To the east of the village, beyond the East Coast railway line, is Gamston Wood. The ancient parish wood was purchased by the Forestry Commission in 1984 and covers 41 hectares (100 acres). The area has been designated as a Site of Specific Interest.

== Historical Events ==
The village has played a significant role in Baptist history, especially as the baptismal place of the 'Baptist John Wesley', Dan Taylor. A Baptist congregation met in the village from about 1690, at first led by Aaron Jeffrey.

Henry Fynes Clinton (1781–1852), an English classical scholar, chronologist and Member of Parliament was born in Gamston.

== Education ==
The village is home to one school, Gamston Church of England Primary School.

== Retford Gamston Airport ==
Retford Gamston Airport, a former RAF aerodrome, is a small airport based to the west of the village on the B6387 road. The airport is used for small private aircraft as well as the base for several flying schools.
