= Sutton cum Lound =

Village and civil parish in Nottinghamshire, England

Coordinates: 53.35°N 0.98°W

- Village
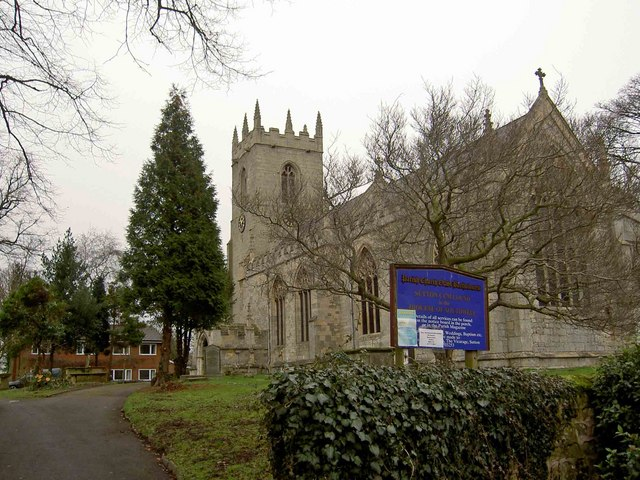
- St. Bartholomew's church

- Location within Nottinghamshire
- Sutton parish map
- Area: 3.04 sq mi (7.9 km^{2}) (Sutton parish)
- Population: 683 (2021) (Sutton parish)
  - Density: 225/sq mi (87/km^{2})
- OS grid reference: SK 681847
  - London: 130 mi (210 km) SSE
- Civil parish: Sutton
- District: Bassetlaw
- Shire county: Nottinghamshire
- Region: East Midlands
- Country: England
- Sovereign state: United Kingdom
- Post town: RETFORD
- Postcode district: DN22
- Dialling code: 01777
- Police: Nottinghamshire
- Fire: Nottinghamshire
- Ambulance: East Midlands
- UK Parliament: Bassetlaw
- Website: www.suttoncumlound.net

Sutton Cum Lound is a village located in Bassetlaw, north Nottinghamshire. It is located 3 miles from Retford. The civil parish is called Sutton. According to the 2001 census it had a population of 687, falling slightly to 673 at the 2011 census, and recovering to 683 at the 2021 census. The parish church of St Bartholomew is Norman, rebuilt in the Perpendicular style, with "unbridled curvilinear tracery" in the chancel windows. The village has a primary school. It borders the village of Barnby Moor which is about 1 mile away and is also very close to the village of Lound. The village has a number of public footpaths and walks such as those on Mire Hill.

In 958, King Edgar granted an estate at Sutton to Oscytel, Archbishop of York.

The village sometimes has traffic problems caused by the level crossing on Station Road which leads to Barnby Moor, The crossing goes over the East Coast Main Line, which is a very busy railway line. However, there are three entrances to the village in total.

The village is also very close to the Wetlands Wildlife Park near Lound and many of its fishing lakes, as well as the Idle Valley Nature Reserve wetlands Site of Special Scientific Interest to the east of the village within walking distance.

Mike Reid, an actor who played the part of Frank Butcher in the BBC programme EastEnders used to live in the village in the late 1970s.

== See also ==
- Listed buildings in Sutton cum Lound
