= Tiln =

Coordinates: 53.35°N 0.95°W

- Location within Nottinghamshire
- OS grid reference: SK703841
- Civil parish: Hayton
- District: Bassetlaw
- Shire county: Nottinghamshire
- Region: East Midlands
- Country: England
- Sovereign state: United Kingdom
- Post town: RETFORD
- Postcode district: DN22
- Police: Nottinghamshire
- Fire: Nottinghamshire
- Ambulance: East Midlands
- UK Parliament: Bassetlaw

Tiln is a hamlet in the civil parish of Hayton, in the Bassetlaw district, in the county of Nottinghamshire, England. It is located on the River Idle, 2 miles north of Retford, a mile north of Bolham and ½ mile from Retford Sewage Works. Tiln North Quarry is owned by Tarmac Ltd. Sand and gravel are extracted from this and other quarries in the area. Tiln was recorded in the Domesday Book as Tille/Tilne.
