= Listed buildings in Askham, Nottinghamshire =

Askham is a civil parish in the Bassetlaw District of Nottinghamshire, England. The parish contains five listed buildings that are recorded in the National Heritage List for England. Of these, two are listed at Grade II*, the middle of the three grades, and the others are at Grade II, the lowest grade. The parish contains the village of Askham and the surrounding countryside. All the listed buildings are in the village, and consist of two houses, a church, a public house, and a group of farm buildings.

== Key ==
Grade	Criteria
II*	Particularly important buildings of more than special interest
II	Buildings of national importance and special interest

== Buildings ==
Name and location	Photograph	Date	Notes	Grade
St Nicholas' Church; 53.26688°N 0.89224°W		12th century	The church has been altered and extended through the centuries, including re-roofing in 1863, and a restoration in 1906–07 by C. Hodgson Fowler. The church is built in stone with a tile roof, and consists of a nave, a south porch, a chancel and a west tower. The tower is in Perpendicular in style, and has two stages, diagonal buttresses, and a plinth with a moulded band. In the bottom stage is a two-light window, the upper stage contains two-light bell openings, and a clock face on the east side, and at the top is an embattled parapet with eight crocketed pinnacles and two gargoyles.	II*
Barn and farm buildings, Manor Farm; 53.26610°N 0.89197°W	—	c. 1550	The buildings, which were later extended, consist of a barn, two ranges of cowsheds, and a dovecote. They are in red brick with some stone and some timber framing, and have pantile roofs. The barn is timber framed with brick cladding, a hipped roof, two storeys, four bays, and an aisle to the south. The buildings are arranged around a courtyard, one cowshed with a single storey and eight bays, and the other with two storeys and six bays. The dovecote has two storeys and an attic and a single bay, on a stone plinth, and with dentilled eaves.	II*
Bankside Cottage; 53.26786°N 0.89095°W		17th century	The house is timber framed with close studding and brick nogging. It has a pantile roof, two storeys and two bays, and there is a brick lean-to on the right. The windows either have a fixed light, or are horizontally-sliding sashes.	II
Manor Lodge; 53.26675°N 0.89152°W		Mid 18th century	A house in red brick with a narrow blue brick base, a floor band, dogtooth eaves, and a pantile roof with brick coped gables. There are two storeys, a main block of three bays, a two-bay extension to the left with one storey and an attic, and rear additions. In the centre of the main block is a doorway, and the windows are tripartite horizontally-sliding sashes, all with segmental-arched heads. In the extension are two fixed-light windows.	II
Duke William Public House; 53.26636°N 0.89159°W		Early 19th century	The public house is in red brick with dentilled eaves and a pantile roof. There are two storeys and attics, three bays, and a lower two-storey rear wing. In the centre is a doorway with a rectangular fanlight, and the windows are tripartite horizontally-sliding sashes with segmental-arched heads.	II
