= Listed buildings in Sutton cum Lound =

Sutton cum Lound is a civil parish in the Bassetlaw District of Nottinghamshire, England. The parish contains two listed buildings that are recorded in the National Heritage List for England. Of these, one is listed at Grade I, the highest of the three grades, and the other is at Grade II, the lowest grade. The parish contains the village of Sutton cum Lound and the surrounding area. Both listed buildings are in the village, and consist of a church and a pair of gate piers with gates.

== Key ==
Grade	Criteria
I	Buildings of exceptional interest, sometimes considered to be internationally important
II	Buildings of national importance and special interest

== Buildings ==
Name and location	Photograph	Date	Notes	Grade
St Bartholomew's Church; 53.35731°N 0.97839°W		12th century	The church has been altered and extended through the centuries, including a restoration in 1855–56. It is built in stone, and consists of a nave, a north aisle and chapel, a south porch, a chancel, and a west tower. The tower has a base and two stages, angle buttresses, a string course, an arched west window with three lights and a hood mould, clock faces, two-light arched bell openings, gargoyles, and an embattled parapet with eight crocketed pinnacles. There are also embattled parapets and crocketed pinnacles along the body of the church.	I
Gate Piers and Gates, Sutton Manor Grounds; 53.35587°N 0.97875°W	—	Late 18th century	The gate piers are in rusticated stone with coping, surmounted by pedestals with orbs. Between them are double wooden gates.	II
