= Askham, Nottinghamshire =

Village and civil parish in Nottinghamshire, England

Coordinates: 53.27°N 00.89°W

Askham
- Village and civil parish
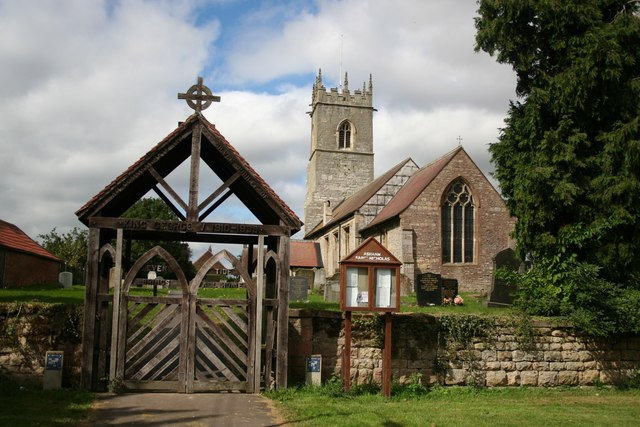
- St.Nicholas' Church

- Location within Nottinghamshire
- Interactive map of Askham
- Area: 1.75 sq mi (4.5 km^{2})
- Population: 189 (2021)
  - Density: 108/sq mi (42/km^{2})
- OS grid reference: SK7474
  - London: 125 mi (201 km) SE
- District: Bassetlaw
- Shire county: Nottinghamshire
- Region: East Midlands
- Country: England
- Sovereign state: United Kingdom
- Post town: Newark
- Postcode district: NG22
- Dialling code: 01777
- Police: Nottinghamshire
- Fire: Nottinghamshire
- Ambulance: East Midlands
- UK Parliament: Newark

Askham is a village and civil parish in the Bassetlaw district of Nottinghamshire, England, about six miles south-east of East Retford. According to the 2001 census it had a population of 183. It decreased slightly to 181 at the 2011 census, but has increased to 189 residents during the 2021 census.

St Nicholas' Church is Norman, restored in 1906–07.

== See also ==
- Listed buildings in Askham, Nottinghamshire
