= Retford Town Hall =

Municipal building in Retford, Nottinghamshire, England

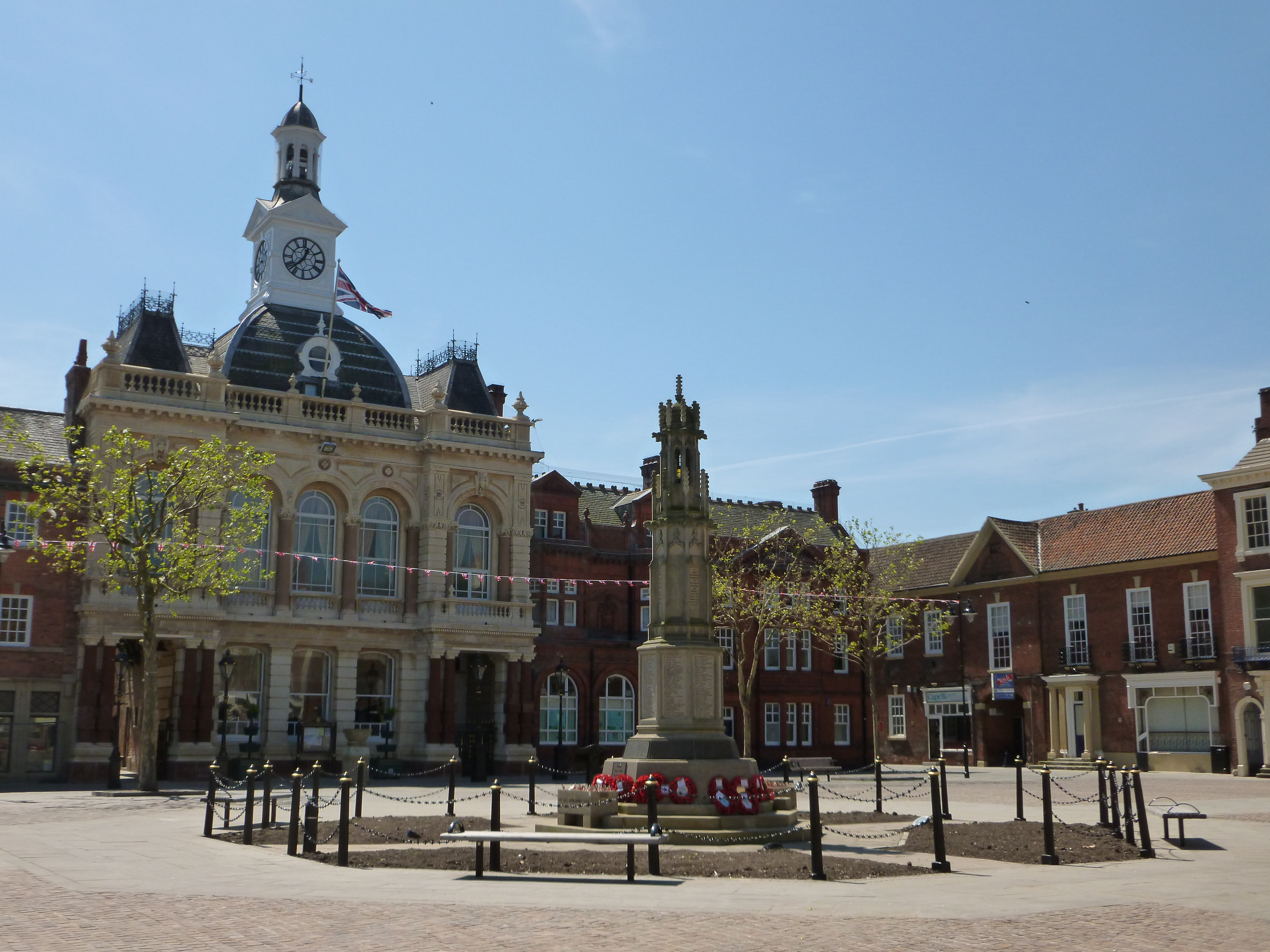
- Retford Town Hall in 2012

- Shown in Nottinghamshire
- 53.3223°N 0.9432°W
- Location: The Square, Retford

History
- Built: 1868

Site notes
- Architect: Bellamy and Hardy
- Architectural style: Italianate style

Listed Building – Grade II
- Official name: Town Hall
- Designated: 12 September 1977
- Reference no.: 1370374

Retford Town Hall is a municipal building in The Square, Retford, Nottinghamshire, England. The town hall, which was the meeting place of Retford Borough Council, is a grade II listed building. It is still used for meetings of Bassetlaw District Council.

== History ==
=== Earlier buildings ===
A moot hall was built in Retford in 1388 on a different site to the present town hall, in between the old market place and St Swithun's church, to the North of the current market place. It was a medieval timbered structure and was destroyed by the fire which devastated three-quarters of Retford in 1528.

A new moot hall was built to replace the one destroyed by fire but by August 1754 it was in danger of collapse. The corporation of East Retford decided to demolish it.

The 1528 moot hall was replaced with another building on the same site designed in the neoclassical style by Messrs White and Watson. This was completed in 1755. The design involved a symmetrical main frontage with seven bays facing onto the Market Place; the central section of three bays was pedimented and featured a clock tower. This hall provided a venue for assemblies, a court house for local and county sessions, and a shambles for the weekly market. Other markets, for example, egg and butter, were held outside on the east side, and the corn market was held in the nearby market square. The building was described by local historian John Piercy in 1828: “The roof was surmounted by a small cupola, of a very antiquated appearance, containing a bell, but no clock. This bell was rung at the commencement of the markets, and was also used for summoning the inhabitants to attend the courts, and the Council sessions, etc." Later a clock was added. The main hall was 70 ft (21 m) long and 26 ft (7.9 m) wide, and was "extremely well lighted by twelve square-headed windows". In addition to being used for the Quarter Sessions and public meetings, was "appropriated to the performance of theatrical and other amusements" according to Piercy. Another room, which was used by the grand jury at Quarter Sessions, was connected to the hall "by means of a pair of folding doors".

=== The current town hall ===
The 1755 town hall became an obstruction to traffic as The Great North Road ran through the centre of the town and the building and markets were causing congestion. In 1868 it was demolished and a new site chosen to the south of the current market place, which had previously been the site of a four-storey 18th-century townhouse. This site was purchased from Cooke's & Co Bank for £2,600 in June 1864. A condition of the sale was that a new road should also be built, which was to become Exchange Street.

A design competition took place and a budget of £6,000 was agreed. Eighteen architects submitted designs, but Bellamy and Hardy were selected. Permission was sought from the Lords Commissioners of Her Majesty's Treasury to raise a mortgage of £9,000 for the land and building costs. This was not popular with the town's inhabitants. Permission was eventually granted with a Retford resident, George Chapman, agreeing to provide the funds and local builder Thomas Hopkinson being awarded the construction tender.

The foundation stone for the new building was laid by the mayor on 19 June 1866. A time capsule with a copy of The Times newspaper and one of almost every 1866 coin was placed under the foundation stone. The Bellamy and Hardy design was in the Italianate style, in red brick with stone dressings. The design involved a symmetrical main frontage with five bays facing onto The Square; the end bays featured doorways flanked by paired Ionic order columns supporting entablatures and they had mansard roofs; there were five round headed windows with balconies forming an arcade on the first floor and a large cupola, clock and roof lantern at roof level. In 1867 T. Cooke & Sons of York transferred the clock from the old town hall into the new, and added a set of quarter bells to sound the Westminster chimes, (the latter having been funded by public subscription).

Internally, the principal rooms were the council chamber (fronting the Market Square and measuring 40 ft (12 m) by 23 ft (7.0 m)) and the ballroom (to the south, measuring 90 ft (27 m) by 40 ft (12 m)), both on the first floor and accessed by a double staircase. Immediately to the east of the council chamber was the mayor's parlour. At the rear of the ballroom, a residence was provided for the hall-keeper, and there was also a kitchen "fitted up with a Leamington range, capable of cooking a first-class dinner for 500 people". Below the ballroom was a poultry market, and additional buildings were also provided to the south for the corn exchange and shambles.

This design was controversial. The local press described the building as 'handsome and commodious' and 'replete with convenience' But the design was used as an example of the sometimes unsatisfactory results of architectural competitions by Building News (October 1867) and the facade compared unfavourably with a design submitted by Godwin & Crisp. Pevsner criticised the design saying it was "without any of the Victorian qualities we appreciate today: a bad mansard roof and a bad lantern".

The building continued to serve as a meeting place for Retford Borough Council for much of the 20th century. When the enlarged Bassetlaw District Council was formed in 1974 it established its main offices in Worksop, but continues to use the town halls in both Retford and Worksop for meetings. It is also used for concerts, wedding receptions and other events. The original design has been altered over the years. A new Mayor's Parlour was opened on the ground floor in 1935, replacing a pair of offices at the front of the building. In about 1980 the first floor was expanded into the 'Old Bank' building next door, which had been bought by Retford Borough Council in 1926 and was being used as municipal offices. The bells were replaced in 1901, and the following year a new clock was installed by John Smith of Derby. The Courthouse was replaced in the 1930s. The Shambles and Corn Exchange were demolished in the 1980s.

== Works of art ==
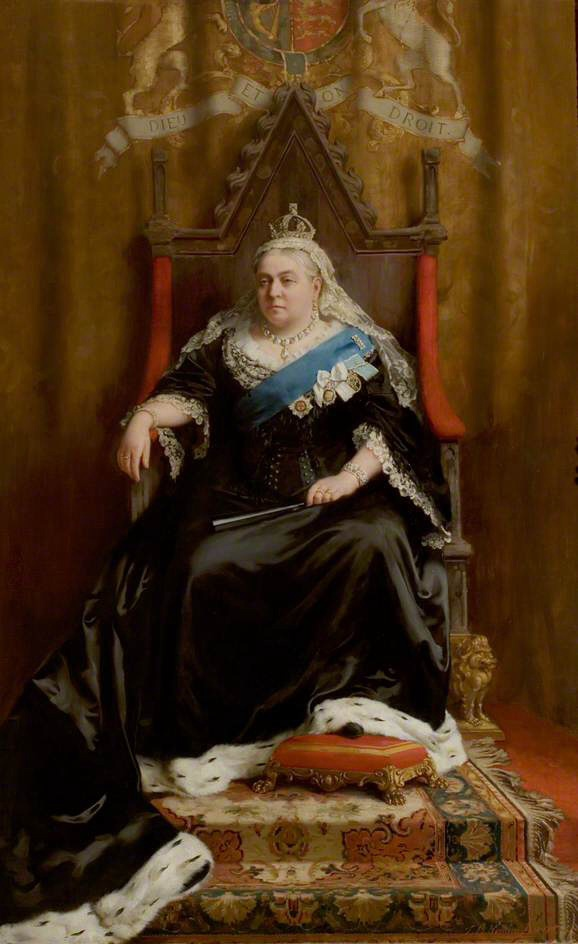

Works of art in the town hall include a portrait of Queen Victoria by Thomas Benjamin Kennington which was donated to the town by Alderman Denman to commemorate the Diamond Jubilee of Queen Victoria.

Other works of art include a portrait of Colonel Whittaker by Henry Harris Brown (1864-1948), Thomas Bescoby (1890) by Edwin Arthur Ward, JW Holmes (1919) by Frederick Hall, Thomas William Denman by Thomas Benjamin Kennington and John Smith (1868) by Hugh Ford Crighton.

== See also ==
- Listed buildings in Retford
