= Listed buildings in Hayton, Nottinghamshire =

Hayton is a civil parish in the Bassetlaw District of Nottinghamshire, England. The parish contains eleven listed buildings that are recorded in the National Heritage List for England. Of these, one is listed at Grade I, the highest of the three grades, and the others are at Grade II, the lowest grade. The parish contains the village of Hayton and the surrounding countryside. Most of the listed buildings are houses, farmhouses and farm buildings, and the others consist of a church, a war memorial in the churchyard, and two bridges over the Chesterfield Canal.

== Key ==
Grade	Criteria
I	Buildings of exceptional interest, sometimes considered to be internationally important
II	Buildings of national importance and special interest

== Buildings ==
Name and location	Photograph	Date	Notes	Grade
St Peter's Church; 53.34960°N 0.90905°W		12th century	The church has been altered and extended through the centuries. It is built in stone with roofs of slate and slabs, and consists of a nave with a clerestory, a south aisle, a south porch, a chancel, and a west tower. The tower has two stages, corner buttresses, a string course, a west window with double lancets, bell openings with two lights, a single gargoyle, and an embattled parapet. There are also embattled parapets along the nave. The porch has a parapet with four crocketed pinnacles, an embattled gable, and a doorway with a moulded surround, imposts and a hood mould. There are stone benches inside the porch, and the inner doorway, which dates from the 12th century, has a round arch with dogtooth and zigzag decoration.	I
Church Farm House, storehouse and pigeoncote 53.34919°N 0.90557°W		Late 17th century	The buildings are in brick, partly rendered, with some timber framing, and pantile roofs. The farmhouse has moulded eaves, stepped coped gables, two storeys and two bays. The doorway has a segmental head, and the windows are casements. To the left is a two-storey single-bay storehouse with a segmental relieving arch and vents, and to its left is the pigeoncote, which is taller, with a casement window, a segmental-headed doorway and four tiers of pigeonholes with shelves. At the rear is a lean-to that is timber framed with brick nogging.	II
Barn northeast of Church Farmhouse; 53.34932°N 0.90542°W		c. 1700	A threshing barn that has been concerted for residential use. It has a timber framed core enclosed in red brick, and has a hipped pantile roof. The central threshing door has been converted into doors and windows, and clerestory windows have been added under the roof. There are slit vents, and vents in diamond patterns.	II
Barn, Hall Farm House; 53.35335°N 0.90470°W	—	18th century	The barn is in brick with rebated eaves and a hipped pantile roof. There is a single storey and three bays. The barn contains a central double doorway with a segmental head, and patterned vents.	II
Hayton Castle Farm House and Cottage; 53.36766°N 0.88858°W	—	Mid 18th century	The farmhouse and cottage are in colourwashed rendered brick. The farmhouse has floor bands, and a tile roof with coped gables. There are three storeys, a double depth and L-shaped plan, with a main range of three bays, a rear wing, and a single-storey two-bay service wing. On the front is a gabled porch with a fanlight, and sash windows with segmental heads. The rear wing forms the cottage, which has dentilled eaves and a pantile roof. There are two storeys, four bays, and a two-bay addition to the east. On the front is a lean-to porch and casement windows with segmental heads.	II
The Old Vicarage; 53.35020°N 0.90718°W		Mid 18th century	The vicarage, later a private house, is in brick with a slate roof. There are two storeys, three bays, and three short gabled rear wings. On the front is a Classical doorcase with an open pediment on curving brackets, and a door with a fanlight, and the windows are sashes.	II
Clarborough Top Bridge 62; 53.34599°N 0.91011°W		1771–77	The bridge carries Smeath Lane over the Chesterfield Canal. It is in red brick with stone dressings and coping, and consists of a single elliptical arch. The bridge springs from a stone band on a brick plinth, and has pilasters and rise to piers with stone caps. The abutment walls have parapets, and end in piers with stone caps.	II
Lecture Room Bridge; 53.35355°N 0.90899°W		1774–76	This is bridge No. 64, an accommodation bridge over the Chesterfield Canal. It is in brick with squared stone coping, and consists of a single segmental arch with a towpath. There is a projecting arch ring, springing stones to the south side of the arch, and swept wings ending in piers.	II
Pigeoncote, Blyth House; 53.35800°N 0.90820°W		Late 18th century	The pigeoncote is in brick, with dentilled eaves, and a pantile roof with crow-stepped gables. There are two storeys and a single bay. On the east front and south gable end are segmental-headed doorways, and segmental-headed openings containing tiers of pigeonholes and ledges. Inside, there are wattle and daub nest boxes.	II
Hall Farm House and outbuilding 53.35332°N 0.90501°W	—	Late 18th century	The farmhouse and outbuilding are in brick, with a dentilled floor band, dentilled eaves and a hipped pantile roof. The house has two storeys, an L-shaped plan with a front range of five bays, and a single-storey single-bay lean-to on the left. The windows on the front are sashes, and at the rear is a round-headed doorway.	II
War memorial 53.34988°N 0.90906°W	—	1921	The war memorial is in the churchyard of St Peter's Church. It consists of a stone obelisk 2 metres (6 ft 7 in) high, splayed at the base to form a plinth, on a low stone base. On the lower part of the obelisk and on the front of the plinth are inscriptions and the names of those lost in the First World War.	II
