= Nora England (artist) =

British artist

- Born: Nora Ward; 1887; London, England
- Died: 1970 (aged 82–83); Hampshire
- Education: Westminster School of Art; Royal College of Art
- Known for: Painting, illustration
- Spouse: Frank De Fontayne England (m.1915)

Nora England née Ward (1887–1970) was a British artist known as a painter, designer and illustrator.

== Biography ==
England was born in London and was one of at least six children of Edwin Arthur Ward, a portrait painter, and Katherine House. England studied at the Westminster School of Art and at the Royal College of Art before studying with the society portrait painter Sir James Jebusa Shannon. Based in London, England worked in a variety of fields. She painted portraits and figure subjects, worked as an interior designer, illustrated books and magazines and also designed dresses and costumes for theatre and film productions. Among the books England illustrated was a 1923 edition of the ballads of Robert Burns. Throughout the 1920s she exhibited at the Royal Academy in London and with the Society of Women Artists. She also showed with the International Society of Sculptors, Painters and Gravers, the Royal Society of Portrait Painters and the Royal Institute of Painters in Watercolours. England was elected a member of the Royal Society of British Artists in 1920 and a member of the Society of Women Artists the following year.

England married Frank De Fontayne England in 1915 and although she lived in London throughout her life, she died in Hampshire in 1970.
