= St Michael the Archangel's Church, Retford =

St Michael the Archangel’s Church, Retford
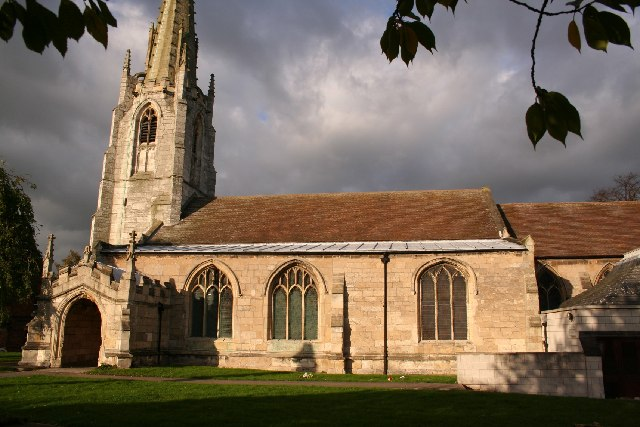
- St Michael the Archangel’s Church, Retford
- St Michael the Archangel’s Church, Retford
- 53°19′26.32″N 0°56′51.12″W
- OS grid reference: SK 70234 81313
- Location: Retford
- Country: England
- Denomination: Church of England
- Churchmanship: Anglo Catholic

History
- Dedication: St Michael the Archangel

Architecture
- Heritage designation: Grade II* listed

Administration
- Province: York
- Diocese: Southwell and Nottingham
- Archdeaconry: Newark
- Deanery: Bassetlaw & Bawtry
- Parish: Ordsall & Retford, St Michael

Clergy
- Bishop: Rt Rev Paul Williams (Bishop of Southwell and Nottingham)
- Vicar: The Reverend A Shiells
- Dean: Vacancy
- Priest: Vicar

St Michael the Archangel's Church is a Grade II* listed parish church in the Church of England in Retford, Nottinghamshire, England.

== History ==
The church dates from the 13th century. It was heavily restored in 1863. The chancel was lengthened in 1889, and a sacristy added at the north east around 1910. The church hall was added in 1978. It is also in a joint parish with All Hallows' Church in Ordsall.

== Interior ==
The chancel screen is by Charles Hodgson Fowler from 1899.

The reredos behind the altar displays a painted Adoration of the Magi, by Sir Ninian Comper.

== Organ ==
The church has a two manual pipe organ by Henry Willis dating from 1876.

== See also ==
- Grade II* listed buildings in Nottinghamshire
- Listed buildings in Retford
