= St Bartholomew's Church, Sutton-cum-Lound =

St Bartholomew’s Church, Sutton-cum-Lound
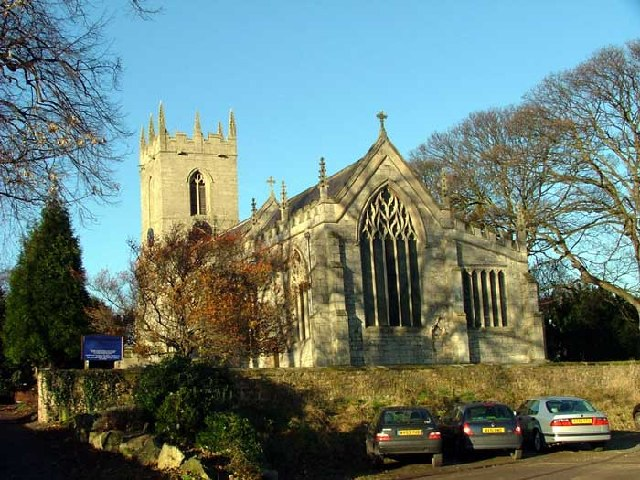
- St Bartholomew’s Church, Sutton-cum-Lound
- St Bartholomew’s Church, Sutton-cum-Lound
- 53°21′23.82″N 0°58′47.22″W
- OS grid reference: SK 68089 84975
- Location: Sutton cum Lound
- Country: England
- Denomination: Church of England

History
- Dedication: St Bartholomew

Architecture
- Heritage designation: Grade I listed

Administration
- Diocese: Southwell and Nottingham
- Archdeaconry: Newark
- Deanery: Bassetlaw and Bawtry
- Parish: Sutton cum Lound

St Bartholomew's Church, Sutton cum Lound is a Grade I listed parish church in the Church of England in Sutton cum Lound.

== History ==
The church dates from the 12th century.

It is in a joint parish with twenty nearby churches.

== Organ ==
The church has a two manual pipe organ by Brindley & Foster. A specification of the organ can be found on the National Pipe Organ Register.

== See also ==
- Grade I listed buildings in Nottinghamshire
- Listed buildings in Sutton cum Lound
