= St Saviour's Church, Retford =

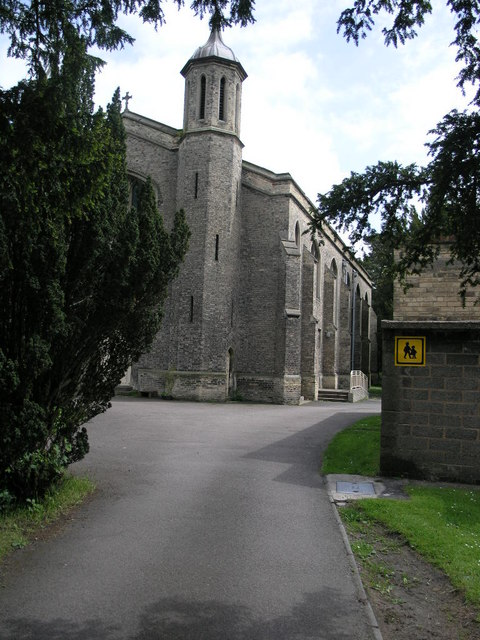
- St Saviour's Church, Retford
- St Saviour's Church, Retford
- 53°19′38.82″N 0°56′2.16″W
- OS grid reference: SK 71130 81763
- Location: Retford
- Country: England
- Denomination: Church of England
- Website: https://www.stsavioursretford.org.uk/

History
- Dedication: St Saviour
- Consecrated: 27 September 1829

Architecture
- Heritage designation: Grade II* listed
- Architect: E. J. Willson
- Groundbreaking: 2 June 1828
- Completed: 1829
- Construction cost: £4,000

Administration
- Diocese: Southwell and Nottingham
- Archdeaconry: Newark
- Deanery: Bassetlaw and Bawtry
- Parish: Retford St Saviour

St Saviour's Church, Retford is a Grade II listed parish church in the Church of England in Retford.

== History ==
The church dates from 1829. It was consecrated on 27 September 1829 by the Rt. Revd. Edward Venables-Vernon-Harcourt Archbishop of York as a daughter church of St John the Baptist Church, Clarborough, the church became a parish in its own right in 1871. It was restored in 1878. In 2002 it was united with St Swithun's and St Michael's in Retford to become a joint parish. Following further re-organisation, St. Saviour's became a single parish again in 2019 covering much of the east side of Retford.

Two stained glass memorial windows are by Charles Eamer Kempe.

== Clergy ==
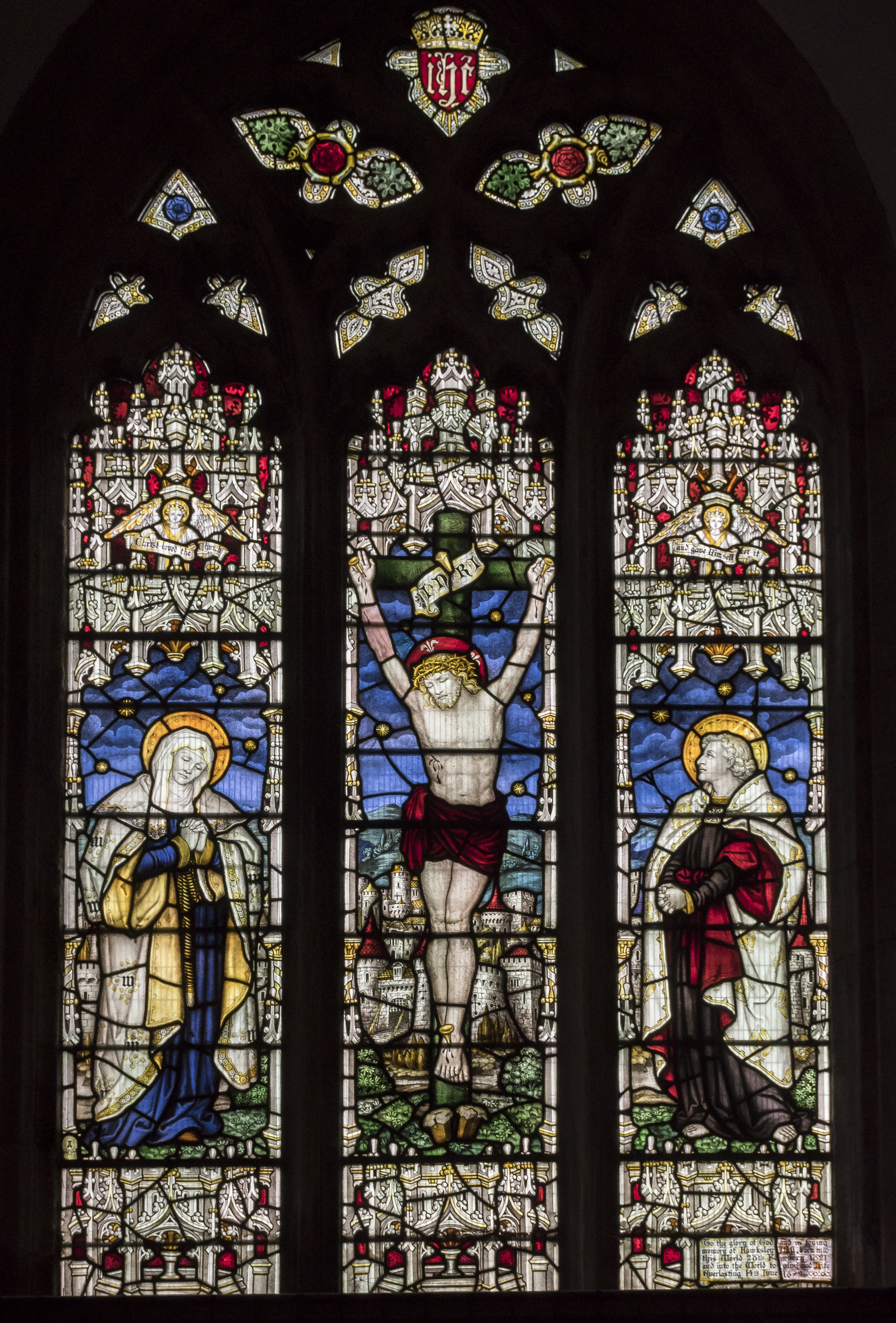
The Crucifixion; one of the windows with stained glas by C. E. Kempe, 1920

- Joshua William Brooks 1827 - 1843
- Charles Hodge 1844 - 1858
- James Disney 1860 - 1876
- Lawrence Roworth 1877 - 1913
- Edwin Paxton 1914 - 1927
- Frederic Eddy 1927 - 1930
- Edward Hester 1931 - 1933
- Lawrence Ashcroft 1934 - 1943
- James Godsmark 1943 - 1955
- Thomas Womack 1956 - 1967
- John Moore 1967 - 1973
- John Tompkins 1973 - 1987
- Tony Walker 1988 - 2017
- Ben Clayton 2018–2024

== See also ==
- Listed buildings in Retford
