= St Nicholas' Church, Askham =

Coordinates: 53°16′00″N 00°53′32″W

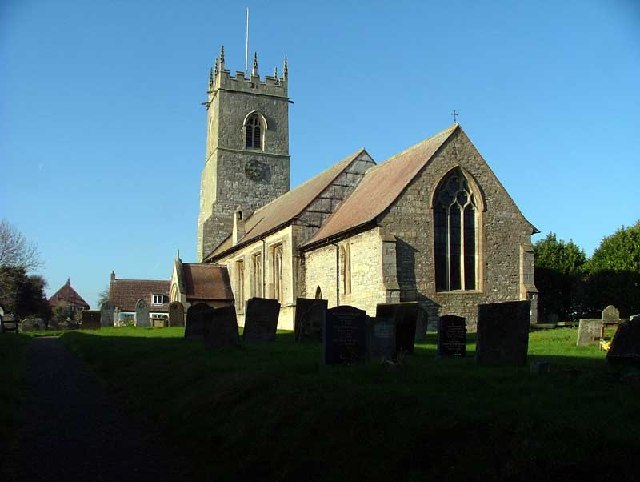
- St Nicholas' Church, Askham
- Denomination: Church of England
- Churchmanship: Broad Church

History
- Dedication: St Nicholas

Administration
- Province: York
- Diocese: Southwell and Nottingham
- Deanery: Bassetlaw & Bawtry
- Parish: Askham, Nottinghamshire

Clergy
- Vicar: Rev J Jesson

St Nicholas' Church, Askham is a parish church in the Church of England in Askham, Nottinghamshire.

The church is Grade II* listed by the Department for Digital, Culture, Media and Sport as it is a particularly significant building of more than local interest.

== History ==
The church is medieval, the south nave being 12th century but was restored in 1906 to 1907.

== Parish structure ==
The church is in a group of parishes which includes

- St Nicholas' Church, Askham
- St Helen's Church, Grove
- Church of St John the Baptist, East Markham
- St Peter's Church, Headon-cum-Upton

== Bells ==
The church has 3 bells which are hung dead on a steel frame with hammers.

== See also ==
- Grade II* listed buildings in Nottinghamshire
- Listed buildings in Askham, Nottinghamshire
