= St Peter's Church, Hayton =

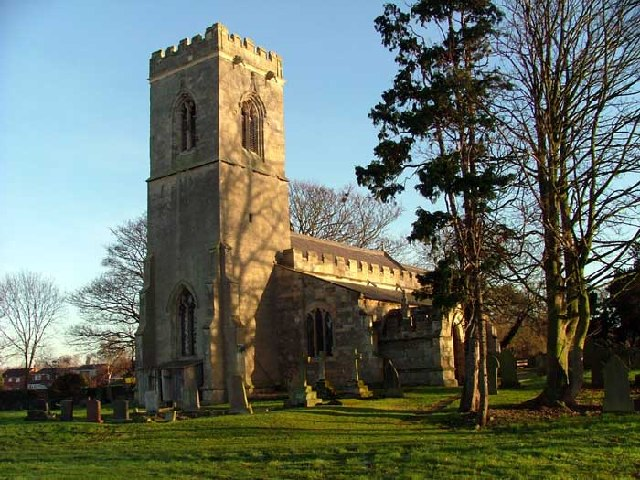
- St Peter's Church, Hayton
- St Peter's Church, Hayton
- 53°20′55.69″N 0°54′33.71″W
- OS grid reference: SK 72719 84183
- Location: Hayton, Nottinghamshire
- Country: England
- Denomination: Church of England

History
- Dedication: St Peter

Architecture
- Heritage designation: Grade I listed

Administration
- Province: York
- Diocese: Southwell and Nottingham
- Archdeaconry: Newark
- Deanery: Bassetlaw and Bawtry
- Parish: Hayton

Clergy
- Bishop: Rt Rev Porter (Bishop of Sherwood)
- Vicar: Rev M Cantrill (Team Vicar)
- Dean: Vacancy

St Peter's Church, Hayton is a Grade I listed parish church in the Church of England in Hayton, Nottinghamshire.

== History ==
The church dates from the 12th century, with restoration in the 19th century.

== See also ==
- Grade I listed buildings in Nottinghamshire
- Listed buildings in Hayton, Nottinghamshire
