= Diocese of Southwell and Nottingham =

Diocese of the Church of England

Coordinates: 53.0769°N 0.9543°W

Diocese of Southwell and Nottingham Dioecesis Southwellensis et Nottinghamensis
- Coat of arms

- Flag

Location
- Country: England
- Ecclesiastical province: York
- Archdeaconries: Newark, Nottingham
- Headquarters: Southwell

Statistics
- Parishes: 266
- Churches: 313

Information
- Denomination: Church of England
- Established: 5 February 1884
- Cathedral: Southwell Minster

Current leadership
- Bishop: Paul Williams, Bishop of Southwell & Nottingham
- Suffragan: Andy Emerton, Bishop of Sherwood
- Archdeacons: Phil Williams, Archdeacon of Nottingham; Tors Ramsey, Archdeacon of Newark

Website
- southwell.anglican.org

The Diocese of Southwell and Nottingham is a Church of England diocese in the Province of York, headed by the Bishop of Southwell and Nottingham. It covers all the English county of Nottinghamshire and a few parishes in South Yorkshire. It is bordered by the dioceses of Derby, Leicester, Lincoln and Sheffield. The cathedral, Southwell Minster, is in the town of Southwell, 15 miles (24 km) north of Nottingham.

== History ==
The present territory of the diocese was originally the Archdeaconry of Nottingham in the Diocese of York. In 1540, a new diocese was proposed by King Henry VIII comprising Nottinghamshire and Derbyshire, and the collegiate church of Southwell Minster was suppressed in order to serve as cathedral for the new diocese. However, this did not come to pass, and the collegiate church was reconstituted in 1543, while the archdeaconry remained part of the Diocese of York.

In 1837, the Archdeaconry of Nottingham was transferred to the Diocese of Lincoln, and therefore from the Province of York to the Province of Canterbury.

On 5 February 1884, the diocese of Southwell was created from the Archdeaconry of Nottingham, taken from Lincoln, and the Archdeaconry of Derby (covering, roughly, Derbyshire), taken from the Diocese of Lichfield. As had been planned in 1540, the medieval collegiate church of Southwell Minster was designated as cathedral for the new diocese.

On 7 July 1927, the Diocese of Derby was separated from Southwell; and on 25 October 1935, under to the Diocese of Southwell (Transfer) Measure, 1935, the Diocese of Southwell was transferred back to the province of York.

In February 2005 the diocesan synod requested a change of name to the Diocese of Southwell and Nottingham, which was approved by the General Synod of the Church of England in July and by the Privy Council on 15 November 2005.

== Bishops ==
The diocesan bishop is Paul Williams, assisted by Andy Emerton, the Bishop suffragan of Sherwood, whose See of Sherwood was created in 1965. Alternative episcopal oversight (for the few parishes in the diocese which do not receive the ministry of priests who are women) is provided by a provincial episcopal visitor (PEV), the Bishop suffragan of Beverley, Stephen Race. He is licensed as an honorary assistant bishop of the diocese.

Today the bishop's residence and office, the diocesan offices and the cathedral all remain in Southwell.

== Archdeaconries and deaneries ==
Diocese	Archdeaconries	Rural Deaneries
Diocese of Southwell & Nottingham	Archdeaconry of Nottingham	Deanery of East Bingham
Diocese of Southwell & Nottingham	Archdeaconry of Nottingham	Deanery of Gedling
Diocese of Southwell & Nottingham	Archdeaconry of Nottingham	Deanery of Nottingham North
Diocese of Southwell & Nottingham	Archdeaconry of Nottingham	Deanery of Nottingham South
Diocese of Southwell & Nottingham	Archdeaconry of Nottingham	Deanery of West Bingham
Diocese of Southwell & Nottingham	Archdeaconry of Newark	Deanery of Bassetlaw and Bawtry
Diocese of Southwell & Nottingham	Archdeaconry of Newark	Deanery of Mansfield
Diocese of Southwell & Nottingham	Archdeaconry of Newark	Deanery of Newark and Southwell
Diocese of Southwell & Nottingham	Archdeaconry of Newark	Deanery of Newstead

== List of churches in the diocese ==
Closed churches are listed in italics.

Place	Church	Opened	Closed
Annesley	All Saints	1874	
Annesley	All Saints Old Church		1940s
Annesley Woodhouse	St John the Evangelist		
Arnold	St Mary, Church Lane		
Arnold	Emmanuel, Church View Close, Warren Hill		
Askham	St Nicholas		
Aslockton	St Thomas	1892	
Aspley	St Margaret, Aspley Lane	1936	
Attenborough	St Mary the Virgin, Church Lane		
Auckley	St Saviour		
Austerfield	St Helena, High Street		
Averham	St Michael and All Angels		
Awsworth	St Peter, Main Street		
Babworth	All Saints, Private Lane		
Balderton	St Giles		
Barnby in the Willows	All Saints		
Barnstone	St Mary	1857	
Barton in Fabis	St George		
Basford	St Aidan	1905	
Basford	St Augustine	1877	1989
Basford	St Leodegarius		
Bawtry	St Nicholas, Church Street		
Beckingham	All Saints, Church Street		
Beeston	St John the Baptist, Church Street		
Besthorpe	Holy Trinity	1844	
Bestwood	St Matthew-on-the-Hill, Padstow Road, Bestwood Estate		
Bestwood	St Mark, School Walk, Bestwood Village		
Bestwood	Rise Park Church-Ang/Meth LEP, Revelstoke Way		
Bestwood	Park Church Ang/Meth LEP		
Bestwood	St Philip, Knight's Close Top Valley		
Bilborough	St Martin of Tours, St Martin's Road		
Bilborough	St John the Baptist, Graylands Road		
Bilsthorpe	St Margaret, Church Hill		
Bingham	St Mary and All Saints, Church Street		
Bleasby	St Mary		
Blidworth	St Mary of the Purification, Main Street		
Blyth	St Mary and St Martin		
Bole	St Martin, East Street		
Bothamsall	Our Lady and St Peter	1845	
Boughton	St Matthew, Church Road	1868	
Bradmore	Church Room, Main Street		
Bramcote	St Michael and All Angels, Church Street	1861	
Brinsley	St James the Great, Church Lane		
Broughton Sulney (Upper Broughton)	St Luke, Melton Road		
Broxtowe	St Martha the Housewife		
Bulcote	Holy Trinity	1862	
Bulwell	St John the Divine, Keys Close/Muster Walk	1885	
Bulwell	St Mary the Virgin, Highbury Road		
Bunny	St Mary the Virgin, Church Street		
Burton Joyce	St Helen, Church Road		
Calverton	St Wilfrid		
Car Colston	St Mary, Main Street		
Carburton	St Giles		
Carlton	St John the Baptist, Oakdale Road		
Carlton	St Paul	1891	
Carlton-in-Lindrick	St John the Evangelist, Church Lane		
Carlton-on-Trent	St Mary	1851	
Carrington	St John the Evangelist, Mansfield Road	1843	
Caunton	St Andrew		
Caythorpe	St Aidan Mission Church	1900	
Chilwell	Christ Church, High Road	1903	
Church Warsop	St Peter and St Paul		
Cinderhill	Christ Church, Nuthall Road	1856	
Clarborough	St John the Baptist, Church Lane		
Clayworth	St Peter, Wiseton Road		
Clifton	Holy Trinity, Farnborough Road		
Clifton	St Francis, South Church Drive		
Clifton Village	St Mary, Holgate		
Clipstone	All Saints, Fourth Avenue		
Clumber Park	St Mary the Virgin	1867	
Collingham	All Saints		
Collingham	St John the Baptist		
Colston Bassett	St John the Divine	1892	
Colwick	St John the Baptist		
Cossall	St Catherine		
Costock	St Giles, Church Lane		
Cotgrave	All Saints		
Cotham	St Michael		
Cottam	Holy Trinity		
Cromwell	St Giles		
Cropwell Bishop	St Giles		
Darlton	St Giles		
Daybrook	St Paul, Mansfield Road North	1896	
Daybrook	St Timothy's Church Centre		
Dunham-on-Trent	St Oswald, The Green		
Eakring	St Andrew, Kirklington Road		
East Bridgford	St Peter, Kirk Hill		
East Drayton	St Peter		
East Leake	St Mary, Main Street		
East Markham	St John the Baptist, Church Street		
East Retford	St Swithun		
East Stoke	St Oswald		
Eastwood	St Mary		
Eaton	All Saints	1860	
Edingley	St Giles		
Edwalton	Holy Rood		
Edwinstowe	St Mary		
Egmanton	Our Lady of Egmanton		
Elkesley	St Giles		
Elston	All Saints		
Elton on the Hill	St Michael and All Angels		
Epperstone	Holy Cross		
Everton	Holy Trinity, Church Street		
Farndon	St Peter, Church Street		
Farnsfield	St Michael	1860	
Finningley	Holy Trinity and St Oswald, Rectory Lane		
Flawborough	St Peter		2009
Flawford	St Peter's Church, Flawford		1718
Fledborough	St Gregory's Church, Fledborough		
Flintham	St Augustine of Canterbury		
Forest Town	St Alban, Clipstone Road West	1911	
Gamston	St Peter		
Gamston and Bridgford	St Luke, Leahurst Road		
Gedling	All Hallows		
Girton and Spalford	St Cecilia		
Gonalston	St Laurence		
Gotham	St Lawrence		
Granby	All Saints		
Greasley	St Mary		
Gringley-on-the-Hill	St Peter and St Paul		
Grove	St Helen	1882	
Gunthorpe	St John the Baptist		
Halam	St Michael the Archangel		
Halloughton	St James		
Harby with Swinethorpe	All Saints	1877	
Harworth	All Saints		
Hawksworth	St Mary and All Saints		
Hawton	All Saints		
Hayton	St Peter, Church Lane		
Headon-cum-Upton	St Peter		
Hickling	St Luke, Main Street		
Hockerton	St Nicholas		
Holbeck | St Winifred (Private Chapel)	1916		
Holme	St Giles		
Holme Pierrepont with Adbolton	St Edmund		
Hoveringham	St Michael		
Hucknall	St John, Nottingham Road	1877	
Hucknall	St Peter and St Paul, Ruffs Drive	1956	
Hucknall	St Mary Magdalene, Market Place		
Huthwaite	All Saints, Common Road	1903	
Hyson Green	St Paul	1844	1994
Hyson Green	St Stephen, Bobbers Mill Road	1898	
Inham Nook (Chilwell)	St Barnabas, Barn Croft	1957	
Jacksdale	St Mary, Church Lane		
Kelham	St Wilfrid		
Keyworth	St Mary Magdalene		
Kilvington	St Mary		
Kimberley	Holy Trinity, Church Hill		
Kingston on Soar	St Winifred, Kegworth Road		
Kinoulton	St Luke, Main Street	1793	
Kirkby Woodhouse	St John the Evangelist, Skegby Road		
Kirkby-in-Ashfield	St Thomas, Kingsway	1903	
Kirkby-in-Ashfield	St Wilfrid, Church Street	1907	
Kirklington	St Swithin		
Kirton	Holy Trinity		
Kneesall	St Bartholomew		
Kneeton	St Helen		
Lady Bay	All Hallows, Pierrepont Road		
Ladybrook (Mansfield)	St Mary the Virgin, Bancroft Lane		
Lambley	Holy Trinity		
Laneham	St Peter		
Langar cum Barnstone	St Andrew		
Langford	St Bartholomew		
Langold	St Luke, Church Street	1928	
Laxton	St Michael the Archangel		
Lenton	Holy Trinity, Church Street	1842	
Lenton	Priory Church of St Anthony, Abbey Street, Old Lenton		
Lenton Abbey	St Barnabas' Church, Lenton Abbey	1938	
Linby	St Michael, Church Lane		
Lowdham	St Mary the Virgin		
Mansfield	St Augustine, Abbott Road		
Mansfield	St John's, St John Street	1856	
Mansfield	St Lawrence, Skerry Hill/Pecks Hill		
Mansfield	St Mark, Nottingham Road	1897	
Mansfield	St Peter and St Paul, Church Side		
Mansfield Woodhouse	St Edmund King and Martyr, Church Street		
Maplebeck	St Radegund		
Markham Clinton (West Markham)	All Saints		
Mattersey	All Saints, Retford Road		
Misson	St John the Baptist, Church Street		
Misterton	All Saints, High Street		
Moorhouse	Moorhouse Chantry Chapel	1860	
Morton	St Denis	1756	
Netherfield	St George, Victoria Road		
New Basford	St Augustine, Gawthorne Street, Sherwood Rise		
Newark-on-Trent	St Mary Magdalene, Market Square		
Newark-on-Trent	Christ Church, Boundary Road	1956	
Newark-on-Trent	St Leonard, Lincoln Road	1978	
Newstead Abbey	St Mary		
Newstead	St Mary the Virgin, Village Street		
Normanton on Soar	St James		
Normanton-upon-Trent	St Matthew, Main Street		
North and South Wheatley	St Helen's		1883
North and South Wheatley	St Peter and St Paul, Middlefield Road		
North Leverton	St Martin, Main Street		
North Muskham	St Wilfrid		
Norton and Cuckney	St Mary		
Norwell	St Laurence		
Nottingham	All Saints, Raleigh Street	1864	
Nottingham	Emmanuel Church, Woodborough Road	1883	1972
Nottingham	Holy Trinity Church, Trinity Square	1841	1958
Nottingham	St Andrew, Mansfield Rd/Mapperley Rd	1871	
Nottingham	St Ann's Church, St Ann's Well Road	1864	1971
Nottingham	St Ann with Emmanuel, Robin Hood Chase/Church Rd	1974	
Nottingham	St Bartholomew's Church, Blue Bell Hill Road	1894	1971
Nottingham	St Catharine, St Ann's Well Road	1896	2003
Nottingham	St George, The Meadows	1888	
Nottingham	St Faith's Church, Bathley Street, Nottingham	1915	1981
Nottingham	St James' Church, Standard Hill	1809	1933
Nottingham	St John the Baptist, Canal Street	1844	1941
Nottingham	St Jude, Woodborough Rd	1877	
Nottingham	St Luke's Church, Carlton Road	1863	1924
Nottingham	St Mark's Church, Huntingdon Street	1856	1958
Nottingham	St Mary the Virgin, High Pavement		
Nottingham	St Matthew's Church, Talbot Street	1853	1956
Nottingham	St Nicholas, Maid Marian Way	1678	
Nottingham	St Paul's Church, George Street	1822	1924
Nottingham	St Peter with St James, St Peter's Gate		
Nottingham	St Philip's Church, Pennyfoot Street	1879	1963
Nottingham	St Saviour, St Saviour's Garden, The Meadows	1864	
Nottingham	St Stephen's Church, Bunker's Hill	1859	1896
Nottingham	St Thomas's Church, Nottingham	1873	1926
Nuthall	St Patrick, Kimberley Road		
Oldcotes	St Mark, Maltby Road	1900	
Ollerton	St Giles	1790	
Ollerton	St Paulinus, Church Circle		
Ordsall	All Hallows, Church Lane		
Orston	St Mary		
Ossington	Holy Rood		
Owthorpe	St Margaret		
Oxton	St Peter & St Paul, Main Street		
Papplewick	St James, Off Main Street		
Perlethorpe	St John the Evangelist		
Pleasley Hill	St Barnabas, Bagshaw Street		
Pleasley Vale	St Chad		
Plumtree	St Mary, Church Hill, Old Melton Rd		
Porchester	St James, Marshall Hill Drive, Mapperley		
Radcliffe-on-Trent	St Mary, Main Road	1880	
Radford	All Souls, Ilkeston Road		
Radford	Christchurch, Ilkeston Road	1847	1950
Radford	St Michael and All Angels, Hartley Road/Alfreton Road	1889	1975
Radford	St Peter, Churchfield Lane/Hartley Rd	1812	
Rainworth	St Simon and St Jude		
Rampton	All Saints, Torksey Street		
Ranby	St Martin, Blyth Road, Chapel of Ease		
Ranskill	St Barnabas, North Road		
Ratcliffe-on-Soar	Holy Trinity, Kingston Park		
Ravenshead	St Peter, Sheepwalk Lane		
Rempstone	All Saints, Ashby Road	1773	
Rempstone	St Peter in the Rushes	Medieval	1770
Retford	St Alban, London Road		
Retford	St Saviour, Welham Road	1829	
Rolleston	Holy Trinity		
Ruddington	St Peter Church Street	1888	
Scarrington	St John of Beverley		
Scofton	St John		
Screveton	St Wilfrid, Rectory Lane		
Scrooby	St Wilfrid, Low Road		
Selston	St Helen, Church Lane		
Shelford	St Peter and St Paul, Church Street		
Shelton	St Mary and All Saints, Main Street		
Sherwood	St Martin, Trevose Gardens	1932	
Shireoaks	St Luke, Shireoaks Road		
Sibthorpe	St Peter, Church Street		
Skegby	St Andrew, Mansfield Road		
Sneinton	St Alban's Church, Sneinton, Bond Street	1887	2003
Sneinton	St Christopher's Church, Sneinton	1910	
Sneinton	St Cyprian, Lancaster Road	1935	
Sneinton	St Matthias' Church, St Matthias Road	1868	2007
Sneinton	St Stephen		
Sookholme	St Augustine		
South Clifton	St George the Martyr		
South Leverton	All Saints, Church Street		
South Muskham	St Wilfrid		
South Scarle	St Helena		
Southwell	Holy Trinity, Westgate	1846	
Southwell	Cathedral & Parish Church of the Blessed Virgin Mary		
Stanford on Soar	St John the Baptist, Main Street		
Stanton on the Hill	All Saints (Chapel of Ease) Fackley Road		
Stanton-on-the-Wolds	All Saints, Brown's Lane		
Stapleford	St Helen, Church Street		
Stapleford	St Andrew, Antill Street		To be converted into flats, previously the Haven Church
Stapleford	St Luke Mission Church, Moorbridge Lane		
Staunton	St Mary		
Stoke Bardolph	St Luke	1844	
Stokeham	St Peter		
Strelley	All Saints, Main Street		
Sturton le Steeple	St Peter & St Paul, Church Street		
Sutton Bonington	St Anne, St Anne's Lane, Sutton		
Sutton Bonington	St Michael, Main Street, Bonington		
Sutton cum Lound	St Bartholomew, Mattersey Road		
Sutton-in-Ashfield	St Mary Magdalene, Lammas Road		
Sutton-in-Ashfield	St Michael and All Angels, Outram Street		
Sutton-on-Trent	All Saints, Church Street		
Syerston	All Saints		
Teversal	St Katherine, Buttery Lane		
Thorney with Wigsley	St Helen		
Thoroton	St Helena		
Thorpe	St Lawrence		
Thrumpton	All Saints		
Thurgarton	Priory Church of St Peter, Thurgarton		
Tollerton	St Peter, Tollerton Lane		
Toton	St Peter, High Road		
Treswell	St John the Baptist		
Trowell	St Helen, Nottingham Road		
Tuxford	St Nicholas		
Tythby with Cropwell Butler	Holy Trinity		
Underwood	St Michael and All Angels, Church Lane	1890	
Upton	St Peter & St Paul, Church Lane		
Walesby	St Edmund		
Walkeringham	St Mary Magdalene, Gringley Road		
Warsop	see Church Warsop and Sookholme		
Welbeck	College Chapel		
Wellow	St Swithin		
West Bridgford	St Giles, Church Drive		
West Drayton	St Paul		
West Leake	St Helena, Main Street		
West Retford	St Michael the Archangel		
West Stockwith	St Mary the Blessed Virgin, Main Street	1722	
Weston	All Saints		
Westwood	St Mary, Church Lane, Jacksdale	1898	
Whatton	St John of Beverley		
Widmerpool	St Peter, Old Hall Drive		
Wilford	St Wilfrid		
Wilford Hill	St Paul, Boundary Road		
Willoughby-on-the-Wolds	St Mary & All Saints, Church Lane		
Winkburn	St John of Jerusalem		
Winthorpe	All Saints	1888	
Wollaton	St Leonard, Wollaton Road		
Wollaton Park	St Mary	1939	
Woodborough	St Swithun, Lingwood Lane		
Woodthorpe	St Mark, De Vere Gardens		
Worksop	Christchurch Centre, Thievesdale Close		
Worksop	St Anne, Newcastle Avenue	1911	
Worksop	St John the Evangelist, Gateford Road	1869	
Worksop	St Paul, Pelham Street		
Worksop	Worksop Priory (St Mary & St Cuthbert, Priorswell Road)		
Wysall	Holy Trinity, Main Street		

== See also ==
- Archdeacon of Nottingham
- Anglican Bishop of Nottingham
