= Listed buildings in Kirkby-in-Ashfield =

Kirkby-in-Ashfield is a market town in the Ashfield district of Nottinghamshire, England. The town and its surrounding area contain 18 listed buildings that are recorded in the National Heritage List for England. All the listed buildings are designated at Grade II, the lowest of the three grades, which is applied to "buildings of national importance and special interest". Most of the listed buildings consist of houses, farmhouses, farm buildings and associated structures. The other listed buildings are a village cross, a pinfold, a well head, a church, a war memorial and a telephone kiosk.

== Buildings ==
Name and location	Photograph	Date	Notes
Kirkby Cross; 53.10109°N 1.26962°W		14th century	The village cross is in stone and has a base of three steps. On this is a restored square plinth, and a tapered square shaft with a shaped top.
The Croft; 53.09937°N 1.26930°W		16th century	The house, which was rebuilt in the 18th century and altered in the 20th century, is rendered and has a pantile roof. There are two storeys and three bays. On the front is a lean-to porch, and the windows are a mix of casements and sashes, including one horizontally-sliding sash.
The Old Rectory; 53.09769°N 1.26867°W		1717	The rectory is in red brick, partly rendered, on a chamfered plinth, with stone dressings, a floor band, an eaves band, modillion wood and chamfered stone eaves, and a slate roof with coped gables. There are two storeys and attics, and an L-shaped plan, with a front of five bays, and a two-storey rear wing. The central doorway has a semicircular fanlight, and a hood on scroll brackets, the windows on the front are sashes, elsewhere are casement windows, and in the roof are three pedimented dormers, the middle pediment segmental.
Pinfold; 53.09712°N 1.27038°W		c. 1740	The pinfold is in stone, and consists of four walls with gabled coping enclosing an approximately square area with sides of about 5 metres (16 ft). In the east side is a wooden gate with a plaque.
Former Post Office; 53.09892°N 1.27001°W		Mid 18th century	The house, at one time a post office, is in stone with quoins and a slate roof. There are two storeys, three bays, and a single-storey extension on the left. The doorway has a lintel with an illegible date, and the windows are mullioned with two or three lights.
Prospect Farmhouse and walls 53.08430°N 1.26576°W		Mid 18th century	The farmhouse is in stone and brick, partly rendered, with slate roofs. There are two storeys and attics, and an L-shaped plan, with a front of three bays. On the south front is a gabled porch with a segmental-headed doorway, and most of the windows are sashes. Adjoining the house are coped yard walls.
2 and 6 Church Street and stable 53.10093°N 1.26978°W		c.1775	A farmhouse, later divided, in stone, on a plinth, with a tile roof, hipped at the right. There are two storeys, an L-shaped plan, and a front of three bays. On the front is a doorway and windows, which are a mix of sashes and casements.
20 Chapel Street; 53.10100°N 1.26781°W		Late 18th century	A farmhouse, later a private house, in stone with a slate roof. There are two storeys, and three bays, and a single-storey lean-to on the right. Most of the windows are sashes.
Stable adjoining 20 Chapel Street; 53.10111°N 1.26773°W	—	Late 18th century	The stable to the northeast of the farmhouse is in stone and brick with a pantile roof. There are two storeys and two bays. The openings include a stable door and a doorway, and above is a blocked opening.
Stable range east of 20 Chapel Street; 53.10107°N 1.26742°W		Late 18th century	The stable range, later used for other purposes, is in stone and brick with a pantile roof. There is a single storey and five unequal bays. The range contains stable and garage doors and casement windows; most of the openings have stone lintels.
Wall west of 20 Chapel Street; 53.10104°N 1.26822°W	—	Late 18th century	The wall enclosing the garden to the west of the house is in stone with half-round coping. It has an L-shaped plan, and extends for about 25 metres (82 ft).
Chapel Street Farmhouse and cottage 53.10094°N 1.26670°W		Late 18th century	The farmhouse is in stone with a slate roof. There are two storeys and attics, and an L-shaped plan, with a front range of three bays, and a rear two-storey two-bay rear wing. The doorway has a rectangular fanlight, the windows on the front are sashes, and elsewhere they are casements. On the right is a lower two-storey service wing, and then at right angles, a cottage in stone and red brick with casement windows.
Barn and stables, Chapel Street Farm; 53.10115°N 1.26644°W	—	Late 18th century	The barn and stables are in stone and brick, and have pantile roofs. They are in one and two storeys and have an L-shaped plan, with ranges of seven and four bays. The barn contains casement windows and doors, and has an external flight of brick and stone steps, and the stable has four doors alternating with casement windows.
Walls, Chapel Street Farm; 53.10086°N 1.26674°W	—	Late 18th century	The walls enclosing the farmyard and the garden are in stone with half-round coping. They extend for about 30 metres (98 ft) and contain two gate openings.
Well head 53.09944°N 1.26931°W	—	Late 18th century	The well head, adjacent to The Croft, consists of a stone slab with round hole, flanked by a rectangular enclosure of three slabs, and with a slab top. There are the remains of an iron crank with a wooden barrel.
St Wilfrid's Church, Kirkby-in-Ashfield; 53.09752°N 1.26929°W		1863–67	The oldest part of the church is the steeple, the rest of the church being rebuilt by Louis Ambler following a fire in 1907. The church, which incorporate some medieval fabric, is in stone with slate roofs. It consists of a nave, north and south aisles, a north porch, a chancel, a vestry and a west steeple. The steeple has a tower with three stages, clasping buttresses, a moulded plinth, two string courses, a clock face, a dentilled eaves band, and a broach spire with lucarnes and a weathercock.
War Memorial and wall, Kirkby-in-Ashfield; 53.09360°N 1.24271°W		c. 1920	The war memorial at the entrance to the cemetery is in granite. It consists of a cross-pedimented rectangular column with a cornice, on a coved plinth, on a base of three square steps. On each side of the column are inscriptions, and on the north and south sides are projecting panels with hipped tops and scroll bases. The war memorial is enclosed on four sides by a dwarf stone wall with chamfered coping. It contains concrete piers with octagonal capitals, and patterned railings and a gate in wrought iron.
Telephone kiosk, Kirkby-in-Ashfield; 53.10092°N 1.26739°W		1935	The K6 type telephone kiosk in Chapel Street was designed by Giles Gilbert Scott. Constructed in cast iron with a square plan and a dome, it has three unperforated crowns in the top panels.
