= Listed buildings in West Drayton, Nottinghamshire =

West Drayton is a civil parish in the Bassetlaw District of Nottinghamshire, England. The parish contains 13 listed buildings that are recorded in the National Heritage List for England. Of these, one is listed at Grade II*, the middle of the three grades, and the others are at Grade II, the lowest grade. The parish contains the villages of West Drayton, Markham Moor and Rockley, and the surrounding countryside. Most of the listed buildings are houses, a cottage, farmhouses, and associated structures, and the others are a church, a road bridge, a water mill, a public house, a milestone, and the canopy of a former petrol station.

== Key ==
Grade	Criteria
II*	Particularly important buildings of more than special interest
II	Buildings of national importance and special interest

== Buildings ==
Name and location	Photograph	Date	Notes	Grade
St Paul's Church; 53.26498°N 0.93522°W		12th century	The church has been altered through the centuries, including a restoration in 1874. It is built in stone, partly rendered, and has tile roofs. The church consists of a nave and a chancel under a continuous roof, and a north vestry. On the west gable is a two-arched bellcote, and in the south wall is a doorway containing Norman masonry, including scalloped moulding and zigzag decoration, and to its right is an arched stoup.	II*
Eel Pie Bridge; 53.26020°N 0.93319°W		Early 17th century	The bridge, which has been altered, carries Old London Road over the River Maun. It consists of two stone triangular arches with a cutwater. On each side are later stone walls and piers. Above the arches is a blue brick band, set into which are concrete girders and piers carrying a concrete parapet. Between the piers are cast iron railings ending in stone piers.	II
Pigeoncote, stable, outbuildings and wall, Markham Moor House; 53.25883°N 0.92945°W	—	Mid 18th century	The buildings are constructed from painted brick with pantile roofs. The pigeoncote has two storeys and a loft, and a single bay on a plinth. It has a floor band, dogtooth eaves, and brick coped gables, and contains openings with segmental heads and a blocked round window in the loft. To its left is a single-storey three-bay stable block containing a stable door and other openings under segmental arches. Further to the left are single-storey outbuildings with ten bays, which have been converted for residential use, projecting from which is a red brick wall with shaped coping and three coped piers, extending for 7 metres (23 ft).	II
Manor Farmhouse; 53.26358°N 0.93908°W		Late 18th century	The farmhouse was constructed in red brick, with a dogtooth, raised and dentilled eaves band, and a pantile roof with brick-coped gables and kneelers. It has two storeys with an attic and an L-shaped plan, comprising a front range of four bays and a two-bay rear wing. The windows are casements with mullions and splayed lintels with keystones.	II
Markham Moor House; 53.25901°N 0.92910°W		Late 18th century	The house is in red brick with dentilled eaves and a hipped pantile roof. There are three storeys and three bays, a later recessed two-storey two-bay wing on the left, and at the rear is a two-storey wing of an earlier build. In the centre is a doorway with a traceried fanlight, a fluted and dentilled frieze, and a pediment. Canted bay windows flank this with simple entablatures, and in the upper floors are sash windows with segmental heads. The wing has a square bay window and casement windows on the upper floor.	II
Ice house at Rockley House; 53.26542°N 0.93187°W	—	Late 18th century	The ice house is constructed of red brick with dentilled eaves and a pantile roof. Steps lead down to a doorway with a moulded surround, and to another doorway with a depressed arch. The interior has a barrel roof and contains three arched niches.	II
The Old Water Mill; 53.26476°N 0.93241°W	—	Late 18th century	The water mill is built over the River Maun. It is in red brick on a stone platform and has pantile roofs. There are two storeys and attics, a three-bay wing, a single-storey single-bay lean-to, and a later two-bay wing. The lean-to contains an iron waterwheel, and under the latter wing are two arches, the right being a water channel with a sluice. In front, and over the river, is an embattled parapet with a central cutwater, and cantilevered out from the south front is a wooden footbridge.	II
Markham Moor Inn and cottage 53.25743°N 0.92565°W		Early 19th century	The public house is stuccoed, partly on a plinth, with a hipped pantile roof. There are three storeys and four bays, and a single-storey single-bay extension on the right. The doorway has a fanlight in a moulded surround, canted bay windows flank it, and the other windows are sashes. Recessed on the left is the stuccoed cottage, on a plinth, with an eaves band, two storeys and three bays. The central doorway has a fanlight under a segmental arch, flanked by sash windows under segmental arches, and on the upper floor are casement windows.	II
Milestone; 53.25824°N 0.92705°W		Early 19th century	The milestone is 2.5 metres (8 ft 2 in) high. It has an octagonal base, a cylindrical plinth and a cylindrical shaft, with a band at the top and a round moulded cap.	II
Rockley Lodge; 53.26549°N 0.93130°W	—	Early 19th century	A cottage in red brick with dentilled eaves and a pantile roof. There are two storeys, three bays, and rear extensions. In the centre is a doorway, the windows are horizontally-sliding sashes, and all the openings have segmental arches and painted keystones.	II
Barn at Rockley House; 53.26557°N 0.93109°W	—	Early 19th century	The barn is constructed of red brick, featuring dentilled eaves and a pantile roof with an orb finial. There are two storeys and three bays. It contains a central doorway with a keystone, two openings with segmental heads and keystones, and vents. The left gable has an open dentilled pediment and a large blind archway with a round-arched blind panel above.	II
Rockley House and outbuildings 53.26541°N 0.93081°W	—	1826	The house is in red brick on a plinth, with a raised eaves band and a hipped slate roof. There are two storeys and three bays, and recessed on the right is a later two-storey three-bay wing. In the centre is an arcaded porch with a concave hipped half-conical lead roof with an urn, a moulded cornice, and decorated clustered columns. The doorway has a traceried fanlight, to its left is a canted bay window with a modillion cornice, and the other windows are sashes with moulded surrounds and keystones. Extending from the back of the house are two wings connected at the rear by a coach house, forming a quadrangular courtyard.	II
Canopy to former petrol station 53.25693°N 0.92773°W		1960–61	The canopy at the former petrol station at Markham Moor Service Area is in concrete and was designed by Sam Scorer. It has a rhomboid plan and consists of a hyperbolic paraboloid shell. The canopy has sharp fins that point skywards, and it is supported on its lower edges by four concretes stanchions.	II
