= St Michael and All Angels' Church, Sutton-in-Ashfield =

St Michael and All Angels' Church
- St Michael and All Angels’ Church, Sutton-in-Ashfield

- Location within Nottinghamshire
- 53°07′49.18″N 1°15′16.65″W
- Location: Sutton-in-Ashfield, Nottinghamshire
- Country: England
- Denomination: Church of England

History
- Dedication: St Michael and All Angels

Architecture
- Architect(s): John Fowler 1887 and Louis Ambler 1910
- Groundbreaking: 6 October 1886
- Closed: 2003

Administration
- Province: York
- Diocese: Southwell and Nottingham
- Parish: St Michael and All Angels', Sutton-in-Ashfield

St Michael and All Angels' Church, Sutton-in-Ashfield is a former parish church in the Church of England in Sutton-in-Ashfield, Nottinghamshire.

== History ==
The foundation stone was laid by Mr. U. Unwin Heathcote on 6 October 1886.

The plans for the church were drawn up by the architect John Fowler. The contractor was Morgan and Cowper of Campsall, near Doncaster. The chancel was complete within one year and was opened for worship by the Bishop of Southwell on 28 September 1887.

A nave constructed of iron was added in 1891, but was of poor quality and a stone nave with north and south aisles was designed by Louis Ambler. The foundation stone was laid on 26 July 1909 by the Duke of Portland. The cost of the new nave was £4,500, and the Bishop of Southwell consecrated it on 22 January 1910.

The church became a parish in its own right in 1910.

The church became surplus to requirements and was closed by the Diocese of Southwell and Nottingham in 2003.

Around 2005 the church became the home of the Resurrection Mixed Martial Arts Academy, holding the English Mixed Martial Arts Academy trials for the English team to the IMMAF - International Mixed Martial Arts Federation Championships of January 2022.

== War memorial ==
A memorial to the 227 men of the parish who died in the First World War was unveiled on 20 August 1921 by Lieutenant-Colonel A.B. Smith. It was designed by Louis Ambler.

Following the closure of the church, in 2009 it was moved to the junction of Downing Street and Mansfield Road.
