= St John the Evangelist's Church, Kirkby Woodhouse =

Coordinates: 53°04′40″N 01°15′31″W

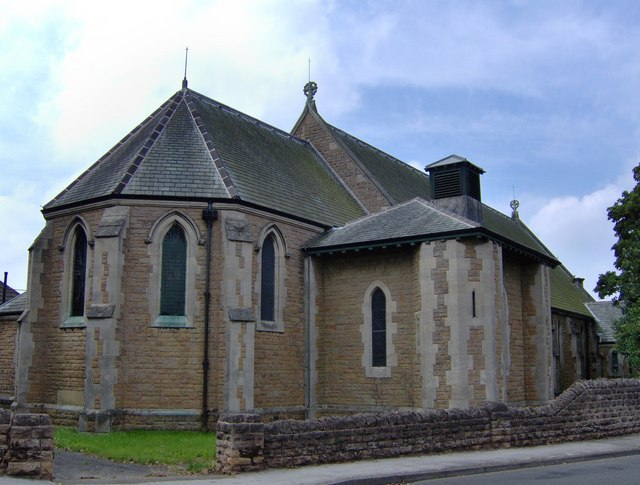
- St John the Evangelist's Church, Kirkby Woodhouse
- Denomination: Church of England
- Churchmanship: Broad Church

History
- Dedication: St John the Evangelist

Administration
- Province: York
- Diocese: Southwell and Nottingham
- Archdeaconry: Newark
- Deanery: Newstead
- Parish: Kirkby Woodhouse

St John the Evangelist's Church, Kirkby-in-Ashfield is a parish church in the Church of England in Kirkby Woodhouse, Nottinghamshire.

== History ==
St John's was built as a daughter church to St Wilfrid's Church, Kirkby-in-Ashfield. Originally constructed in 1860, the present building was constructed in 1906 on Skegby Road. The architect was Louis Ambler and the land was donated by the Duke of Portland and the church cost £10,000. The plans for a tower were never realised.
