= St Giles' Church, Elkesley =

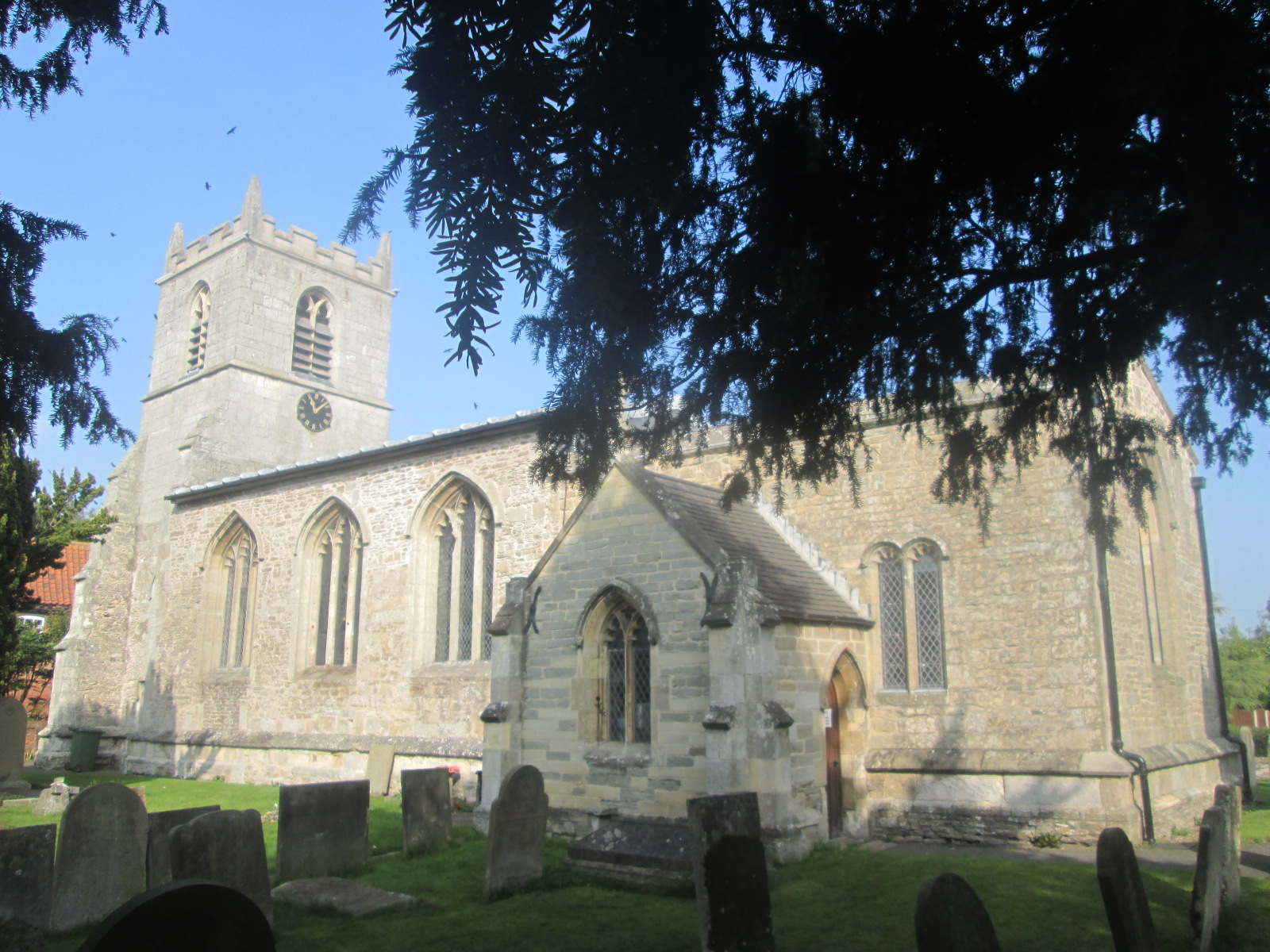
- St Giles' Church, Elkesley
- St Giles' Church, Elkesley
- 53°16′19.46″N 0°58′27.48″W
- OS grid reference: SK 68923 75514
- Location: Elkesley
- Country: England
- Denomination: Church of England

History
- Dedication: St Giles

Architecture
- Heritage designation: Grade I listed

Administration
- Province: York
- Diocese: Diocese of Southwell and Nottingham
- Archdeaconry: Newark
- Deanery: Bassetlaw and Bawtry
- Parish: Elkesley

Clergy
- Bishop(s): The Bishop of Southwell & Nottingham

St Giles' Church is a Grade I listed parish church in the Church of England.

A church in Elkesleigh or Elchersleigh is mentioned in the Domesday Book. It was dedicated to All Saints or All Hallows, as confirmed in wills of parishioners from the 15th and 16th centuries. The shift to a dedication to St Giles was probably initiated at some point in the first half of the 19th century: White’s Directory cites the church as St Giles for the first time in 1844, though there are still later references to All Hallows.

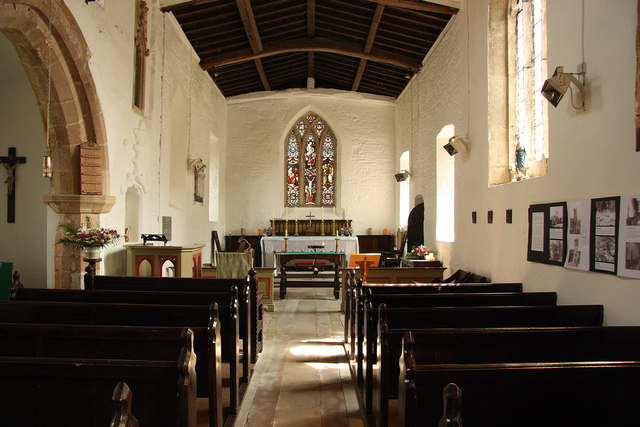
Interior

The building is in the decorated gothic style and made from local limestone. The church consists of a nave, north aisle, chancel, and an embattled west tower with pinnacles. New pews were installed in 1845, and at the same time some parts of the church were partly rebuilt.

Memorials include:

- Catherine Sharpe, 1764, by Ant. Ince. South chancel
- Edward and John Buckles, Mansfield. North chancel

== Bells ==
There are three bells in the tower. They are dedicated in Latin:
1) missi de celis habeao nomen gabrielis
2) hec pro laude pie resonat campana marie
3) nomen sanctorum hec campana olocum [a misspelling; possibly "o locum"?]
Evidence suggests that they were cast by the mid-15th century, and the founder is unknown.

The first bell, ‘Gabriel’, weighs 4 cwt (about 450 lbs) and is 26¼ inches in diameter. ‘Mary’ is heavier, with a total weight of 5 cwt (about 560 lbs) and a 29 inch diameter. 'All Saints' [sic] is 6 cwt (about 670 lbs) and has a diameter of 32¼ inches.

Owing to the precarious state of the wooden supports for the bells, the peal is considered unringable. These bells are one of only two peals in Nottinghamshire that date from before the Reformation, the other being at the Church of St John of Beverley, Scarrington, possibly by the same founder. In addition to their age and dedication, the bells are significant in their tuning, which lies between the beginning of a modern major and minor scale.

== See also ==
- Grade I listed buildings in Nottinghamshire
- Listed buildings in Elkesley
