= St Barnabas' Church, Lenton Abbey =

St. Barnabas’ Church, Lenton Abbey
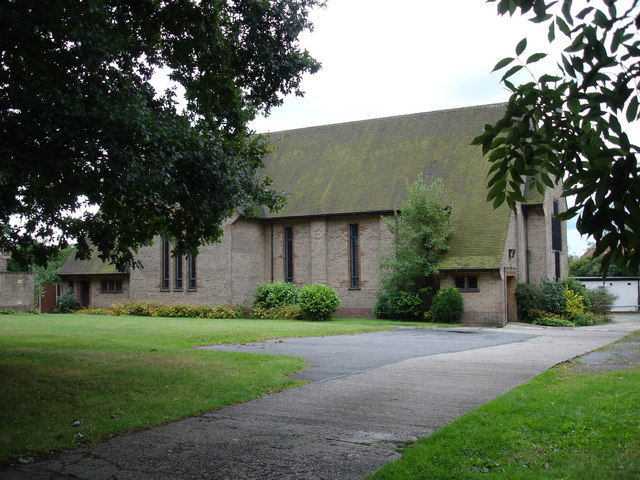
- St. Barnabas’ Church, Lenton Abbey
- 52°56′20″N 1°12′45″W
- Country: England
- Denomination: Church of England
- Churchmanship: Broad Church
- Website: www.stbarnabaslentonabbey.co.uk

History
- Dedication: St. Barnabas

Architecture
- Architect: Thomas Cecil Howitt
- Completed: 1938

Administration
- Province: York
- Diocese: Diocese of Southwell
- Parish: Lenton Abbey

St. Barnabas’ Church is a Church of England church in Lenton Abbey, Nottingham.

== History ==
St. Barnabas’ Church was constructed at the request of the earliest residents of the newly built Lenton Abbey housing estate and was designed by the architect Thomas Cecil Howitt. At the start of construction, a box containing coins, copies of the plans and Nottingham newspapers of the day were placed under the foundation stone. It was consecrated by the Rt. Rev. Henry Mosley the Bishop of Southwell on 25 July 1938. Initially it was a chapel of ease to Holy Trinity Church, Lenton, but on 25 July 1955 it became a parish in its own right. The benefice has usually been held by the incumbent of another parish nearby. For instance, from 1977, the vicar of St. Mary's Church, Wollaton Park had responsibility for St. Barnabas’ parish, but the vicar of Lenton currently has custody of the parish.

== Organ ==
The 2 manual pipe organ dates from 1938 and was manufactured by William Hill & Son & Norman & Beard Ltd. A specification of the organ can be found on the National Pipe Organ Register.

=== List of organists ===
- Miss K. Randle 1938 – 1941
- Gordon Gilbert LLCM 1941 – 1978
- John Holloway 1978 – ????
