= Listed buildings in East Drayton =

East Drayton is a civil parish in the Bassetlaw District of Nottinghamshire, England. The parish contains seven listed buildings that are recorded in the National Heritage List for England. Of these, one is listed at Grade I, the highest of the three grades, and the others are at Grade II, the lowest grade. The parish contains the village of East Drayton and the surrounding countryside, and the listed buildings consist of houses, a cottage and farmhouses, a church, and headstones in the churchyard.

== Key ==
Grade	Criteria
I	Buildings of exceptional interest, sometimes considered to be internationally important
II	Buildings of national importance and special interest

== Buildings ==
Name and location	Photograph	Date	Notes	Grade
St Peter's Church; 53.26932°N 0.83856°W		Late 12th century	The church has been altered and extended through the centuries, and it was restored in 1857 and 1873, and again in 1982. It is built in stone, the nave has a metal roof, the roof of the chancel is in lead, and the aisles have tile roofs. The church consists of a nave with a clerestory, north and south aisles, a south porch, a chancel, and a west tower. The tower has four stages, diagonal buttresses, string courses, and an embattled parapet with crocketed pinnacles and gargoyles. In the lowest stage is a west doorway with a moulded arch and a hood mould, above which is a three-light window with a hood mould, there are clock faces on two sides, and the bell openings have two lights. The parapets of the body of the church are also embattled.	I
The Old Harrow Inn; 53.26811°N 0.83912°W		Late 17th century	Originally a public house, later converted into a cottage, the earlier parts were timber framed. The cottage is in brick, and has pantile roofs with coped gables and kneelers. There is a complex plan, some bays with two storeys, and others with a single storey and an attic. The windows are horizontally-sliding sashes, some with segmental heads.	II
Yew Tree Farmhouse; 53.26785°N 0.83919°W		Late 17th century	The farmhouse has a timber framed core, and the exterior is rendered. It is on a plinth, and has a wooden eaves cornice, and a pantile roof, hipped on the right. There are two storeys, a front of three bays, and a five-bay rear wing with a single storey and an attic. The windows are casements.	II
Pair of headstones 53.26917°N 0.83863°W		1725	The headstones are in the churchyard of St Peter's Church to the south of the church. They are in stone and are rectangular, with curved shaped heads and inscriptions, and are dated 1725 and 1735.	II
Old Vicarage and outbuildings 53.26955°N 0.83763°W		Early 18th century	The former vicarage is in painted rendered brick, with dentilled eaves, and a pantile roof with stone coped gables and kneelers. There are two storeys and four bays, the right bay projecting and gabled. On the front is a gabled lattice porch with a slate roof and a doorway with a fanlight. This is flanked by canted bay windows, and the other windows are sashes. To the right is a single-storey five-bay outbuilding.	II
Field Farmhouse; 53.27120°N 0.85413°W	—	Early 19th century	The farmhouse is brick with red stretchers and pink headers, and has a blue brick band, a raised eaves band, and a slate roof. There are two storeys and attics, a main range of three bays, a four-bay extension to the left, and two-storey rear wings. The central doorway has a ribbed surround and a slightly projecting hood. Flanking and above the doorway are sash windows, and the other windows are casements.	II
The Cottage; 53.26893°N 0.83776°W		Early 19th century	The cottage, which was later extended, is in red brick with dogtooth eaves, and a hipped pantile roof. There are two storeys and four bays, and a rear lean-to. The windows are a mix of casements and horizontally-sliding sashes, and all the openings in the ground floor have segmental heads.	II
