= St Alban's Church, Forest Town =

St. Albans Church, Forest Town
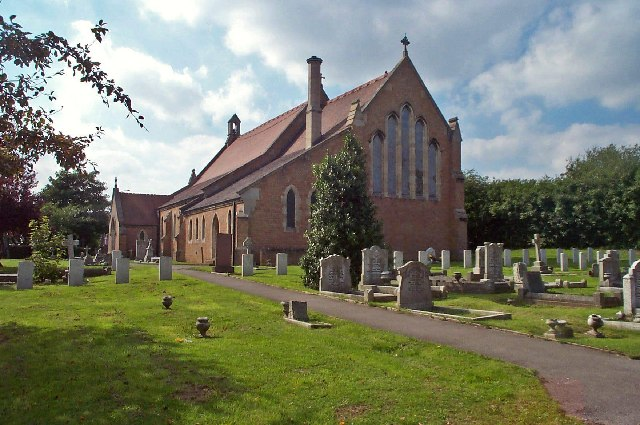
- St. Albans Church, Forest Town

- Location within Nottinghamshire
- 53°09′11″N 01°08′52″W
- Location: Forest Town, Nottinghamshire
- Country: England
- Denomination: Church of England
- Churchmanship: Broad Church
- Website: www.stalbans-foresttown.co.uk

History
- Dedication: St Alban
- Consecrated: 2 July 1911

Architecture
- Architect: Louis Ambler
- Groundbreaking: 5 November 1910

Administration
- Province: York
- Diocese: Southwell and Nottingham
- Archdeaconry: Newark
- Deanery: Mansfield
- Parish: Forest Town, Nottinghamshire

Clergy
- Vicar: Revd Philip Stead

St. Albans Church, Forest Town is a parish church in the Church of England in Forest Town, Nottinghamshire.

== History ==
St. Albans Church was built by the architect Louis Ambler. The foundation stone was laid by the William Cavendish-Bentinck, 6th Duke of Portland on 5 November 1910 by the Duke of Portland. and the church was consecrated by the Bishop of Southwell, Sir Edwyn Hoskyns, on 2 July 1911.

The north aisle was added at a cost of £1,400 and consecrated on 31 September 1937.

After a major fire in 1968, a restoration was carried out and the church re-opened in 1969.

== Stained glass ==
There is a new east window installed in 1995.

== Organ ==
A new organ by Brindley and Foster was installed in 1917 and dedicated on 18 March 1918 by the Bishop of Southwell.

== Incumbents ==
- Revd Harry Bull 1911 - 24
- Revd Robert Percival Tinsley 1924 - 29
- Revd George Sprittles 1929 - 35
- Revd Percy Clegg 1935 - 42
- Revd Douglas Mortimer 1942 - 47
- Revd John Spencer 1947 - 55
- Revd Philip Walker 1955 - 64
- Revd Walter Beasley 1964 - 70
- Revd Leslie Standley 1970 - 76
- Revd A Parsons 1976 - 78
- Revd Ian Gibbs 1979 - 83
- Revd Robin Walford 1984 - 92
- Revd Robert Smith 1992 - 98
- Revd Philip Stead 1999 -
