= Listed buildings in Elkesley =

Elkesley is a civil parish in the Bassetlaw District of Nottinghamshire, England. The parish contains seven listed buildings that are recorded in the National Heritage List for England. Of these, two are listed at Grade I, the highest of the three grades, one is at Grade II*, the middle grade, and the others are at Grade II, the lowest grade. The parish contains the village of Elkesley and the surrounding area. The listed buildings consist of two farmhouses, farm buildings, a milestone, a gateway and lodges to Clumber Park, and a bridge.

== Key ==
Grade	Criteria
I	Buildings of exceptional interest, sometimes considered to be internationally important
II*	Particularly important buildings of more than special interest
II	Buildings of national importance and special interest

== Buildings ==
Name and location	Photograph	Date	Notes	Grade
St Giles' Church; 53.27216°N 0.96791°W		13th century	The church has been altered and extended through the centuries, including a restoration in 1844–45. It is in stone and has roofs of lead and pantile. The church consists of a nave with a clerestory, a north aisle, north and south porches, a chancel and a west tower. The tower has four stages, with buttresses, and an embattled parapet with corner pinnacles. The north porch has a 14th-century archway, and the south porch has an inner doorway with a Tudor arch.	I
Meadow Farmhouse; 53.27302°N 0.97026°W	—	Mid 18th century	The farmhouse, formerly two cottages, is in colourwashed rendering with a pantile roof. There are two storeys and five bays. On the front is a doorway and casement windows, and all the openings in the ground floor are under segmental arches.	II
Portland Farmhouse, walls and pavilions 53.27205°N 0.96838°W	—	18th century	The farmhouse is in rendered brick with a coved cornice and a slate roof, hipped on the right. There are two storeys and three bays, with wings to the right and the rear. On the front is a gabled porch with a pantile roof and bargeboards, and the windows are sashes. Extending from the porch is a brick balustraded wall forming a quadrangle. On two sides are pavilions with arched entrances.	II
Milestone; 53.28260°N 0.97172°W		1767	The milestone on the north side of Jockey Road is a rectangular stone 1.75 metres (5 ft 9 in) high, with shallow pyramidal-shaped coping. There are inscriptions on three sides.	II
Apleyhead Lodge; 53.28910°N 1.03399°W		c. 1770	The gateway and lodges at the entrance to Clumber Park are in stone. In the centre is an archway with an archivolt, a fluted keystone, and decorated spandrels. Above it is a reeded frieze, a dentilled cornice, and a balustraded parapet with an achievement of arms. The flanking piers have recessed round-arched panels on the road side, and niches on the park side. On each side of these is a colonnade ending in rusticated pilasters. Flanking them are lodges with curving front walls, each containing a central recessed arch with a window, and round-arched niches. The end walls have blind arches containing a round raised centre, above which is a balustraded parapet.	I
West Bridge; 53.27473°N 1.02897°W	—	1789	The bridge carries Blyth Road (A164 road) over the River Poulter. It is in red brock faced with stone, and consists of three unequal segmental arches. The piers are vermiculated, with impost bands and soffits, and contain round-headed niches. The abutment walls are coped and have round end piers with concave domed caps. On the bridge is a coped balustrade with vermiculated panels, and on one pier is a plaque with the date and a family crest.	II*
Farm buildings, Portland Farm; 53.27243°N 0.96835°W		1804	The farm buildings are in brick with dentilled eaves and pantile roofs. They consist of a central pigeoncote with two storeys and an attic, and two bays, flanked by single-storey stable blocks with four bays, and projecting wings containing stables. In the upper part of the pigeoncote are entrances for the pigeons and two rows of perches, and in the pedimented gable is an owl hole.	II
