= Markham Moor =

Village in Nottinghamshire, England

Coordinates: 53.25°N 0.92°W

- Location within Nottinghamshire
- OS grid reference: SK715735
- Civil parish: West Drayton
- District: Bassetlaw
- Shire county: Nottinghamshire
- Region: East Midlands
- Country: England
- Sovereign state: United Kingdom
- Post town: RETFORD
- Postcode district: DN22
- Dialling code: 01777
- Police: Nottinghamshire
- Fire: Nottinghamshire
- Ambulance: East Midlands
- UK Parliament: Newark

Markham Moor is a village which lies five miles south of the town of Retford in Nottinghamshire. The village is in the civil parish of West Drayton. Markham Moor lies on the junction between the A1, A638 and A57 roads. The village was on the route of the old Great North Road and was also traditionally part of the East Markham parish.

== Markham Moor junction ==
Markham Moor has a junction in the middle of the village which links the A1 between London and Edinburgh, the A638 to Retford and the A57 to Lincoln. Construction on the larger roundabout began on July 5 1966.

On 29 July 1991 a car drove the wrong way southwards, along the northbound carriageway, and had a head-on collision, with a Ford Sierra Sapphire, and killed three people. A Volvo 343 saloon, driven by a 52-year-old Vernon Mitchell, of 66 Clowne Road, in Stanfree near Bolsover, travelled the wrong way around the roundabout. He was deaf. The other driver, northbound, was 57-year-old Robert Alan Leiper of Stevenson Court, Livingston, West Lothian in Scotland. Vernon Mitchell was found to be five times over the alcohol limit, with 414mg of alcohol.

Previously, this junction was a simple roundabout, but as part of junction improvements by the Highways Agency between Blyth in Nottinghamshire and Peterborough, the junction changed to the current two level junction, with one roundabout at the north end for the A57 and A638, and another roundabout on the south side for the B1164 Great North Road to Tuxford. Both roundabouts are connected by a flyover.

A public inquiry was launched into the improvements in 2006 after a number of objections, the majority from the nearby village of Elkesley. The objectors were concerned with the timing of the improvements and increased traffic flow on the A1 which bypasses Elkesley. The upgraded junction was completed in October 2008.

=== Service area ===
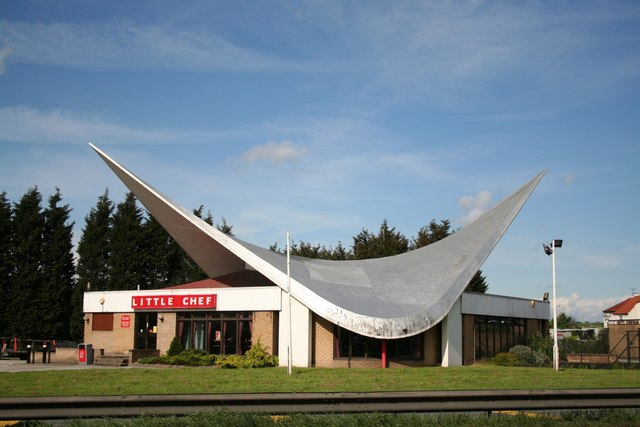
The former Markham Moor Little Chef

Markham Moor junction has a number of companies providing services for travellers travelling along the major trunk roads which meet at the Markham Moor junction, including McDonald's, a Travelodge, a historic hotel on the route of the old Great North Road and a truck stop.

A Little Chef and Travelodge, just north of the roundabout, on the northbound carriageway, opened in October 1988.

The services, on the southbound carriageway, also held a Little Chef café, which was originally constructed as a petrol station and converted to a Happy Eater in 1982 but disused from 2012 to 2019.

Due to its unusual hyperbolic paraboloid shell roof, constructed in 1960–61 to designs by architect Hugh Segar (Sam) Scorer and structural engineer Hajnal-Kónyi, there was a preservation campaign in 2004 to get the building listed to prevent it from being demolished as part of the Markham Moor junction improvement plans published by the Highways Agency. The plans were revised to save and improve access to the restaurant. The shell canopy was designated Grade II listed on 27 March 2012. It was purchased and redeveloped by Stockton-on-Tees based company, Cliff Court Developments Ltd, then re-opened as a Starbucks in December 2019.
