= St Thomas' Church, Kirkby-in-Ashfield =

St Thomas’ Church, Kirkby in Ashfield
- Location within Nottinghamshire
- 53°05′47″N 1°14′35.3″W
- OS grid reference: SK 50778 55730
- Location: Kirkby-in-Ashfield, Nottinghamshire
- Country: England
- Denomination: Church of England

History
- Dedication: St Thomas
- Consecrated: 23 May 1903

Architecture
- Architect: Louis Ambler
- Groundbreaking: 27 July 1901

Administration
- Province: York
- Diocese: Southwell and Nottingham
- Archdeaconry: Newark
- Deanery: Newstead
- Parish: St Thomas Kirkby in Ashfield

St Thomas’ Church, Kirkby-in-Ashfield is a parish church in the Church of England in Kirkby-in-Ashfield, Nottinghamshire.

== History ==
The foundation stone was laid on 27 July 1901 by the Duke of Portland. The designs of the church were drawn up by the architect Louis Ambler.

The church cost over £5,000 (equivalent to £525,600 in 2025), of which £2,000 was donated by the Duke of Portland.

The church was consecrated on 23 May 1903 by the Bishop of Southwell.

A Lady Chapel was designed by E Watkinson and built between 1936 and 1937, entirely by voluntary spare time labour of craftsmen and helpers of the congregation. It was dedicated by the Bishop of Southwell on 17 April 1937.

== Organ ==
The organ is by Wadsworth Brothers of Manchester.
