= St Peter's Church, East Drayton =

- Church of St Peter and St Paul, East Drayton
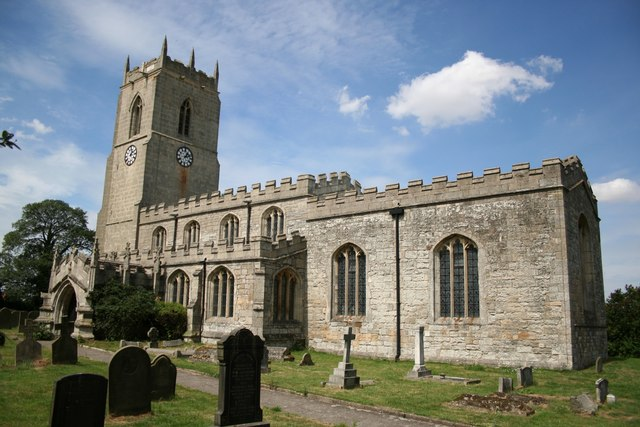
- St Peter's Church, East Drayton
- St Peter's Church, East Drayton
- 53°16′8.54″N 0°50′21.92″W
- OS grid reference: SK 77559 75330
- Location: East Drayton
- Country: England
- Denomination: Church of England

History
- Dedication: St Peter

Architecture
- Heritage designation: Grade I listed

Administration
- Diocese: Diocese of Southwell and Nottingham
- Archdeaconry: Newark
- Deanery: Bassetlaw and Bawtry
- Parish: East Drayton

The Church of St Peter and St Paul, East Drayton is a Grade I listed parish church in the Church of England in East Drayton.

== History ==
The church was dates from the end of the 12th century. It was restored in 1857 by the Ecclesiastical Commissioners. The nave and aisles were restored in 1873 and the roof in 1982.

A pair of headstones in the churchyard are Grade II listed.

== Organ ==
The church contains an organ dating from 1860 by J Halmshaw, which was brought from St Leonard's Church, Ragnall and installed here in 1995 by Anthony Herrod. A specification of the organ can be found on the National Pipe Organ Register.

== See also ==
- Grade I listed buildings in Nottinghamshire
- Listed buildings in East Drayton
