= All Saints' Church, Huthwaite =

Coordinates: 53°07′38″N 01°18′07″W

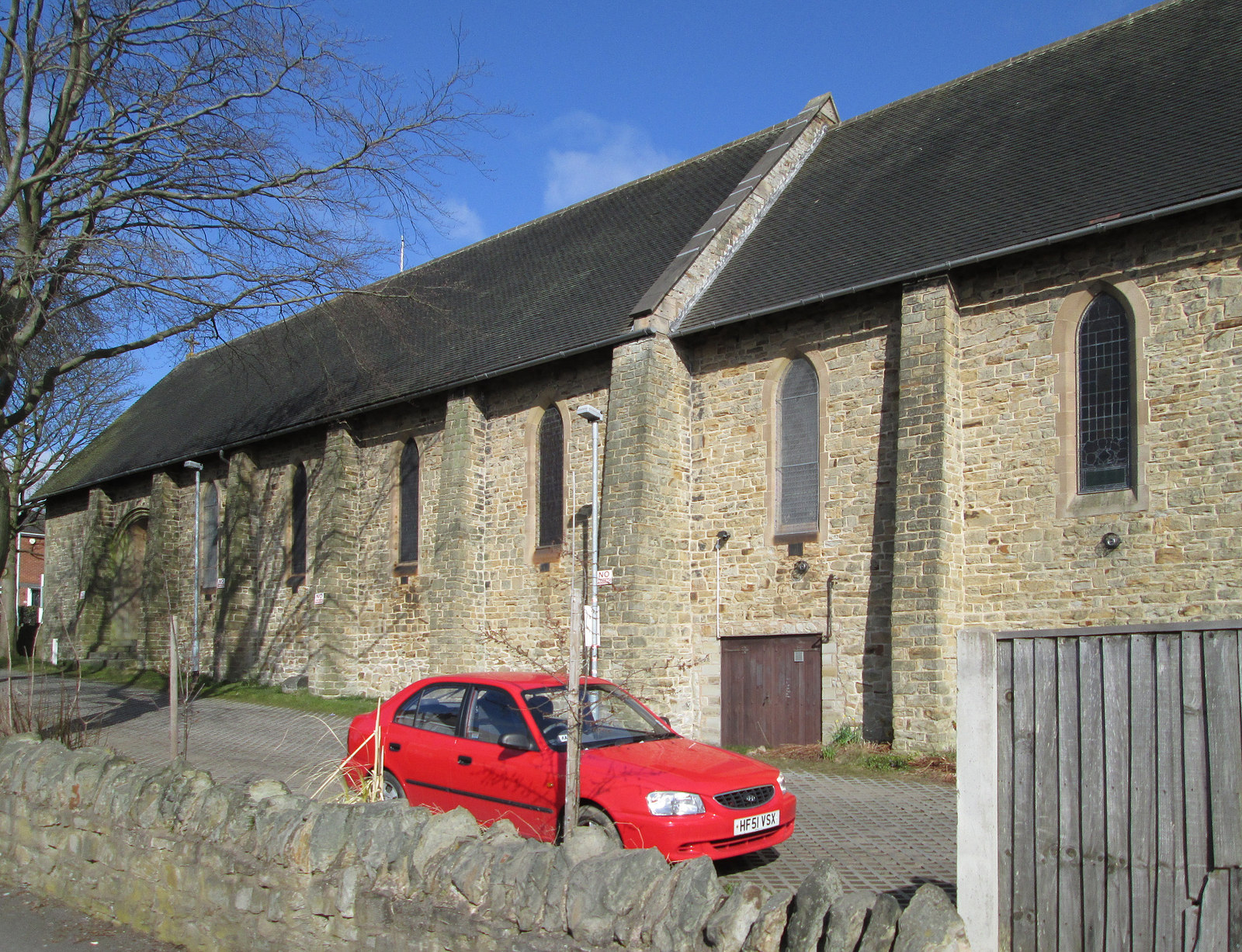
- All Saints' Church, Huthwaite
- Denomination: Church of England
- Churchmanship: Broad Church

History
- Dedication: All Saints

Administration
- Province: York
- Diocese: Southwell and Nottingham
- Parish: Huthwaite

All Saints' Church, Huthwaite is a parish church in the Church of England in Huthwaite, Nottinghamshire.

== History ==
The church dates from 1903 and the stone was taken from a seam in the local colliery and delivered to the site by the colliers.
