= Kirkby-in-Ashfield =

Town in Nottinghamshire, England

Coordinates: 53.099°N 1.245°W

- Town
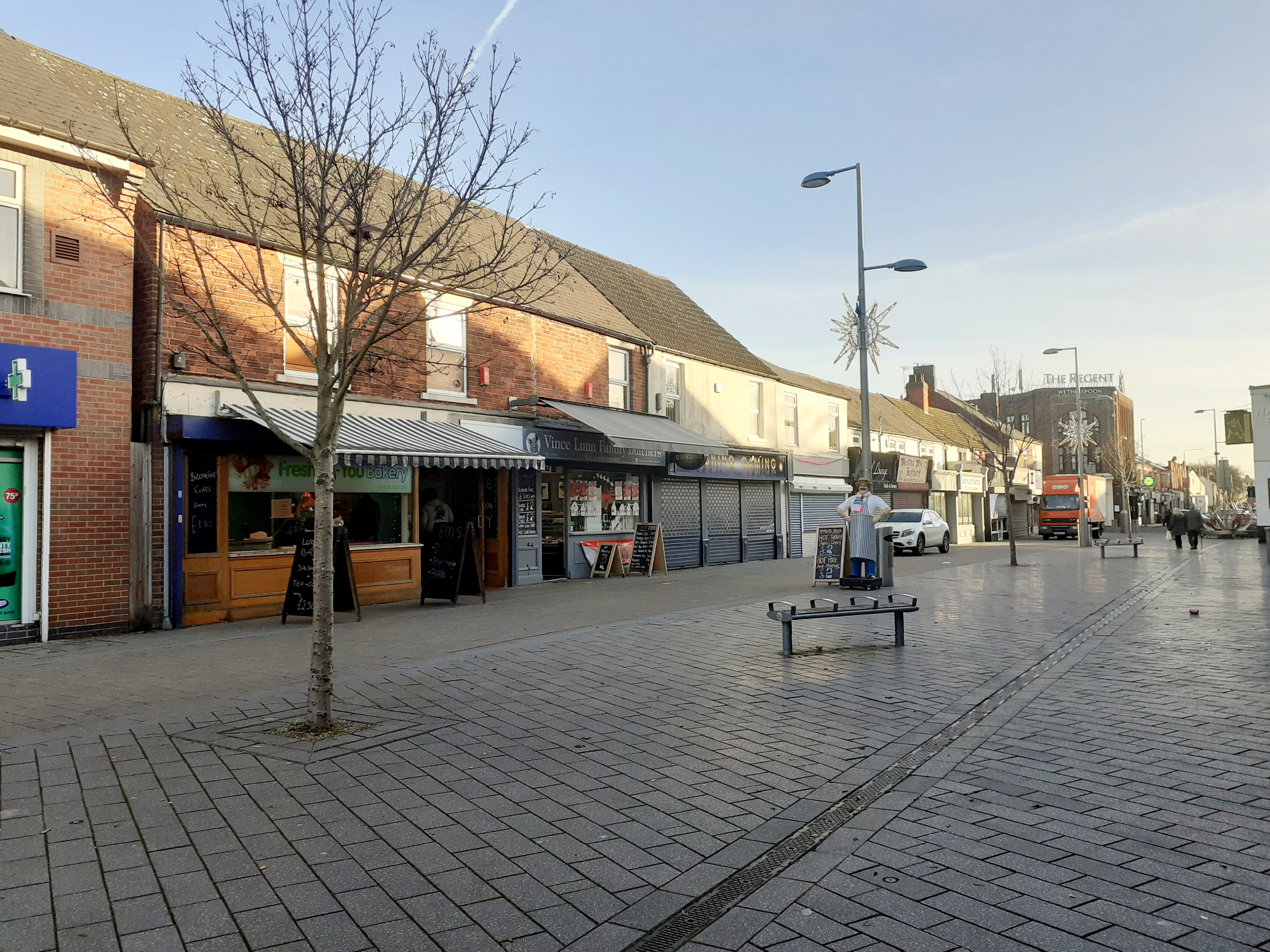
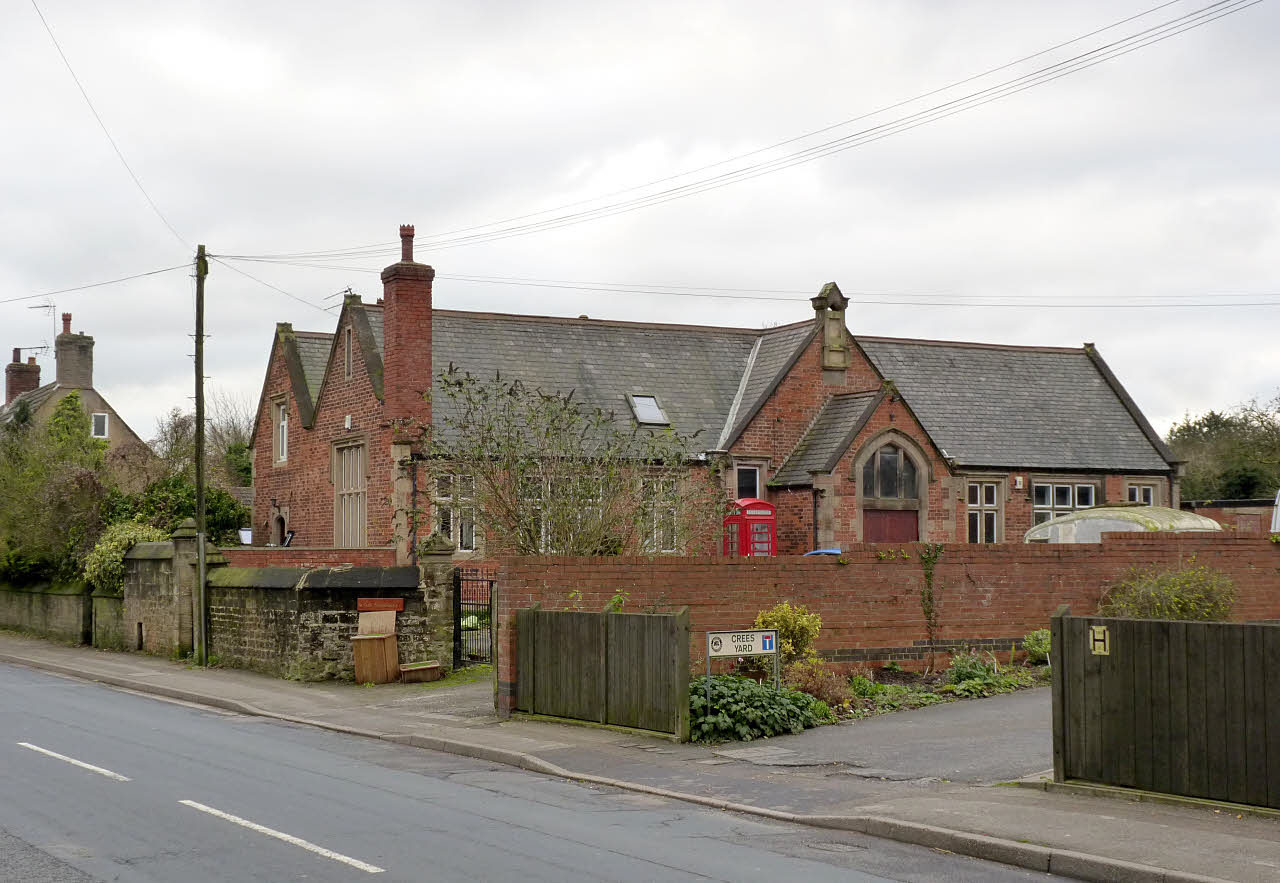
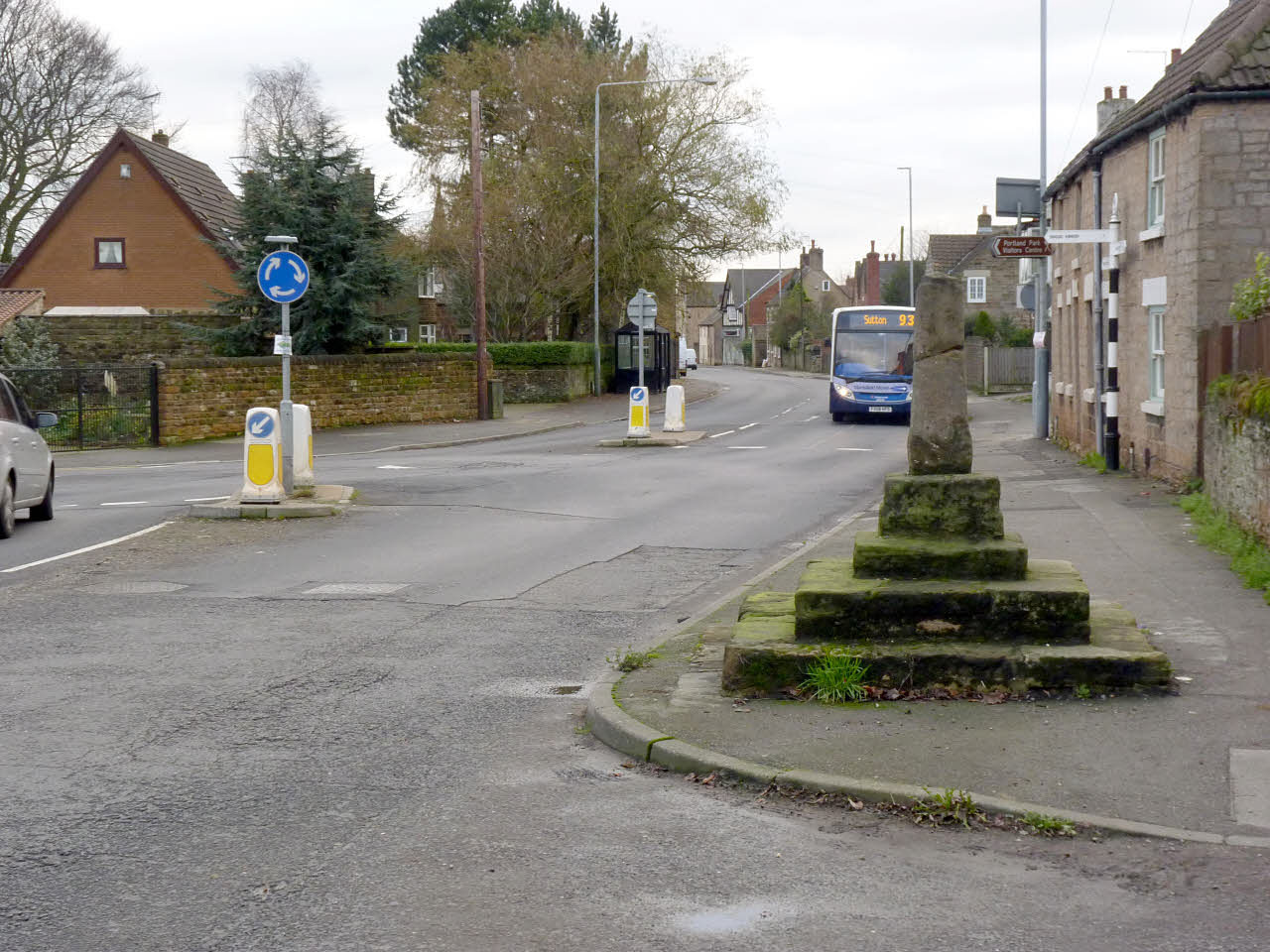
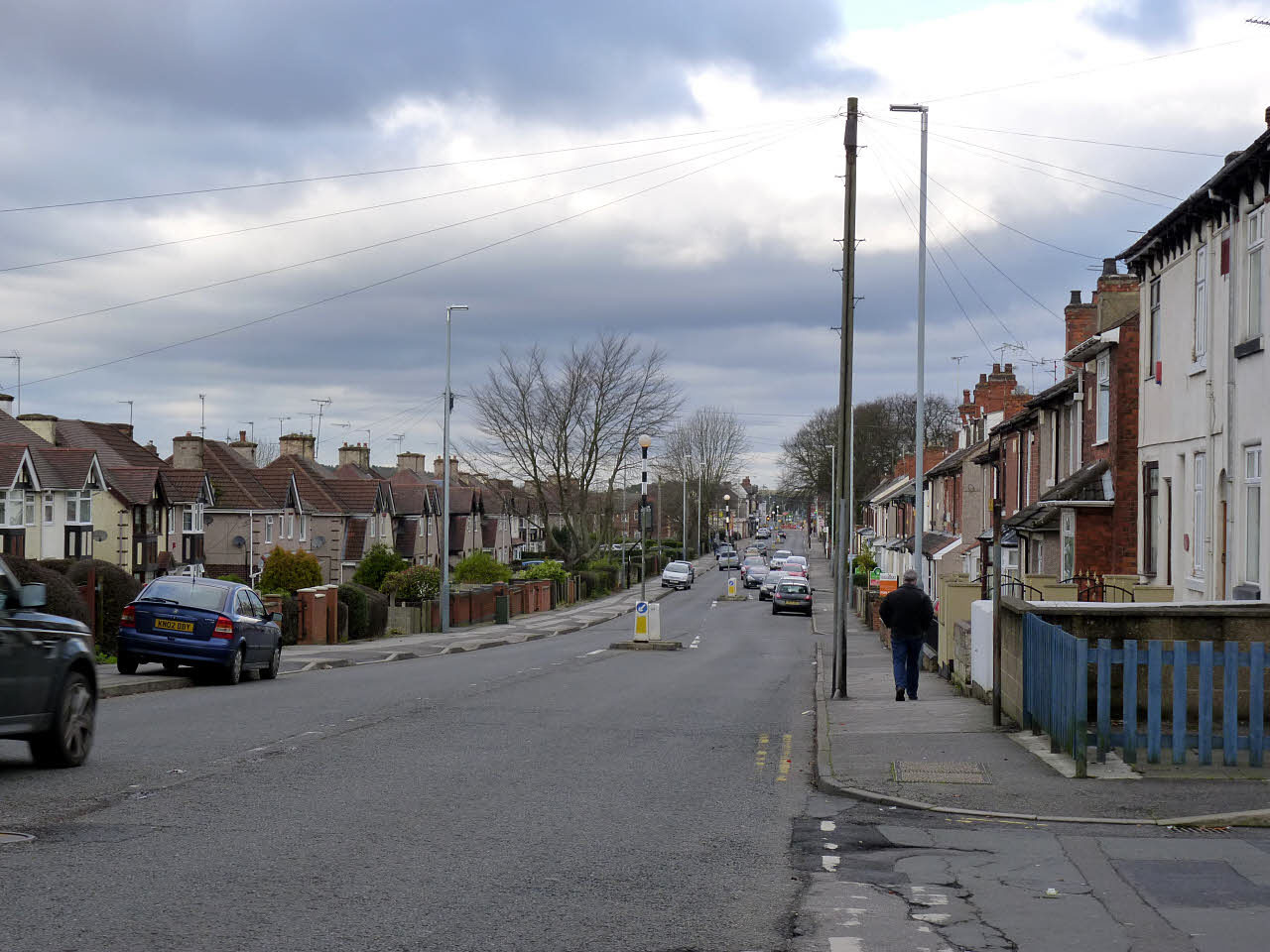
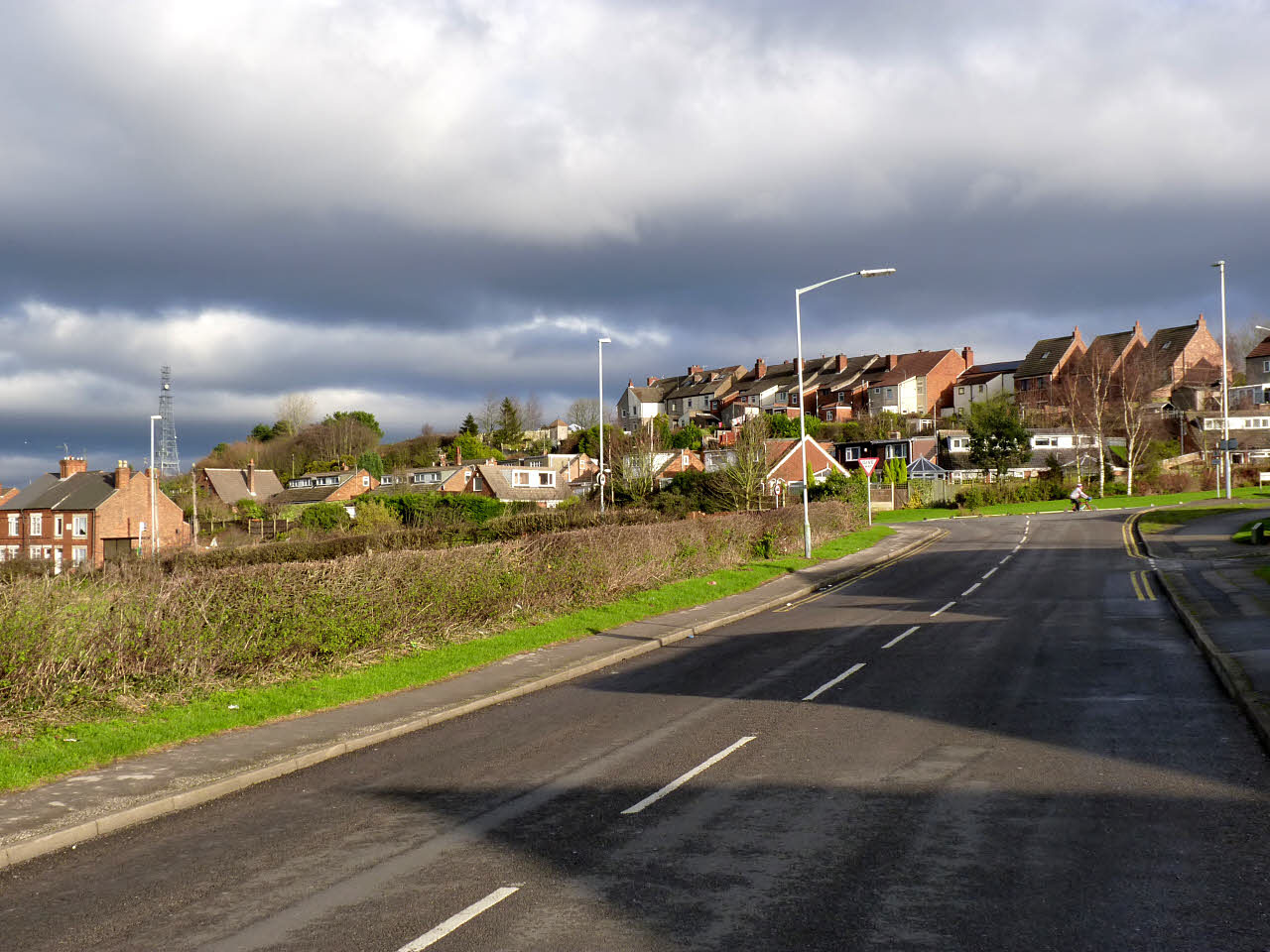
- Central shops, pedestrianised part of Low Moor Road Ye Olde School House Kirkby Cross monument Kingsway, looking towards town centre Shoulder of Mutton Hill

- Location within Nottinghamshire
- Population: 21,285
- OS grid reference: SK 50547 56054
- District: Ashfield
- Shire county: Nottinghamshire
- Region: East Midlands
- Country: England
- Sovereign state: United Kingdom
- Areas of the town: List: Annesley; Annesley Woodhouse; Kirkby Woodhouse; Newstead; Nuncargate; Town Centre
- Post town: Nottingham
- Postcode district: NG17
- Dialling code: 01623
- Police: Nottinghamshire
- Fire: Nottinghamshire
- Ambulance: East Midlands
- UK Parliament: Ashfield
- Website: Ashfield District Council

Kirkby-in-Ashfield is a market town in the Ashfield District of Nottinghamshire, England, with a population of 21,285 in the 2021 census. The town is a part of the wider Mansfield Urban Area. Kirkby-in-Ashfield lies on the eastern edge of the Erewash Valley which separates Nottinghamshire and Derbyshire. The Head Offices of Ashfield District Council are located on Urban Road in the town centre.

== History ==
Kirkby, as it is locally known, was originally a Danish settlement (Kirk-by translates as 'Church Town' in Danish) and is a collection of small villages including Old Kirkby, The Folly (East Kirkby), Nuncargate and Kirkby Woodhouse. It is mentioned in the Domesday Book and has two main churches: St Wilfrid's, a Norman church, which was gutted by fire on 6 January 1907 but quickly re-built; and St Thomas', built in the early 1910s in neo-gothic style.

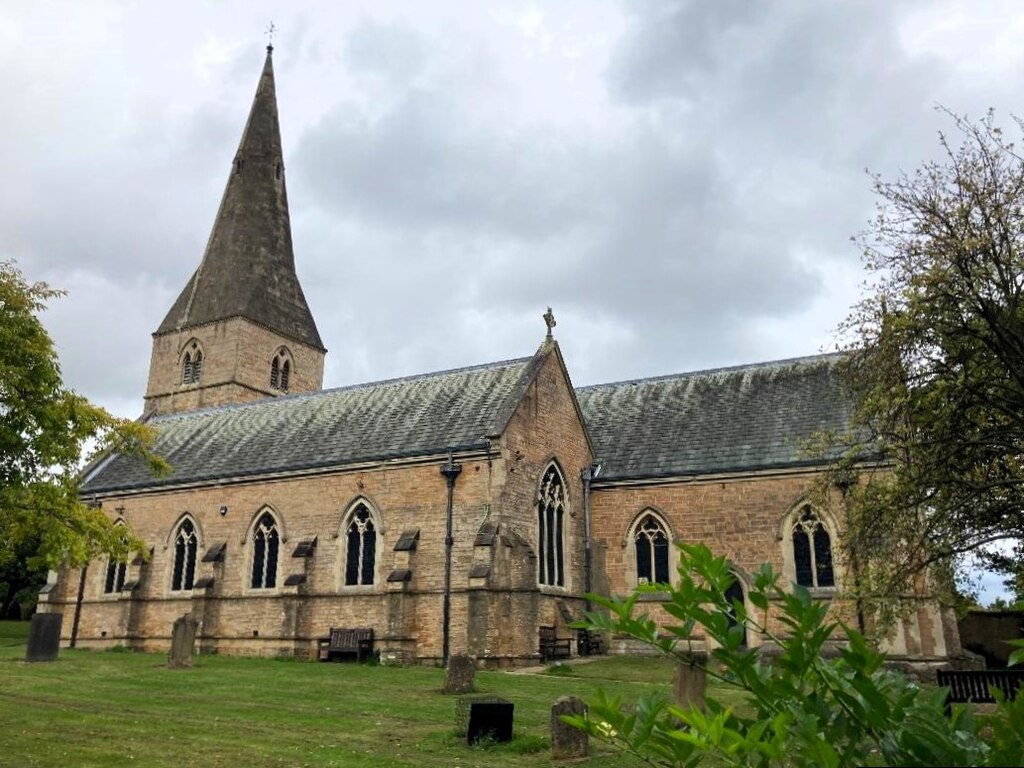
St Wilfrid’s Church

Kirkby Manor dated back to the 13th Century. Its owner in 1284 Robert de Stuteville was fined by King Edward I for not attending the Royal summons. However, in 1292 Robert clearly forgiven, hosted the king at the manor to a nights stay.

Cardinal Thomas Wolsey in 1530, travelled through Sutton in Ashfield having been recalled to London by King Henry VIII, before he stayed at nearby Kirkby Hardwick.

Charles Cavendish (landowner, born 1553) son of Bess of Hardwick had built a house in 1598 in Kirkby.

=== Industrial Revolution ===
Kirkby-in-Ashfield was once an important centre of coal mining and railways in west Nottinghamshire, with three active coal mines and several railway junctions. The former Mansfield and Pinxton Railway from the Erewash Valley Line was joined here by the later Midland Railway line from Nottingham. The Great Central Railway main line passed to the south-west side of the town and had a double junction with the Great Northern Railway Leen Valley Extension line to Langwith Junction and the Mansfield Railway to Clipstone.

==== Rail stations ====
The town has been served by four stations. Only one is now open:

- Kirkby-in-Ashfield East was the main station for the town on the former Midland Railway line between Nottingham and Mansfield. It closed in the 1960s.
- Kirkby-in-Ashfield on the Robin Hood Line was opened in the 1990s and replaced the former station at Kirkby East.
- Kirkby-in-Ashfield Central was opened on the now-defunct Mansfield Railway. It closed in the 1950s to passengers and the site is now an industrial estate, although the old station master's house can still be seen.
- Kirkby Bentinck was opened on the Great Central Main Line from Nottingham Victoria to Sheffield Victoria. The station closed in the 1960s and the site has been cleared, although the old station masters house is still in situ. This was the only mainline station in the entire Ashfield and Mansfield District area. With the other being at Annesley and Hollinwell.

The town rapidly expanded during the Victorian era. However the closure of the coal mines in the 1980s and early 1990s led to a major slump in the local economy, and the area then suffered a high level of socio-economic depression.

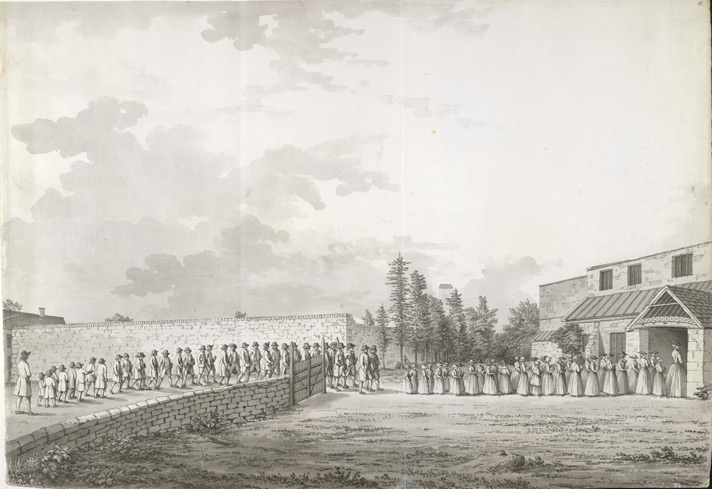
Kirkby in Ashfield education in the eighteenth century, as drawn by Samuel Hieronymus Grimm

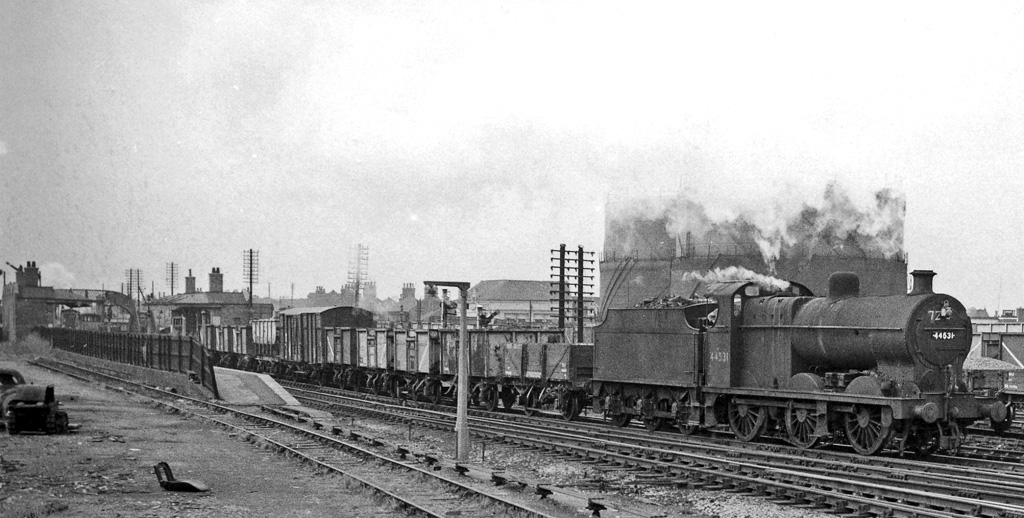
The now-closed Kirkby-in-Ashfield East railway station in 1963

== Economy ==
=== Regeneration ===
The Kirkby in Ashfield, Sutton in Ashfield Town investment plan 2021-2030 sets out the investment which is needed in Kirkby in Ashfield. One such project is the North Kirkby Gateway Project which aims to create new homes and commercial units.

In 2013, plans were introduced to create a new civic square from what was a car park. Nearby permanent market stalls were removed in October 2014.

The town centre underwent further upgrading, starting in late 2014 and 2015 to include the demolition of the old Co-Operative foodstore and county library with surrounding pedestrian plaza, to be rebuilt with a Morrisons store.

A new indoor market – named Moor Market – was created in 2021 by internally joining adjacent small retail shops into a larger space.

In 2021, a new leisure centre was developed including a swimming pool for the first time in Kirkby, partially on land originally purchased in 1935 by Kirkby Urban District Council, to replace the old Festival Hall.

== Education ==
The town has two large secondary schools, Ashfield School and Outwood Academy Kirkby.

== Politics ==
Local politics were dominated by the Labour Party for much of the 20th century; however, Ashfield attracted media attention in the late 1970s with a shock by-election win for the Conservatives. From the 2010 General Election until her stepping down in 2019, the MP was Gloria De Piero, best known for her work with GMTV. She took over from Geoff Hoon, one-time Secretary of State for Defence during the premiership of Tony Blair. She was elected with a very slim majority of 192 votes from the Liberal Democrats' Jason Zadrozny. In 2019, Conservative Lee Anderson won the seat.

== Religion ==
The area around St Wilfrid's Church is designated a conservation area, and consists of former farm buildings built from local stone, some of which are listed. In the conservation area, at the junction of Church Street, Chapel Street and Sutton Road, is Kirkby Cross. This is the remains of a thirteenth-century village cross in dressed stone, and is a listed structure and designated ancient monument.

== Media ==
The town receives its television signals from various regional transmitters: Waltham (BBC East Midlands/ITV Central East), Belmont (BBC Yorkshire and Lincolnshire/ITV Yorkshire), and Sutton Coldfield (BBC West Midlands/ITV Central West).

Local radio stations are BBC Radio Nottingham on 95.5 FM, Capital East Midlands on 96.5 FM and community based station Mansfield 103.2 FM which broadcast from Mansfield.

The town is served by the local newspaper, Mansfield and Ashfield Chad.

== Notable people ==
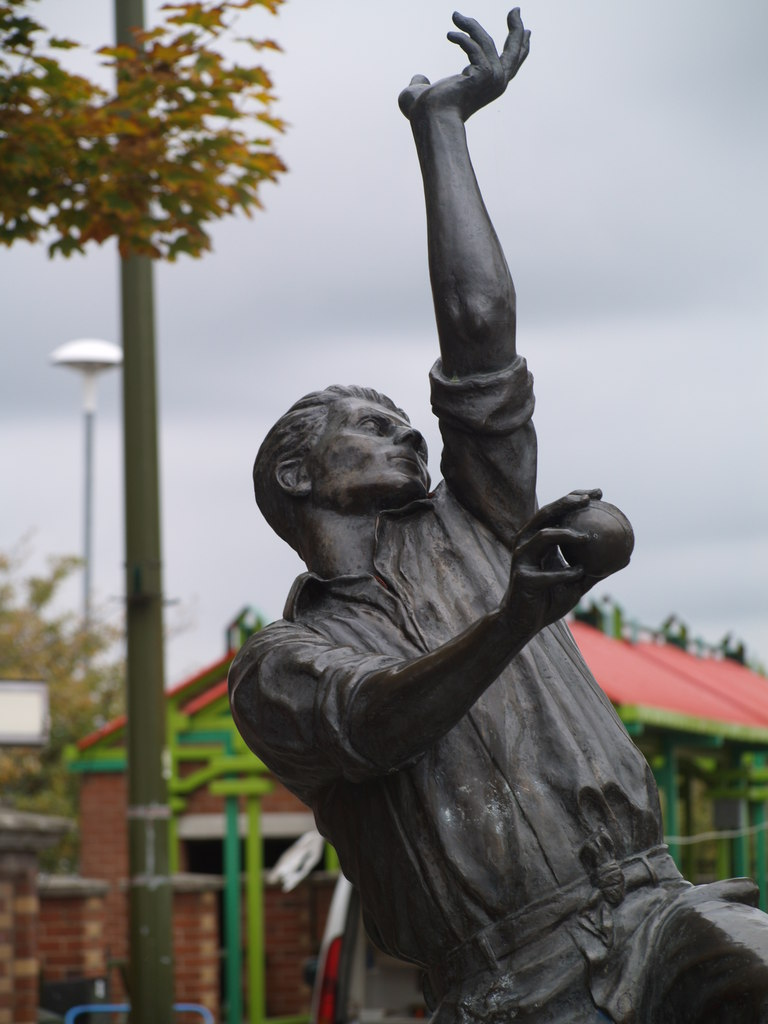
Part-view of the Harold Larwood statue in 2009, before its 2015 relocation nearby to form a group of three cricketers. By Neale Andrew, it was unveiled in 2002.

- James Graham (born 1982), playwright and screenwriter. Known for the writings of the series of Sherwood (2022), The Way (2024), Brian and Maggie (2025) and Brexit: The Uncivil War (2019).
- Reverend Sir Richard Kaye, 6th Baronet. Rector of Kirkby in Ashfield from 1765 to 1809 and Dean of Lincoln. Kaye employed Samuel Hieronymous Grimm to make a series of drawings of life in Ashfield in the late 18th century.
- Oliver Hynd (born 1994) 2016 & 2012 Paralympic, Gold, Silver, Bronze medallist in swimming, younger brother of Sam Hynd
- Sam Hynd – 2008 Paralympic, double gold medallist in swimming.
- Enid Bakewell - English cricket player - inaugurated in the ICC Hall of Fame, considered one of the best all rounders in women's cricket
- Dave Thomas – former English footballer, played for Everton, Burnley and Queens Park Rangers.
- Tom Naylor - English footballer, currently playing for Portsmouth FC. Formerly of Mansfield Town, Derby County, and Burton Albion.
- Helen Cresswell – English television scriptwriter and author was born in the town in 1934.
- Joe Hardstaff (RAF officer) First Class Cricketer.
- Henry Ely Shacklock Pioneer in Coal Ranges.
- Carl Toms, Costume Designer.
- Harold Larwood – English cricket player born in Nuncargate in 1904, best known for his bodyline bowling in the Ashes Test series of 1932–33.

== Places of interest ==
- Newstead Abbey
- Sherwood Observatory

== See also ==
- Listed buildings in Kirkby-in-Ashfield
- Kirkby-in-Ashfield railway station
- St John the Evangelist's Church, Kirkby Woodhouse
- Hollinwell incident
