= Louis Ambler =

English architect (1862–1946)

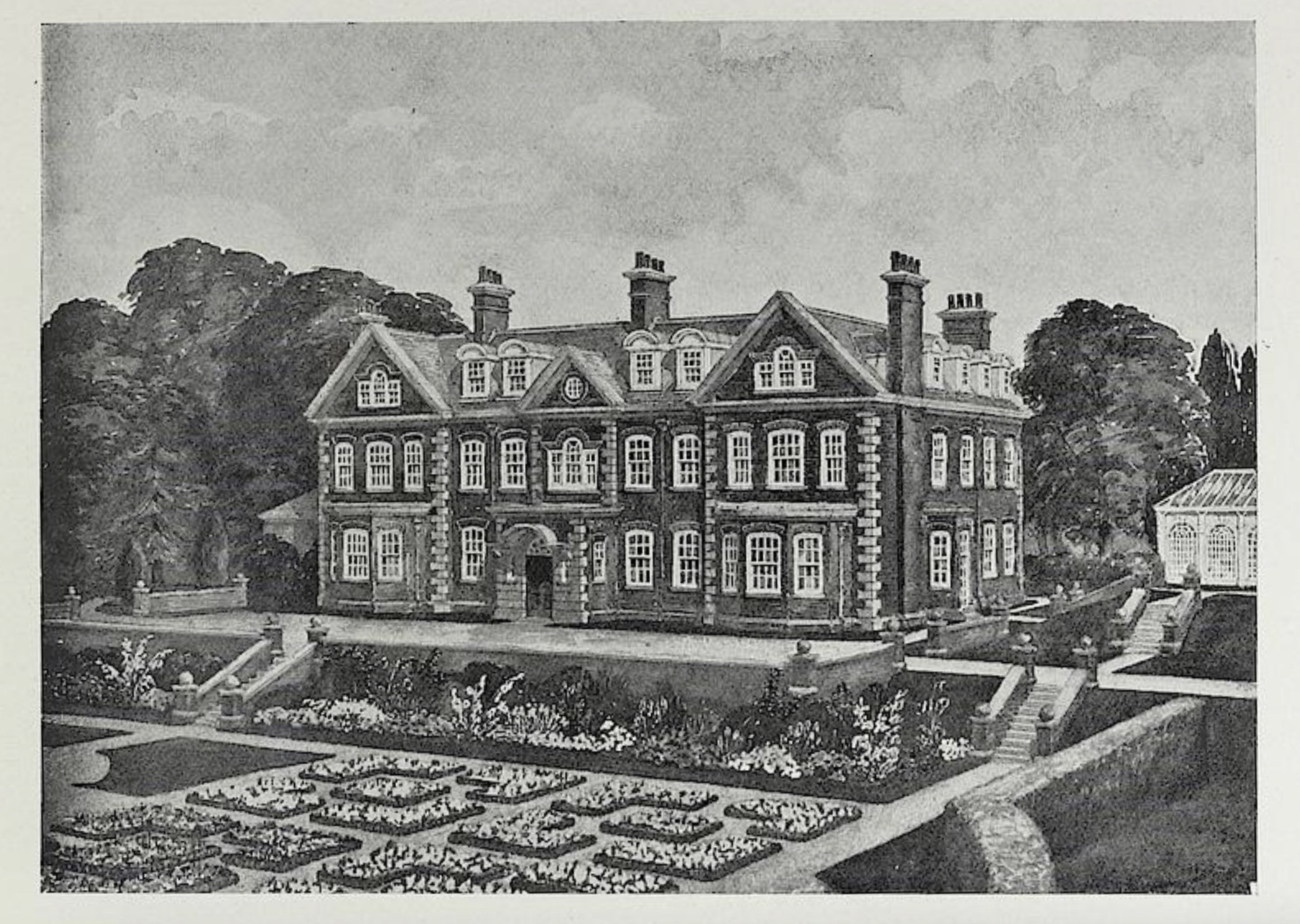
Langwith Lodge from The Studio Yearbook of Decorative Art 1907

St Michael and All Angels' Church, Outram Street, Sutton-in-Ashfield, Nottinghamshire 1909

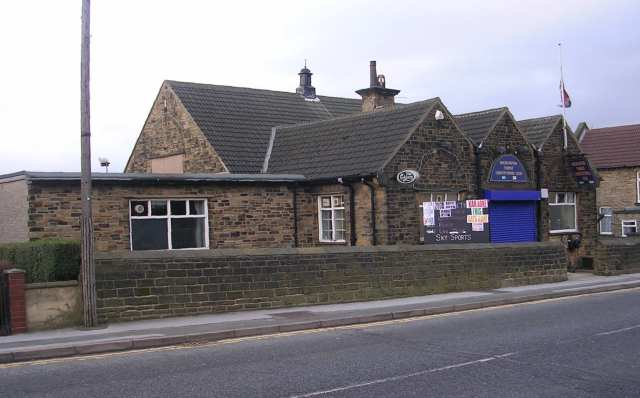
Drighlington Tempest Constitutional Club 1910

Louis Ambler FSA FRIBA (2 June 1862 - 1 April 1946) was an English architect.

== Career ==
He was born on 2 June 1862 in Manningham in Yorkshire, the son of John Ambler (1832–1889) and Mary Hannah Wood (1831–1893).

He was articled to Henry Francis Lockwood and William Mawson of Bradford where he won a prize in the Bradford Society of Architects and Surveyors Pupils’ Competition in 1883. Later he was assistant to Robert William Edis. He also assisted George Frederick Bodley.

He began in independent practice in 1889 initially at 8 Osnaburgh Street, London, but by 1892 he had moved to The Clock House, Arundel Street, Strand, London. Later he was based at 200-2 Temple Chambers, Temple Avenue, London.

He was nominated for ARIBA in 1888 and FRIBA in 1900.

He was a vice-president of the Society of Yorkshiremen in London in 1901.

In 1921 he was appointed a Fellow of the Royal Society of Antiquaries.

He died on 1 April 1946 at the Archway Hospital, Highgate in London and his funeral took place at the Undercliffe Cemetery, Bradford on 6 April 1946.

== Publications ==
- The old halls and manor houses of Yorkshire. Publisher: Batsford. 1913.
- The Ambler Family. Publisher: Percy Lund, Humphries and Company. 1924.

== Notable works ==
- St Mary and St Laurence's Church, Bolsover, Derbyshire 1897 (restoration after fire)
- St Mary Magdalene's Church, Creswell, Derbyshire, 1899, 1913 (aisles) and 1927 (tower)
- St Thomas' Church, Kirkby-in-Ashfield, Nottinghamshire 1901-03
- Langwith Lodge, Nether Langwith, Nottinghamshire 1904
- The Wriothesley Tomb, St Peter's Church, Titchfield, Hampshire 1905 (restoration)
- St John the Evanglist's Church, Kirkby Woodhouse 1905-06
- Godber Memorial Church Hall, Ogle Street, Hucknall Torkard 1906-07
- St Wilfrid's Church, Kirkby-in-Ashfield, Nottinghamshire 1907-08
- St Michael and All Angels’ Church, Outram Street, Sutton-in-Ashfield, Nottinghamshire 1909 (addition of nave and west tower)
- Conservative Club, Drighlington 1910
- St Alban's Church, Forest Town 1910-11
- St Winifred's Church, Holbeck, Nottinghamshire 1913-16 and Lych Gate
- War memorial Sutton-in-Ashfield 1921 originally at St Michael and All Angels' Church, Outram Street, now moved to the junction of Downing Street with Mansfield Road.
