= Lenton Abbey =

Coordinates: 52.936°N 1.211°W

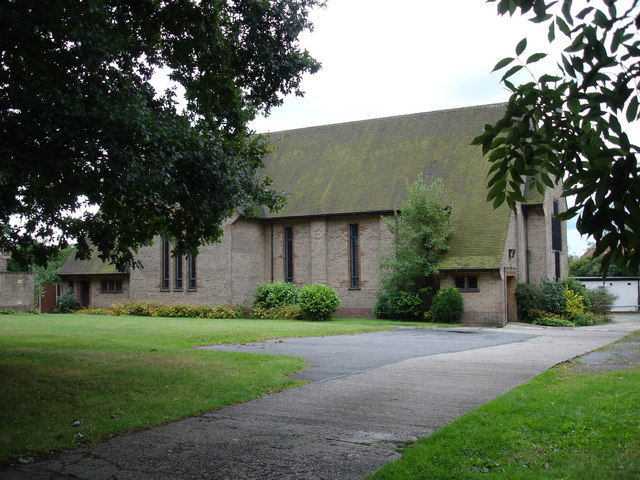
- St. Barnabas' Church, Lenton Abbey

- Location within Nottinghamshire
- Population: 2,064
- OS grid reference: SK 53022 37948
- Unitary authority: Nottingham
- Ceremonial county: Nottinghamshire
- Region: East Midlands
- Country: England
- Sovereign state: United Kingdom
- Post town: NOTTINGHAM
- Postcode district: NG9
- Dialling code: 0115
- Police: Nottinghamshire
- Fire: Nottinghamshire
- Ambulance: East Midlands
- UK Parliament: Nottingham West

Lenton Abbey is a large housing estate, forming a neighbourhood in Nottingham, close to Wollaton, Beeston and the University of Nottingham.

== History ==
Originally a farming village, Lenton Abbey took its name from the main farm, itself named in reference to nearby Lenton Priory.

In 1831, Lord Middleton of Wollaton Hall acquired the estate and leased it to a successful Nottingham lace merchant, Isaac Fisher. Later the estate was sold to the industrialists and mine owning family Readett-Bayley. Sir Henry Dennis Readett-Bayley was a war hero who, with financial support from other mine owners, founded the Dennis Bayley Fund to transport wounded soldiers to safety.

In 1925, the land was sold to the council for redevelopment as a large housing estate. A prominent former structure was the Essoldo cinema, and later a snooker hall designed in an Art Deco style by Alfred J. Thraves, a prominent local cinema architect. It had been demolished by 1994 and is now the site of an office block known as 'Priory Court.'

== Demographics ==
According to the data of the 2001 Census, the estate had a population of 2,064, and a majority of the population are aged 25–44 who make up 32.5% of the estate's population.

The census also shows that 74.7% of the population is White British, as well as 1.3% being White Irish and 4.7% being classed as Other White. 6.1% of the population is Mixed Race, 4.0% is Asian or Asian British and 6.0% is Black or Black British. 1.7% of the population is Chinese and other ethnic groups make up 1.0% of the estate's population.

Lenton Abbey is in the 'Wollaton East and Lenton Abbey' ward of Nottingham City Council. The ward is represented by Cllrs. Sam Webster and Sally Longford (both Labour).

== Facilities ==
The facilities of Lenton Abbey are located on Woodside Road. Facilities include some takeaways including Indian food, jamaican food and pizza, a diner and a butcher shop.

== Religion ==
The 2001 Census shows that 46.8% of the population is Christian and Atheists make up 32.8% of the estate's population. 4.7% of the population are Muslim, 1.0% are Sikh and 0.7% are Hindu. 0.1% of the population are Buddhist, other religions make up 0.5% of the estate's population and 13.0% did not state their religion.

St. Barnabas' Church, opened on 28 June 1938, was constructed at the request of the earliest residents of the newly built Lenton Abbey housing estate. The church is located on the A52 Derby Road and is of the Church of England.

== Bus services ==
There are frequent bus services operated by Nottingham City Transport that travel on Woodside Road and serve the area

Nottingham City Transport

■ 36: Nottingham → Derby Road → QMC → Lenton Abbey→ University West Gate → Beeston → Chilwell

== See also ==
- Lenton Priory
