= St Wilfrid's Church, Kirkby-in-Ashfield =

Church in Nottinghamshire, England

Coordinates: 53°05′50″N 01°16′08″W

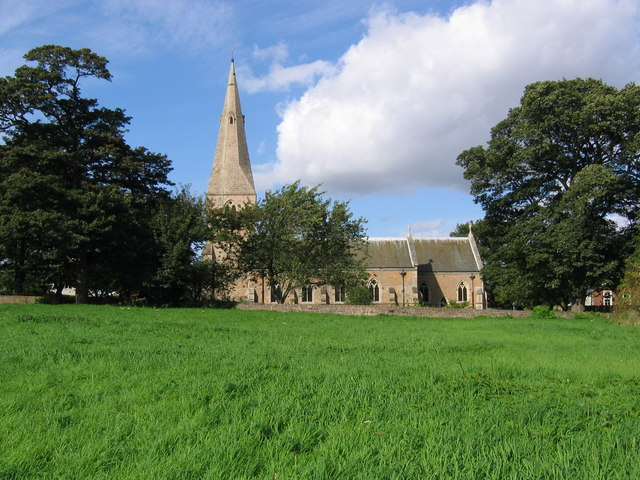
- St Wilfrid's Church, Kirkby-in-Ashfield
- Denomination: Church of England
- Churchmanship: Broad Church
- Website: https://www.stwilfridskirkby.org

History
- Dedication: St Wilfrid

Administration
- Province: York
- Diocese: Southwell and Nottingham
- Parish: Kirkby-in-Ashfield

St Wilfrid's Church, Kirkby-in-Ashfield is a parish church in the Church of England in Kirkby-in-Ashfield, Nottinghamshire. The church is Grade II listed by the Department for Digital, Culture, Media and Sport as it is a building of special architectural or historic interest.

== History ==
The medieval church was destroyed by fire and a new church was erected in 1907 by the Duke of Portland to a design by the architect Louis Ambler. The church has a fine reredos and chancel screen.

The church of St Wilfrid stands on a site believed to have been first used for a church in the 7th century and an ancient church is mentioned in the Domesday survey of 1086.

== See also ==
- Listed buildings in Kirkby-in-Ashfield
