= Forest Town, Mansfield =

Area of Mansfield, Nottinghamshire, England

Coordinates: 53.1526°N 1.1569°W

Forest Town
- Suburb
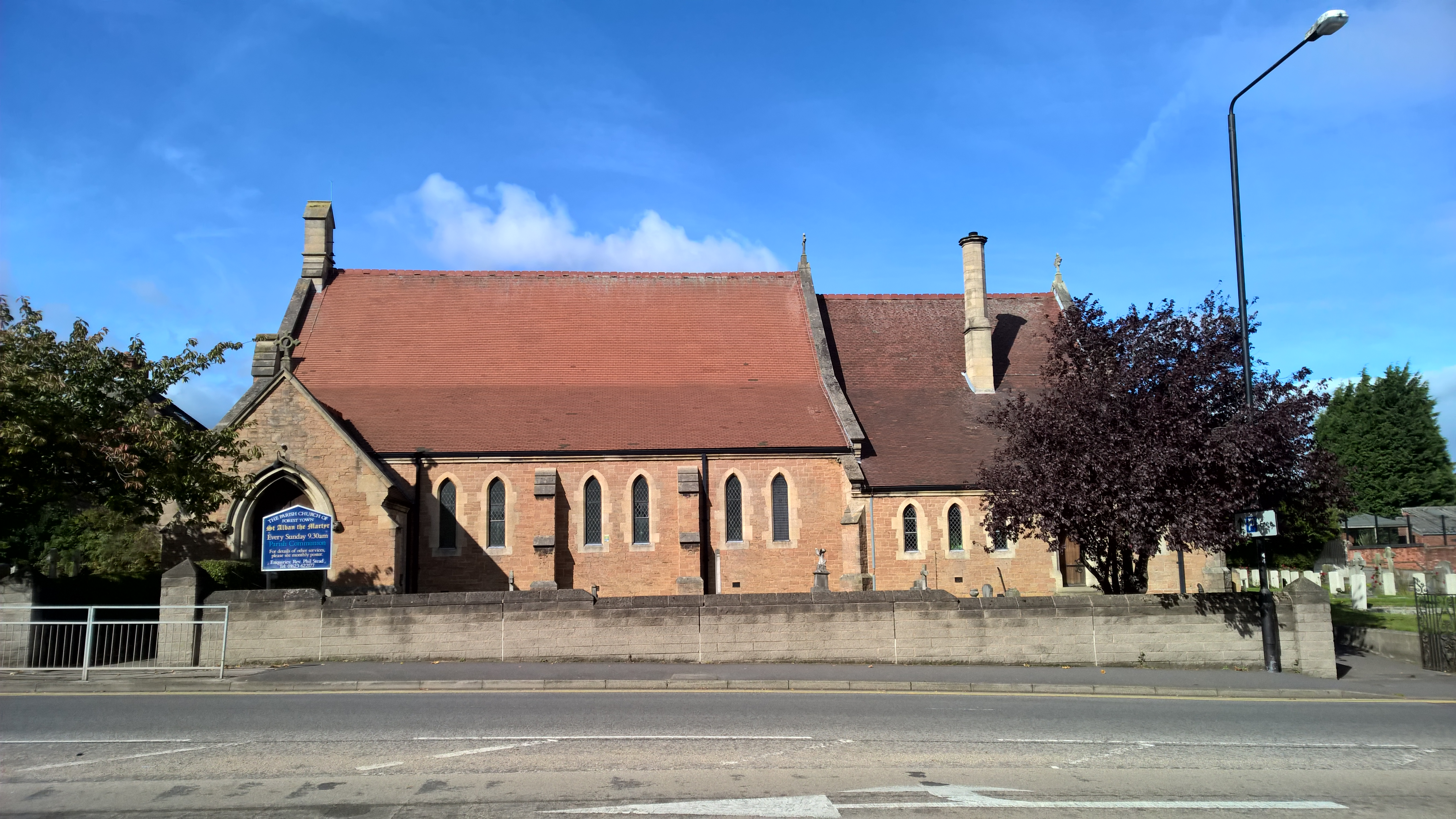
- St Albans the Martyr Church

- Location within Nottinghamshire
- Population: 11,812 (4 Wards. 2011))
- OS grid reference: SK564621
- District: Mansfield
- Shire county: Nottinghamshire
- Region: East Midlands
- Country: England
- Sovereign state: United Kingdom
- Post town: MANSFIELD
- Postcode district: NG19
- Dialling code: 01623
- Police: Nottinghamshire
- Fire: Nottinghamshire
- Ambulance: East Midlands
- UK Parliament: Mansfield

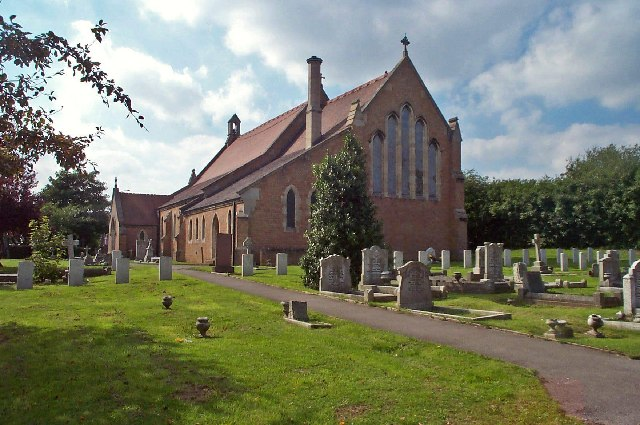
St Alban's Church, Forest Town on the crossroads

Forest Town is a suburb within Mansfield, Nottinghamshire, England. Forest Town used to be a village but after continuous development it is no longer a separate entity, nowadays being simply an area within Mansfield.

== History ==
An old part of Forest Town known as The Avenues is the high-density housing built as homes for the workers from the nearby Crown Farm Colliery (also known as 'Mansfield Colliery'), once a major employer. After closure of the coal mine in early 1988, the site has gradually been transformed to accommodate manufacturing in a variety of units on an industrial estate.

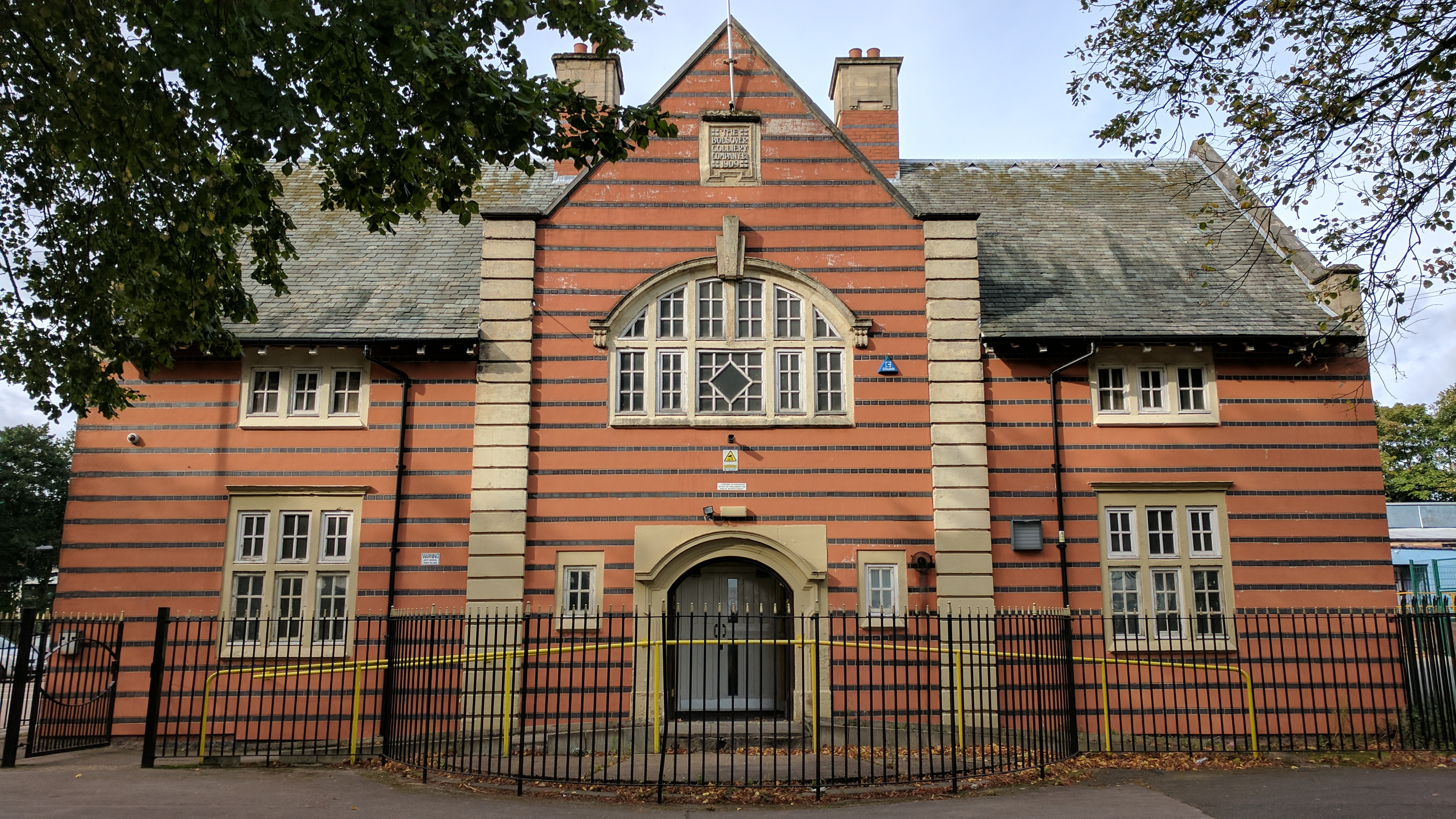
Kingsway Hall, Forest Town

A nearby development was the fabric manufacturing factory built on heathland, a greenfield development site, by the Japanese organisation Toray. This occurred amidst much publicity – with Toray stating during local recruitment in three phases, 1992–93 that their mission was to become Mansfield's finest Corporate Citizen. By the 2000s the size of the workforce had been considerably reduced.

The manufacturing processes abstract large-volumes of underground fresh water from nearby bore-holes and discharge foul water into the local sewer system operated by Severn Trent Water, whilst the boilers are fuelled by methane gas from the old coal mine workings 400m below the factory.

The B6030 main road through Forest Town has small shops, a post office, a small supermarket, with the Miners' Welfare, sports ground and cycle track just behind, opposite to St Alban's Church.

The Samworth Church Academy (formerly known as Sherwood Hall) is the nearest secondary school and The Garibaldi School further out in Clipstone are within the normal catchment area.

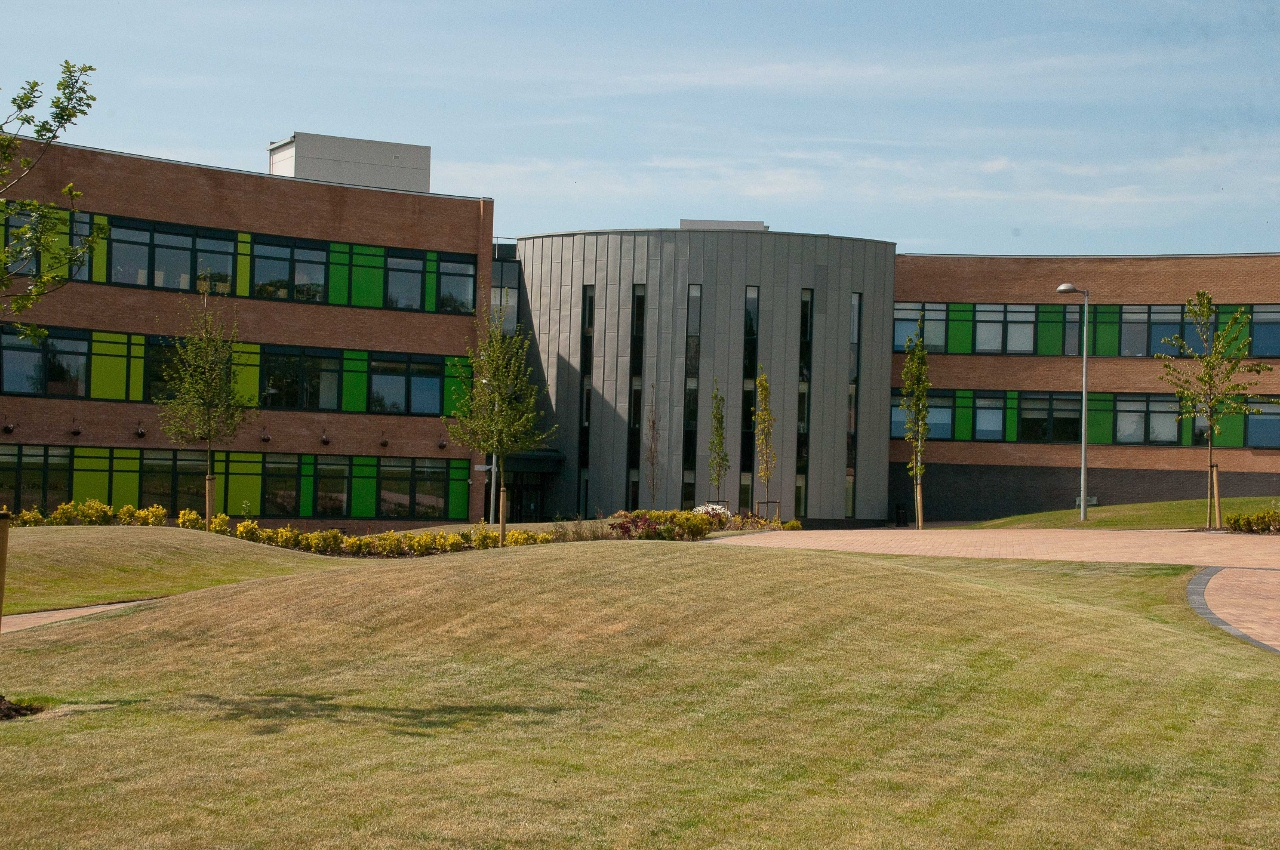
Samworth Church Academy, Forest Town

The area was split into two wards, Forest Town East and West but following the re-organisation implemented by Mayor Tony Egginton in time for the 2011 elections, Forest Town now falls within four ward areas; the main sections are within Holly, Kingsway and Newlands, whilst a smaller area encroaches into Maun Valley.

In 1998, William and Patricia Wycherley were murdered by their daughter and son-in-law, Susan and Christopher Edwards. They were buried in the back garden of their home in Forest Town and laid undiscovered until October 2013.

At the 2001 census, the population of these wards was 11,194, rising to 11,812 at the 2011 census, although it was only 8,288 using older boundary data.

Local football club A.F.C. Mansfield play at the Forest Town Stadium.
