= East Drayton =

Coordinates: 53.26°N 0.84°W

- Civil parish
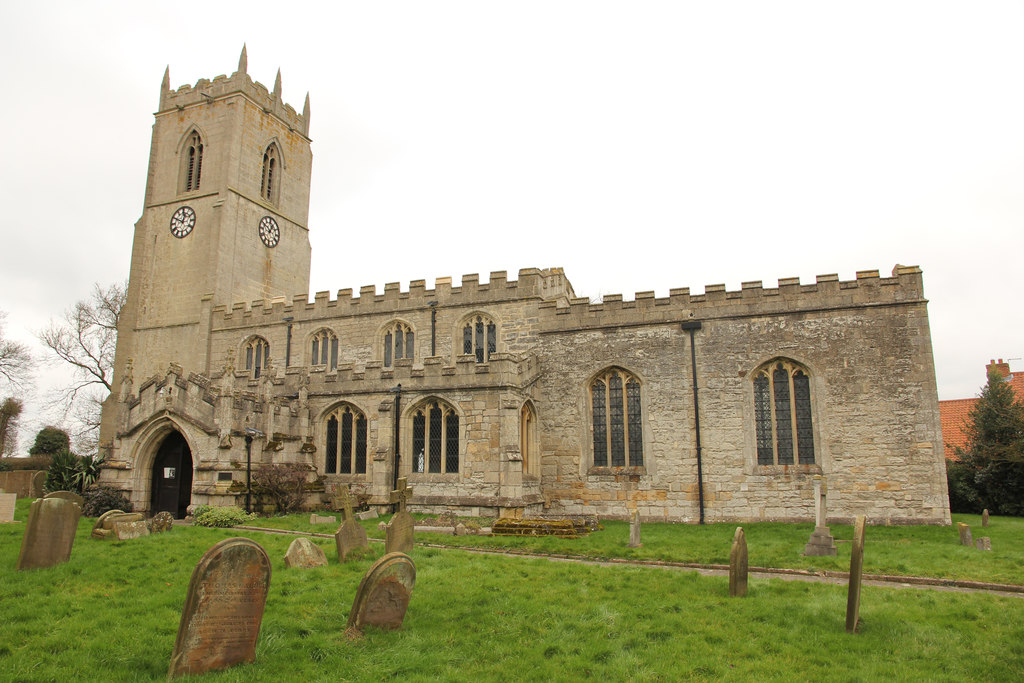
- St.Peter's church

- Location within Nottinghamshire
- Interactive map of East Drayton
- Area: 2.42 sq mi (6.3 km^{2})
- Population: 266 (2021)
  - Density: 110/sq mi (42/km^{2})
- OS grid reference: SK775751
  - London: 125 mi (201 km) SE
- District: Bassetlaw
- Shire county: Nottinghamshire
- Region: East Midlands
- Country: England
- Sovereign state: United Kingdom
- Post town: RETFORD
- Postcode district: DN22
- Dialling code: 01777
- Police: Nottinghamshire
- Fire: Nottinghamshire
- Ambulance: East Midlands
- UK Parliament: Newark
- Website: www.eastdrayton-pc.gov.uk

East Drayton is a village in Nottinghamshire, England. According to the 2001 census it had a population of 212, increasing to 252 at the 2011 Census, and 266 in 2021. It is located 3 miles west of Dunham-on-Trent. The parish church of St Peter and St Paul is 13th or 14th century in date. Nicholas Hawksmoor the architect was born here.

East Drayton was originally known simply as Drayton, and was recorded under that name in the Domesday Book of 1086. "East" was added to distinguish the place from the village of West Drayton, 4 miles west.

A windmill was recorded at East Drayton in 1712, a post mill with a full-width enclosed porch and porthole-like windows with shutters. It was possibly moved here from Lincolnshire.

The village has a typical English pub with a Scottish hint, it also has a village sports club with a Saturday Football team during the winter months and in the summer a Saturday and Sunday cricket team.

== Nicholas Hawksmoor ==
East Drayton (once called 'Great Drayton') is perhaps most important as the birthplace of the famous architect Nicholas Hawksmoor. Much about his early days is uncertain, including even when he was born. Only after he was 18 did his path become well known, and then he became most famous for his connection with London buildings including the famous 'face' of Westminster Abbey.

The most recent thinking places his birth in 1662, his father Nicholas was a husbandman at East Drayton. Hawksmoor's mother, unnamed, later remarried to a William Theaker, and the children took most of the Drayton property. Local belief is that this was Hardings Farm in Riddings Lane. It has been suggested he went to school in Dunham, though this is not really known for certain. He did, though, get work with Samuel Mellish who was a north Notts landowner with some land at East Drayton, and from there he met others who recognised his talents and encouraged him to re-locate to London.

In his will, which provides the best evidence for his links with the village, Hawksmoor left property at 'Great Drayton', Ragnall and Dunham, so he maintained some connection with the land of his birth. The will makes clear that his 'father in law' and his half-brother were living on his land at Drayton and could continue to use it. The will also laid down a condition that Hawksmoor's widow could go and live with them. After the death of his wife and daughter, lands at the three villages were to go to his brother William Theaker. William Theaker was wealthy enough to vote from East Drayton in 1722. A Benjamin Theaker was still a landowner at East Drayton in 1875 and one of the same name also owned land at Dunham in 1855. One Benjamin lived 1791–1868.

== See also ==
- Listed buildings in East Drayton
