= West Drayton, Nottinghamshire =

Village and civil parish in Nottinghamshire, England

Coordinates: 53.2635°N 0.9386°W

West Drayton
- Village and civil parish
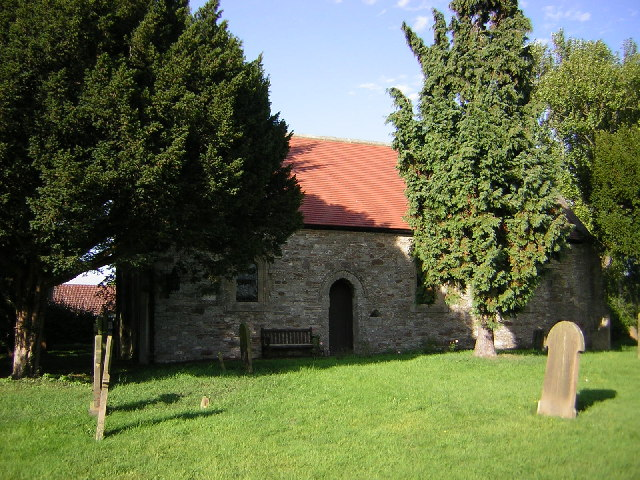
- St Paul's Church

- Location within Nottinghamshire
- Interactive map of West Drayton
- Area: 1.48 sq mi (3.8 km^{2})
- Population: 221 (2021)
  - Density: 149/sq mi (58/km^{2})
- OS grid reference: SK 709746
  - London: 125 mi (201 km) SSE
- Civil parish: West Drayton
- District: Bassetlaw
- Shire county: Nottinghamshire
- Region: East Midlands
- Country: England
- Sovereign state: United Kingdom
- Settlements: West Drayton; Rockley; Markham Moor
- Post town: RETFORD
- Postcode district: DN22
- Dialling code: 01777
- Police: Nottinghamshire
- Fire: Nottinghamshire
- Ambulance: East Midlands
- UK Parliament: Newark
- Website: www.gamstonwestdraytoneatonparishcouncil.co.uk

West Drayton is a village and civil parish in the Bassetlaw district in the county of Nottinghamshire, England. It lies 24 miles (39 km) north east of Nottingham and 4 miles (6.4 km) south of Retford.

In the census 2011, the parish had a population of 225, and this fell to 221 residents at the 2021 census. The parish includes the villages of Rockley and Markham Moor.

West Drayton was originally known simply as Drayton, and was recorded under that name in the Domesday Book of 1086. "West" was added to distinguish the place from the village of East Drayton, 4 miles east.

St Paul's Church dates back to the 12th century, but was rebuilt in 1874. It is a Grade II* listed building.

== See also ==
- Listed buildings in West Drayton, Nottinghamshire
