= Elkesley =

Coordinates: 53.27°N 0.97°W

- Village and civil parish
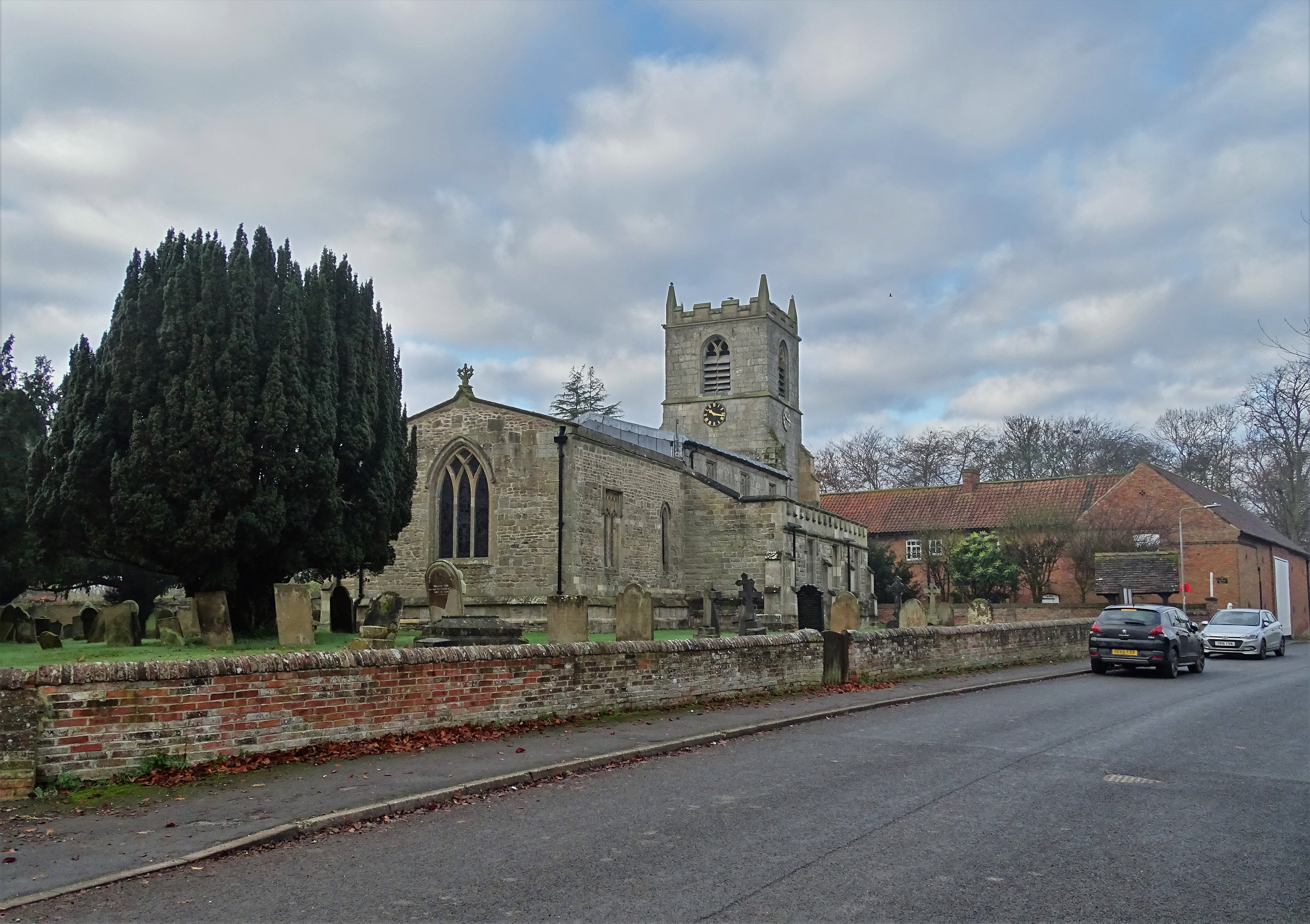
- St Giles Church

- Location within Nottinghamshire
- Interactive map of Elkesley
- Area: 4.15 sq mi (10.7 km^{2})
- Population: 852 (2021)
  - Density: 205/sq mi (79/km^{2})
- OS grid reference: SK688755
  - London: 125 mi (201 km) SE
- District: Bassetlaw
- Shire county: Nottinghamshire
- Region: East Midlands
- Country: England
- Sovereign state: United Kingdom
- Post town: RETFORD
- Postcode district: DN22
- Dialling code: 01623 / 01777
- Police: Nottinghamshire
- Fire: Nottinghamshire
- Ambulance: East Midlands
- UK Parliament: Bassetlaw
- Website: www.elkesleyvillage.org.uk

Elkesley is a village and civil parish in Nottinghamshire, England. According to the 2001 census it had a population of 805, increasing to 822 at the 2011 Census, and 852 in 2021. It is located 6 miles south of Retford.

The parish church of St Giles was built c. 1300 in Decorated style, and was partially reconstructed in 1845. There previously was a pub in Elkesley named the Robin Hood this is now demolished due to being unoccupied, in its place are now residential properties. However now, the little village consists of a small shop and a primary school, which in January 2008, 82 pupils attended.

== Toponymy ==
Elkesley seems to contain the Old English personal name, Ealac', + lēah (Old English) a forest, wood, glade, clearing; (later) a pasture, meadow., so 'Ealac's wood/clearing'.

== Geography ==
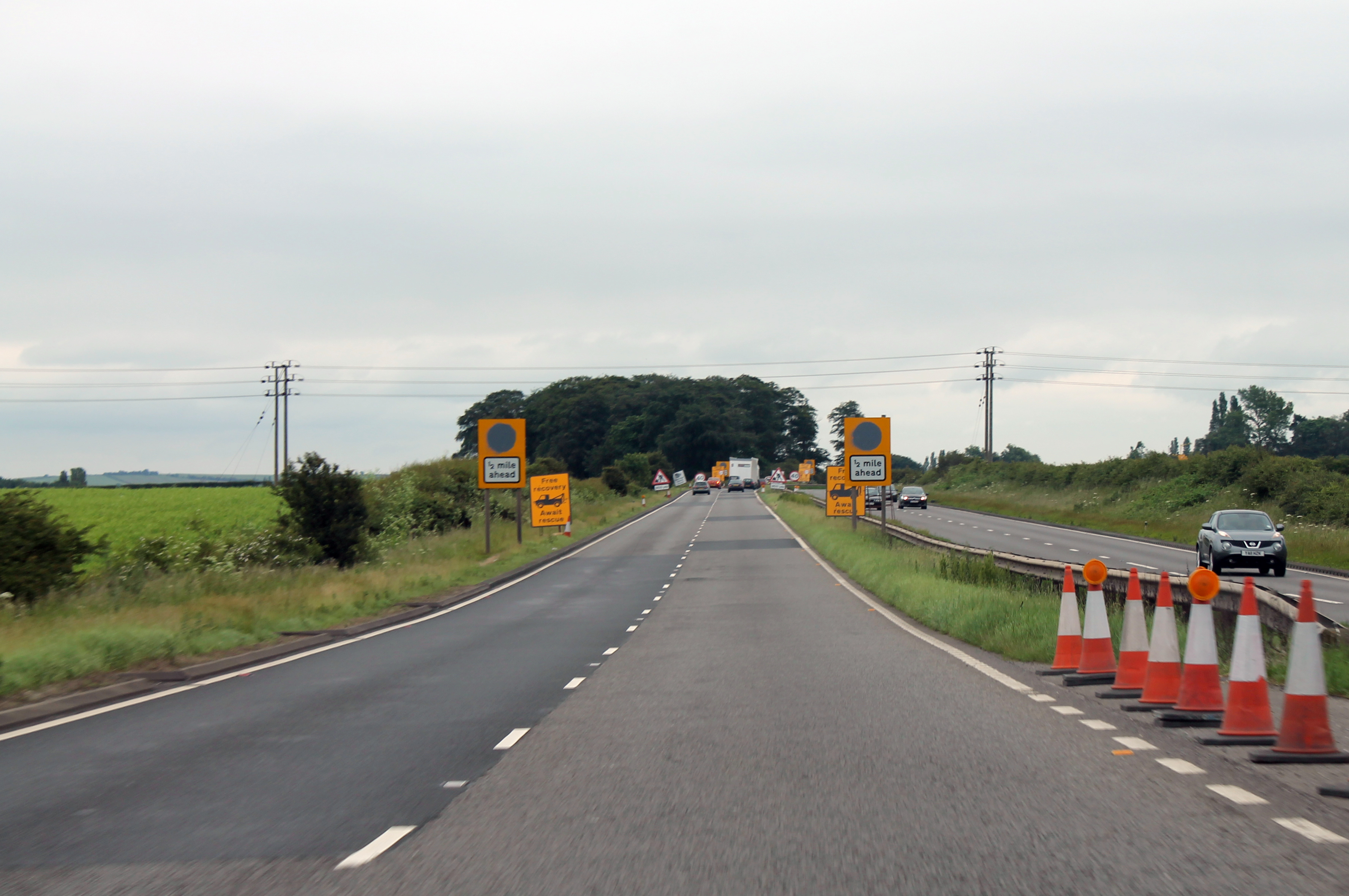
Bypass in June 2014

Th bypass was started from around early February 1936, being 80 ft wide, with two carriageways. In 1936, the route was merely referred to as the 'Worksop-Lincoln road' (A57). The bypass would eliminate five dangerous bends. The former A57 road was only 13 ft wide. Construction of the A57 bypass would take nine months, being funded by the national Road Fund. The Elkesley stretch was improved as it was viewed as a 'dangerous road'.

There would be a 1,300 yards extension to the east, with a bridge over the River Poulter, with the largest span being 80 yards wide. The extension would take 15 months, as it included a bridge. The bypass was completed by mid-September 1937. By early 1958 this had become the main north–south route, as part of the new Retford bypass via Apleyhead.

A Happy Eater opened on the northbound carriageway on 4 July 1985, which had a table licence; it had closed by 1996, and was raided by Nottinghamshire Police Vice Squad on 14 May 1998.

=== A1 road ===
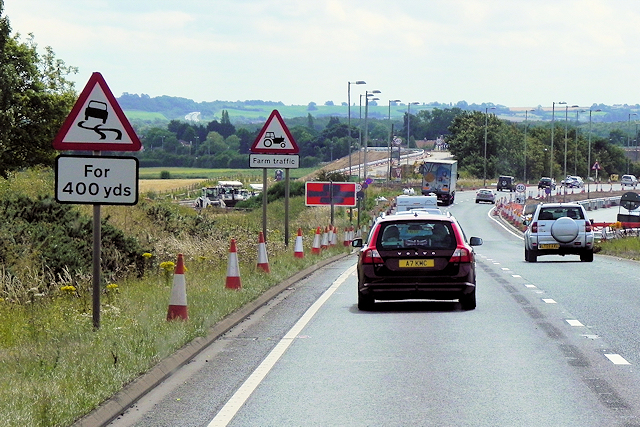
Construction in August 2015

Elkesley is highly unusual in that it is only accessible by a dual carriageway, the A1 road. The residents have been campaigning for a bridge for over twenty years.

The Highways Agency (HA) has acknowledged that access to and from the village is difficult and implemented a temporary speed limit of 50 mph in the 1990s. The HA started a consultation in 2005, with an exhibition held at Elkesley village hall in February 2008. A Public Inquiry was planned for 2010 but postponed pending the outcome of the Spending Review.

In 2013, construction began on a bridge connecting Elkesley to the A1 road. It opened in mid-late 2015.

== See also ==
- Listed buildings in Elkesley
