= Church of St Edmund, Mansfield Woodhouse =

Church in Nottinghamshire, England

Coordinates: 53.1633°N 1.1933°W

St Edmunds
- St Edmund King & Martyr
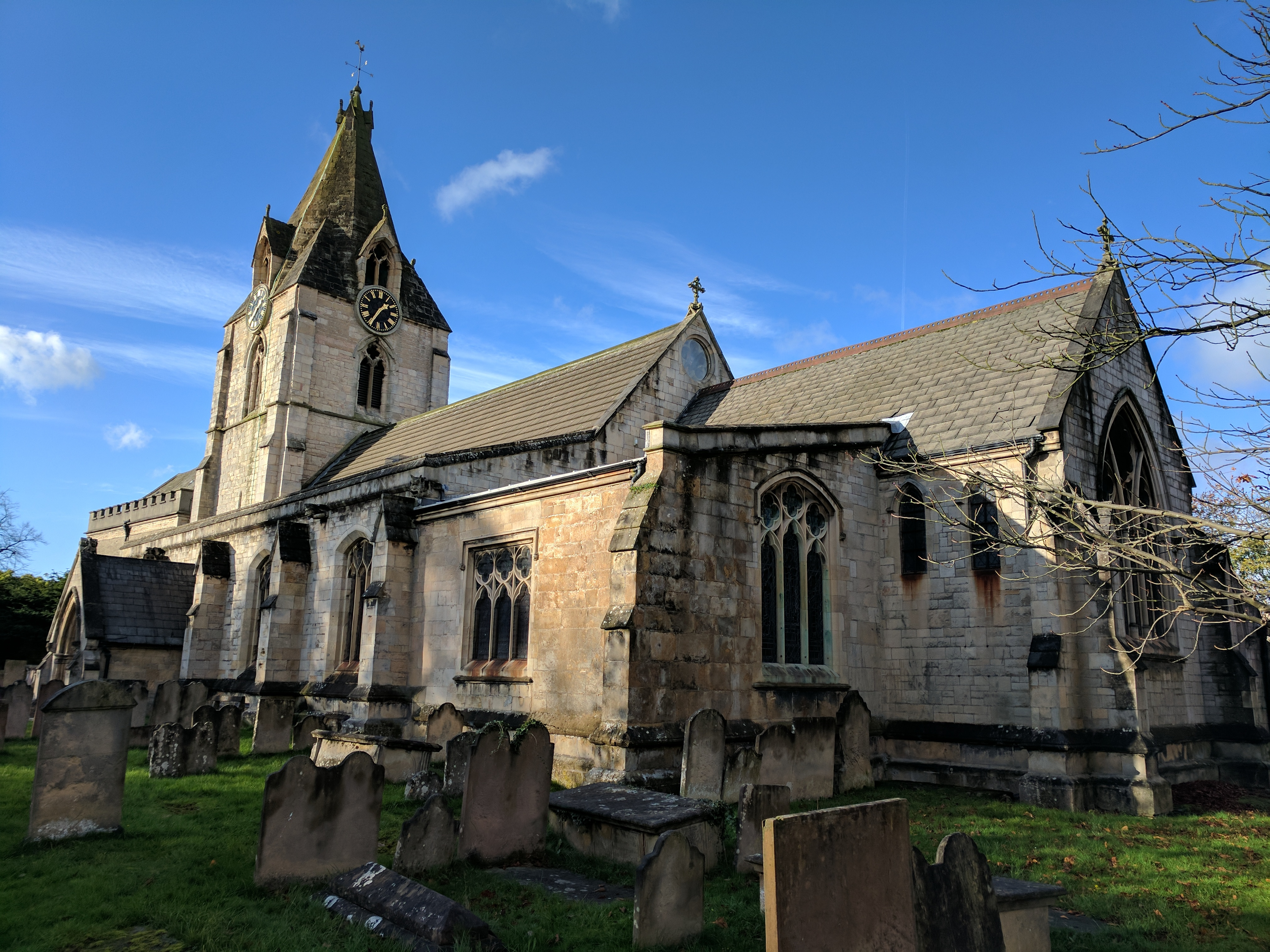
- Church of St Edmund, Mansfield Woodhouse

- Location in Nottinghamshire
- OS grid reference: SK 54017 63212
- Location: Church Street, Mansfield Woodhouse, Nottinghamshire
- Denomination: Church of England
- Churchmanship: Central
- Website: St. Ed's with St. Chad's

History
- Status: Parish church
- Dedication: Edmund the Martyr

Architecture
- Functional status: Active
- Heritage designation: Grade II* listed
- Designated: 28 January 1957
- Architectural type: Church
- Style: Gothic
- Groundbreaking: c. 1190

Specifications
- Materials: Stone, slate / lead roof

Administration
- Province: York
- Diocese: Southwell and Nottingham
- Archdeaconry: Newark
- Deanery: Mansfield
- Parish: Mansfield Woodhouse

Clergy
- Vicar: The Revd Andrew Porter

The Church of St Edmund (also known as St Edmund's or St Edmund King & Martyr) stands in the town of Mansfield Woodhouse, in Nottinghamshire, England. It is an active Church of England parish church in the deanery of Mansfield, the Archdeaconry of Newark, and the Southwell and Nottingham diocese. Its benefice has two churches — St Edmund's as the main parish church along with Church of St Chad, Pleasley Vale. The church is recorded in the National Heritage List for England as a designated Grade II* listed building.

St Edmund's Church is partnered with nearby St Edmund's C of E Primary School. In the 1980s the school moved to a site at Church Hill Avenue, Mansfield Woodhouse. The original building, on Welbeck Road leading down from the church, still stands and is Grade II listed. The Turner Memorial Hall, opposite the church on Church Street, serves as St Edmund's church hall, a community centre and headquarters of St Edmund's scout group.

== History ==
Although the church is not mentioned in the Domesday Book, it is possible that a wooden church existed at Mansfield Woodhouse in the 11th century which was destroyed by fire in 1180. A church, part timber and part local limestone, was built in 1190. A fire destroyed the village and much of the church in 1304. Work on rebuilding the church started soon after the fire in 1306. The fire is commemorated with an Appliqué wall hanging depicting the village and church burning (2004).

The church was reconstructed in 1804-1810 and subsequently heavily restored in 1847-1850. This restoration was traditionally attributed to George Gilbert Scott. Pevsner was not particularly impressed by the work, describing the result in the Nottinghamshire volume of his Buildings of England series as, "neither original nor sensitive". He took particular exception to the spire of the tower, calling it "very odd" and noting the lucarne windows were "so tiny that they look from a distance like a spikey finial".

Pevsner followed tradition and ascribed the building's mid-19th century reconstruction to Scott. During an assessment of the pews in St Edmund's Church by Historic England in 2007, the nineteenth century restorations of the building were re-attributed to W B Moffatt and T C Hine, rather than to Scott.

== External features ==
The churchyard surrounds the church on all four sides, with numerous mature trees and stone boundary walls to all sides. The boundary wall facing Church Street is Grade II listed. The churchyard contains three gravestones and a sarcophagus which are all Grade II listed. The First World War memorial linked to the church also has a Grade II listing and stands opposite the church on Priory Road at the entrance to Yeoman Hill Park.

== Gallery ==
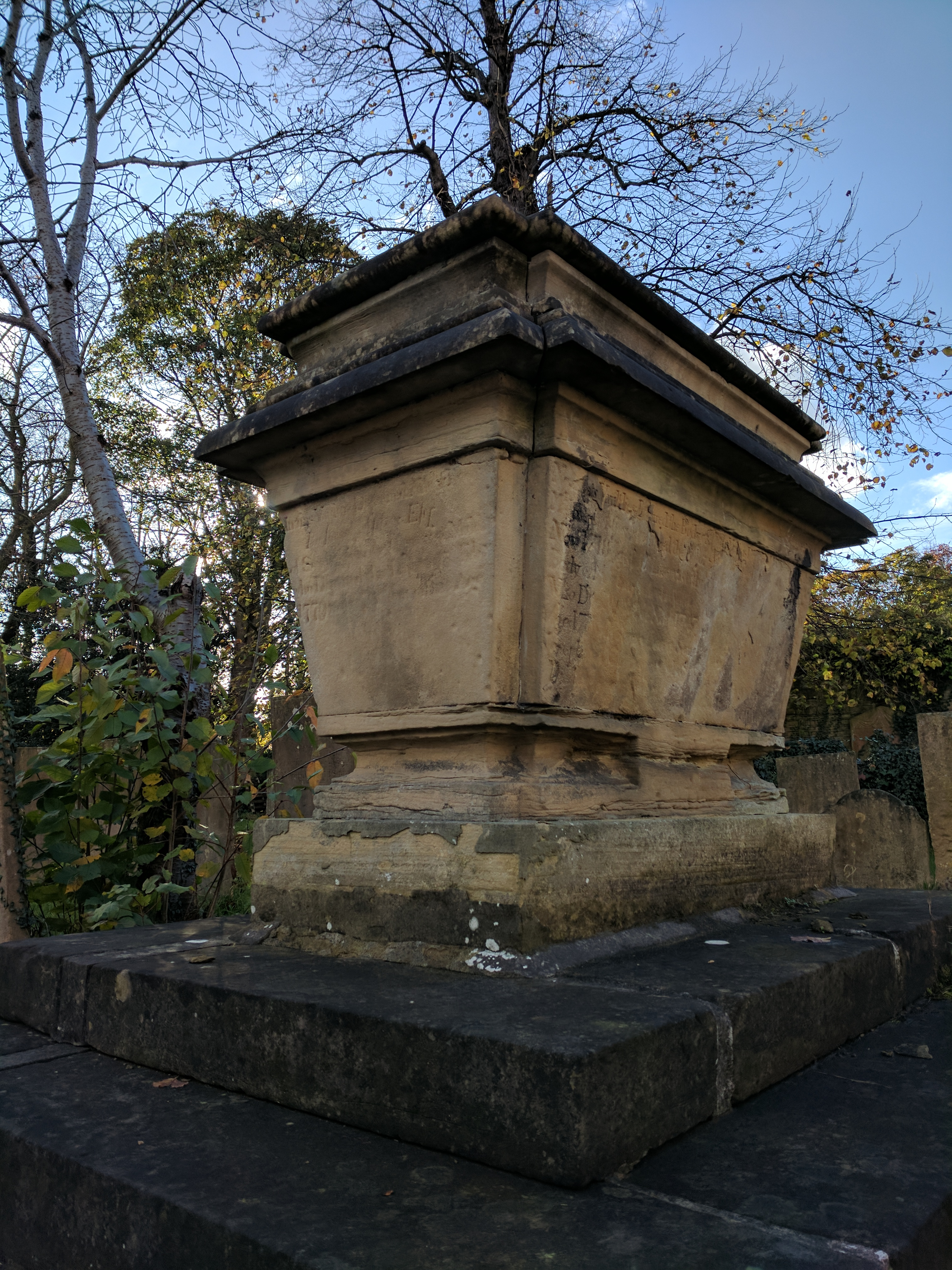
Sarcophagus 10 metres south of south porch

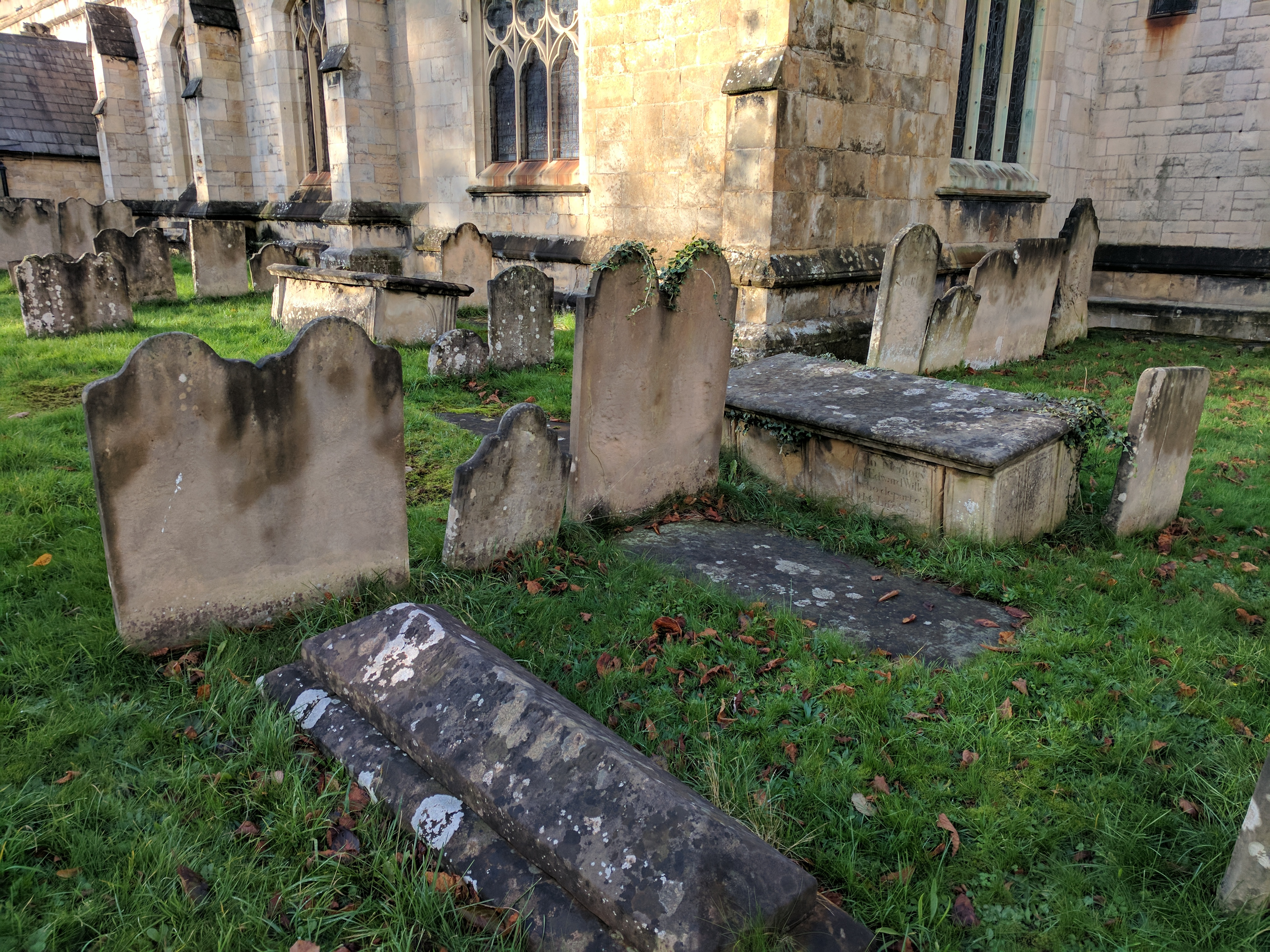
Headstone 3 metres south of Lady Chapel

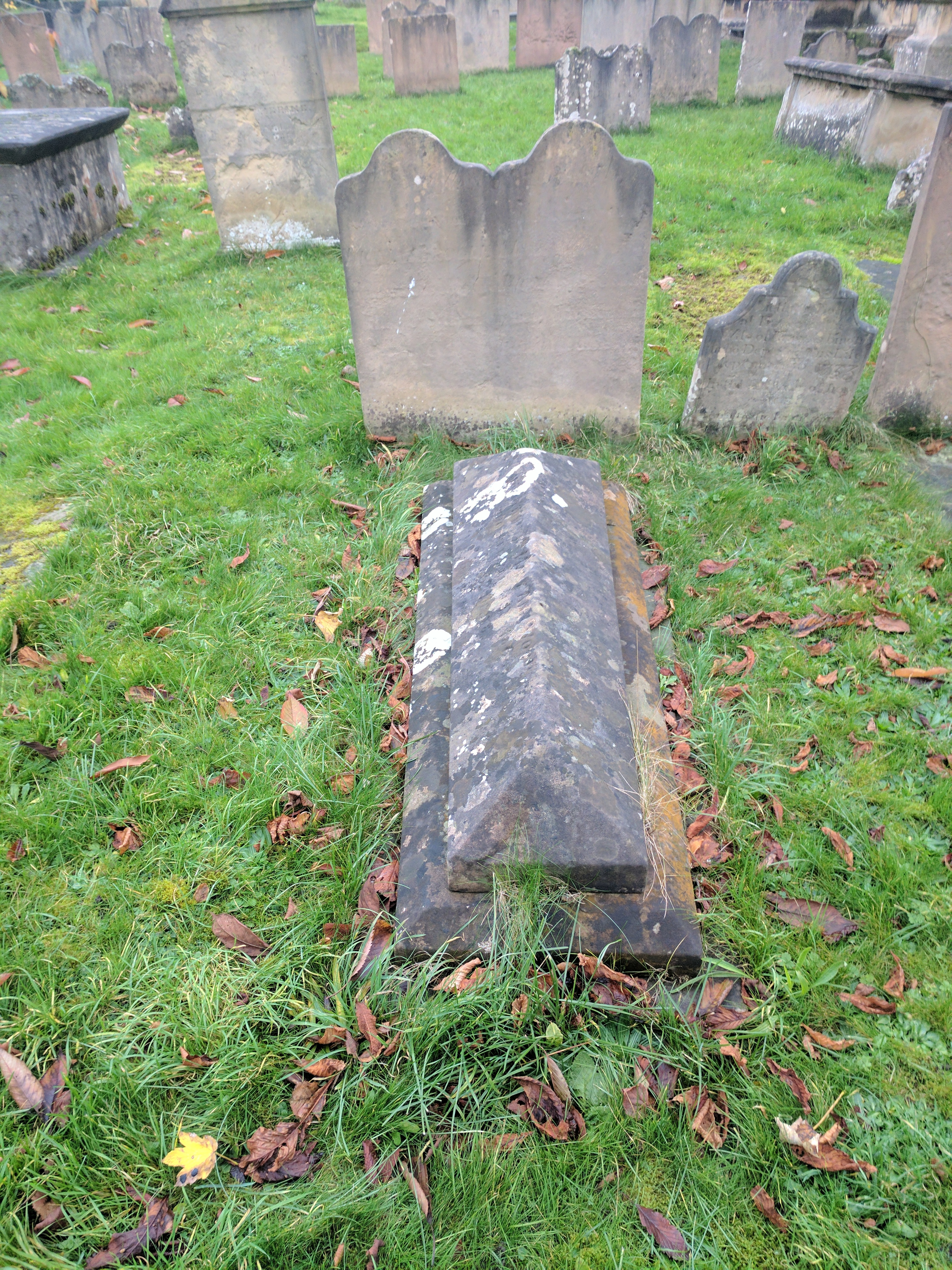
Headstone and chest tomb 10 metres south of chancel

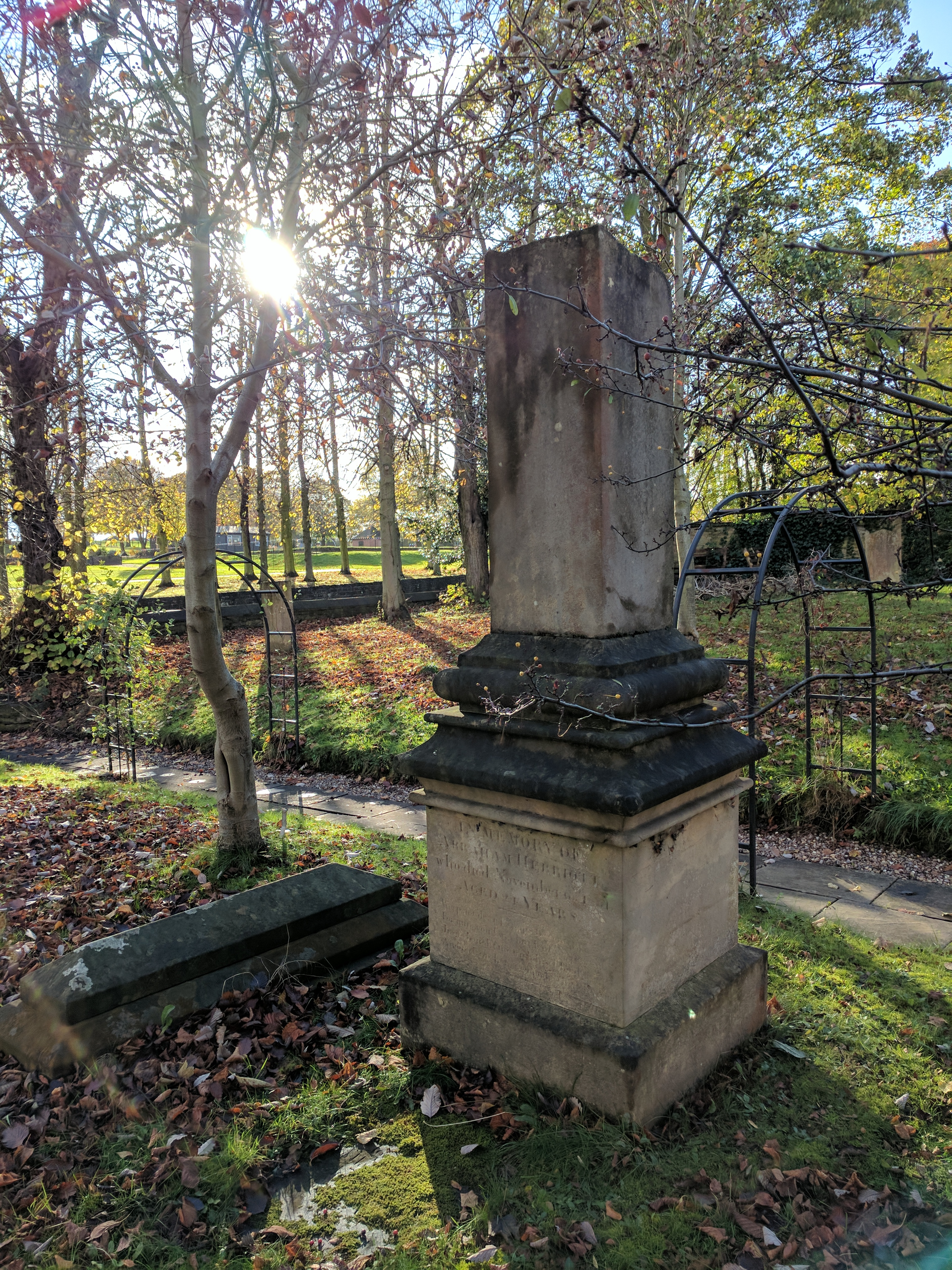
Headstone 28 metres south of chancel

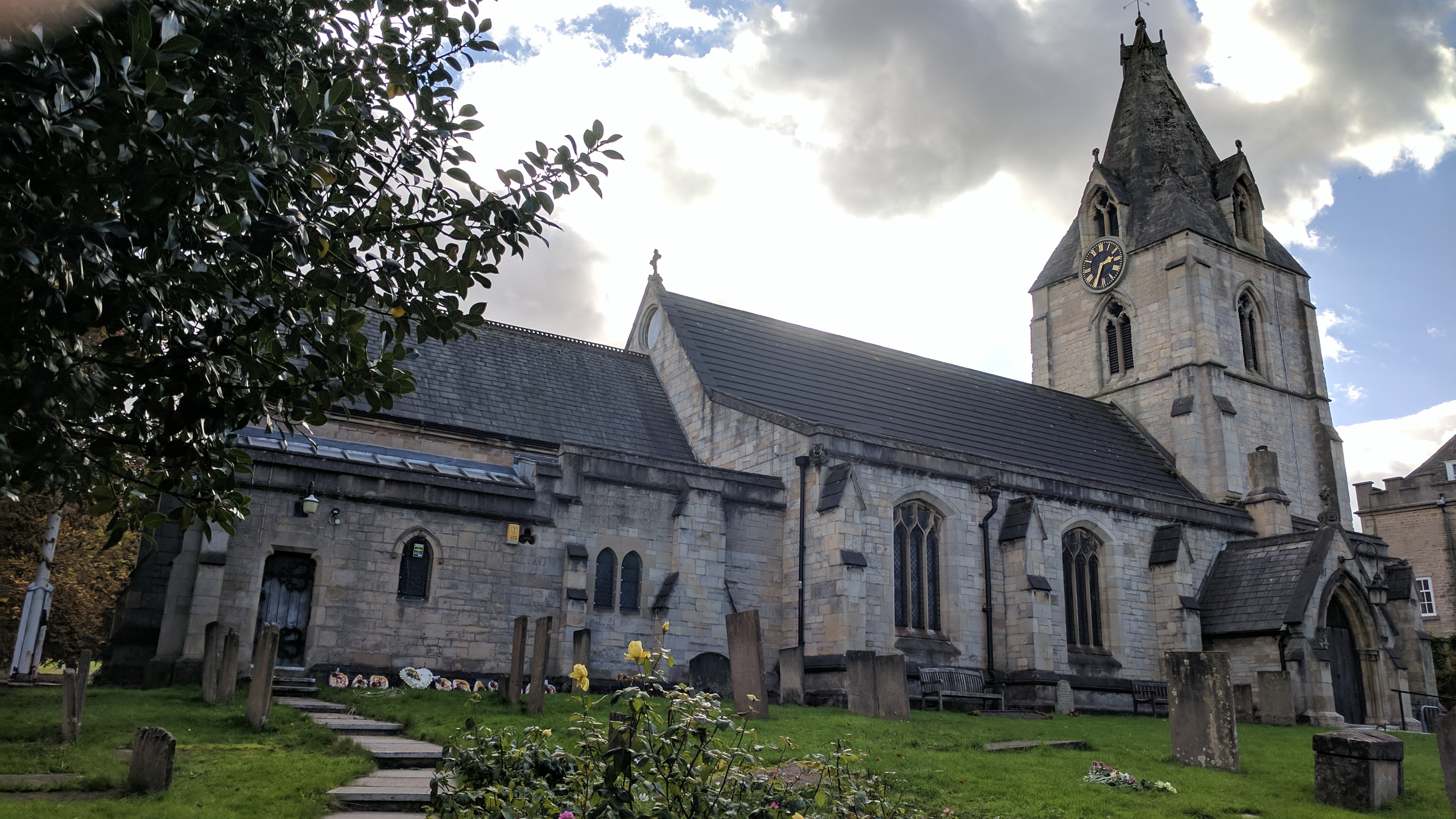
View from Old Manor Road

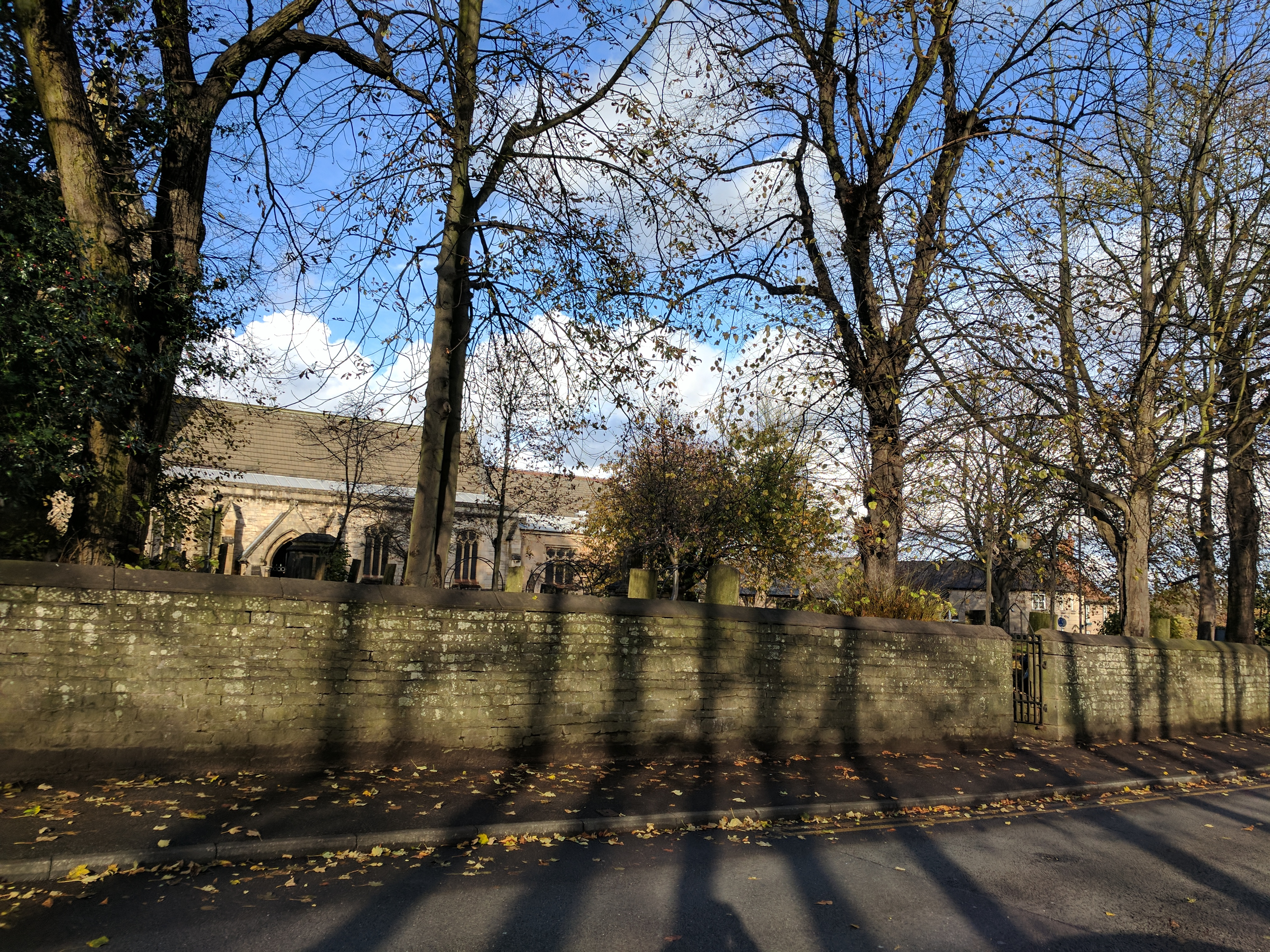
Boundary wall on Priory Road

== See also ==
- Grade I listed buildings in Nottinghamshire
- Grade II* listed buildings in Nottinghamshire
- Listed buildings in Mansfield (outer areas)

== Sources ==
- Pevsner, Nikolaus; Williamson, Elizabeth (1979). Nottinghamshire. The Buildings of England. London, UK: Penguin. ISBN 0-14-071002-7.
