= St Mark's Church, Mansfield =

Coordinates: 53.1384°N 1.1977°W

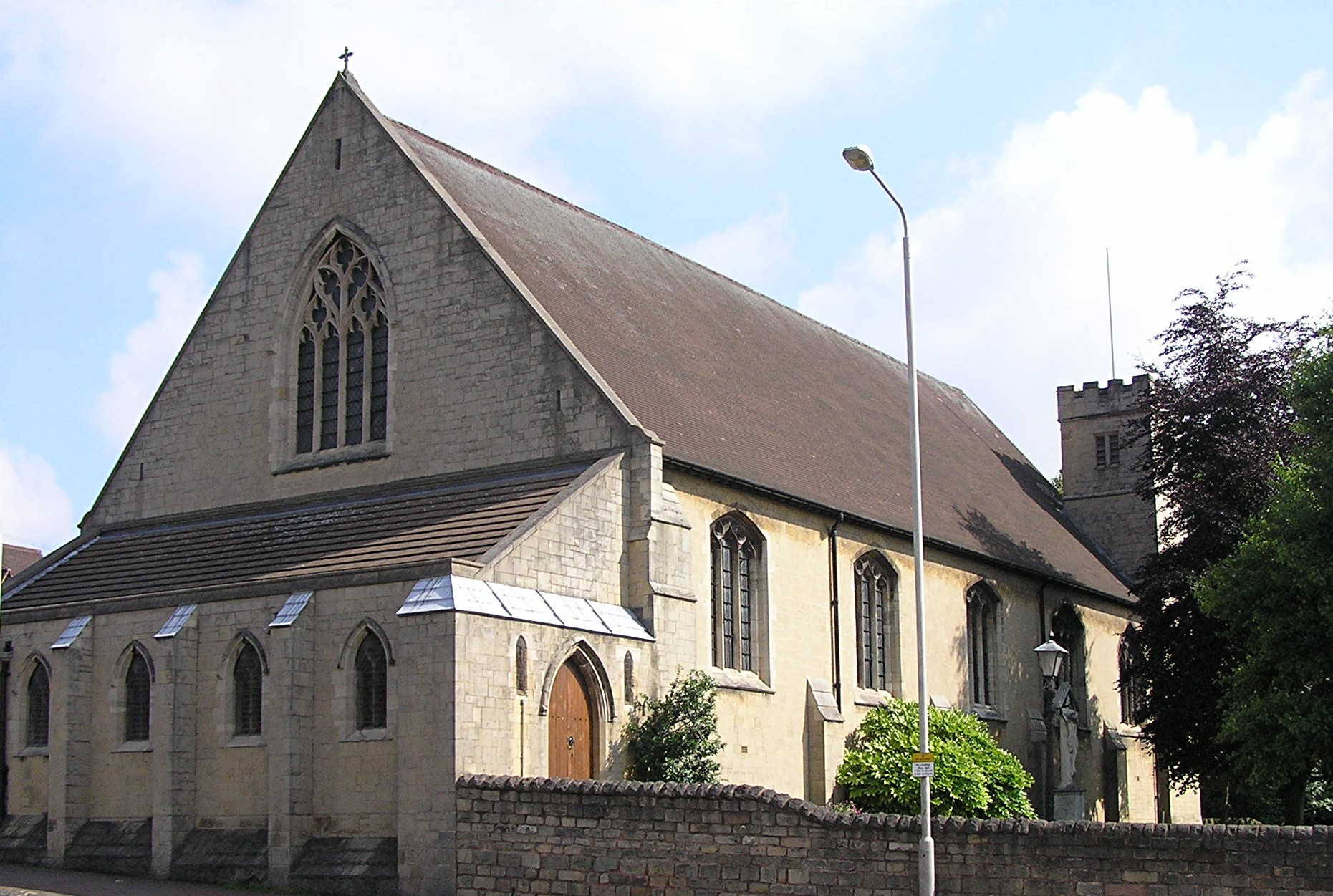
- A view from Nottingham Road

- Location in Nottinghamshire
- OS grid reference: SK 53770 60448
- Location: Nottingham Road, Mansfield, Nottinghamshire
- Country: England
- Denomination: Church of England
- Churchmanship: High Church / Affirming Catholic
- Website: stmarksmansfield.org.uk

History
- Status: Parish church
- Founded: 1897
- Dedication: St Mark

Architecture
- Functional status: Active
- Heritage designation: Grade II* listed
- Designated: 22 October 1986
- Architect: Temple Lushington Moore
- Architectural type: Church
- Style: Gothic

Specifications
- Materials: Stone, slate roof

Administration
- Province: York
- Diocese: Southwell and Nottingham
- Archdeaconry: Archdeaconry of Newark
- Deanery: Mansfield
- Parish: Mansfield

Clergy
- Vicar: Fr James Curry

St. Mark's Church is on Nottingham Road, Mansfield, Nottinghamshire, England. It is an active Church of England parish church in the deanery of Mansfield, the archdeaconry of Newark, and the Southwell and Nottingham diocese. The church is recorded in the National Heritage List for England as a designated Grade II* listed building.

Behind the church, the church hall is a Grade II listed building.

== History ==
St. Mark's church was built by the architect Temple Lushington Moore and opened in 1897.

== Stained glass ==
There are two stained glass windows by Charles Eamer Kempe at the west end.

== Organ ==
The organ dates from 1900 by the builders Brindley & Foster of Sheffield. It was renovated by Henry Willis and Sons in 1955, Midland Organ Builders in 1974 and more recently by Anthony Herrod. A complete re-build was finished in 2014 by Henry Groves.

== External features ==
In the churchyard, the war memorial and railings 1 metre south of St. Mark's Church is Grade II listed.

== Gallery ==
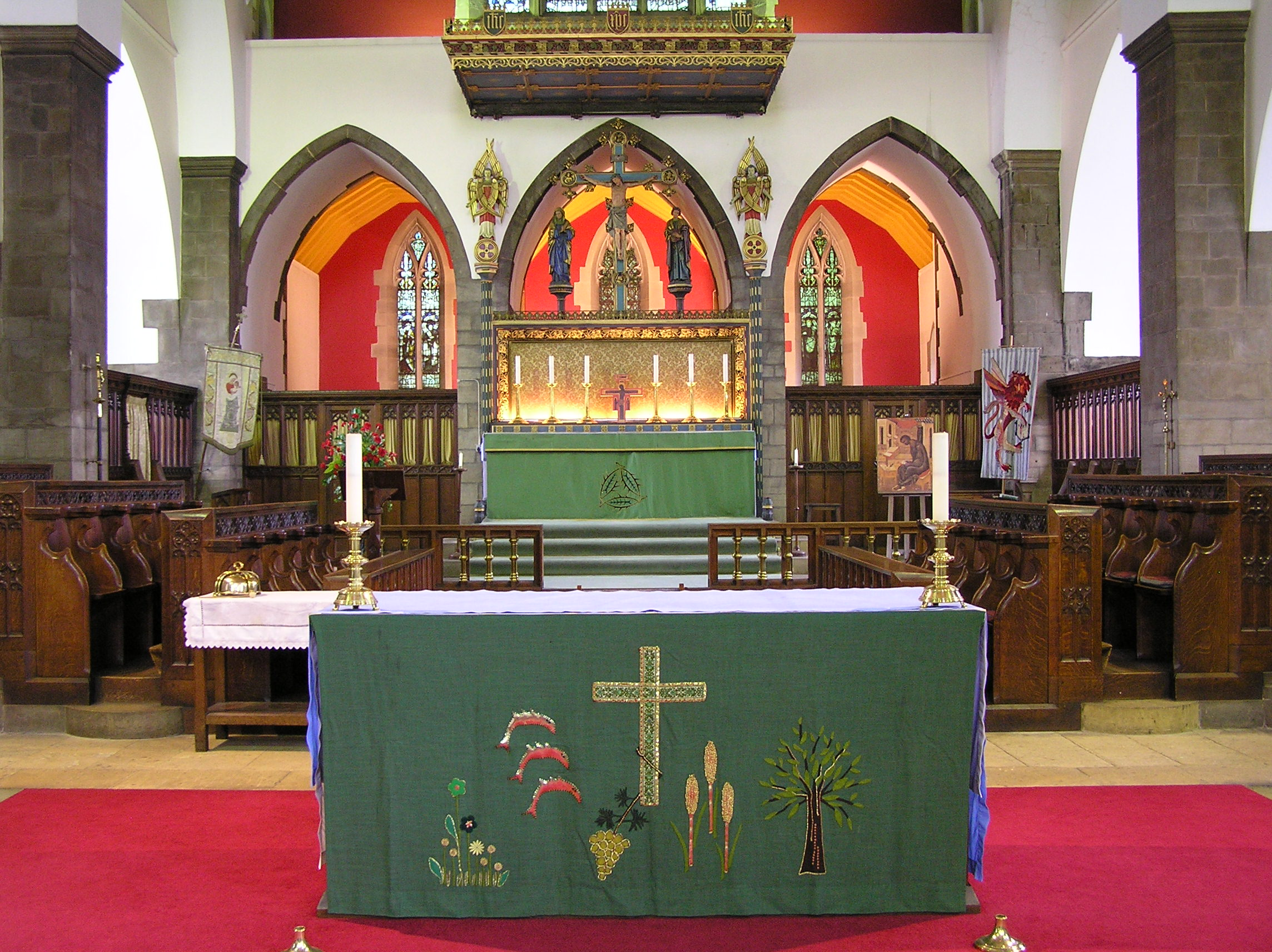
Interior with Trinity altar frontal

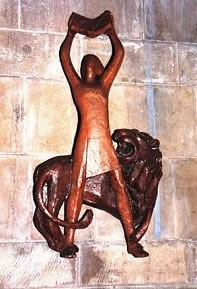
St. Mark and the Lion by sculptor Laurence Broderick

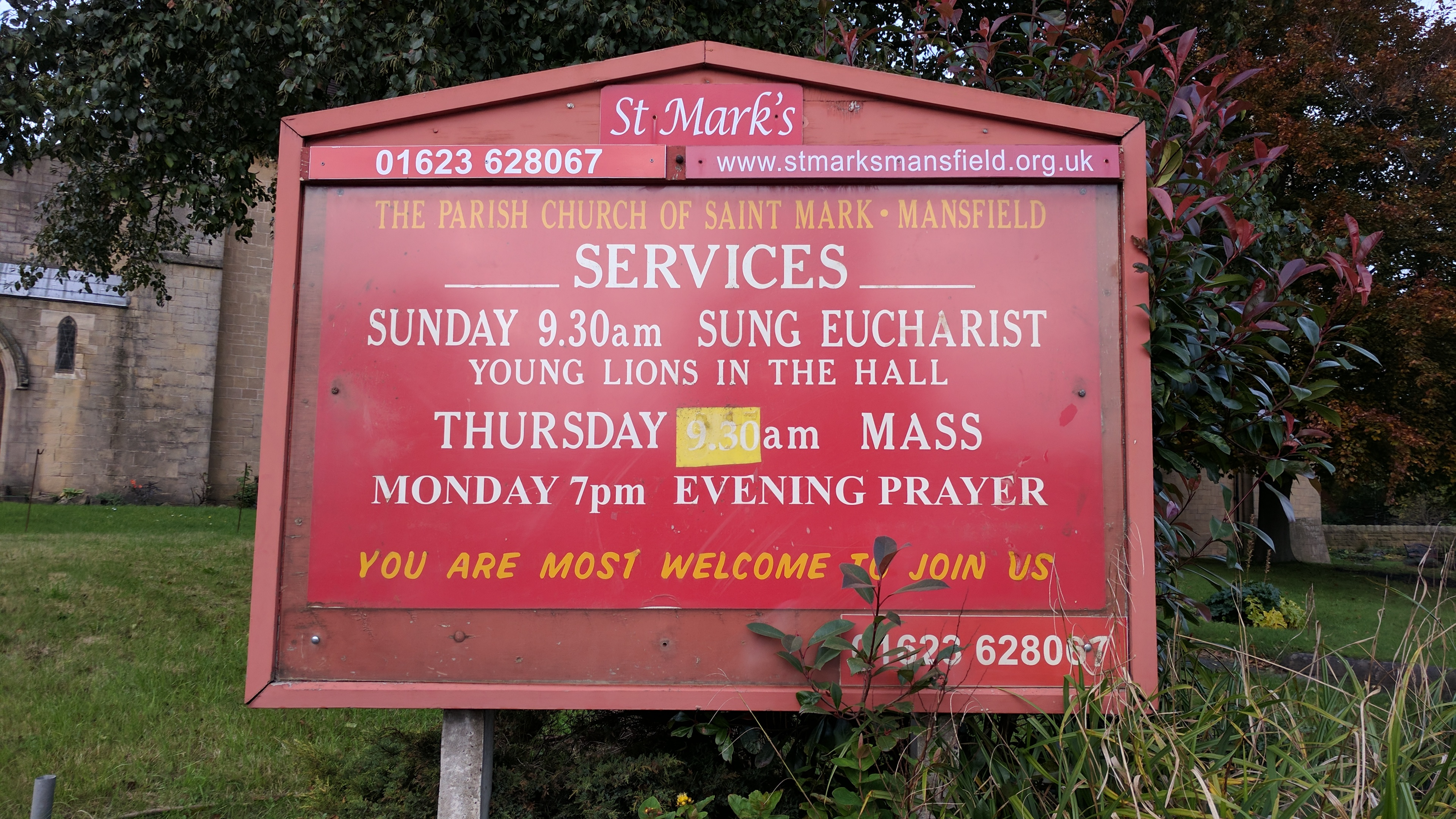
Sign

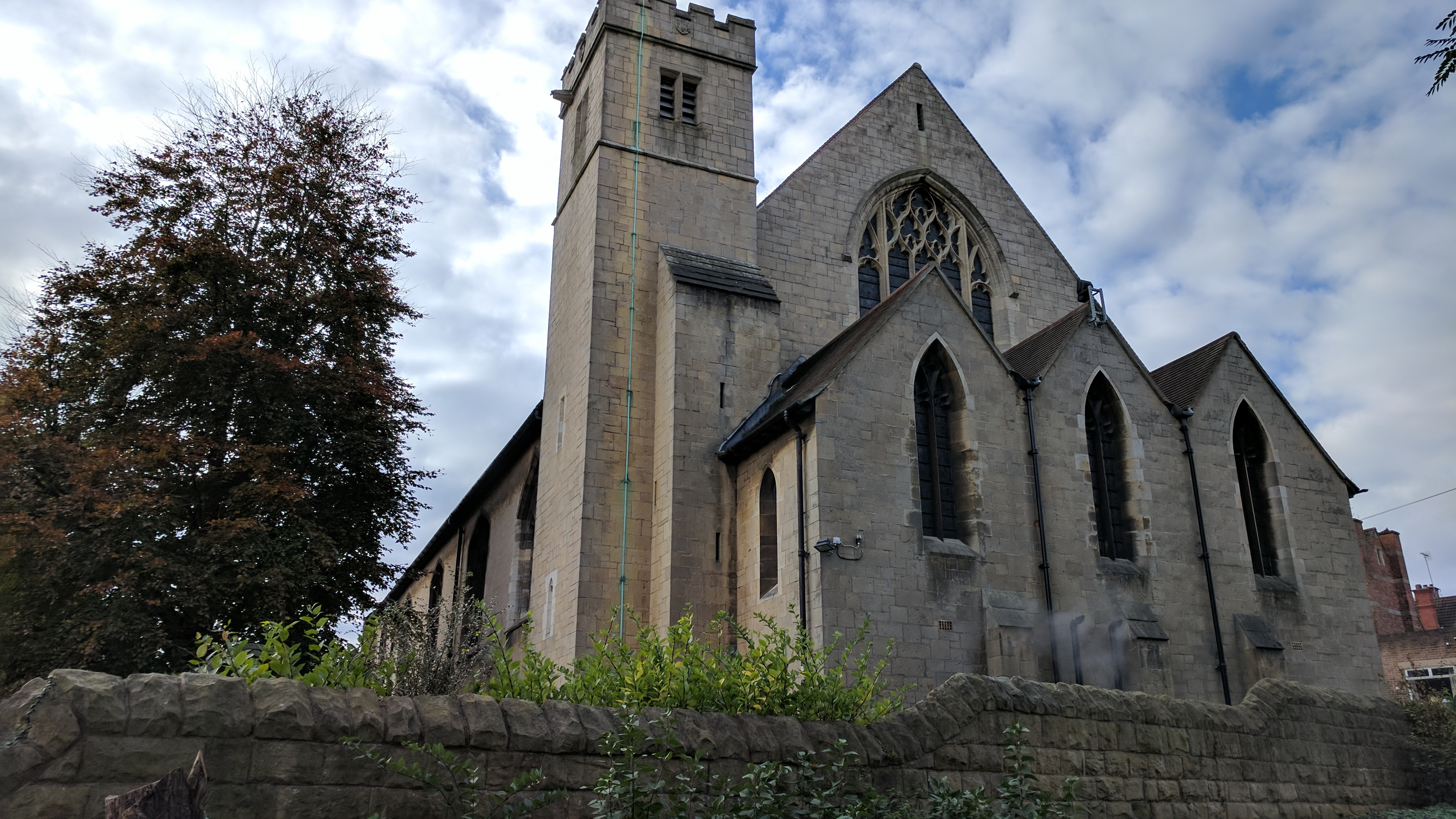
Exterior

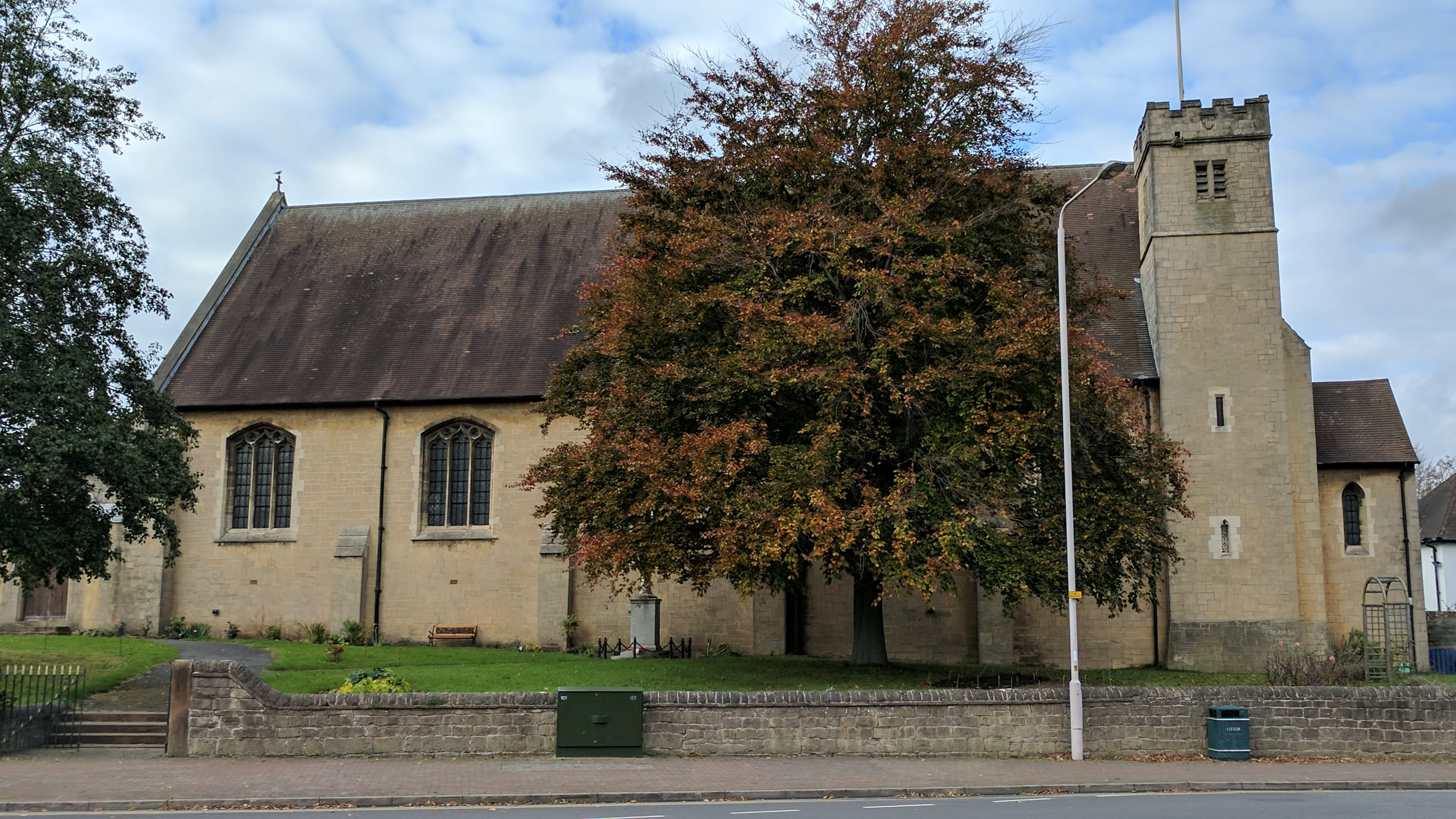
Exterior

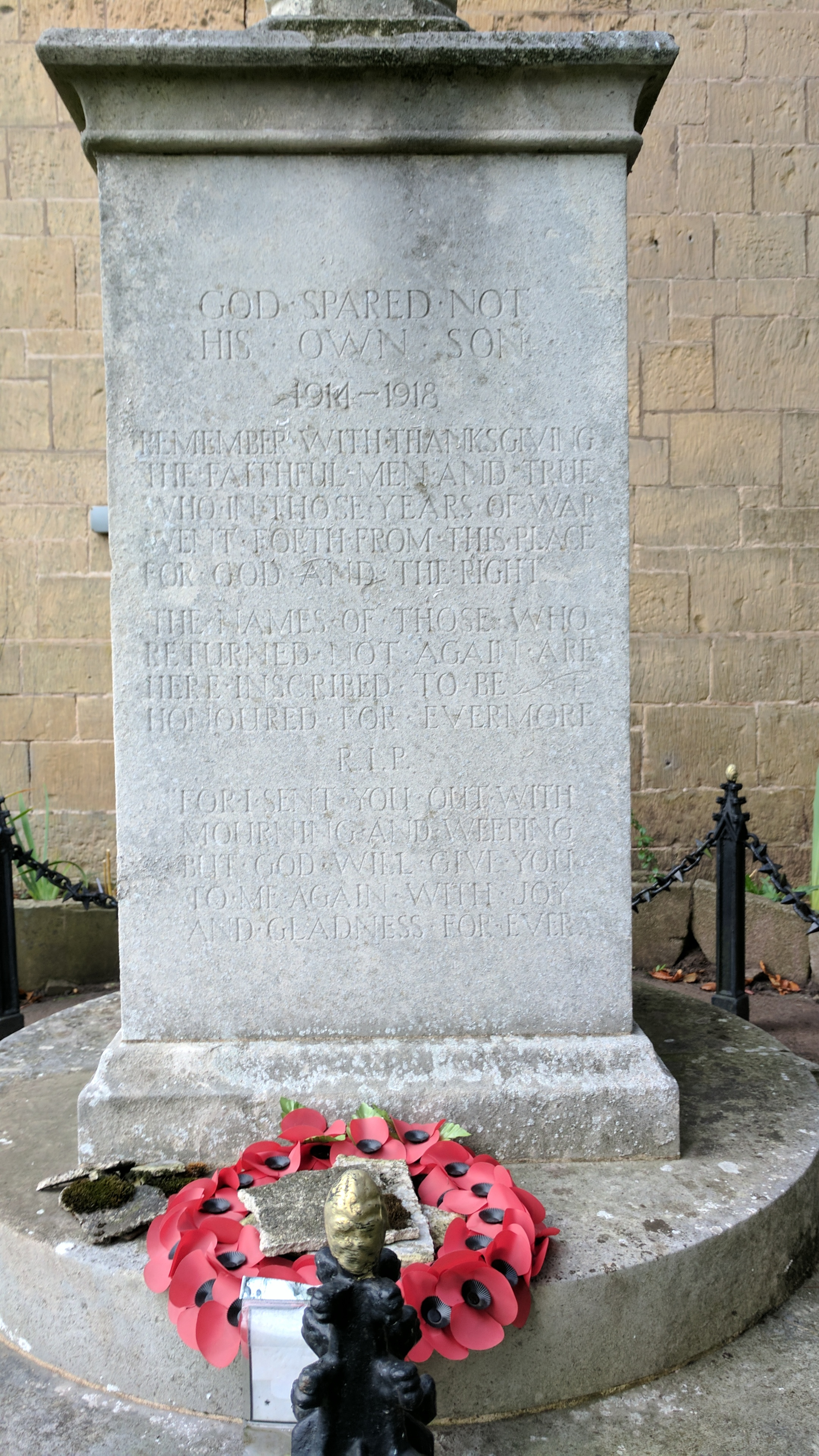
War memorial (Grade II listed)

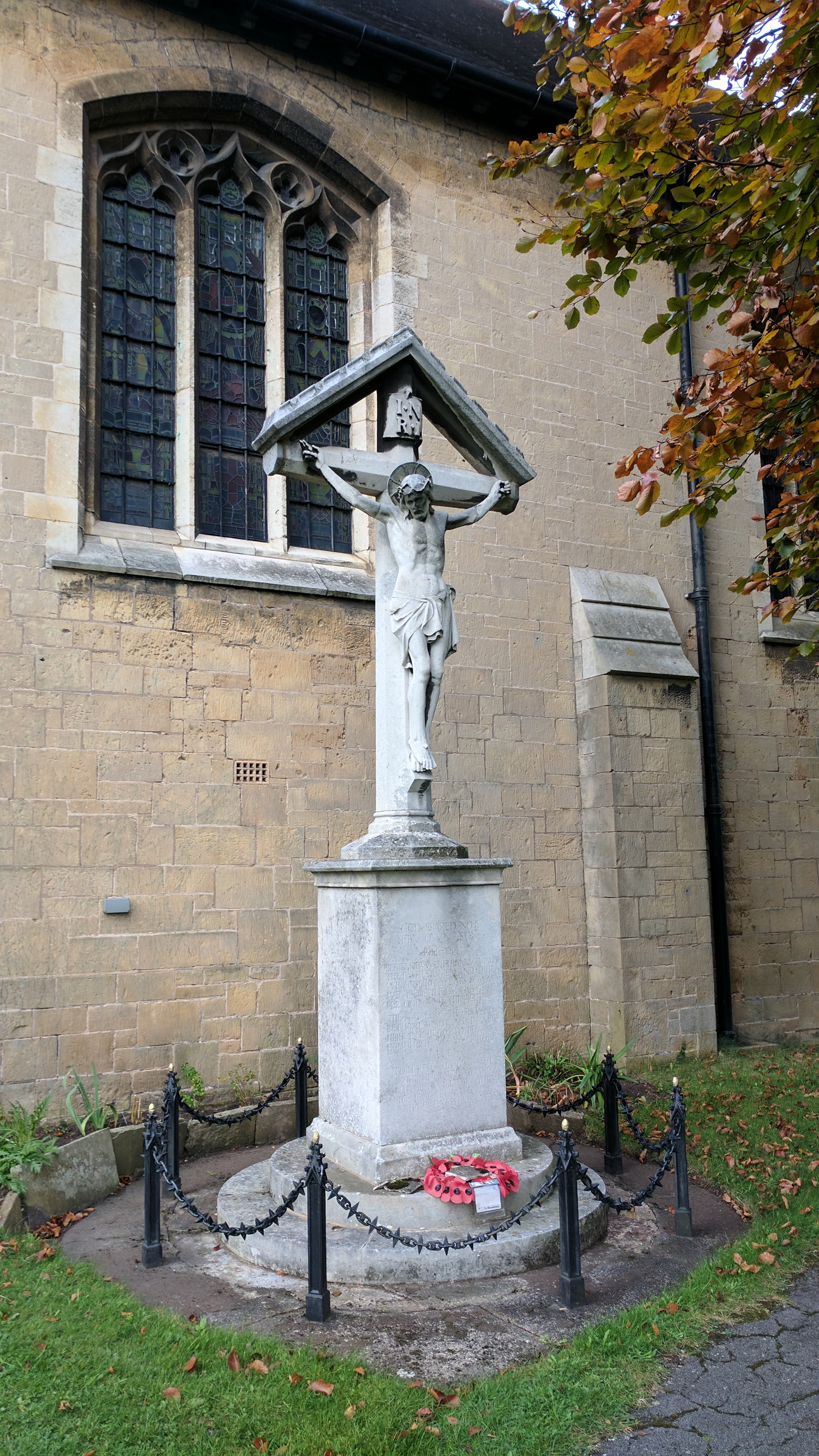
War memorial

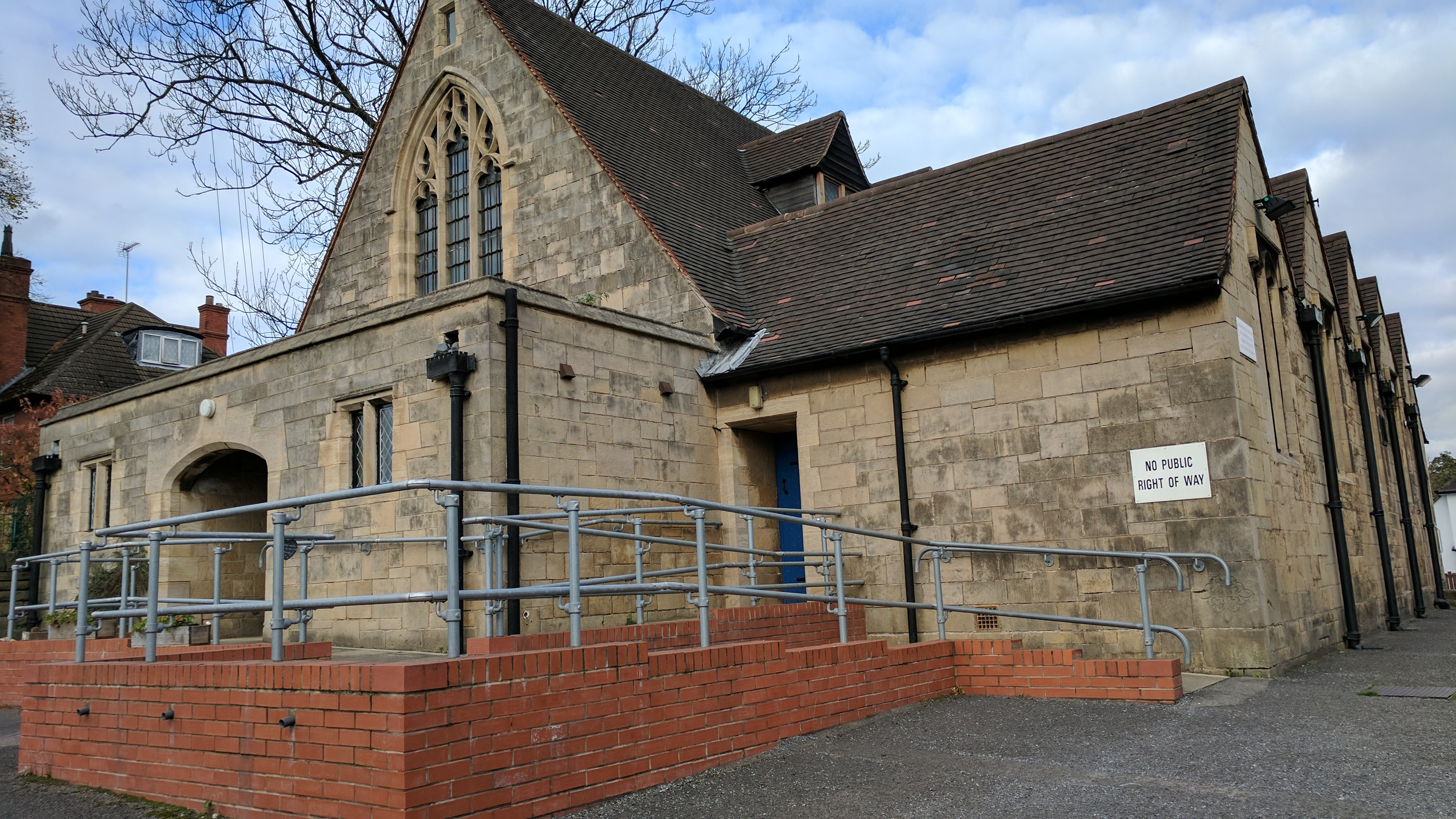
Church hall (Grade II listed)

== See also ==
- Grade II* listed buildings in Nottinghamshire
- Listed buildings in Mansfield (outer areas)
- List of new churches by Temple Moore

== Sources ==
- The Buildings of England, Nottinghamshire. Nikolaus Pevsner
