= Listed buildings in Mansfield (outer areas) =

Mansfield is a town in the Mansfield District of Nottinghamshire, England. The town and its surrounding area contain over 200 listed buildings that are recorded in the National Heritage List for England. Of these, one is listed at Grade I, the highest of the three grades, nine at Grade II*, the middle grade, and the others are at Grade II, the lowest grade. Mansfield was a royal manor in the 11th and 12th centuries, and since the Middle Ages it has been the main market centre for west Nottinghamshire. During the Industrial Revolution, mills were built long the River Maun, and the town also became a centre for stocking frame knitting, but few buildings from this period have survived.

This list contains the listed buildings in the outer areas surrounding the town, outside the ring road, the settlements including Mansfield Woodhouse, Forest Town and Pleasley Hill. Most of the listed buildings are houses, cottages and associated structures, farmhouses and farm buildings. The others include churches and items in churchyards, a market cross, road and railway bridges, railway viaducts, a commemorative stone, a dam and sluices, former mills, public houses, schools, almshouses, buildings in Mansfield Cemetery, war memorials and a telephone kiosk.

The listed buildings in the inner area are at Listed buildings in Mansfield (inner area).

== Key ==
Grade	Criteria
II*	Particularly important buildings of more than special interest
II	Buildings of national importance and special interest

== Buildings ==
Name and location	Photograph	Date	Notes	Grade
Church of St Edmund; 53.16332°N 1.19349°W		1304	The church, was substantially rebuilt between 1804 and 1810, and again between 1848 and 1853 by W. B. Moffatt, alterations were made in 1877–78 by T. C. Hine, and there have been later changes. The oldest part of the church is the steeple, and the church is built in stone with roofs of tile, lead and slate. It consists of a nave, north and south aisles, north and south porches, a chancel, a vestry, a chantry chapel, and a west steeple. The steeple has two stages, corner buttresses, a string course, and a west doorway with a double lancet window above. The bell openings have two lights with ogee heads, on the north and south sides are clock faces, and the tower is surmounted by a broach spire with two tiers of gabled lucarnes, a finial and a weathercock.	II*
Market Cross; 53.16481°N 1.19386°W		Early 14th century	The market cross is in stone, and has a square base of four steps. On this is a moulded square base, and the stump of a chamfered broached octagonal shaft.	II
The Priory; 53.16327°N 1.19724°W		15th century	A priory that has been much altered and converted into a private house, it is in stone on a chamfered plinth, with roofs of stone slate and artificial slate, and coped gables with kneelers. There are two storeys and attics, and eight bays. On the front are two doorways with moulded chamfered architraves, mullioned fanlights and hoods. Most of the windows are cross-casements with architraves, and there are also a Tudor arched lancet window, a blind quatrefoil, and an oval cartouche. To the west are single-storey outbuildings.	II*
Sampson's Lane Farmhouse and barn 53.16429°N 1.24567°W	—	Late 15th century	The farmhouse has a cruck frame, it was refronted in stone in the 18th century, and the roof is slated. There are two storeys and two bays. In the centre is a doorway with a heavy stone surround, and the windows are casements, one with a mullion. In the right gable end is a pair of exposed crucks on a brick plinth, with wattle and daub infill. Inside the farmhouse are two similar pairs of crucks. The barn is in stone with an asbestos sheet roof, and contains a stable door and a loft door.	II
57 High Street, Mansfield Woodhouse; 53.16611°N 1.19038°W	—	Late 16th or early 17th century	A former farmhouse in stone with a pantile roof. There are two storeys and five bays, and a lean-to extension. In the centre is a doorway with a heavy lintel and a hood mould, and the windows are casements with mullions and chamfered reveals. To the right is a cowshed, and at the rear there are horizontally-sliding sash windows.	II
3 Ley Lane and barn, Mansfield Woodhouse; 53.16663°N 1.18830°W		Early 17th century	A farmhouse and barn in stone with pantile roofs. The house has two storeys and attics, and an irregular L-shaped plan, with a main range of three bays and extensions. The main doorway has a chamfered surround, and the windows are casements. The barn at right angles has two storeys and two bays, and some of the openings have segmental heads.	II
15, 17 and 19 Station Street and outbuildings, Mansfield Woodhouse; 53.16421°N 1.19577°W		Early 17th century	A row of a house, a cottage and an outbuilding converted into shops, with pantile roofs and two storeys. Nos. 15 and 17 have a lower storey in stone with brick above and three bays, and in the ground floor are two shop fronts. No. 19 is in stone, and has a shop window in the lower floor and a shop front to the right. The upper floor contains a mix of horizontally-sliding sash windows and casements. The outbuilding to the right has a single story and contains a shop front.	II
The Manor House and wall 53.16340°N 1.19423°W		Early 17th century	The manor house, later converted into flats, is in stone, partly roughcast and pebbledashed, with quoins, a moulded eaves band, embattled and plain coped parapets, and coped gables. There are two and three storeys and attics, a modified H-shaped plan with additions, and a front of 15 bays. On the front is a porch with a parapet, containing a Tudor arched doorway, to the right is a projecting three-storey bay window, and in the angle to the east is a quarter-round portico with four columns and an embattled parapet. The windows are a mix of sashes, most with eared architraves and keystones, and casements. The boundary wall has flat ramped coping and extends for about 50 metres (160 ft).	II
Clerkson's Hall; 53.16526°N 1.19389°W		1631	A large house, later converted into offices, in stone on a chamfered plinth, with quoins, lintel bands, moulded eaves, and a tile roof with coped gables, kneelers, and finials. There are three storeys and an irregular cruciform plan, with fronts of eight and three bays, and a stable range to the east. Most of the windows are mullioned and transomed casements, there are two attic dormers, and two porches. Adjoining the house are two cottages with pantile roofs.	II
The Grange and wall 53.16380°N 1.19627°W		Mid 17th century	A stone farmhouse on a chamfered plinth, with quoins, and a slate roof with coped gables and kneelers. There are two storeys and attics, a double depth plan, and a front range of four bays. On the front is a porch with a hipped roof, to its right is a bay window, and further to the right is a conservatory. The windows are a mix of sashes and casements. The adjoining boundary wall has flat coping.	II
Stable block, 11 Church Street, Mansfield Woodhouse; 53.16456°N 1.19392°W	—	Late 17th century	The stable block is in stone and brick with roofs of slate and tile. It is in one and two storeys, and has an L-shaped plan, with a front range of five bays. The openings include carriage doors, and windows that are a mix of sashes and casements, some of the latter with moulded architraves. Adjoining is a fragment of a boundary wall with flat coping, containing a doorway.	II
46 Station Street, Mansfield Woodhouse; 53.16412°N 1.19708°W	—	Late 17th century	The house is in stone and has a pantile roof with stone slate verges. There are two storeys, two bays, and a lean-to on the left. The central doorway has a chamfered surround and a keystone, and the windows are casements.	II
Old Moorhaigh Farmhouse, stable and wall 53.16444°N 1.25101°W	—	Late 17th century	The farmhouse, now disused, is in stone, it is partly rendered, and has a pantile roof with coped gables and kneelers. There are two storeys and two bays, and the windows are mullioned casements. Attached to the rear is a dry stone wall and a stable.	II
Headstone south of the Lady chapel 53.16322°N 1.19327°W	—	1682	The headstone in the churchyard of the Church of St Edmund is to the memory of Arthur Caulton Senior. It consists of a stone with a shouldered arched top and an inscription.	II
Headstone and chest tomb south of the chancel 53.16315°N 1.19320°W	—	1694	The headstone in the churchyard of the Church of St Edmund is to the memory of John Eare Senior, and has a scrolled shaped top. The chest tomb is dated 1772, it is to the memory of Edward Willey, and has moulded panelled sides and top, and an inscribed panel to the south.	II
Barn, Penniment Lodge Farm; 53.15345°N 1.24060°W		1700	A barn and pigeoncote converted for residential use, it is in sandstone with a pantile roof and a single storey. On the front, large threshing doors have been replaced by windows, all the other windows are modern replacements, and in the roof are skylights. To the left is a projecting gabled wing, and at the right end is the former pigeoncote with two storeys. The upper storey is in brick, it contains perches on the front and right side, and at the rear are flight holes.	II
82 Chesterfield Road South; 53.15158°N 1.20282°W	—	Early 18th century	The house is in sandstone, partly rendered and painted, and has a slate roof with a single coped gable. There are three storeys, and an L-shaped plan, with a main block of two bays, and a two-storey rear wing. The doorway has a round-arched head and a fanlight, the windows in the main block are sashes, and in the rear wing are mullioned windows.	II
11 Church Street, Mansfield Woodhouse; 53.16424°N 1.19375°W		Early 18th century	A house, later a school, in stone, partly rendered, with a slate roof, coped gables and kneelers, and a small coped parapet. There are three storeys and a T-shaped plan, with a front range of four bays. On the front is a projecting gabled bay, a gabled timber porch, and sash windows, and at the rear is a Venetian window and a mix of sashes and casements.	II
12 Church Street and wall, Mansfield Woodhouse; 53.16433°N 1.19362°W		Early 18th century	A stone house, partly rendered, with quoins, moulded coved eaves and a stone slate roof. There are two storeys and four bays. The doorway and windows, most of which are sashes, have projecting architraves. In front of the house is a dwarf boundary wall with half-round coping, and to the right are four steps with a ramped, curved iron handrail.	II
21 High Street, Mansfield Woodhouse; 53.16565°N 1.19091°W		Early 18th century	A hotel that was divided into flats in about 1970, it is in stone on a plinth, with a sill band, projecting quoins and architraves, moulded eaves, and a tile roof with coped gables and kneelers. There are three storeys and five bays. In the centre is a Classical doorway with pilasters, a fanlight, a keystone and a pediment, and is flanked by ogee-headed footscrapers. The windows are sashes, the window above the doorway with a moulded shouldered architrave and a hood. The rear of the building is rendered and it contains modern windows and extensions.	II
33 Ratcliffe Gate; 53.14318°N 1.18960°W		Early 18th century	A house later used for other purposes, in stone with a tile roof. There are two storeys and two bays. The doorway has a fanlight, to its right is a shop window with a fascia on shaped brackets, and the other windows are three-light horizontally-sliding sashes.	II
9, 11 and 13 Station Street, Mansfield Woodhouse; 53.16433°N 1.19543°W	—	Early 18th century	A house, later shops, in stone, partly rendered and colourwashed, with a tile roof. There are two storeys and an L-shaped plan, with a front range of four bays, and a rear wing with two bays and a slate roof. On the front are doorways, three-light mullioned casement windows, and shop fronts, the right one with a modillioned hood on gabled brackets. The windows in the rear wing are sashes.	II
82 and 84 Station Street, Mansfield Woodhouse; 53.16330°N 1.19870°W		Early 18th century	The house is in stone with moulded eaves, and a tile roof with coped gables and kneelers. There are three storeys and three bays. The doorway has a chamfered surround, and a hood on large scrolled foliate brackets. Above the doorway is a slate sundial, and the windows are casements.	II
Berry Hill Hall; 53.13031°N 1.17926°W		Early 18th century	A country house, which was later extended, and subsequently converted into flats. It is in stone, with a sill band, dentilled eaves and hipped slate roofs, and most of the windows are sashes. The east front has three storeys and attics, and six bays, a single-bay addition to the right, and a two-storey service wing. At the rear is a three-storey four-bay block, and another service wing with two storeys and seven bays. Attached to the block is a pyramidal-roofed bridge, and the south front has two storeys and seven bays. The ground floor projects, and has a balustrade, and the middle bay of the upper floor projects under a pediment.	II
Ice house, Debdale Hall; 53.15914°N 1.20691°W	—	Early 18th century	The ice house is in stone with a single storey, a square plan and a single bay. On the east side are the remains of a Royal Arms in a moulded surround. The ice house is roofed with three dressed stone slabs.	II
Pavilion, Debdale Hall; 53.16015°N 1.20732°W		Early 18th century	The pavilion is in stone and is without a roof. There is a single storey, a square plan and three bays. In the east front is a central round-headed opening flanked by flat-headed openings, all with keystones. To the left of the south front is a ramped boundary wall with flat stone coping.	II
Stables, Debdale Hall; 53.16012°N 1.20771°W		Early 18th century	The stable range is in stone on a plinth, with a floor band an eaves band, and roofs of tile and slate with a coped gable. There are two storeys, and ranges of five and seven bays. The middle bay on the east front is pedimented and contains a pair of carriage doors, and elsewhere are carriage entrances with elliptical heads. Most of the windows are casements, some with segmental heads.	II
Debdale Hall; 53.16034°N 1.20707°W		c. 1730	A country house later used for other purposes, it is in stone, partly rendered, on a plinth, with moulded eaves, a parapet and a hipped slate roof. There are two storeys and a square plan, with fronts of six and seven bays. On the south front is a two-storey canted bay window with a hipped roof, and to the right is a portico with Doric columns, and a doorway with a fanlight. The east front has a projecting central bay and a pediment. Most of the windows are sashes, some horizontally-sliding, and some with aprons.	II
Wall, 11 and 12 Church Street to north, Mansfield Woodhouse; 53.16475°N 1.19374°W	—	Mid 18th century	The boundary wall is in stone with ramped flat coping. On the east side are two plain gate piers, to the north is a rounded corner containing a square pier with a flat cap, and on the west side is a blocked doorway with a chamfered surround.	II
Wall, 11 and 12 Church Street to south, Mansfield Woodhouse; 53.16409°N 1.19347°W		18th century	The boundary wall is in stone with flat stone coping. It contains a pair of square rustic gate piers with plinths and concave domed caps, and timber gates. To the right is a gateway in Classical style with pilasters, paterae, and an open pediment, and further to the right is a doorway with a plain surround, and a blocked window with an architrave. To the west is a further wall with ramped coping.	II
17 Church Street and wall, Mansfield Woodhouse; 53.16473°N 1.19410°W		Mid 18th century	The house is in stone on a plinth, with a Welsh slate roof. There are two storeys and three bays. The central doorway has a Gibbs surround, chamfered rustication and a pediment, and the windows are sashes. The boundary wall has ramped segmental coping and extends for about 50 metres (160 ft).	II
Farm buildings, 57 and 59 High Street, Mansfield Woodhouse; 53.16640°N 1.19032°W	—	Mid 18th century	A threshing barn, a hay barn and stables, they are in stone and brick with pantile roofs. There are two storeys and an L-shaped plan, with ranges of three and six bays. Most of the windows are casements, there are doorways and stable doors, and the barns contain vents.	II
35 High Street, Pleasley Hill, and wall 53.17125°N 1.24540°W		Mid 18th century	A farmhouse, later a private house, it is in stone with a tile roof. There are two storeys and attics, two bays, and a single-storey lean-to on the right with a pantile roof. On the front is a flat-roofed porch, and the windows are casements. The attached boundary wall is in stone with half-round coping, and it encloses a square garden.	II
Former Army Stores; 53.16509°N 1.19269°W		Mid 18th century	A house, later a shop, on a corner site, in stone with a pantile roof, three storeys and two bays. In the ground floor is a shop front with pilasters and curved fascia brackets, and above are sash windows, those in the middle floor with segmental heads and keystones. In the left return are mullioned casement windows, and there are two doorways with chamfered surrounds.	II
Former Chell Food Products Limited; 53.16513°N 1.19228°W		Mid 18th century	A house, later altered and used for other purposes, in stone, partly rendered, with traces of timber framing and a pantile roof. There are two storeys and attics, and an L-shaped plan with a front of three bays, and a rear wing. On the front are a doorway with a chamfered surround, a shop window with a moulded hood, a stair window and sash windows.	II
Church Lane Bridge; 53.18064°N 1.21307°W		Mid 18th century	The bridge carries a road over the River Meden. It is in stone and consists of a single semicircular arch. The bridge has a keystone, a parapet with half-round coping and an iron handrail. On the east side is a curved ramped extension about 10 metres (33 ft) long.	II
Cross Hill Cottage; 53.16461°N 1.19409°W		Mid 18th century	The house is in stone, partly rendered, with a pantile roof. There are two storeys, a main front of three bays, and a two-storey extension to the east. Most of the windows are sashes, and to the southwest is a two-storey single-bay outbuilding.	II
Field Mill House; 53.13735°N 1.19832°W		Mid 18th century	A house, later used for other purposes, in stone, partly roughcast, with coped parapets and slate roofs. There are two and three storeys and four bays, and a later two-storey extension to the left. The windows are sashes, and there is a porch with a hipped roof.	II
Moorhaigh Farmhouse and wall 53.16428°N 1.25110°W	—	Mid 18th century	The farmhouse is roughcast with stone dressings and a pantile roof. There are two storeys, and a main range with three bays, a single bay addition to the left, beyond that a recessed bay, and a rear wing. In the centre is a gabled porch, and the windows are top-hung casements. The adjoining garden wall is in stone with chamfered coping, and it contains two round-topped stone gate piers.	II
Pleasley Hill Farmhouse, garden wall and gate piers 53.17019°N 1.24636°W		Mid 18th century	The farmhouse, which has been extended, is in stone, with roofs of tile and slate. The front range has a plinth, an eaves band, and coped gables. There are two storeys and three bays. In the centre is a square porch with a cornice, and a round-arched doorway with a moulded surround flanked by Doric columns, and a door with a fanlight, and the windows on the front are sashes. There are two rear wings, the older one with mullioned windows, and the later one with casements. Attached to the left is an S-shaped garden stone wall with half-round coping, and a gateway with square gate piers.	II
Coach house southeast of Pleasley Hill Farmhouse; 53.17012°N 1.24612°W	—	Mid 18th century	The coach house is in stone with a hipped pantile roof, two storeys and three bays. On the front is a central round-arched carriage entrance flanked by stable doors, and above is a three-light casement window flanked by two-light mullioned windows. At the rear is a loft door.	II
Rose Cottage and outbuilding 53.16625°N 1.19251°W		Mid 18th century	The house and outbuilding are in stone with pantile roofs. There are two storeys and an L-shaped plan, with a main range of three bays. On the front is a rustic porch, and the windows are casements. On the east gable end is a blocked three-light window with moulded mullions and a hood mould.	II
Sarcophagus; 53.16313°N 1.19355°W		Mid 18th century	The sarcophagus is in the churchyard of the Church of St Edmund. It is in stone, on a rectangular base of four steps, and has rebated corners, a moulded top edge, and a hipped lid. On the west side is a wreathed cartouche with a coat of arms, and on the other sides are panels with barely legible inscriptions.	II
Boundary walls, The Manor House; 53.16270°N 1.19459°W	—	18th century	The walls are in stone with flat, gabled and moulded copings. The wall on Castle Street has two blocked doorways and three quatrefoil openings, and it extends for about 60 metres (200 ft). On Priory Road, the wall is about 88 metres (289 ft) long, and curves to a central gateway flanked by gate piers with moulded caps and ball finials.	II
Warren Farmhouse; 53.16437°N 1.15695°W		Mid 18th century	The farmhouse is in stone with floor bands, rebated eaves and a pantile roof. There are three storeys, and an L-shaped plan, with a main range of three bays, a rear wing, and an extension to the right. In the centre is a doorway with a fanlight, and a hood on reeded curved brackets, flanked by French windows. Most of the windows are casements, some with mullions.	II
Forest Stone; 53.11634°N 1.16722°W		1752	A commemorative square stone over 2 metres (6 ft 7 in) high on a stone platform, marking the site of an ancient meeting place. The corners are chamfered, and on the west face is a 20th-century inscribed plaque.	II
Cartshed, Berry Hill Hall; 53.13055°N 1.18117°W	—	c. 1770	The cartshed, with a loft above, is in stone with a hipped tile roof. There are two storeys and six bays. In the ground floor are six cart openings and above are six windows, all with segmental-arched heads. At the left end is an external double stairway leading to a doorway.	II
Coach house and piers, Berry Hill Hall; 53.13074°N 1.17956°W		c. 1770	The coach house is in stone on a plinth, with quoins, a floor band, an eaves band, and a hipped slate roof. There are two storeys and three bays. The north wall is arcaded, and in the centre of the south front is a projecting three-stage square tower with a mounting block at the base. It is surmounted by a two-stage octagonal cupola with clock faces, above which are bell openings, and a lead ogee cap. In the ground floor are a doorway, windows, and a segmental-headed carriage entrance. To the east is a pair of rusticated stone gate piers.	II
27, 29 and 31 Station Street, Mansfield Woodhouse; 53.16394°N 1.19659°W		Late 18th century	A pair of cottages and a malt house in stone with a slate roof. There are two storeys, the cottages have two bays each, and the malt house has four. On the front are doorways with plain surrounds, sash windows, a carriage entrance with a segmental head, and garage doors.	II
Dam and sluices, Pleasley; 53.17271°N 1.24538°W		Late 18th century	The dam and sluice associated with Pleasley Mill are southwest of Pleasley Bridge. The dam is in stone, with a wall about 3 metres (9.8 ft) thick and 20 metres (66 ft) long. It has a central cutwater flanked by single elliptical-arched sluices, that are closed on the water side by vertical wooden sluice gates and operating gear. On the sides are flanking walls, and to the east is a stepped spillway.	II
Matlock Mill Joinery Works; 53.13384°N 1.20986°W		Late 18th century	A water-powered textile mill later converted for other uses, it is in stone, on a plinth, with additions in brick, quoins and a slate roof. There are two storeys and eleven bays. The windows are a mix of csashes and casements, those in the upper floor with stone lintels, and there is a blocked round wheel arch.	II
Stanton's Mill and outbuildings 53.14819°N 1.18646°W		Late 18th century	A water-powered textile mill that was later extended, and subsequently converted into workshops. It is in stone with tile and slate roofs, the original block with three storeys and eight bays, and two wheel openings in the basement. To the north is a later block with three storeys basement and attics, and 13 bays, and further to the north is a block with two storeys and a basement, three bays, and a flat roof. Elsewhere, there is a former office block with a hipped roof, three storeys and three bays, and a single-storey stable with a hipped roof.	II
Pleasley Bridge; 53.17292°N 1.24525°W		c. 1800	The bridge carries Chesterfield Road over the River Meden, and is in stone. On the south side are two round arches with keystones and a smaller round arch to the east. There is an impost band, and a coped parapet wall. The north side has two plain round arches and a smaller arch, a parapet wall with slab coping, and end piers with concave-sided square domed caps.	II
Carr Bank; 53.14956°N 1.19003°W		1803–05	A country house later converted into a hotel, it is in stone with moulded cornices and hipped slate roofs. There are two storeys and a south front of three bays. In the centre of the front is a semicircular bay window with clustered columns and a cornice, above which is a canted slate-hung bay window with a cornice. The outer bays contain two-storey canted bay windows, each with a floor band and a moulded cornice. The windows are sashes, and at the rear is a large extension.	II
North Lodge Farmhouse; 53.17343°N 1.20906°W		1816	The farmhouse is in stone, with quoins, moulded eaves and a tile roof. There are three storeys and an L-shaped plan, with a main range of three bays. In the centre is a latticed scrollwork porch with a slate roof, above it is an initialled datestone, and the windows are sashes with projecting architraves.	II
King's Mill Viaduct; 53.13295°N 1.22458°W		1819 (possible)	The viaduct was built for the Mansfield and Pinxton Railway, a horse-drawn railway, and it was later converted to carry trains drawn by locomotives. It is in stone, and consists of five round arches, between which are pilaster buttresses. There is an impost band, the central arch has a dated keystone, and the parapet has flat coping.	II
5–11 Terrace Road and walls 53.14796°N 1.19343°W		c. 1820	A terrace of four stone houses on a plinth with a slate roof. There are three storeys and twelve bays. The windows are a mix of casements and sashes. The doorways on the front are round-headed with imposts, fanlights, and keystones. On the right return is a flat-roofed porch with a similar doorway, over which is an ornate openwork cast iron canopy. The low stone boundary wall has gabled coping, a rounded corner on the left, and the right end is truncated.	II
Mill Bank Cottage and wall 53.15368°N 1.20312°W		c. 1820	The former mill house is in stone, rendered at the rear, and has pantile roofs. There are two storeys and three bays. In the centre is a round-arched doorway with a blank fanlight, imposts and a keystone. The windows are sashes, and the openings on the front have projecting surrounds. To the left is a higher two-storey outbuilding with a lean-to. The boundary wall has half-round coping, it contains two blocked gates with round-topped gate piers, and extends for about 50 metres (160 ft).	II
Penniment Lodge Farm; 53.15345°N 1.24012°W		c. 1820	The farmhouse is in rendered stone with stone dressings and a slate roof. There are two storeys and three bays. In the centre is a round-arched doorway with a fanlight and a keystone, and the windows are sashes. At the rear is a single-storey outbuilding with a pyramidal roof, and attached to the right is a brick wall containing six segmental arches.	II
Bath Mill; 53.14971°N 1.18193°W		1822–31	A former water-powered textile mill, now disused and derelict, in stone with slate roofs. The surviving part has two storeys and four bays, and the windows are unglazed. At the northwest corner is an external tall square chimney stack.	II
20, 22 and 24 Albert Street, Mansfield Woodhouse; 53.16708°N 1.18893°W		Early 19th century	A pair of cottages and an adjoining house in stone with a slate roof. There are two storeys and attics, and four bays, and at the rear of the cottages are lean-tos with pantile roofs. The house to the right has a doorway with pilasters, and a cornice with a crest and acroteria, and the windows throughout are casements.	II
28–38 Albert Street, Mansfield Woodhouse; 53.16734°N 1.18809°W		Early 19th century	A row of six stone cottages with a slate roof. There are two storeys and attics, a front of six bays, and two bays deep. Each cottage has a doorway, most of the windows are casements, and there are horizontally-sliding sash windows.	II
40 and 42 Albert Street, Mansfield Woodhouse; 53.16748°N 1.18803°W		Early 19th century	Two cottages in stone with roofs of pantile and slate. There are two storeys, two bays, an extension in roughcast brick on the right, and further to the right is a lean-to porch. The windows are casements, and there is a flat-roofed dormer.	II
48 and 50 Albert Street, Mansfield Woodhouse; 53.16743°N 1.18864°W		Early 19th century	A pair of stone cottages with a pantile roof. There are two storeys and attics, two bays, and a single-storey lean-to outbuilding at each end. The cottages have a porch, a doorway and casement windows.	II
58 and 62 Albert Street and wall, Mansfield Woodhouse; 53.16735°N 1.18914°W		Early 19th century	A row of three stone cottages with a slate roof. There are two storeys and attics, and three bays. The doorways have architraves, the two right doors have pedimented lintels, and the windows are sashes. The boundary walls have shaped coping and extend for about 25 metres (82 ft).	II
64–80 Albert Street, Mansfield Woodhouse; 53.16763°N 1.18940°W		Early 19th century	A group of stone cottages with roofs of pantile and slate, and two storeys. They form an L-shaped plan with four bays facing the street, and eight bays forming a rear wing on the right. On the street front is a carriage entry with an elliptical arch and a keystone. The doorways on this front have round-arched heads, fanlights and keystones, those on the rear wing have plain architraves, and the windows are casements.	II
82 to 92 Albert Street and wall, Mansfield Woodhouse; 53.16786°N 1.18955°W		Early 19th century	A row of six stone cottages with a slate roof, two streys and twelve bays. The doorway has architraves, and the windows are casements. The boundary walls have gabled coping and extend for about 50 metres (160 ft).	II
16 High Street, Mansfield Woodhouse; 53.16509°N 1.19280°W		Early 19th century	A stone house in a terrace with a tile roof. There are two storeys and a cellar, and a single bay. To the left is a cellar opening, above which are two sash windows, and to the right are two doorways with projecting architraves.	II
26 High Street, Mansfield Woodhouse; 53.16511°N 1.19256°W	—	Early 19th century	A shop in stone, partly rendered that has a gabled M-shaped pantile roof with a stone slate verge, There are two storeys, a double-depth plan and a single bay. On the front is a 19th-century shop front with a moulded hood, above which is a sash window. At the rear is a doorway and a casement window, and a single-storey outbuilding with a slate roof and horizontally-sliding sash windows.	II
51, 53 and 55 High Street, Mansfield Woodhouse; 53.16592°N 1.19045°W	—	Early 19th century	A row of three cottages in stone and brick with pantile roofs, and a lean-to extension to the south. There are two storeys and seven bays. On the front are doorways and a porch, and the windows are a mix of casements and sashes, some of the latter horizontally-sliding.	II
59 High Street, Mansfield Woodhouse; 53.16604°N 1.19004°W		Early 19th century	A stone house with moulded eaves, and a tile roof with one coped gable. There are three storeys and three bays, and the windows on the front are sashes. On the front is a porch on a plinth, with a parapet, and to the right is a French window. At the rear are two two-storey extensions.	II
Former Allens Chemist; 53.16509°N 1.19303°W		Early 19th century	A shop with a flat above, in stone, pebbledashed and rendered, with a Welsh slate roof. There are three storeys, three bays, and later rear extensions. In the ground floor is a shop front and a recessed doorway on the right, and the upper floors contain sash windows with moulded architraves.	II
Grotto, Carr Bank Park; 53.15008°N 1.18931°W		Early 19th century (probable)	The garden grotto is in limestone, reinforced with concrete, and partly covered with earth. It consists of a curving tunnel, with a triangular-headed entrance to the west, smaller openings in the north and south sides, and a concrete segmental arch at the east.	II
Former Leeds Permanent Building Society office 53.16410°N 1.19608°W		Early 19th century	Framework knitters' cottages, later offices, in stone with a pantile roof. There are two storeys, an L-shaped plan, and a front range of four bays. The ground floor contains a central doorway flanked by windows. In the upper floor, to the left are three large original horizontally-sliding sash windows, and a smaller sash window to the right. At the rear is a single-bay cottage and an attached single-bay outbuilding.	II
Pleasley Hill House; 53.17083°N 1.24510°W		Early 19th century	A farmhouse, later a private house, it is stuccoed, with stone dressings and a slate roof. There are two storeys and three bays. In the centre is a round-headed doorway in a coved recess, with a fanlight, and the windows are sashes. On the right return is a flat-roofed square porch with a blind round-arched recess, and at the rear is a stair window.	II
The Angel Inn; 53.16523°N 1.19184°W		Early 19th century	The public house is in stone on a plinth, and has a hipped tile roof. There are two storeys, an L-shaped plan with fronts of five bays. The doorway has a plain surround, and most of the windows are sashes.	II
The former Old Inn; 53.16370°N 1.19763°W		Early 19th century	The former public house is in stone with a tile roof. There are three storeys and an L-shaped plan with fronts of three and four bays. The windows are a mix of plain and horizontally-sliding sashes and casements, all with rendered splayed lintels.	II
Former Mansfield District Council Offices; 53.16404°N 1.19628°W		1839	A Methodist church to which a Sunday school was added to the right in 1845, and later converted for other uses, it is in stone with rusticated lintels, an eaves band, and a slate roof. There are two storeys, the original three bays are under a gable, and the addition has a single gabled bay. The doorway has Tuscan columns, a fanlight and a plain hood, and the windows are sashes. The boundary wall has saddleback coping, and extends for about 20 metres (66 ft).	II
St. Edmund's School, house and wall 53.16421°N 1.19020°W		1844–45	The former school, which was extended in 1883, and the house, are in stone on a plinth with chamfered eaves, and a slate roof with coped gables and kneelers. The school has one and two storeys, and five unequal bays. The windows are a mix of casements and lancets, most with hood moulds, and some of the doorways have Tudor arched heads and hood moulds. The right bay is gabled and has a corbelled gabled bell turret with a dated base. The teacher's house is to the north, and the boundary wall is in stone with gabled coping, it is about 60 metres (200 ft) long, and contains two square chamfered gate piers.	II
6 and 8 Albert Street, Mansfield Woodhouse; 53.16650°N 1.18860°W		Mid 19th century	A pair of cottages with the gable end facing the street, in stone with a tile roof, two storeys and three bays. On the gable end is a shop window and a doorway, and the other windows are a mix of casements and sashes, some of the latter horizontally-sliding. On the main front is a doorway with Gothick tracery.	II
44 and 46 Albert Street, Mansfield Woodhouse; 53.16758°N 1.18814°W		Mid 19th century	A pair of cottages with a slate roof, two storeys and two bays. No. 46 has a slated lean-to porch, on No. 44 is a gabled timber porch, and the windows are casements.	II
52, 54 and 56 Albert Street and wall, Mansfield Woodhouse; 53.16726°N 1.18906°W		Mid 19th century	A row of three stone cottages with a slate roof. There are two storeys and attics, and three bays. The doorways have pedimented lintels, and the windows are casements. The boundary wall has shaped coping and extends for about 25 metres (82 ft).	II
Stable, 49 High Street, Mansfield Woodhouse; 53.16624°N 1.19057°W	—	Mid 19th century	The stable is in stone with a pantile roof. There is a single storey, three bays, and an extension to the south. The stable contains doorways, a stable door, garage doors, and casement windows.	II
Wall and gate, 2 Station Street, Mansfield Woodhouse; 53.16494°N 1.19438°W	—	19th century	The wall is in stone with gabled and half-round coping, and it extends for about 150 metres (490 ft). On the south side is a pair of square panelled gate piers with pyramidal caps, to the right is a wicket gate, and there is a round-headed opening with a moulded surround, a hood mould, and a stepped coped gable.	II
22 and 24 Station Street, Mansfield Woodhouse; 53.16446°N 1.19552°W	—	Mid 19th century	A house and a shop in stone with a tile roof. There are two storeys, and an L-shaped plan, with a front range of four bays, and rear wings. At the left is a carriage entrance with a timber lintel, to its right is a shop window, and further to the right is a round-arched doorway with imposts and a fanlight. The other windows are sashes, and in an angle at the rear is a porch.	II
Walls and gate piers, 80 Woodhouse Road and 2 Haddon Road; 53.15157°N 1.19413°W	—	Mid 19th century	The boundary wall enclosing the gardens of the two houses is in stone with half-round and stepped copings, and it extends for about 100 metres (330 ft). The wall contains two pairs of square gate piers with rebated corners.	II
Cartshed, Debdale Hall; 53.16061°N 1.20815°W		Mid 19th century	The cartshed is in stone and has a tile roof. There is a single storey and five bays. On the east front are four cart openings with rounded piers. The south gable has a screen wall with flat stone coping, and to the left is a lean-to.	II
Heath's Almshouses and wall 53.1414°N 1.19551°W		1855	The almshouses are in stone on a plinth, and have tile roofs with coped gables. There is a single storey, and they consist of two blocks of six single-bay houses linked by an archway. The porches are gabled and paired, and each contains a doorway with a Tudor arch, and the windows are two-light casements with mullions. The archway contains a doorway with a segmental arch, over which is an inscribed and dated scroll, and a stepped gable with a string course and a shield. The boundary wall is in stone with moulded coping, and it contains a pair of central square gate piers with gabled caps.	II
Chapel, Mansfield Cemetery; 53.12490°N 1.19244°W		1857	The cemetery chapel is in Gothic Revival style, and is in stone with slate roofs. It consists of a central arched entrance flanked by chapels with porches. The archway has a segmental-pointed head, a moulded surround and a hood mould, and above it are two lancet windows. The stage over this is blind and has stepped diagonal buttresses with crocketed pinnacles. The bell stage is octagonal, and contains lancet openings containing tracery and gables with finials, and the tower is surmounted by a spire with a cross and a finial. The windows and doorways in the chapels have pointed arches.	II
Gateway, Mansfield Cemetery; 53.12713°N 1.19202°W		1857	The gateway is in stone and in Gothic Revival style. It consists of a segmental-pointed arch with a hood mould, over which is a gable with moulded coping, a finial and a Celtic cross, and containing a lancet window.	II
Tomb, Mansfield Cemetery; 53.12599°N 1.19193°W	—	c. 1857	The tomb is in stone, on a plinth, with a stone slab roof. It has a frieze, a moulded cornice, a pediment at each end, and Doric corner pilasters. At the west end is a blocked doorway flanked by Doric pilasters.	II
46 Nottingham Road; 53.14089°N 1.19576°W		1858	A house, later an office, in stone with tile roofs, coped gables, kneelers and finials, and in Gothic Revival style. There are two storeys and attics, and four bays. Most of the windows are lancets, some with ogee heads, there are two two-storey bay windows, and in an angle is a gabled porch containing a doorway with a pointed arch, a moulded surround, and a hood mould.	II
Mausoleum, Mansfield Cemetery; 53.12562°N 1.19202°W		1858	The mausoleum to the Walker family is in stone, on a plinth, with an impost band, a blocking course, acroteria at the corners, a flat roof, and a square plan. On the west front is a doorway with a moulded surround, a cornice, and a frieze with an inscription, above which is a pediment. At the rear is an opening in the form of a cross.	II
Wildman Memorial, Mansfield Cemetery; 53.12542°N 1.19201°W		1859	The memorial to members of the Wildman family is in stone, with a hipped stone slab roof and a cross finial, and it is in Gothic style. The memorial has a rectangular base, a moulded plinth, and a chamfered top, with an inscription on the sides. There is a large canopy on arcades of pink granite columns with cusped arches. At each corner is an octagonal shaft, and under the canopy are inscribed brass tablets.	II
80 Woodhouse Road and 2 Haddon Road; 53.15172°N 1.19443°W	—	c. 1860	A pair of houses on a corner site in yellow brick on a plinth, with red brick dressings, and slate roofs with coped gables. There are two storeys and seven bays. Most of the windows are round-arched sashes with polychrome heads in moulded brick, some also with enriched keystones. There are also square bay windows, a round window, and a hooded dormer. On the front is a square porch containing a round-arched doorway flanked by pilasters with stiff-leaf capitals, and a door with a fanlight.	II
Monument, Mansfield Cemetery; 53.12658°N 1.19257°W		1869	The monument is to the memory of Jabez Fish, it is in cast iron, and in Classical style. It consists of a square pedestal on a square base, with a framed inscribed panel on each face, round corner shafts, and a moulded plinth and cornice. On the top is a stepped cap surmounted by an urn.	II
Drury Dam Viaduct; 53.13563°N 1.20553°W		c. 1875	The viaduct, now disused, was built by the Midland Railway to carry its Southwell to Mansfield line over the River Maun. It consists of ten round arches in stone with red brick dressings, and a single cast iron skew arch over Quarry Lane. The cast iron section has a round arch with pierced spandrels and a panelled cast iron parapet, and is flanked by pilaster buttresses.	II
Railway bridge west of Hermitage Mill; 53.13341°N 1.22085°W		c. 1875	The railway bridge consists of a single skewed span with wrought iron beams, and a balustrade of pierced cast iron with a moulded handrail. The abutments are in stone with an impost band, and the end piers have moulded stone caps.	II
Former cattle market and gates 53.14006°N 1.19559°W		1877	The lodge to the former cattle market designed by Watson Fothergill and later used for other purposes, is in red brick on a stone plinth, with dressings in blue brick and stone, moulded brick eaves, and tile roofs with decorative ridge tiles. There are two storeys and four bays, and on the corner is a round tower with machicolated eaves, and a conical roof with a wind vane. Most of the windows are mullioned, there is an oriel window on corbels with a hipped roof, and a drinking fountain. Attached is a pair of chamfered square stone gate piers with chamfered octagonal tops, and between are ornate wrought iron gates.	II
Stoneleigh; 53.14990°N 1.19695°W		1877	The house is in stone on a blue brick plinth, with string courses, an eaves band, and hipped slate roofs. On the entrance front is a round tower containing round-arched lancet windows with polychromic heads, surmounted by a wooden turret with a pyramidal roof and a weathervane. To the left is a round-arched doorway approached by steps, with shafts, and a hood mould with a dated panel. On the garden front is a two-storey canted bay window, and to its right is a tent-roofed verandah on cast iron posts. Most of the windows are sashes with segmental heads.	II
Church of St Chad; 53.18026°N 1.21304°W		1881	The church is in brick with stone dressings and a slate roof, and consists of a nave, a north porch, north and south transepts and a chancel. At the west end is a bell turret, and in the roof are three trefoiled gabled dormers. The bell turret is octagonal, and has a patterned leaded base, pointed bell openings, and a conical lead and slate roof with a weathercock. The porch has buttresses, a doorway with a pointed arch and a hood mould, and inside are wooden benches.	II
Queen Elizabeth's Girls' School; 53.15002°N 1.19509°W		1891	The school, later converted into flats, is in stone, on a plinth, with sill bands and tile roofs. The main block has two storeys, six bays, and two gables. Most of the windows have elliptical heads, and on the main front is a canted oriel window with a hipped roof. The entrance block has a single storey, a chamfered coped parapet and a ramped flat-topped gable. It contains a doorway with a moulded surround and a Tudor arch. To the right is the former head's house, with two storeys and attics, and four bays.	II
Boundary wall and gate piers, Queen Elizabeth's Girls' School; 53.15034°N 1.19465°W		1891	Flanking the entrance to the grounds is a pair of round stone gate piers with chamfered bases, and moulded tops with small domed caps. The boundary wall has half-round coping and rounded corners, and it extends for about 350 metres (1,150 ft).	II
St Mark's Church; 53.13849°N 1.19765°W		1896–97	The church, designed by Temple Moore in Perpendicular style, is in stone with a tile roof. It consists of a nave and a chancel under a continuous roof, a west narthex with flanking porches, an east vestry and sacristy a north Lady chapel, and a southeast tower. The tower is small and tapering, with two stages, a plinth, string courses and an embattled parapet. The boundary wall is in stone with ramped half-round coping, containing a pair of square gate piers with square domed caps.	II*
Innisdoon, wall and gate piers 53.14901°N 1.19979°W		1904–05	A house designed by Barry Parker and Raymond Unwin in Arts and Crafts style, it has painted roughcast walls and tile roofs. There are two storeys, an irregular triangular plan, and a front of three bays. The north front has a jettied gable with a six-light window, and a recessed splayed entrance. In the garden front is a continuous upper floor window with 16 lights, under which is a full-length canopy with a hipped roof. To the southeast is a two-storey service wing, and to the south is a boundary wall with half-round coping containing a pair of vermiculated square stone gate piers.	II*
Church Hall, St Mark's Church; 53.13865°N 1.19804°W		c. 1907	The hall, designed by Temple Moore, is in stone with a tile roof, two storeys and five bays. At the west end is a gable containing a three-light traceried window with a pointed arch. Under it is a projecting porch with a flat roof and a coped parapet, containing a doorway with an elliptical arch, flanked by two-light mullioned windows. On the south side are five gables, and above are four gabled dormers.	II
Kingsway Hall; 53.15364°N 1.15915°W		1908–09	Originally a Miners' Welfare Hall, it is in Jacobean Revival style. The building is in red and blue striped brick, partly rendered, with stone dressings, a sill band, and a double-pitched Westmorland slate roof with coped gables and kneelers. It is in one and two storeys, and has a T-shaped plan, with a front range of three bays, and a depth of eight bays. On the south front, the middle bay projects, it is gabled, and flanked by rusticated pilasters. In the centre is a round-arched doorway with a moulded architrave and a hood, above which is a large round-headed mullioned casement window with a hood on scrolled brackets and a keystone, and over that is an inscribed plaque. Elsewhere, the windows are casements, on the returns of the front bay are two-storey canted bay windows, and along the sides the windows have a continuous hood mould and are separated by buttresses.	II
St Lawrence's Church; 53.14396°N 1.17922°W		1909	The church is built in stone with tile roofs, and consists of a nave, a west porch, north and south transepts, a chancel and a southwest tower. The tower has three stages, a chamfered northeast corner, an impost band, and a parapet with stepped moulded coping. In the bottom stage is a doorway with a pointed arch and a hood mould, above which is a lancet window with a hood mould, the bell openings have two lights, and on the parapet is a recessed panel with a cross.	II
Gateway, St Lawrence's Church; 53.14396°N 1.17985°W		1909	The gateway at the entrance to the churchyard is in stone, and approached by two semicircular steps. These are flanked by wide, splayed piers with stepped moulded coping. Between the piers is a wrought iron overthrow with a square lantern.	II
Nottingham Road Methodist Church; 53.14077°N 1.19505°W		1913	The church is in stone and yellow brick with Westmorland slate roofs. It consists of a nave with double north and south transepts, at the east end is an apse, vestries and meeting rooms, and at the southwest is a steeple. The steeple has a tower with three stages, gabled diagonal buttresses with square pinnacles, a string course, and a coped parapet. In the bottom stage is a doorway with a segmental-pointed arch, a traceried fanlight, an impost band, and a hood mould, above it are lancet windows, in the top stage is a recess with a segmental head containing bell openings, and the tower is surmounted by an octagonal spire with a ball finial.	II
Wall and gates, Nottingham Road Methodist Church; 53.14078°N 1.19537°W		1913	The boundary wall is in stone with chamfered coping, and it contains piers with chamfered caps. Opposite the west door are square gate piers containing ogee-headed recessed panels with flat heads, and at the corner to the right are similar piers, both pairs with wrought iron gates.	II
Hardstaff Homes (east); 53.16286°N 1.19514°W		1914	A row of four retirement homes in red brick, with stone dressings and Westmorland slate roofs. There are two storeys, four bays, and a C-shaped plan, the outer bays projecting with coped gables and kneelers, and there are smaller gables on the inner bays. The doorways have moulded architraves, elliptical heads and hood moulds, and the windows are casements with moulded mullions and reveals, and hood moulds. At the rear are four gabled single-storey outbuildings.	II
Hardstaff Homes (west); 53.16283°N 1.19557°W		1914	A row of four retirement homes in red brick, with stone dressings and Westmorland slate roofs. There are two storeys, four bays, and a C-shaped plan, the outer bays projecting with coped gables and kneelers, and there are smaller gables on the inner bays. The doorways have moulded architraves, elliptical heads and hood moulds, and the windows are casements with moulded mullions and reveals, and hood moulds. At the rear are four gabled single-storey outbuildings.	II
Boundary wall, Hardstaff Homes; 53.16262°N 1.19561°W		1914	The front wall is in brick with ramped moulded coping, and is about 50 metres (160 ft) long. It contains six square piers with moulded square caps, and at the entrance are larger piers with ball finials. On the east side is a stone wall extending for about 150 metres (490 ft), on a plinth with half-round coping, containing four piers with pyramidal caps.	II
	c. 1920	The war memorial is on a semicircular platform, with steps in the middle. In the centre is a rectangular pedestal with a cornice, a segmental pediment and a blocking course. This contains a bronze wreath over an inscribed bronze tablet, flanked by ramped fluted buttresses. Outside it are short ramped walls and piers with stepped square caps. These are flanked by curving walls with moulded coping, ending in piers with moulded caps.	II	
War memorial, Mansfield Cemetery; 53.12696°N 1.19218°W		c. 1920	The war memorial, which was designed by Reginald Blomfield, is in Portland stone. It consists of a tapered octagonal cross with a bronze sword on the front face, standing on an octagonal pedestal with an inscribed plinth, with a two-stepped octagonal base, the upper step with a chamfered cornice.	II
War memorial and railings, St Mark's Church; 53.13842°N 1.19758°W		c. 1920	The war memorial in the churchyard is in Portland stone. It consists of a gabled crucifix on an inscribed square pedestal with a moulded plinth and cornice, standing on a base of two circular steps. Enclosing the memorial is a railing containing short cast iron posts with crocketed finials, linked by a spiked chain.	II
Telephone kiosk 53.16520°N 1.19353°W		1935	The K6 type telephone kiosk in High Street was designed by Giles Gilbert Scott. Constructed in cast iron with a square plan and a dome, it has three unperforated crowns in the top panels.	II
Intake Farm School; 53.14428°N 1.22177°W		1956–57	The school is built in a system to counteract mining subsistence, using a pin-pointed and spring-loaded steel frame. This is clad in pre-cast concrete panels, decorative tile-hung panels, and timber boarding. The hall has a low pitched roof and the front is fully glazed, and the classrooms have flat roofs, an L-shaped plan, and strip windows.	II
