= Church of St Chad, Pleasley Vale =

Coordinates: 53.1803°N 1.2131°W

St Chad's
- Pleasley Vale: St Chad
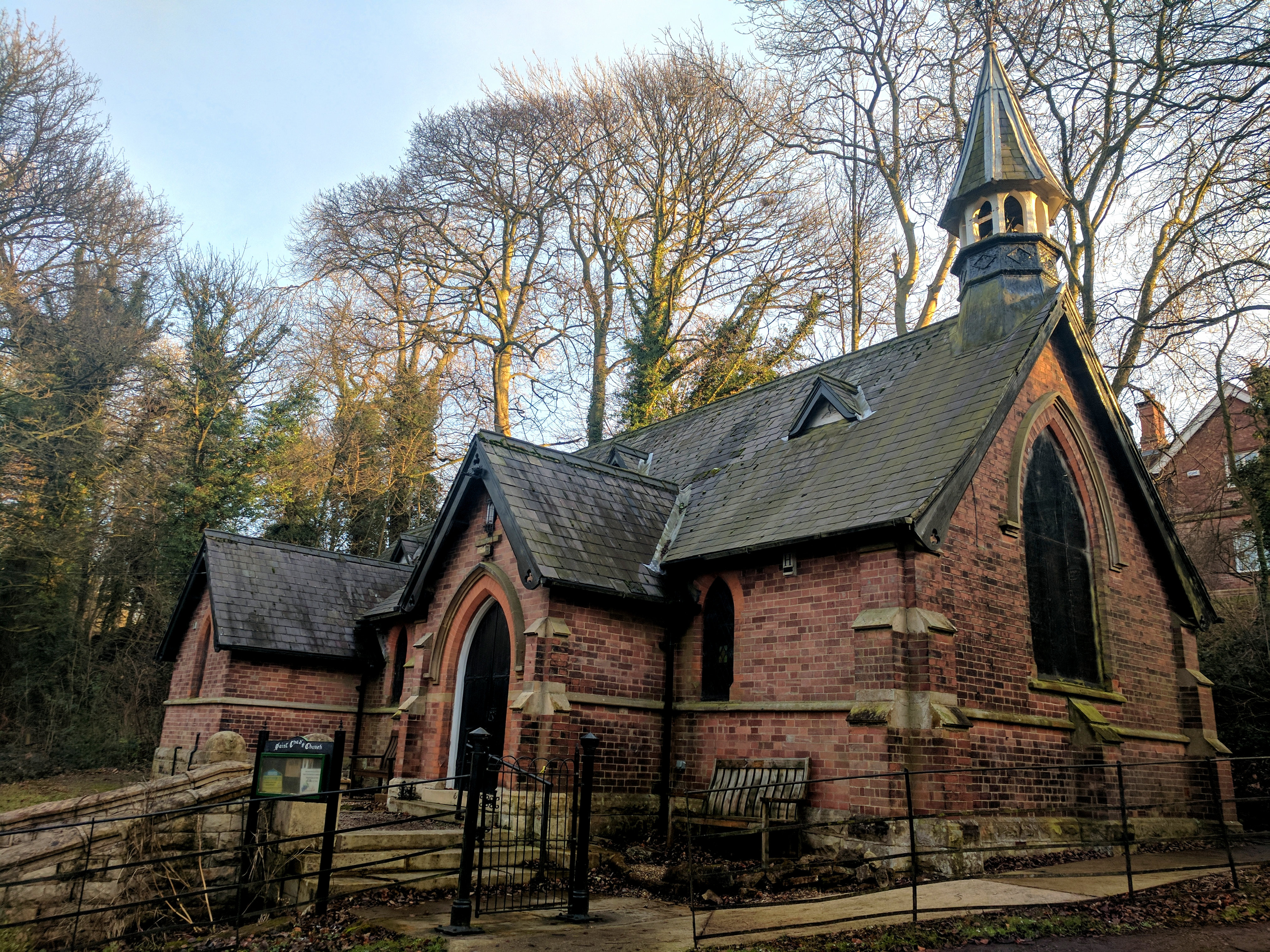
- St Chad's, viewed from Church Lane, Pleasley Vale

- Location in Nottinghamshire
- OS grid reference: SK 52697 65081
- Location: Church Lane, Pleasley Vale, Nottinghamshire
- Country: England
- Denomination: Church of England
- Churchmanship: Central
- Website: St. Ed's with St. Chad's

History
- Status: Parish church
- Founded: 1876
- Founder: Joseph Paget
- Dedication: St Chad
- Dedicated: 1876

Architecture
- Functional status: Active
- Heritage designation: Grade II listed
- Designated: 22 October 1986
- Architectural type: Church
- Style: Gothic

Specifications
- Materials: Brick and stone, slate roof

Administration
- Province: York
- Diocese: Southwell and Nottingham
- Archdeaconry: Newark
- Deanery: Mansfield
- Parish: Mansfield Woodhouse

Clergy
- Vicar: Vacant

The Church of St Chad (also known as St Chad's) is in Pleasley Vale, Nottinghamshire, England. It was an active parish church until 2026 under the Church of England, in the deanery of Mansfield, the Archdeaconry of Newark, and the Southwell and Nottingham diocese. Its benefice has two churches, St Chad's and the main parish church, St Edmund. The church is recorded in the National Heritage List for England as a designated Grade II listed building.

== History ==
St Chad's was built by Joseph Paget after he inherited his parents' estate and consequently became a senior partner in nearby Pleasley Vale Mills. In 1876, deciding that his household and mill workers needed a church, a chapel was built overlooking the vale, on the Derbyshire side of the River Meden. The chapel was built of timber, painted white, by Cox & Sons of London.

After disagreement "over the style of services conducted in the church" Joseph Paget had the church dismantled and rebuilt just over the River Meden boundary in Nottinghamshire, thus moving it from the Diocese of Lichfield to the Diocese of Southwell and Nottingham. The church was reconstructed in brick and stone, with a bell tower and lead roof.

As of 2026, the church is no longer active or in use for worship, due to deteriorating wooden structure.

== Organ ==
The organ dates from 1880 by Lloyd & Co of Nottingham.

== See also ==
- Listed buildings in Mansfield (outer areas)

== Gallery ==
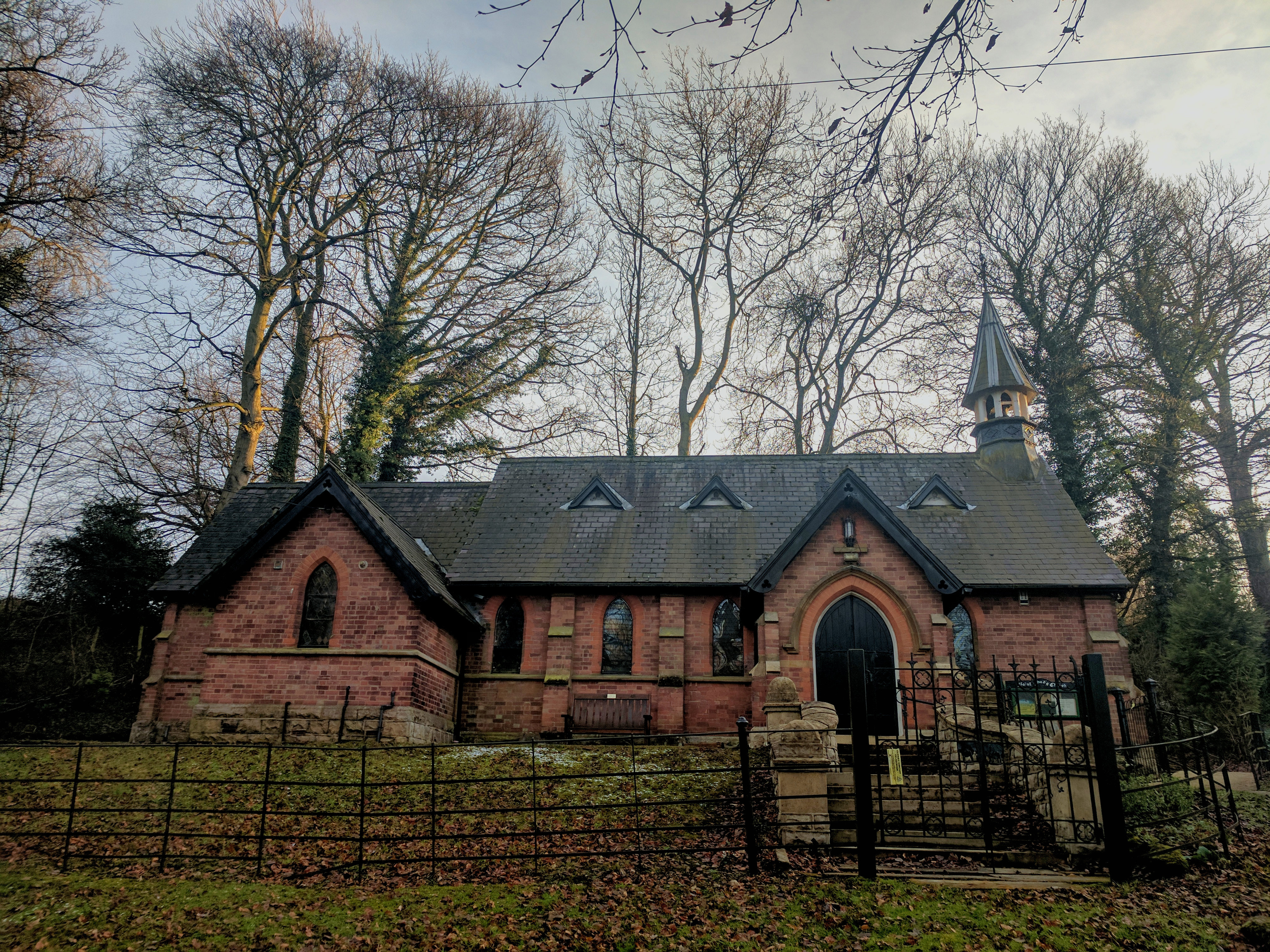
Side view with entrance

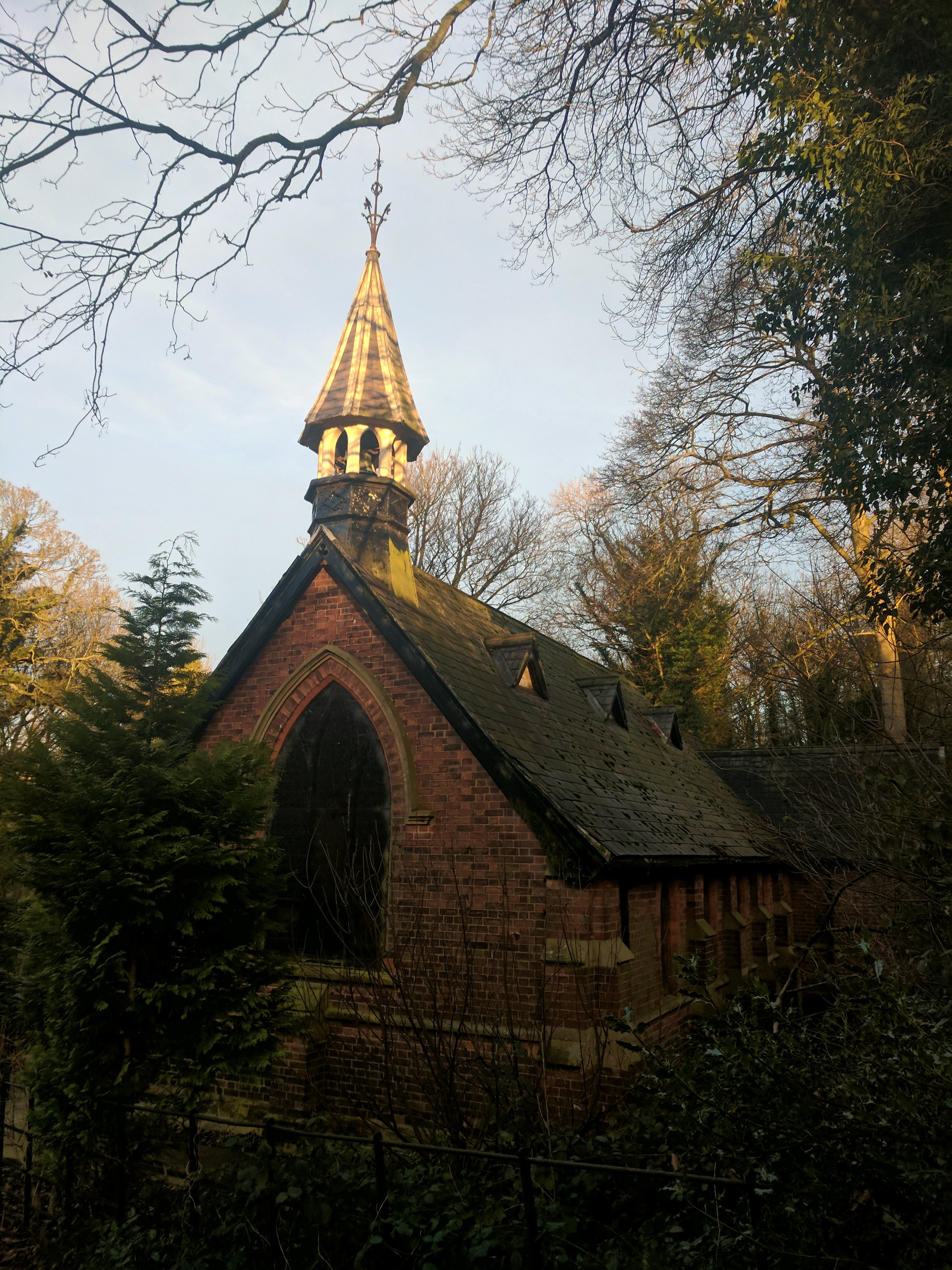
End view with spire

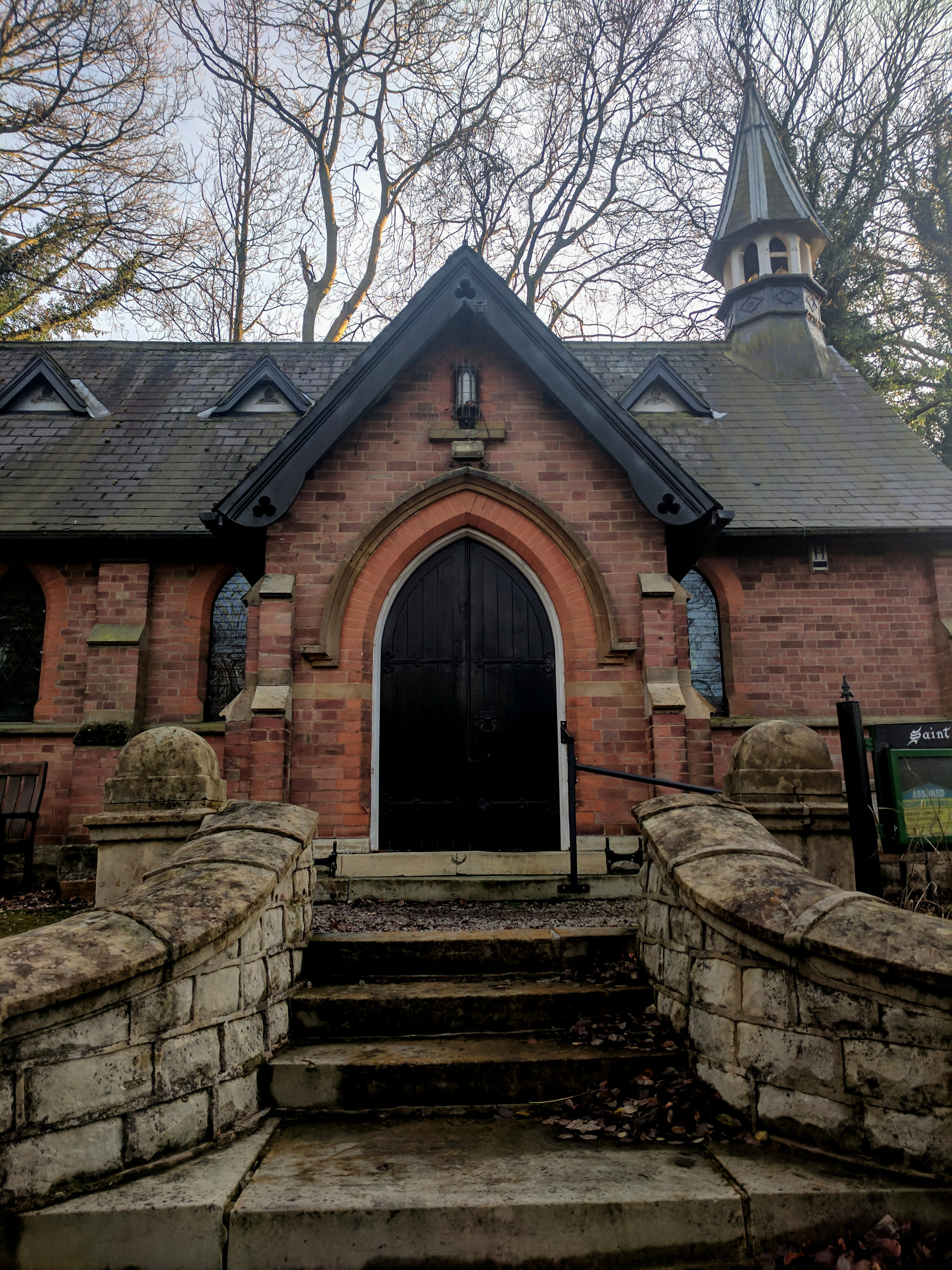
Close up of entrance
