= St Oswald's Church, Dunham-on-Trent =

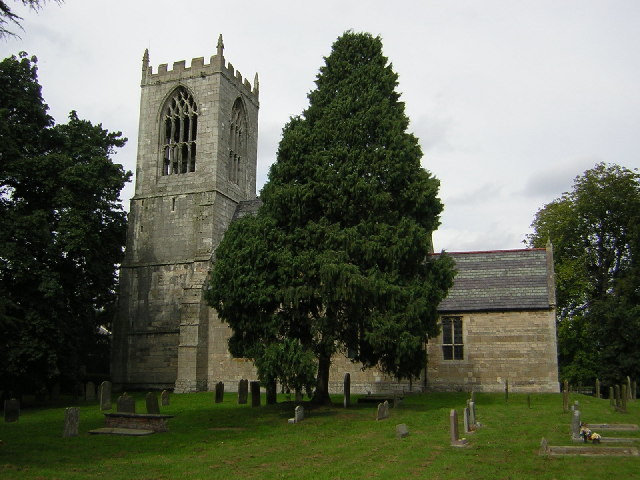
- St Oswald's Church, Dunham-on-Trent
- St Oswald's Church, Dunham-on-Trent
- 53°15′40.50″N 0°46′46.79″W
- OS grid reference: SK 81508 74487
- Location: Dunham, Nottinghamshire
- Country: England
- Denomination: Church of England

History
- Dedication: St Oswald

Architecture
- Heritage designation: Grade I listed

Administration
- Diocese: Diocese of Southwell and Nottingham
- Archdeaconry: Newark
- Deanery: Bassetlaw and Bawtry
- Parish: Dunham-on-Trent

St Oswald's Church, Dunham-on-Trent is a Grade I listed former parish church in the Church of England in Dunham, Nottinghamshire. The church is currently listed for sale.

== History ==
The church was built in the 15th century. The nave and chancel were rebuilt in 1862 by Thomas Chambers Hine.

Three headstones in the churchyard are Grade II listed. Dated 1729, 1738 and 1731, they are made from ashlar and bear the following inscriptions:

- In the centre, arched, rectangular headstone inscribed "Here lieth the body of Mary B....oll who departed this life March 7, 1729 aged 60 years".
- To the right is a decorative arched rectangular headstone with decorative incised lines under the arch and inscribed "Here lieth the body of Robert the son of John and Mary Wills who departed this life February the 19, 1738 aged 10 years".
- 2 metres to the right is the third arched rectangular headstone with inscription "Here lieth the body of Mary the wife of John Bacon who departed this life M.... 2. In the year of our Lord 1731."

Two gateways into the churchyard are also Grade II listed.

== See also ==
- Grade I listed buildings in Nottinghamshire
- Listed buildings in Dunham-on-Trent
