= Listed buildings in Farnsfield =

Farnsfield is a civil parish in the Newark and Sherwood district of Nottinghamshire, England. The parish contains 33 listed buildings that are recorded in the National Heritage List for England. All the listed buildings are designated at Grade II, the lowest of the three grades, which is applied to "buildings of national importance and special interest". The parish contains the village of Farnsfield and the surrounding countryside. Most of the listed buildings are houses, cottages and associated structures, farmhouses and farm buildings. The other listed buildings include a church, a sundial in the churchyard, a boundary stone, and a war memorial.

== Buildings ==
Name and location	Photograph	Date	Notes
St Michael's Church; 53.10219°N 1.03645°W		Early 15th century	The church was almost completely rebuilt in 1859–60 by Hine and Evans following a fire. It is built in stone with slate roofs, and consists of a nave with a gabled clerestory, north and south aisles, a north porch, a chancel, a north organ chamber, a south vestry and a southwest steeple. The steeple has a tower with three stages, on a plinth with a moulded band, with diagonal buttresses, and a two-light west window. Above the bell openings are half-dormers containing clock faces on the north and east sides, and the tower is surmounted by a spire with a weathervane.
Farnsfield Hall; 53.10197°N 1.03808°W	—	Late 17th century	A small country house that originated as a farmhouse, and was considerably extended in the later 18th century. It is in rendered brick with a modillion eaves cornice and a hipped slate roof. There are two storeys and five bays. In the centre is a doorway with a fanlight and a bracketed pediment. This is flanked by casement windows, in the upper floor are sash windows, and all the windows have wedge lintels and keystones. Recessed on the left is a brick wing with one and two storeys and three bays.
The Old School House; 53.10240°N 1.03305°W		Early 18th century	A house in red brick with floor bands, dentilled and dogtooth eaves and a pantile roof. There are two storeys and attics, four bays, and a two-storey rear wing. The windows are horizontally-sliding sashes with segmental heads.
Cockett Farmhouse; 53.11445°N 1.04188°W		Mid 18th century	The farmhouse is in red brick, with dressings in stone and brick, dogtooth eaves and a pantile roof. There are two storeys and attics, and three bays. In the centre is a porch with a coped gable and kneelers, and a round-arched entrance with a quoined surround, and a doorway with a moulded surround. The windows are casements with two or three lights. The windows in the outer bays of the top floor are semicircular with flush chamfered surrounds, and the others are rectangular with flush chamfered quoined surrounds.
Hexgreave Hall; 53.11779°N 1.02187°W		Mid 18th century	A small country house that was refronted in the late 19th century. It is in red brick with stone dressings, on a plinth, with chamfered quoins, a sill band, a cornice and a parapet. The main block has two storeys and attics, and three bays, the middle bay projecting slightly and flanked by quoins. In the centre is a four-centred arched doorway with a fanlight, moulded spandrels and an entablature. The windows are sashes with eared surrounds, two or three lights, and mullions. The main block is flanked by single-storey single-bay wings with dentilled eaves and hipped slate roofs, containing casement windows with four-centred arched heads and Gothic glazing.
Jasmine Cottage; 53.10171°N 1.03250°W		Mid 18th century	A house in red brick, with a floor band, dogtooth eaves, and a pantile roof with brick coped gables and kneelers. There are two storeys and six bays. On the front are two doorways under segmental arches, one with a fanlight. The windows are casements, those in the ground floor with segmental arches.
The Old Wheatsheaf and Drayman's Cottage; 53.10226°N 1.03232°W		Mid 18th century	A public house, later a house and a cottage, in rendered red brick on a plinth, with floor bands, dentilled and dogtooth eaves, and a roof of tile and pantile with brick coped gables and kneelers. There are two storeys and attics, and five bays. Four steps lead up to the doorway that has a fanlight. The windows in the lower two floors are sashes under segmental arches, and in the top floor they are casements.
Boundary Stone; 53.07860°N 1.08884°W		Late 18th century	The boundary stone is on the south side of Haywood Oaks Lane. It consists of a rectangular shaft 1 metre (3 ft 3 in) high, with a rounded head and an illegible inscription.
Burgess House and Cottage; 53.10265°N 1.03441°W		Late 18th century	The house and attached cottage are in red brick, on a plinth, with a hipped slate roof. The house, to the right, has a floor band, two storeys and three bays, the middle bay projecting slightly. Three steps lead up to the central doorway that has a moulded surround, a decorative fanlight, and a pediment on reeded brackets. The cottage is slightly recessed, and the same height, with two storeys and attics. Its doorway, and the windows in both parts, which are sashes, have flush wedge lintels and keystones.
Wall and gate, Burgess House and Cottage; 53.10242°N 1.03447°W		Late 18th century	At the entrance to the grounds is a decorative ogee-arched iron gate. This is flanked by a brick wall with stone coping rising to form piers at the ends and in the centre. The central piers have orb finials.
Church Farmhouse; 53.10266°N 1.03602°W		Late 18th century	The farmhouse is in red brick, with a moulded eaves band, and a pantile roof with brick coped gables and kneelers. There are two storeys and three bays. The central doorway has a fanlight, and the windows are sashes; all the openings have flush wedge lintels and keystones.
Barn, cattle shelter and wall, Church Farm; 53.10273°N 1.03565°W		Late 18th century	The barn is in red brick on a plinth, with dogtooth eaves, and a pantile roof with brick coped gables and kneelers, the left gable crow-stepped. The openings include a doorway with a segmental arch, openings with wooden shutters, and flight perches. On the right is a single-storey two-bay cattle shelter, and a brick wall.
Longlands; 53.10245°N 1.03968°W	—	Late 18th century	The house is in red brick with dogtooth eaves and a slate roof. There are two storeys and attics, and three bays, and at the rear are two two-storey two-bay wings. The central doorway has a moulded surround, a fanlight with Gothick glazing, and a keystone. This flanked by canted bay windows, and above are sash windows with flush wedge lintels and keystones.
Holdyke Cottage; 53.10270°N 1.03818°W		Late 18th century	Two cottages later combined into one, it is rendered, with a raised eaves band on the right, and tile roofs. There are two storeys and six bays, the right three bays higher. On the front is a gabled porch, and the windows are horizontally-sliding sashes, some with segmental heads.
Pot Shop Cottage; 53.10232°N 1.03483°W		Late 18th century	The house, at one time a shop, is in painted brick with dogtooth eaves and a pantile roof. There are two storeys and three bays. In the centre is a doorway with a flush wedge lintel. The is flanked by mullioned and transomed shop windows with pilasters and an entablature. The upper floor contains a window with a fixed light, flanked by horizontally-sliding sash windows.
Straws Cottage; 53.10205°N 1.03201°W		Late 18th century	The cottage is in red brick with dogtooth eaves and a pantile roof. There are two storeys and three bays, the right bay projecting and gabled. The windows are a mix of casements and sashes, some horizontally-sliding, and some with segmental heads.
Sundial; 53.10196°N 1.03634°W		Late 18th century	The sundial is in the churchyard of St Michael's Church to the south of the church. It consists of an octagonal stone column 1 metre (3 ft 3 in) high.
Wheatsheaf Cottage; 53.10220°N 1.03208°W		Late 18th century	A shop and a house, later a house, it is rendered, and has a raised eaves band and a hipped pantile roof. There are two storeys and three bays, and at the rear are a wing and a lean-to. In the centre is a doorway with a segmental arch, and to its right is a shop window with four arched lights, pilasters, a frieze and a cornice. The other windows are sashes, the ground floor window with a segmental head.
Coach House, Farnsfield Hall; 53.10229°N 1.03816°W	—	1818	The stable block, later converted into a house, is in rendered brick on a plinth, with overhanging eaves, and a hipped slate roof. There is a single storey and attics, and five bays, the middle bay projecting under a dated pediment, and to the right is a single-storey four-bay wing. On the front are five round-headed panels with imposts, two doorways and sash windows.
Charnwood House; 53.10219°N 1.03189°W		Early 19th century	A red brick house with dentilled eaves and a pantile roof. There are two storeys and three bays. The central doorway has a decorative fanlight, a flush wedge lintel and a keystone. The windows are sashes, and have rusticated wedge lintels and keystones. To the left is a single-storey single-bay extension containing a bow window.
Barn and outbuildings, Church Farm; 53.10287°N 1.03589°W	—	Early 19th century	The barn and outbuildings are in brick with pantile roofs. The barn has dentilled eaves, two storeys and three bays, and it contains a double door under a segmental arch, a fixed light and slit vents. To the right is a single-storey stable block, and to the left is a single-storey outbuilding with four bays.
Church House; 53.10230°N 1.03589°W		Early 19th century	The house, which has been divided, is in red brick, with dogtooth eaves, and a pantile roof with brick coped gables and kneelers. There are two storeys and three bays. In the centre is a round-arched doorway with a moulded surround, a semicircular fanlight and a keystone. The windows are sashes with wedge lintels and keystones.
Eastcot; 53.10308°N 1.03733°W	—	Early 19th century	Two cottages combined into a house in red brick with a raised eaves band and a pantile roof. There are two storeys and attics, and four bays. In the centre are two doorways with segmental heads, the right one blocked. In the outer bays are horizontally-sliding sash windows with segmental heads.
Farnsfield Hall Lodge, wall and gateway 53.10245°N 1.03795°W		Early 19th century	The lodge is in stone, partly rendered, and has a hipped slate roof with overhanging eaves. There is a single storey and attics, and three bays. In the centre is an open porch with a hipped roof supported on two piers, and a doorway with a moulded surround, and the windows are casements. Attached to the lodge is a coped stone wall containing a small gateway, it then curves to a larger gateway flanked by rusticated coped piers.
Lockup; 53.10439°N 1.03816°W		Early 19th century	The village lock-up is in red brick with dressings in stone and brick, and a slate roof, its gables treated as open pediments. There is a single storey and one bay. On the front is a doorway with a chamfered surround, in the right wall is an opening with a similar surround, and above the doorway is a lozenge-shaped vent.
Lower Hexgreave Farmhouse; 53.11214°N 1.01577°W		Early 19th century	The farmhouse is in stone on a plinth, with a moulded eaves cornice and a hipped slate roof. There are two storeys and five bays. Three steps lead up to a central doorway with pilasters, a fanlight with Gothick glazing, and an entablature. Above the doorway is a blocked opening, and the windows are sashes.
Barn, Old Manor Farm; 53.10195°N 1.03148°W		Early 19th century	The barn is in red brick with a moulded eaves band and a hipped pantile roof. There are two storeys and three bays. The barn contains a large doorway, flanked by slatted openings with overlights, under segmental arches.
Smith's Cottage; 53.10190°N 1.03191°W	—	Early 19th century	The cottage is in red brick with dentilled eaves and a pantile roof. There are two storeys and three bays. On the front are an off-centre doorway and horizontally-sliding sash windows. The ground floor openings have rendered wedge lintels.
Tehidy House; 53.10241°N 1.03372°W		Early 19th century	The house is in red brick with dentilled eaves and a pantile roof. There are two storeys and three bays. The central doorway has a fanlight, the windows are sashes, and all the openings have rendered lintels. In the right gable is an initialled plaque.
The Grange; 53.10164°N 1.03053°W		Early 19th century	A stone house on a plinth, with a modillion eaves cornice and a hipped slate roof. The main block has two storeys and three bays. In the centre is a porch with attached Doric columns, an entablature with a dentilled cornice, an arched entrance with a moulded archivolt and keystone, and a doorway with a decorative fanlight. Above the doorway is a cross casement window, and the other windows are sashes. Recessed to the right is a rendered single-storey single-bay wing, and to the left is a recessed two-storey two-bay wing.
Swan Lodge; 53.11767°N 1.02366°W		Mid 19th century	The lodge at the entrance to the grounds of Hexgreave Hall is in red brick on a chamfered plinth, with dentilled eaves, and a slate roof with terracotta coped crow-stepped gables. There is a single storey and an attic. On the centre is a doorway with a pointed arch, the windows are casements with pointed arches, and at the rear is a crow-stepped lean-to.
The Old Vicarage; 53.10271°N 1.04103°W		1871	The vicarage, later a private house, is in red brick on a plinth with a chamfered band, dressings in stone and blue brick, floor bands, dogtooth eaves, and a slate roof with stone coped gables and finials. There are two storeys and attics, and an irregular plan. The entrance front has a projecting bay containing a doorway with a pointed moulded arch, and sections of engaged columns with decorative capitals. Above the doorway is a sash window with a chamfered quoined surround, and in the gable is a trefoil.
War memorial 53.10241°N 1.03613°W		1922	The war memorial is in the churchyard of St Michael's Church, and is in Whitby stone. It consists of a Latin cross on a slender tapering shaft, on a square plinth, on a base of two steps, the lower step with a moulded cornice. On the cross is a fleur de lys and a bronze sword of sacrifice. On the base are plaques with inscriptions and the names of those lost in the two World Wars.
