= Samuel Rollinson =

English architect

Samuel Rollinson (1827 - 17 April 1891) was an English architect based in Chesterfield.

== Family ==
He was the son of Samuel Rollinson (b.1801) and Lydia Wardman (b.1806) and baptised on 30 March 1827 in Chesterfield.

On 29 April 1850 he married Lavinia Heald (b. 1830) in Bolsover, Derbyshire. This marriage produced the following children:

- Charles Wardman Rollinson (b. 1851)
- Alfred E Rollinson (b.1854)
- Walter Rollinson (b.1854)
- Frederick S Rollinson (b.1857)
- Arthur H Rollinson (b.1859)
- Tom Rollinson (b.1862)
- Edith L Robinson (b.1865)
- Florence E Rollinson (b.1867)
- Ernest Rollinson (b.1870)
- Anthony Rollinson (1871 - 1903)

On his death in 1891 he left an estate valued at £2,175 17s 3d (equivalent to £300,145 in 2023).

== Career ==
Initially he started work as a mason, and the clerk of the works to Chesterfield Grammar School. He then went as a pupil to Thomas Chambers Hine of Nottingham. When he returned to Chesterfield, he became surveyor of highways, and practiced privately as architect for new property on the estates of the Duke of Devonshire. One of his earliest projects was the north aisle of Hasland Church.

He set up a practice in Chesterfield and later entered into a partnership with his son, Arthur H. Rollinson, as S. Rollinson and Son.

He was architect to Brampton Brewery in Chesterfield. His son continued the business after Samuel’s death in 1891, designing many notable public houses in Chesterfield.

== New buildings ==
- St Michael and All Angels' Church, Sheldon 1864
- St Peter’s Church, Dunboyne, County Meath. 1866-1868
- Christ Church, Chesterfield 1869-1870
- Brimington cemetery chapel
- Chesterfield Board Schools
- Ashgate Industrial School of the Chesterfield Union.

== Restorations and alterations ==
- St Paul's Church, Hasland 1866
- St Mary the Virgin's Church, Beighton 1867-1868
- Holy Trinity Church, Chesterfield 1889
- Church of St Mary and All Saints, Chesterfield 1874. South transept door and window.
