= Listed buildings in Darlton =

Darlton is a civil parish in the Bassetlaw District of Nottinghamshire, England. The parish contains seven listed buildings that are recorded in the National Heritage List for England. Of these, one is listed at Grade II*, the middle of the three grades, and the others are at Grade II, the lowest grade. The parish contains the village of Darlton and the surrounding countryside. The listed buildings consist of a church, chest tombs in the churchyard, and the lychgate and wall at its entrance, a house, a farmhouse, and farm buildings.

== Key ==
Grade	Criteria
II*	Particularly important buildings of more than special interest
II	Buildings of national importance and special interest

== Buildings ==
Name and location	Photograph	Date	Notes	Grade
St Giles' Church; 53.25437°N 0.83417°W		c. 1200	The oldest part of the church is the tower, the rest being extensively restored between the 1850s and 1863 by T. C. Hine. The church is built in stone with tile roofs, and consists of a nave, a north aisle, a chancel, a north vestry and a west tower. The tower has three stages, string courses, clock faces on the south and west sides, two-light bell openings, and a pyramidal roof. The south doorway has a round-headed moulded arch, engaged columns with waterleaf capitals, and a dogtooth hood.	II*
Kingshaugh House; 53.25288°N 0.85505°W	—	Late 17th century	The house, which incorporates earlier masonry, has a ground floor in stone and the upper parts in brick, with quoins, a projecting string course, and roofs of tile and slate with coped gables and kneelers. There are two storeys and attics, a double depth plan, and a front of five bays. The doorway has a fanlight and the windows are sashes.	II
Barn, Manor Farm; 53.25298°N 0.84119°W		Mid 18th century	The barn is in red brick with dogtooth eaves, and a pantile roof with brick coped gables and kneelers. On the front is a double doorway and three windows with segmental heads.	II
Pigeoncote, stable blocks and outbuilding, Hall Farm; 53.25418°N 0.83375°W		Mid 18th century	The farm buildings are in red brick with dentilled eaves and pantile roofs. The pigeoncote has two storeys and an attic, and a single bay. It contains a doorway with a segmental arch, and above are entrances and perches for the pigeons. To its left is a six-bay stable block containing doorways with stable doors under segmental arches, and to the right is a two-bay outbuilding.	II
Manor Farmhouse; 53.25285°N 0.84151°W		Late 18th century	The farmhouse is in red brick with a pantile roof. There are two storeys and attics, three bays, and an earlier lower two-storey rear wing. The central doorway has a fanlight and a projecting lintel, and the windows are sashes.	II
Three chest tombs 53.25441°N 0.83381°W		c. 1818	The group of three chest tombs is in the churchyard of St Giles' Church. The tombs are in stone, two are rectangular, one has a coffin shape, and all are decorated with stylised crosses. They are enclosed by decorative iron railings on a chamfered stone base, and at each corner is a hollow iron pier decorated with blind and open tracery.	II
Lychgate and walls, St Giles' Church; 53.25426°N 0.83435°W		Mid 19th century	The lychgate at the entrance to the churchyard has a stone base, a timber superstructure with open decorative panels, and a gabled tile roof with decorative bargeboards and pendants. On the roof are decorative iron crosses. The lychgate is flanked by low stone walls with chamfered coping, which partly enclose the churchyard.	II
