= Darlton =

Coordinates: 53.25°N 0.84°W

- Village and Civil parish
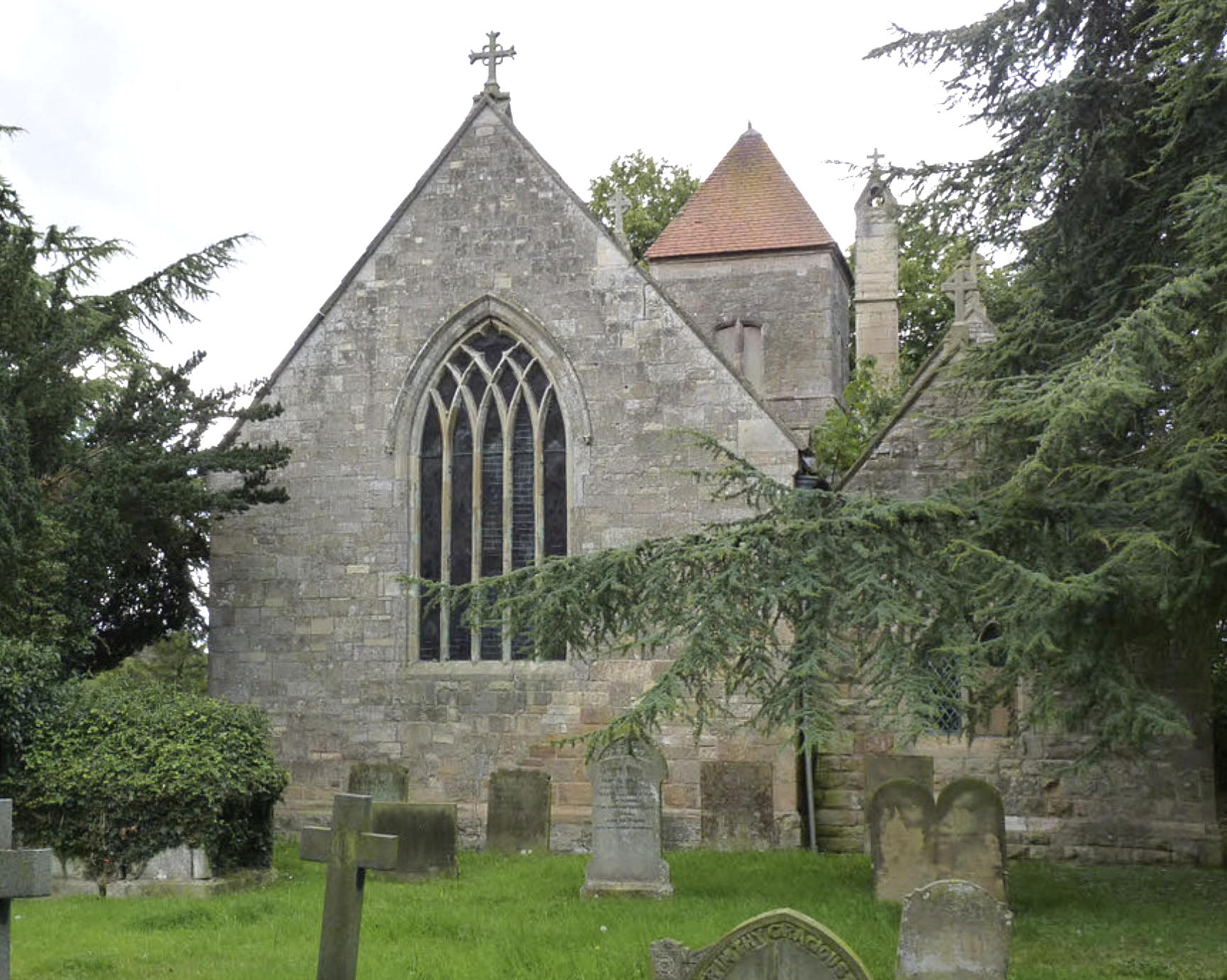
- St Giles Church

- Location within Nottinghamshire
- Interactive map of Darlton
- Area: 2.34 sq mi (6.1 km^{2})
- Population: 118
  - Density: 50/sq mi (19/km^{2})
- OS grid reference: SK 773735
  - London: 125 mi (201 km) SE
- District: Bassetlaw
- Shire county: Nottinghamshire
- Region: East Midlands
- Country: England
- Sovereign state: United Kingdom
- Post town: NEWARK
- Postcode district: NG22
- Dialling code: 01777
- Police: Nottinghamshire
- Fire: Nottinghamshire
- Ambulance: East Midlands
- UK Parliament: Newark
- Website: Dunham and District Parish Council

Darlton is a small village and civil parish in the Bassetlaw district of Nottinghamshire, England. It is on the A57 road about 3 miles (4.8 km) north-east of Tuxford.

The population of the civil parish was 102 at the 2001 Census, increasing to 110 at the 2011 Census, and 118 in 2021.

The Church of England parish church of St Giles dates from the beginning of the 13th century and is in the Transitional style. In 1855 it was heavily restored by the architect T.C. Hine.

Kingshaugh House was originally a hunting lodge built to serve the eastern Le Clay division of Sherwood Forest. It was fortified with earthworks in a rebellion of 1196 against King John. A new lodge was built in 1210–11 at a cost of £550 but was abandoned after 1217. The present Kingshaugh House is a late 17th-century farmhouse that appears to incorporate some masonry from the lodge.

Darlton is the birthplace of Charles Read (1604–1669), who became a wealthy shipper in Kingston upon Hull. In 1667 Read founded a grammar school and a set of almshouses at Drax in Yorkshire. When Read died, his will founded further grammar schools at Tuxford in Nottinghamshire and Corby Glen in Lincolnshire.

The site of Whimpton Village, a deserted medieval village, is about 1 mile (1.6 km) east of Darlton.

== See also ==
- Listed buildings in Darlton
