= St Giles' Church, Darlton =

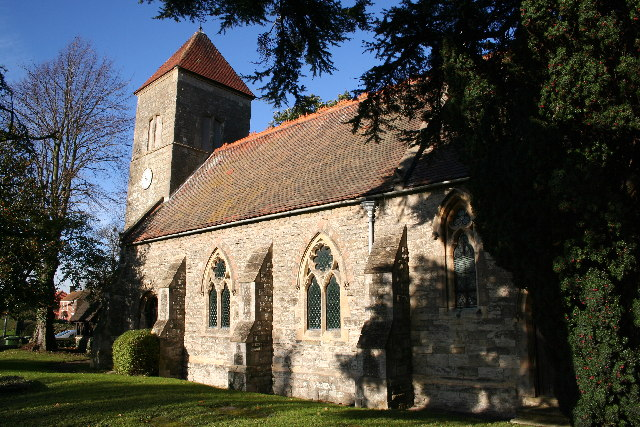
- St Giles' Church, Darlton
- St Giles' Church, Darlton
- 53°15′13.33″N 0°50′1.82″W
- Location: Darlton
- Country: England
- Denomination: Church of England

History
- Dedication: St Giles

Architecture
- Functional status: Redundant
- Heritage designation: Grade II* listed

Administration
- Province: York
- Diocese: Diocese of Southwell and Nottingham
- Archdeaconry: Newark
- Deanery: Bassetlaw and Bawtry
- Parish: Darlton

Clergy
- Vicar: Rev J Jesson (Responsibility of Parish)

St Giles' Church, Darlton is a Grade II* listed parish church in the Church of England in Darlton.

== History ==
The church dates from the beginning of the 13th century. The chancel and nave were rebuilt in 1863 by Thomas Chambers Hine.

The churchyard contains three Grade II listed chest tombs, and the lychgate and churchyard walls are also Grade II listed.

== See also ==
- Grade II* listed buildings in Nottinghamshire
- Listed buildings in Darlton
