= Holy Trinity Church, Chesterfield =

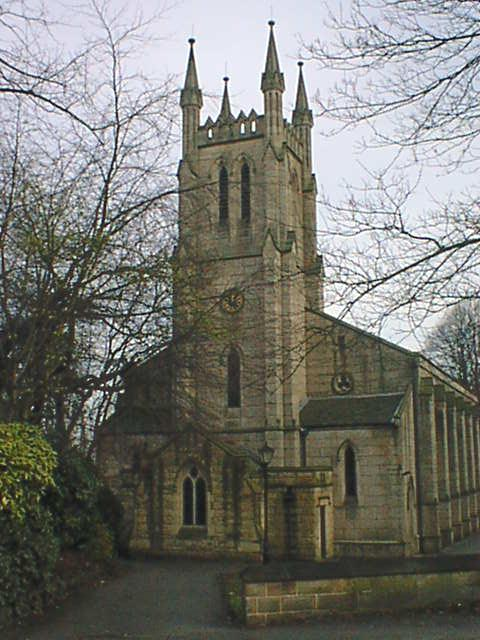
- Holy Trinity Church, Chesterfield
- Holy Trinity Church, Chesterfield
- 53°14′24.53″N 1°25′43.61″W
- Location: Chesterfield
- Country: England
- Denomination: Church of England
- Website: holytrinityandchristchurch.org

History
- Dedication: Holy Trinity

Architecture
- Heritage designation: Grade II listed
- Architect: Thomas Johnson
- Completed: 1838

Administration
- Diocese: Diocese of Derby
- Archdeaconry: Chesterfield
- Deanery: Chesterfield
- Parish: Chesterfield Holy Trinity and Christ Church

Holy Trinity Church, Chesterfield is a Grade II listed parish church in the Church of England in Chesterfield, Derbyshire.

== History ==
The foundation stone was laid on 17 May 1837 by the Duke of Devonshire. It was built to the designs of the architect Thomas Johnson. Alterations were made in 1889 by Samuel Rollinson, and a new choir vestry was added in 1938.

The church is well known as the site of the grave of the railway engineer, George Stephenson, who died in 1848. A plain memorial slab is positioned in the floor of the sanctuary. The stained glass window at the east end of the church was erected by his son Robert.

The church is in a joint parish with Christ Church, Chesterfield.

== Monuments and Memorials ==
- George Stephenson (died 1848)

== Organ ==
The church had a pipe organ by Brindley and Foster dating from 1868. A specification of the organ can be found on the National Pipe Organ Register.
