= Hasland =

Suburb of Chesterfield, Derbyshire, England

Coordinates: 53.2203°N 1.4065°W

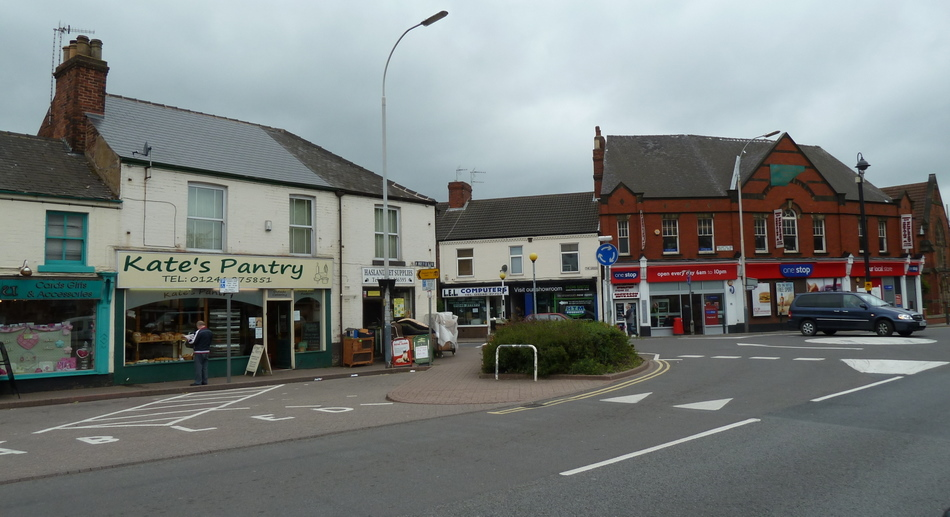
- Mansfield Road looking towards The Green.

- Location within Derbyshire
- Population: 6,969 (Ward 2011)
- OS grid reference: SK395698
- District: Chesterfield
- Shire county: Derbyshire
- Region: East Midlands
- Country: England
- Sovereign state: United Kingdom
- Post town: CHESTERFIELD
- Postcode district: S41
- Dialling code: 01246
- Police: Derbyshire
- Fire: Derbyshire
- Ambulance: East Midlands
- UK Parliament: Chesterfield

Hasland is a suburb of Chesterfield in the Borough of Chesterfield in Derbyshire, England. Hasland is located south of Spital, east of Birdholme and north of Grassmoor. Hasland ward had a population of 6,615 on the 2011 Census. Despite the name, most of Hasland is not included in the parish of Grassmoor, Hasland and Winsick, in North East Derbyshire, which lies to the south of the suburb.

== Eastwood Park ==
In 1913, Alderman Eastwood (Mayor of Chesterfield, 1905–1908) donated the park to the public in memory of his late father. The Deputy Mayor, Ald. C.P. Markham, showed enormous gratitude in accepting the gift: "Hasland is now set up for all time. It has got a very wide street and Ald. Eastwood has finished it off by giving one of the most handsome parks there will be in this part of the world". The first condition on donating the park was that it should be called "Hasland Park", however Eastwood later accepted the council's decision to name the park "Eastwood Park".

Eastwood Park was closed for over 6 months in September 2012, as part of a major restoration project. Chesterfield Borough Council received £1.07m from the Heritage Lottery Fund and contributed a further £201,000. The original four-week closure was extended following complications in planning and construction work, partially due to flooding in early 2013. The restoration project includes improvements to the Hasland Village Hall and fountain, modernisation of play areas, a new sports pavilion and a new multi-use games area. The council also announced plans to rename the park to Eastwood Park, a Queen Elizabeth II Field, as part of the legacy of the Queen's Diamond Jubilee.

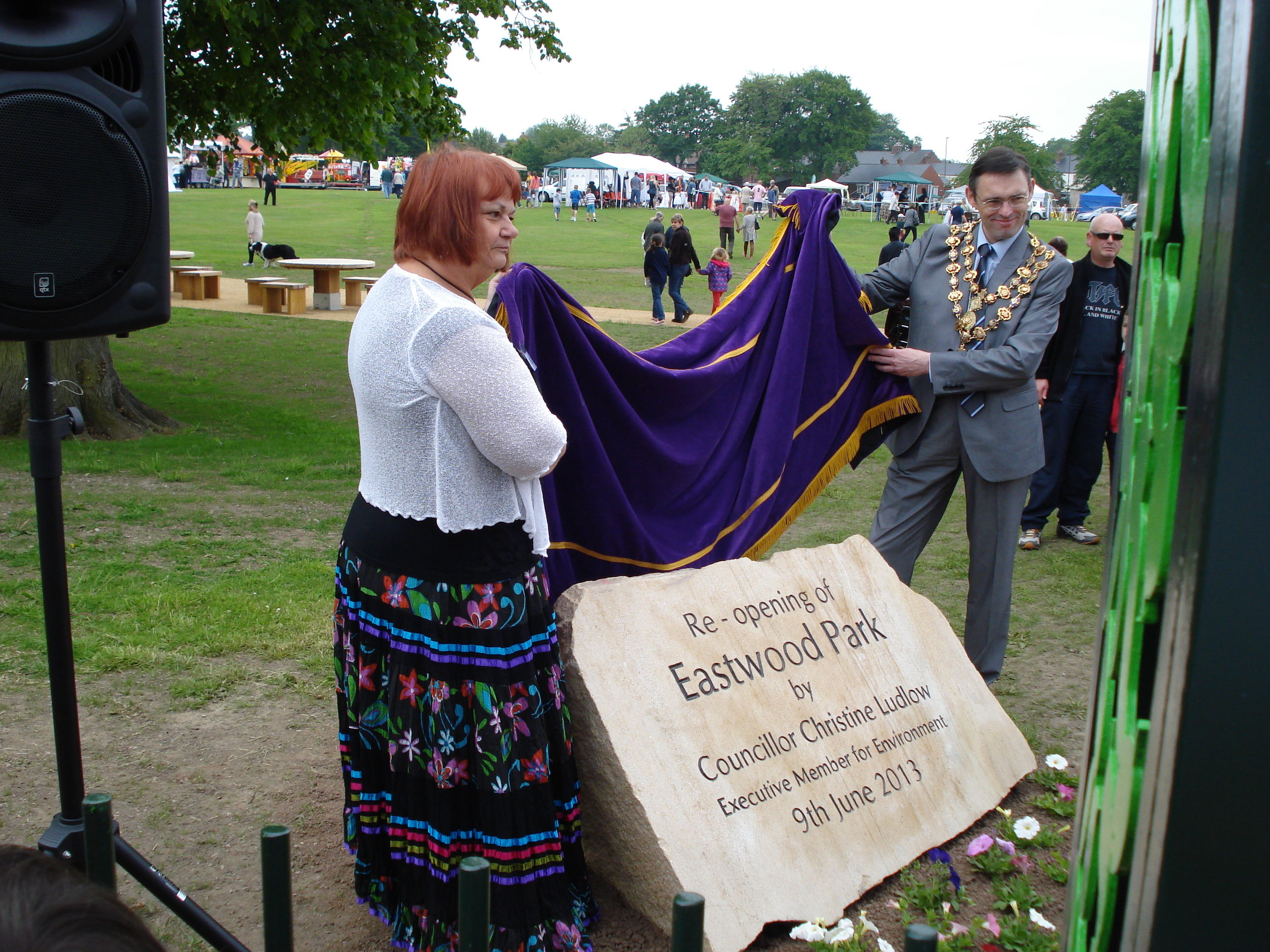
Eastwood Park Reopening Stone, 2013

== Churches ==
The Methodist Church was founded in a cottage on Chapel Lane East in 1831 and moved to its present site (on Hampton Street) in 1901.

St Paul's Church, Hasland is an Anglican church, the parish church of Hasland, and was built in 1850 in the south of Hasland. Before this church was built, most people were baptised, married and buried at the Church of St. Mary and All Saints (also an Anglican church) in Chesterfield town centre.

A Baptist Chapel was present in Eyre Street East in the 1920s when it operated a short distance from its present premises, which were built in 1937. A church hall was subsequently built opposite in the 1970s.

== Schools ==
There are three schools in Hasland, providing education for pupils aged 4–16. There is no sixth form in Hasland, however students normally continue their education at the nearby Chesterfield College or a local sixth form.

Hasland Infant School is situated on Eyre Street East and opened in 1904. The Infant School has recently added an extra block of buildings, and is now bigger, with a newer nursery part of the school. Hasland Junior School is situated on The Green, and Hasland Hall Community School (the secondary school) is on Broomfield Avenue.

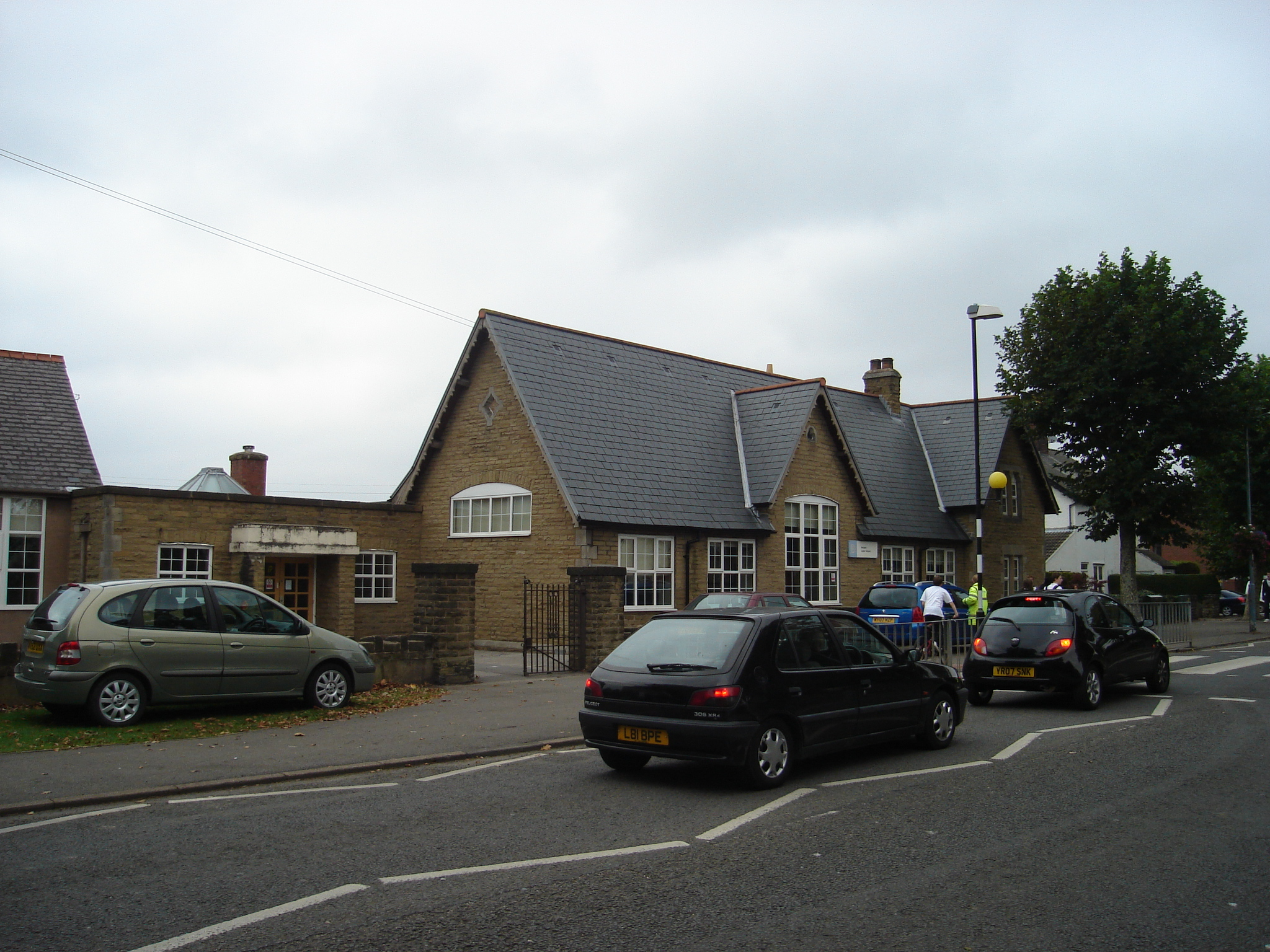
The original Church School building on The Green

Hasland Junior School is a medium-sized school, catering for about 400 pupils. Before the opening of the new building in September 2007, the school occupied a large split site separated by a busy road, and there was a great deal of movement between the two sites. The new site is now located on the same side of the road as Hasland Hall Community School. The foundation stone of the original school was laid in 1864.

Outwood Academy Hasland Hall is situated on Broomfield Avenue. It currently caters for around 880 students. Before March 2021 it was known as Hasland Hall Community School.

== Scouts and Guides ==
Hasland has a thriving Scout group consisting of a Beaver Colony, a Cub Pack, a Scout Troop, two Rainbow Units, three Brownie Packs and two Guide Groups. 1st Hasland Scouts meet weekly at the St Leonards Mission at Spital. The Scouts, Cub Scouts and Beaver Scouts participate in the Annual Remembrance Service, held in Eastwood Park and the St. Georges Day parade in the town centre and Queens Park.

== Notable people ==
Notable residents Hasland include:

- George Green (1880–1940), cricketer.
- Richard Suttle (1928–2010), cricketer.
- William Edwin Harvey (1852–1914), MP.
- John Wagstaffe (1633–1677), writer.
- Phil "Philthy Animal" Taylor (1954–2015), drummer from Motorhead and buried at Hasland Cemetery
- Dr John Iball FRSE (1907-1993) physicist
