= Corn Exchange, Nottingham =

Commercial building in Nottingham, Nottinghamshire, England

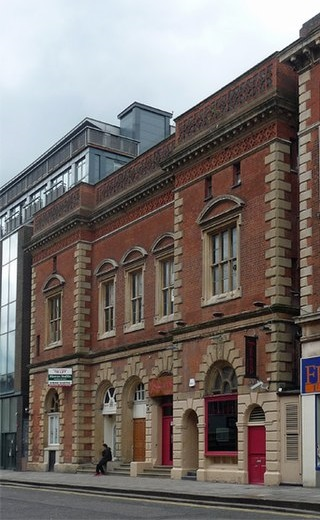
- Corn Exchange, Nottingham

- Shown in Nottinghamshire
- 52.9541°N 1.1463°W
- Location: Thurland Street, Nottingham

History
- Built: 1850

Site notes
- Architect: Thomas Chambers Hine
- Architectural style: Italianate style

Listed Building – Grade II
- Official name: Corn Exchange and Clinton Rooms
- Designated: 30 November 1995
- Reference no.: 1255190

The Corn Exchange is a commercial building in Thurland Street, Nottingham, Nottinghamshire, England. The structure, which is now used as an events venue, is a Grade II listed building.

== History ==
Until the mid-19th century, corn merchants in Nottingham carried out their trade in the northwest corner of the Nottingham Exchange. In the early 1840s, a group of local businessmen decided to form a private company, to be known as the "Nottingham Corn Exchange Company", to finance and commission a purpose-built corn exchange for the town. The site they selected had been occupied by Thurland Hall, which dated from 1458, but was demolished in the 1830s. Henry Pelham-Clinton, 4th Duke of Newcastle, whose seat was at Clumber Park, gave permission for his land to be used in 1845.

The building was designed by Thomas Chambers Hine in the Italianate style, built in red brick with ashlar stone dressings at a cost of £3,000, and was officially opened on 6 April 1850. The design involved a symmetrical main frontage of five bays facing Thurland Street, with the end bays slightly projected forward. The central section of three bays featured round headed openings with archivolts and voussoirs on the ground floor and cross windows with architraves and segmental-headed pediments on the first floor. The outer bays featured openings with archivolts and voussoirs on the ground floor and mullioned casement windows with architraves and segmental-headed pediments on the first floor. There were quoins at the corners and a terracotta frieze with strapwork, a modillioned cornice and a parapet at roof level. Internally, the principal room the main hall, which was 77 feet (23 m) long and 55 feet (17 m) wide.

The Nottingham Chamber of Commerce, which was formed in the building in 1863, retained offices in the building for many years. However, the use of the building as a corn exchange declined significantly in the wake of the Great Depression of British Agriculture in the late 19th century. The building subsequently operated as a public events venue: functions held there in the early 20th century included the annual exhibition of the Nottingham Society of Artists, and, in April 1922, it hosted the Thirtieth Annual Conference of the Independent Labour Party.

Later in the century, the building operated as a concert venue known as the "Clinton Rooms" (the name recalled the Pelham-Clinton family): performers included the avant-pop group Stereolab in March 1996. It went on to serve as O'Reilly's, a public house with an Irish theme, from the late 1990s, the Jongleurs Comedy Club, a theatrical venue with a comedy theme, from 2010, and the Roxy Ball Room, a dance venue with an indoor sports theme, from 2017.

== See also ==
- Corn exchanges in England
