= Christ Church, Chesterfield =

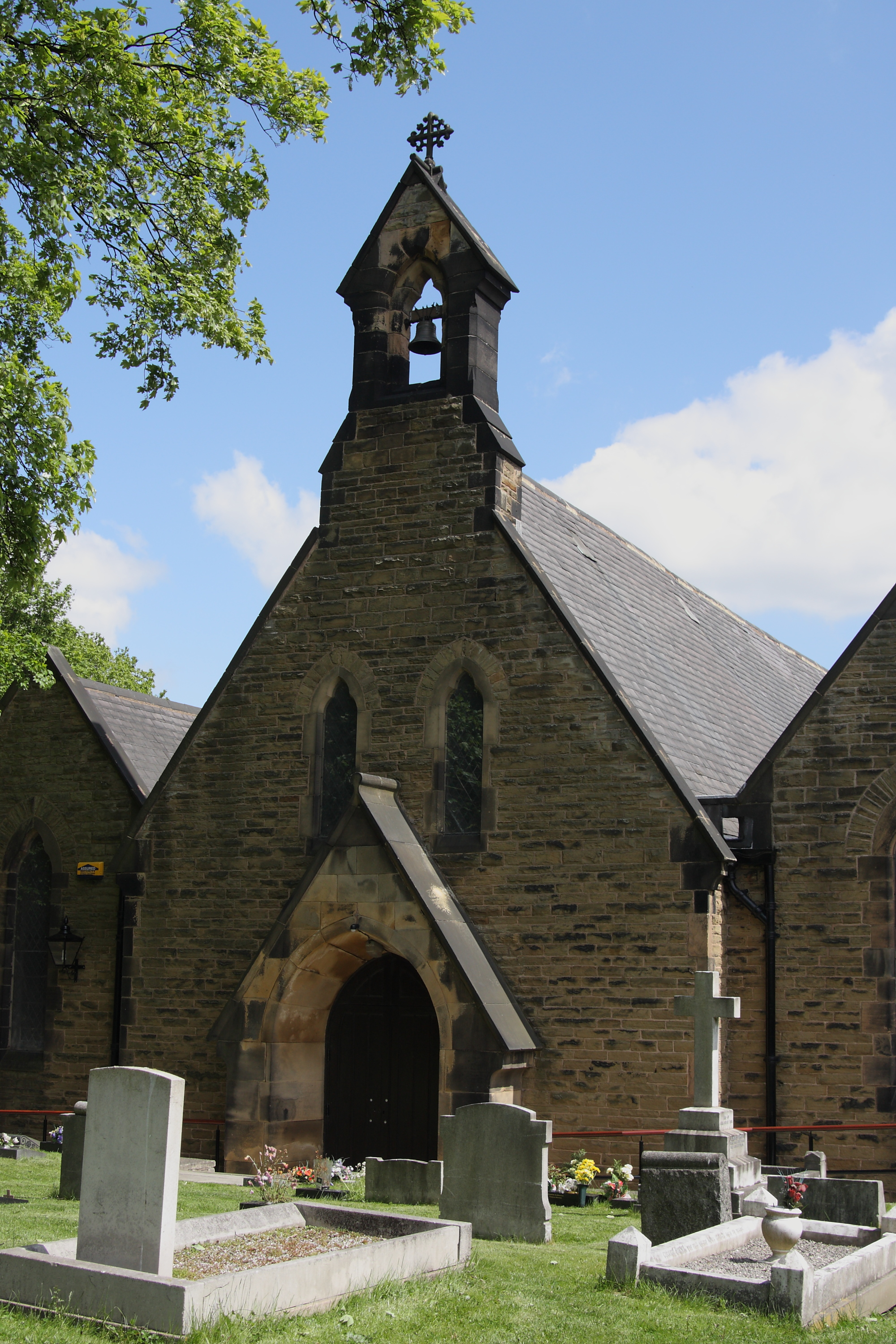
- Christ Church, Chesterfield
- Christ Church, Chesterfield
- 53°14′46.14″N 1°25′31.17″W
- Location: Chesterfield
- Country: England
- Denomination: Church of England
- Website: holytrinityandchristchurch.org

History
- Dedication: Christ Church
- Consecrated: 20 September 1870

Architecture
- Architect: Samuel Rollinson
- Groundbreaking: 5 September 1869

Specifications
- Length: 58 feet (18 m)
- Width: 21 feet (6.4 m)

Administration
- Diocese: Diocese of Derby
- Archdeaconry: Chesterfield
- Deanery: Chesterfield
- Parish: Chesterfield Holy Trinity and Christ Church

Christ Church, Chesterfield is a parish church in the Church of England in Chesterfield, Derbyshire.

== History ==
The foundation stone was laid on 5 September 1869 by the Revd. Thomas Hill, Archdeacon of Derby. It was built to the designs of Samuel Rollinson and consecrated on 20 September 1870 by the Bishop of Lichfield. The Derbyshire Times and Chesterfield Herald of 24 September 1870 describes the building

The Church consists of a simple rectangle, 58 feet long by 21 feet wide, with apsidal east end, embracing nave and chancel under one roof, with the addition of a south porch and a vestry on the north side, as also a bell turret on the western gable. The roof is open timbered; the benches, pulpit, lectern and reading desk, are all of deal, stained and varnished. The church is well lighted on all sides, and the windows are glazed in quarries with cathedral tinted glass. It is also warmed by hot water, the apparatus being supplied by Messrs. Oliver and Co. The remainder of the works have been creditably executed by Messrs. Maw and Heathcote, from the designs and under the immediate superintendence of Mr. S Rollinson, at a cost of about £700. The site is the gift of the late J. Robinson, Esq.

The church is in a joint parish with Holy Trinity Church, Chesterfield.

== Organ ==
The church had a pipe organ probably by Brindley and Foster dating from the 1870s. A specification of the organ can be found on the National Pipe Organ Register.
