= John Wagstaffe =

English writer on witchcraft

John Wagstaffe (1633–1677) was an English writer on witchcraft.

== Life ==
Wagstaffe, born in Cheapside in 1633, was the son of John Wagstaffe of London. He was educated at St. Paul's School, and was Pauline exhibitioner from 1649 to 1658. He matriculated from Oriel College, Oxford, on 22 Nov 1650, proceeded B.A. on 18 Oct 1653, and M.A. on 9 July 1656. He was incorporated at Cambridge University in 1668. On the death of his uncle he succeeded to his estate at Hasland in Derbyshire. Anthony Wood says that after taking his degrees he "applied himself to the study of politics and learning". He wrote little, and injured his health by the "continued bibbing of strong and high-tasted liquors".

Wagstaffe died "in a manner distracted" at his lodgings in Holborn, opposite Chancery Lane, on 2 September 1677, and was buried in Guildhall Chapel. He was unmarried. Letters of administration were granted to his aunt (father's sister), Judith How, on 4 September 1677.

== Writings ==
Wagstaffe published:

- Historical Reflections on the Bishop of Rome, Oxford, 1660.
- The Question of Witchcraft debated, London, 1669, 1671, 1711 (in German under the title of Ausgeführte Materie der Hexerey, oder die Meinung derjenigen, die glauben dass es Hexen gebe, deutlich widerlegt). He threw doubt on the truth of the alleged instances of contracts between spirits and men and women, pronouncing them to be "ridiculously absurd". His position was assailed by Méric Casaubon in the second part of his book Of Credulity and Incredulity, 1670, and in The Opinion of Witchcraft vindicated, by R. T., 1670. The attacks called forth a second and enlarged edition of Wagstaffe's book.

He also contributed a Greek poem to Britannia Rediviva, Oxford, 1660.
