= Whimpton Village =

Deserted medieval village in Nottinghamshire, England

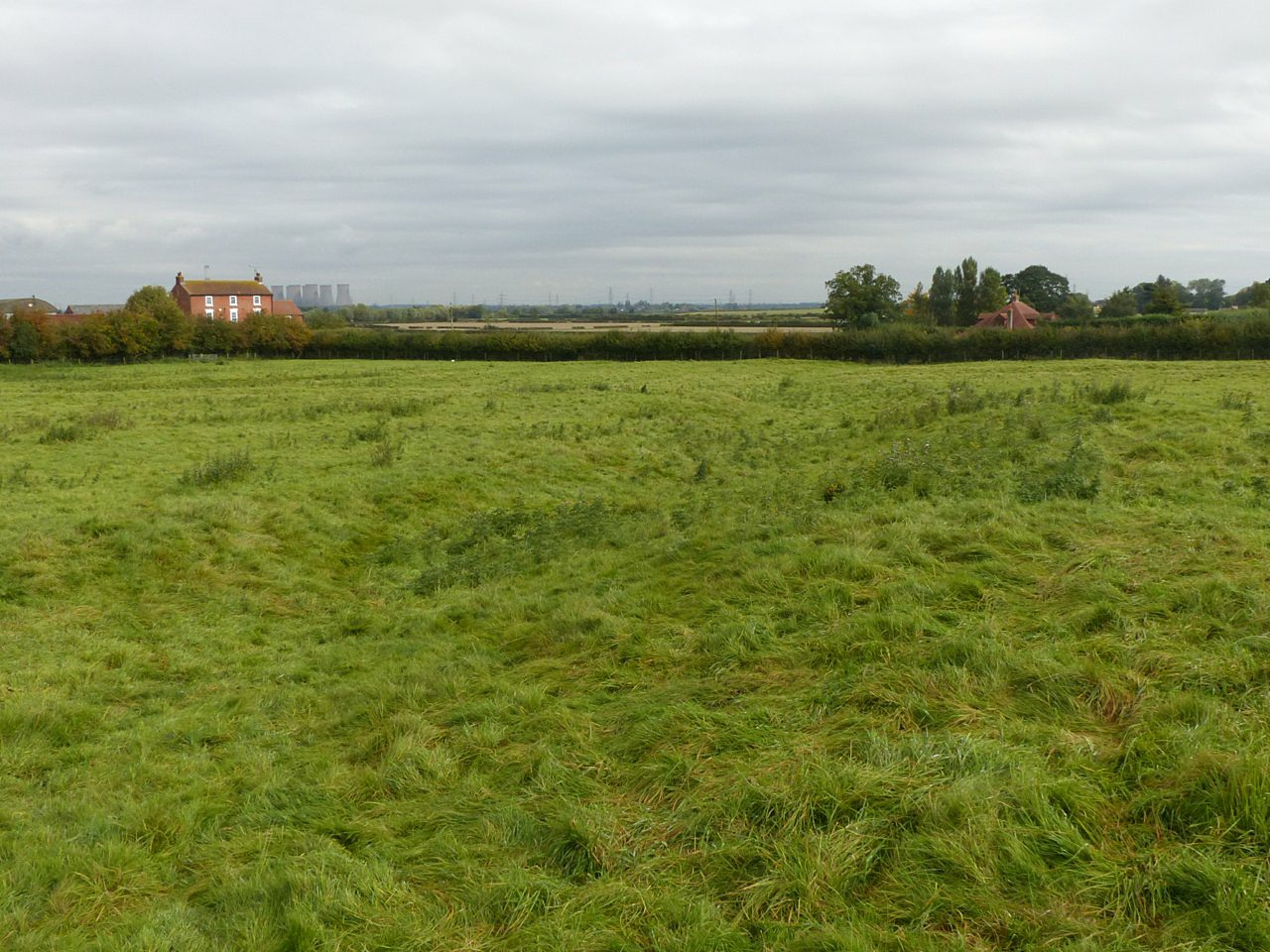
- Looking north-east across the site. The ditch running away from the camera is a roadway separating the village on the left from a field on the right.

- Location within Nottinghamshire
- 53°15′21″N 0°49′0″W
- Location: Nottinghamshire
- OS grid reference: SK 791 739

Scheduled monument
- Designated: 13 February 1953
- Reference no.: 1017567

Whimpton Village is a deserted medieval village in Nottinghamshire, England. It is near the A57 road between the villages of Darlton and Dunham-on-Trent. It is a Scheduled Monument.

== History ==
Whimpton is mentioned, as Wimentun, in the Domesday Book; it is described there as one of the four berewicks of the King's Manor of Duneham (Dunham). A berewick was a detached, partly independent portion of a manor. The village (spelled also Wimpton or Wymton) is mentioned in pipe rolls in the 12th, 13th and 14th centuries, mentioning land and inhabitants of the village. The village evidently did not exist by 1547, since in that year there was an inquisition post mortem on the properties of Robert Nevyll, in which Whimpton is only a field name.

== Earthworks ==
The surviving remains of the village are earthworks mostly in a field, on rising ground, south of the A52 road; some are north of the road, near Whimpton House. There is a roadway, widest at the centre and narrower at either end, running from west to east across the field south of the modern road, following the ridge of the hill. To the south of this roadway is evidence of past cultivation.

Two roads lead north from the roadway, taking winding courses towards the A57 road. The one in the east continues beyond the modern road and ends at a rectangular enclosure, 38 metres (125 ft) east to west by 23 metres (75 ft) north to south, surrounded by a ditch of width 7.5 metres (25 ft); this is thought to be a moated homestead.

On the site south of the modern road there are rectangular enclosures, marked by low banks and ditches, each with a raised rectangular platform; these are the remains of walls and foundations of medieval houses. There is a large enclosure between the two road running north from the west–east roadway, marked by low banks on the north, west and east sides; it is about 61 metres (200 ft) west to east and 46 metres (151 ft) north to south, and faces onto the widest part of the roadway. It is thought this may be the village green in the centre of the village; there are no structural remains here, but there are two hollows, which may be ponds.

To the west, south and east of the village can be seen the ridge and furrow pattern, surviving to a height of 0.5 metres (1 ft 8 in), of the medieval open-field system.

== See also ==
- List of lost settlements in the United Kingdom
