= John Iball =

British physicist and crystallographer

John Iball FRSE FIP (1907–1993) was a British physicist and crystallographer. He made major advances in cancer research. He gives his name to the Iball Index: the relative potency of carcinogenic compounds.

== Life ==
He was born in Hasland near Chesterfield in Derbyshire on 1 February 1907. He attended Alun County School in Mold, Flintshire from 1919 to 1925. He then went to study Mathematics and Physics at the College of North Wales in Bangor. He graduated with a first class degree (BSc) in Physics in 1928. In 1929 he received a Diploma in Education then won a research scholarship which resulted in a further degree (MSc) and doctorate (PhD) from the University of Wales in 1932. From 1932 to 1934 (under a Fellowship from the University of Wales) he did further research at the Davy Faraday Laboratory at the Royal Institution in London under the Sir William Lawrence Bragg.

Here he did X-ray studies on organic materials, particularly those of carcinogenic properties. Resultantly, in 1934 he began working in the Research Institute of the Royal Cancer Hospital, London. He did extensive studies on both the causative and curative effects of X-rays on cancer: a very delicate balance. During this period he did a study visit to Prague to visit the laboratory of Prof Jaroslav Heyrovsky to specialise further in polarography. The University of Wales awarded him a second doctorate (DSc) in 1939.

During the Second World War he worked on rocketry technology for the Ministry of Supply, based at the Projectile Development Establishment at Aberporth on the Welsh coast. This included several trans-Atlantic sea trips to pass specialist knowledge to the Americans. After the war he went into the commercial world for some years, working in the Physics laboratory of the Research Department for Unilever in Port Sunlight. His main research here was on the effects of X-rays on emulsions (1946–47).

On 1 January 1948 he joined University College, Dundee (later the University of Dundee) in Scotland. He remained there for the rest of his working life, being given an Honorary Professorship (in Chemistry) in 1957. Under his leadership Dundee became a centre for X-ray crystallography and macro-molecular photography. The University of Dundee Museum Services hold a collection of Iball's original diagrams and electron density maps.

In 1950 he was elected a Fellow of the Royal Society of Edinburgh. His proposers were George Dawson Preston, Edward Thomas Copson, James Forrest and Robert Percival Cook. In 1952 he became a Research Fellow in the British Empire Cancer Campaign (renamed the Cancer Research Campaign in 1970).

While in Dundee, Iball set up the Tayside and Fife Branch of the British Association for the Advancement of Science and offered assistance to local industries with any scientific matters.

He died at 11 Glamis Terrace in Dundee on 21 January 1993, shortly before his 86th birthday.

== Family ==
Iball had one daughter, Dorothy, by his wife Margaret.
