= Listed buildings in Dunham-on-Trent =

Dunham-on-Trent is a civil parish in the Bassetlaw District of Nottinghamshire, England. The parish contains eleven listed buildings that are recorded in the National Heritage List for England. Of these, one is listed at Grade I, the highest of the three grades, and the others are at Grade II, the lowest grade. The parish contains the village of Dunham-on-Trent and the surrounding area. The listed buildings consist of houses and cottages, farmhouses and farm buildings, a church and items in the churchyard, a public house and a war memorial.

== Key ==
Grade	Criteria
I	Buildings of exceptional interest, sometimes considered to be internationally important
II	Buildings of national importance and special interest

== Buildings ==
Name and location	Photograph	Date	Notes	Grade
St Oswald's Church; 53.26115°N 0.77956°W		15th century	The oldest part of the church is the tower, the rest being rebuilt in 1862. The church is built in stone with slate roofs, and consists of a nave, a north aisle, a chancel and a west tower. The tower has four stages, diagonal crocketed buttresses, string courses, gargoyles, and an embattled parapet with corner crocketed pinnacles. On the west side is a doorway with a pointed arch, and a hood mould, above which is a niche with an ogee head, crockets, and a hood mould with an ornate finial. Over this is a four-light window with a moulded surround, and a hood mould, and the bell openings are large and traceried, with four arched and cusped lights.	I
Dunham House, walls and stable 53.26190°N 0.78319°W		17th century	The house, which was refronted in the 18th century, is in painted render on red brick, with a stone plinth, a floor band, an eaves cornice, and a hipped slate roof. There are two storeys, five bays, and a lower rear wing. Three steps lead up to a central doorway with fluted Doric pilasters, an entablature with paterae, a fanlight, and a pediment, and the windows are sashes. To the right, and recessed, is a single-storey two-bay stable in red brick with a pantile roof. Projecting from the left of this is a lean-to, and to the right is a range of outbuildings with a single storey and four bays. In front of the house is a red brick wall with a stone base and moulded brick coping, and there are other walls.	II
Manor Farmhouse; 53.26446°N 0.78779°W		Mid 17th century	The oldest part of the farmhouse is the rear wing, with the main block dating from the early 19th century. It is in colourwashed plaster on brick, on a plinth, with an eaves cornice, and a pantile roof, hipped on the left. There are two storeys and five bays, a lean-to on the left, and a rear wing. In the centre is an open Roman Doric porch and a doorway with a fanlight, and the windows are sashes.	II
Marples' Cottages; 53.25946°N 0.78073°W		Early 18th century	A pair of cottages in red brick with pantile roofs and two storeys. The right cottage is higher, with two bays, a floor band, a dentilled eaves band, and rendered raised gables with kneelers. Between the cottages is a passageway, and the left cottage has three bays and an eaves band. Both cottages have a doorway and horizontally-sliding sash windows.	II
Group of three headstones 53.26105°N 0.77944°W		1729	The group of headstones in the churchyard of St Oswald's Church is to the south of the chancel. The headstones are dated 1729, 1731 and 1738, and each consists of a rectangular stone slab with an arched head, containing an inscription and decoration.	II
Bridge Inn; 53.26128°N 0.78087°W		Late 18th century	The public house is in painted brick, with corner pilasters, a dentilled and dogtooth eaves band, and a pantile roof. There are two storeys and attics, four bays, and a lean-to rear extension. On the front is a projecting porch with an open pediment, pilasters, and a sash window with a segmental head. The doorway on its left side has a fluted surround. The windows in the ground floor are sashes, and above they are casements.	II
West End Farmhouse and stable block 53.26235°N 0.78427°W		Late 18th century	The farmhouse, which was extended and refaced in the 19th century, is rendered, on a plinth, and has corner pilasters, a floor band, dentilled eaves, and a pantile roof with a coped gable and kneelers at the rear left. There are two storeys and two bays, and sash windows. At the rear, a single-storey three-bay wing leads to the red brick single-storey stable ranges. These contain doorways with segmental arches and other openings.	II
Wilmot House; 53.26106°N 0.78086°W		Late 18th century	The house is in rendered brick on a stone base, with a floor band, dogtooth eaves, and a tile roof with raised and rendered gables and kneelers. There are two storeys, a front range of four bays, and a three-bay rear wing, beyond which is a single-bay outbuilding. The doorway has a four-light fanlight and an arched hood on attached columns, and the windows are casements with segmental heads.	II
Gateway to churchyard (north); 53.26129°N 0.77984°W		Mid 19th century	At the northern entrance to the churchyard of St Oswald's Church is a gateway flanked by engaged stone columns with moulded capitals. Between them is a stone overthrow with a hood mould and a cross, and flanking the gateway are small sloping stone walls.	II
Gateway to churchyard (west); 53.26108°N 0.77998°W		Mid 19th century	At the western entrance to the churchyard of St Oswald's Church is a gateway flanked by engaged stone columns with foliate capitals. Between them are iron gates, and a stone overthrow with a hood mould and a cross. Flanking the gateway are stone walls on plinths, extending for 1.5 metres (4 ft 11 in).	II
War memorial 53.26117°N 0.78133°W		1921	The war memorial, which stands in an enclosure by a road junction, is in Aberdeen granite. It consists of a Latin cross on a plinth, on a base of three steps. The cross head is carved with laurel leaves and a cap with ammunition pouches. On the plinth are grey slate tablets with inscriptions and the names of those lost in the two World Wars.	II
