= Dunham-on-Trent =

Village and civil parish in Nottinghamshire, England

Coordinates: 53.26°N 0.78°W

- Village and civil parish
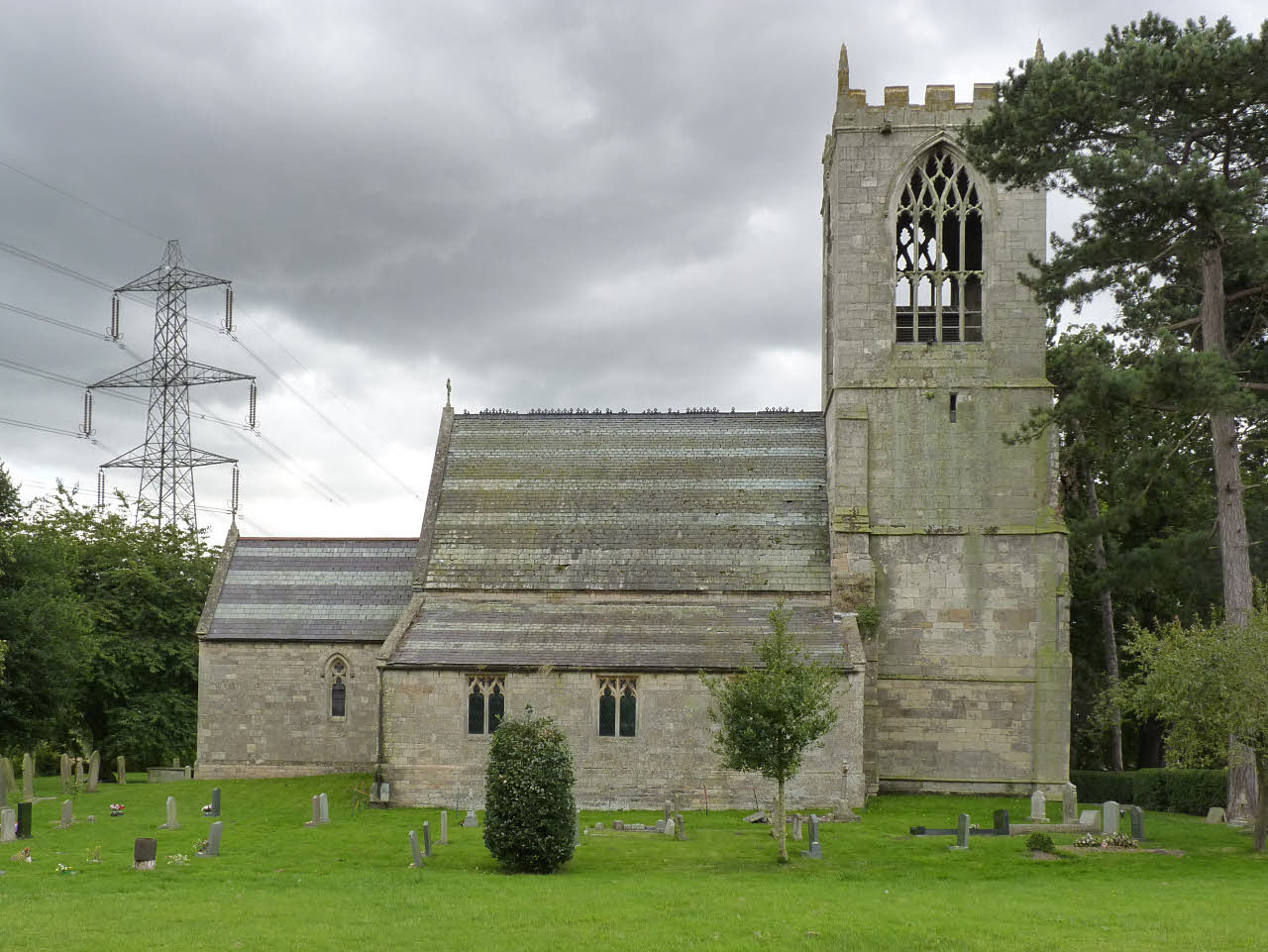
- St Oswalds Church

- Location within Nottinghamshire
- Interactive map of Dunham-on-Trent
- Area: 1.71 sq mi (4.4 km^{2})
- Population: 361 (2021)
  - Density: 211/sq mi (81/km^{2})
- OS grid reference: SK813744
  - London: 120 mi (190 km) SE
- District: Bassetlaw
- Shire county: Nottinghamshire
- Region: East Midlands
- Country: England
- Sovereign state: United Kingdom
- Post town: NEWARK
- Postcode district: NG22
- Dialling code: 01777
- Police: Nottinghamshire
- Fire: Nottinghamshire
- Ambulance: East Midlands
- UK Parliament: Newark
- Website: Dunham and District Parish Council

Dunham-on-Trent is a village and civil parish in Nottinghamshire, England. It is located on the A57 road, about 0.5 miles (0.8 km) west of Dunham Bridge, a toll bridge crossing the River Trent.

According to the 2001 census it had a population of 351, falling slightly to 343 at the 2011 census, and increasing to 361 in 2021.

The earliest part of the Grade I listed parish church of St Oswald is the tower, dating from the 15th century and Perpendicular in style. The rest is mostly Victorian, built 1861–62 by T.C. Hine, father of George Thomas Hine, though the south nave wall remains from an earlier reconstruction completed in 1802.

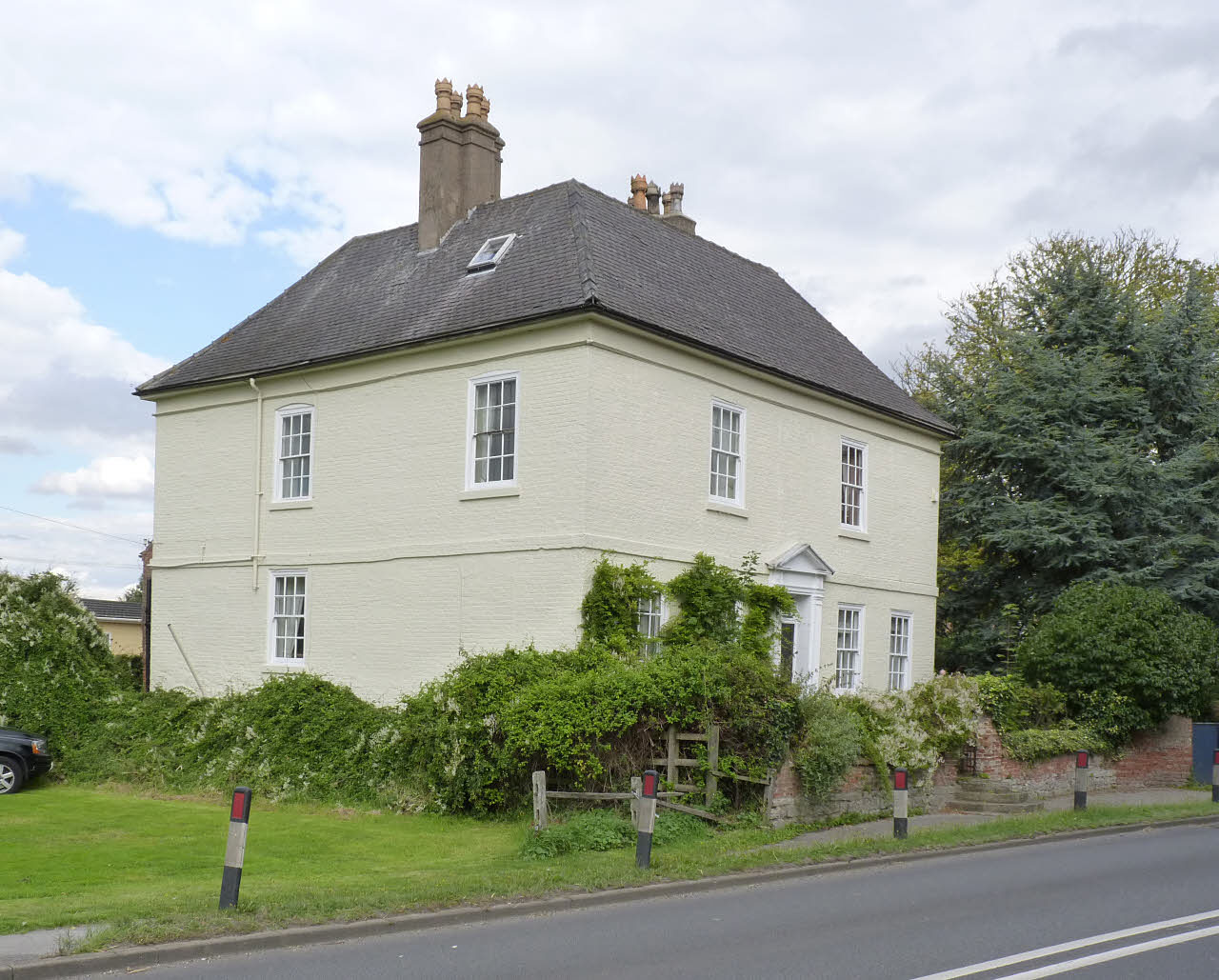
Dunham House formally St Oswalds House

The site of Whimpton Village, a deserted medieval village, is about 1.25 miles (2.0 km) west of Dunham.

== Notable people ==
The pro-EU campaigner Anna Soubry grew up in Dunham-on-Trent and Clumber Park.

== See also ==
- Listed buildings in Dunham-on-Trent
