= St Paul's Church, Hasland =

St Paul’s Church, Hasland
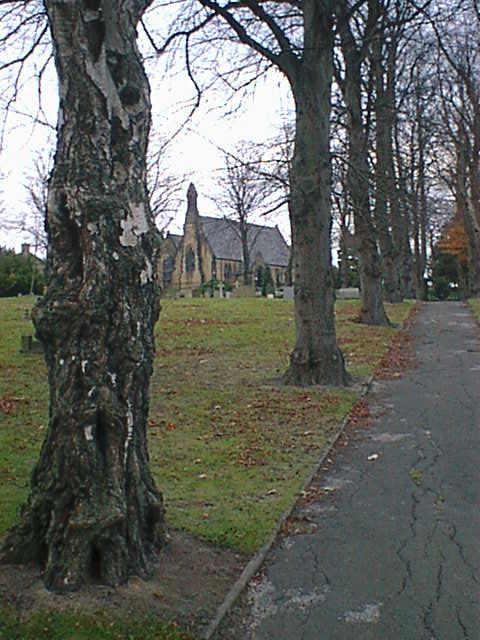
- St Paul’s Church, Hasland
- St Paul’s Church, Hasland
- 53°12′45″N 1°24′24″W
- OS grid reference: SK 39716 68556
- Location: Hasland, Derbyshire
- Country: England
- Denomination: Church of England

History
- Dedication: St Paul

Architecture
- Heritage designation: Grade II listed
- Architect: Thomas Chambers Hine
- Completed: 24 September 1850

Administration
- Province: Canterbury
- Diocese: Derby
- Archdeaconry: Chesterfield
- Deanery: Chesterfield
- Parish: Hasland

St Paul's Church, Hasland is a Grade II listed parish church in the Church of England in Hasland, Derbyshire.

== History ==
The church was built by the contractor Rollinson and Heath of Chesterfield in 1850 to the designs of the architect Thomas Chambers Hine. It opened on 24 September 1850. The church was enlarged in 1867 by Samuel Rollinson with the addition of a new aisle and re-opened on 3 October 1867.

== Organ ==
The organ was installed in 1983. It was originally built in 1842 by J.C. Bishop and installed in the Church of the Holy Name, Grassmoor, and later in St James the Apostle's Church, Normanton. A specification of the organ can be found on the National Pipe Organ Register.
