= Farnsfield =

Village in Nottinghamshire, England

Coordinates: 53°06′10″N 1°02′10″W

- Village and civil parish
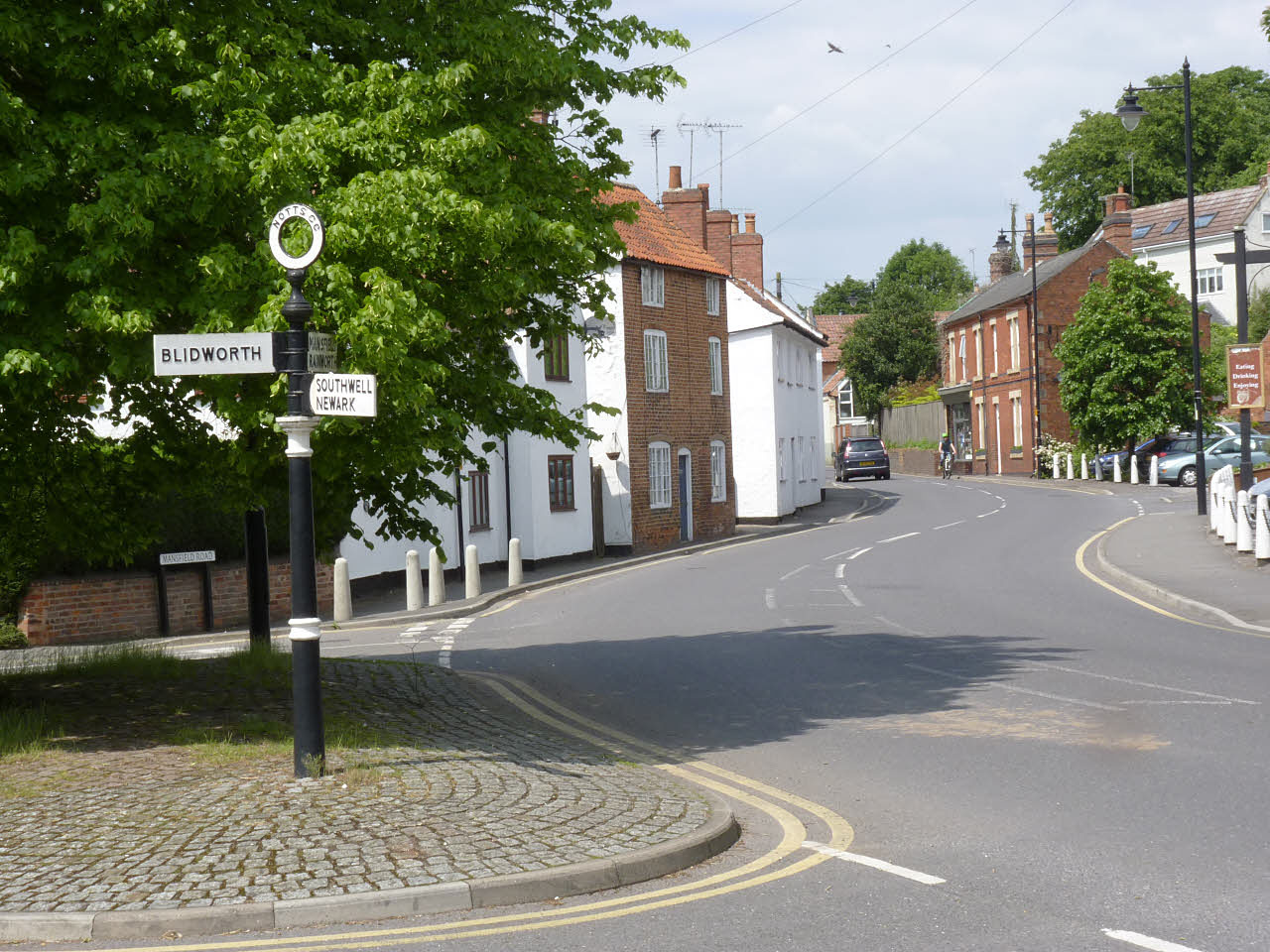
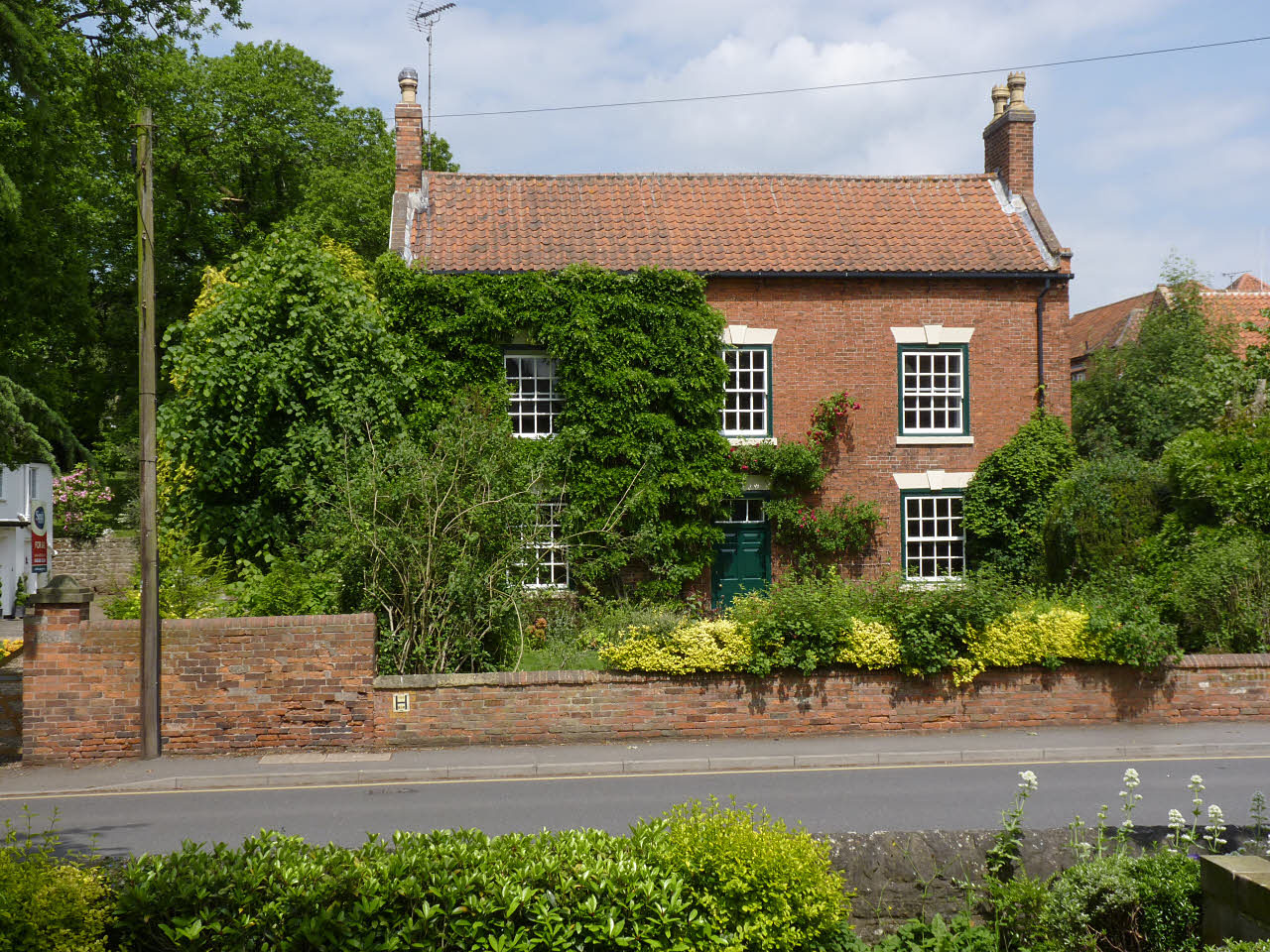
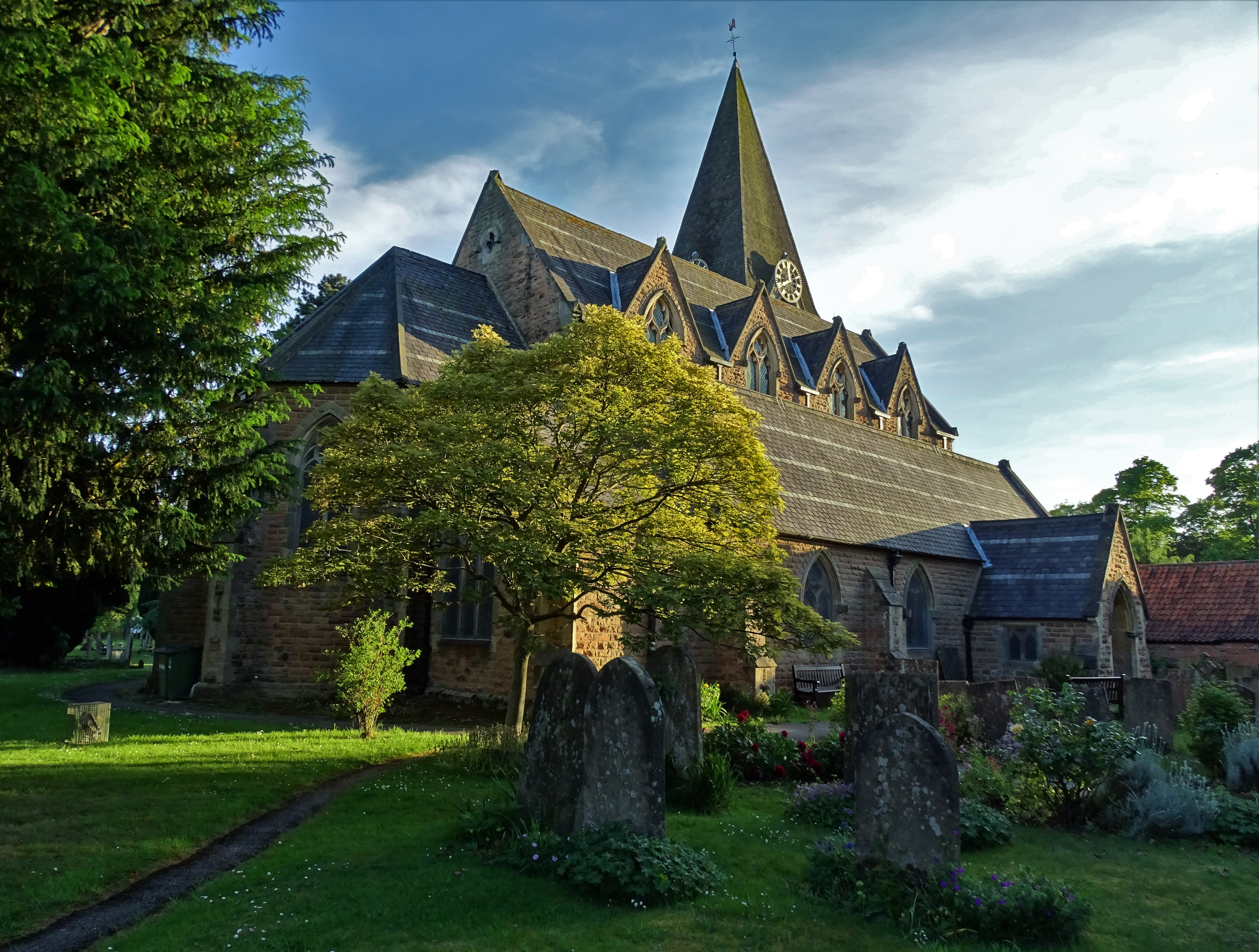
- Mansfield Road Church Farmhouse St Michael's Church

- Location within Nottinghamshire
- Interactive map of Farnsfield
- Area: 7.37 sq mi (19.1 km^{2})
- Population: 3,216 (2021)
  - Density: 436/sq mi (168/km^{2})
- OS grid reference: SK 64675 56573
  - London: 115 mi (185 km) SSE
- District: Newark and Sherwood
- Shire county: Nottinghamshire
- Region: East Midlands
- Country: England
- Sovereign state: United Kingdom
- Post town: Newark
- Postcode district: NG22
- Dialling code: (01623) 88
- Police: Nottinghamshire
- Fire: Nottinghamshire
- Ambulance: East Midlands
- UK Parliament: Sherwood
- Website: www.farnsfieldparishcouncil.co.uk

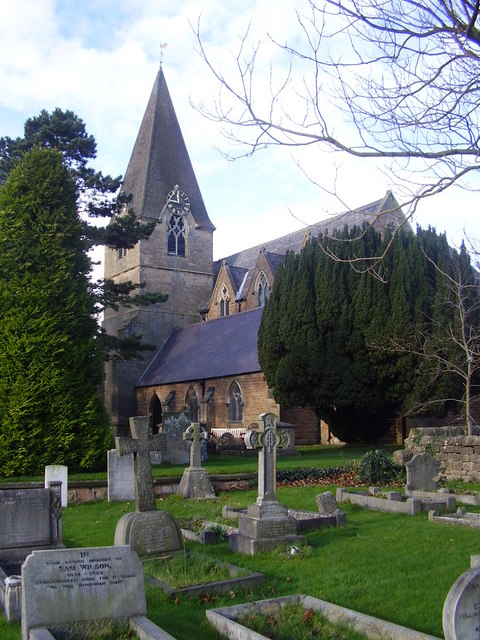
St Michael’s Church, Farnsfield

Farnsfield is a large village and civil parish in Nottinghamshire in Sherwood Forest. It is in the local government district of Newark and Sherwood. The population of the civil parish as at the United Kingdom Census 2001 was 2,681, increasing in the 2011 census to 2,731, and 3,216 at the 2021 census.

The village lies in a predominantly farming area. There is no major industry or employer within Farnsfield. The majority of residents of working age commute to work, mostly to Nottingham, Mansfield or Newark.

Farnsfield's facilities include a small Co-op supermarket and Post Office, a village bakery, butcher, greengrocer, and other small shops. The village has two churches (Anglican and Methodist), a large primary school, and two public houses (The Plough Inn and The Lion).

The Southwell Trail, a former railway line dating to 1842 and now adapted as a multi-user route for foot, cycle and horseback use, passes immediately to the north of the village. A free car park for the trail is located off Station Lane.

In 1944, during World War II, an RAF Halifax bomber MZ519-LKU crashed on the south side of the village. All on board were killed. The site of the crash has a large memorial.

== Location ==
Farnsfield lies in central Nottinghamshire, approximately 16 miles (26 km) north-east of Nottingham, 9.8 miles (15.8 km) east of Mansfield and 6.8 miles (10.9 km) north-west of Southwell. The main area of the village itself is approximately mile to the east of the main A614 road linking Nottingham to Doncaster.

== History ==
The parish church of St Michael dates from the 15th century, before the Reformation. It was rebuilt by Thomas Chambers Hine and Robert Evans in 1859 to 1860. Only a fragment of the tower from the 15th-century building survives. The parish is in the Diocese of Southwell and Nottingham.

The area has evidence at several sites of ancient Roman and earlier occupation. To the south of the village, along the footpath to Oxton, are the remains of a small Roman marching camp, marked by a small Roman fort. There are no standing remains in the fields, but outlines of the buildings are clearly visible on aerial photos, including the satellite view on Google Maps. One mile south-west of the village is a small oval earthwork. The remains of a hillfort at Combs Farm is encircled by a bank and ditch. From excavated material, this fort appears to have been Romano-British in origin. Two ditches in a wood at Camp Hill, 1½ miles north-east of Farnsfield, are the remaining traces of an Iron Age earthwork, a hillfort. In the 18th century, researchers estimated it to have been 40 acres (16 ha) in area. The Roman camp and the ancient hillfort at Combs Farm are both protected Scheduled Monuments.

There was a tower windmill on Siding Lane (grid reference SK644572) shown on a map of 1898 as an 'old windmill'. It was recorded as a shell in August 1935, with the cap and fantail gone. The mill was owned at some time by a miller named Whitehead, who also milled at Edingley Watermill. When in use, it was powered by a gas engine.

The Good Intent Windmill (grid reference SK639571) was a tower mill, built c. 1820 for Holliday, a resident of Farnsfield. Material for building the mill was carted from Fiskerton. The tower was 6 storeys, brick-built and untarred, with 4 sweeps driving 3 pairs of stones (1 French and 2 grey). The mill was worked by William Shaw, who was succeeded by his son Alec c. 1893. The mill was sold to George Hutchinson, who worked it for short periods until the machinery was dismantled and the tower demolished about 1915.

A post windmill was recorded near the Junction Inn, owned by Bower.

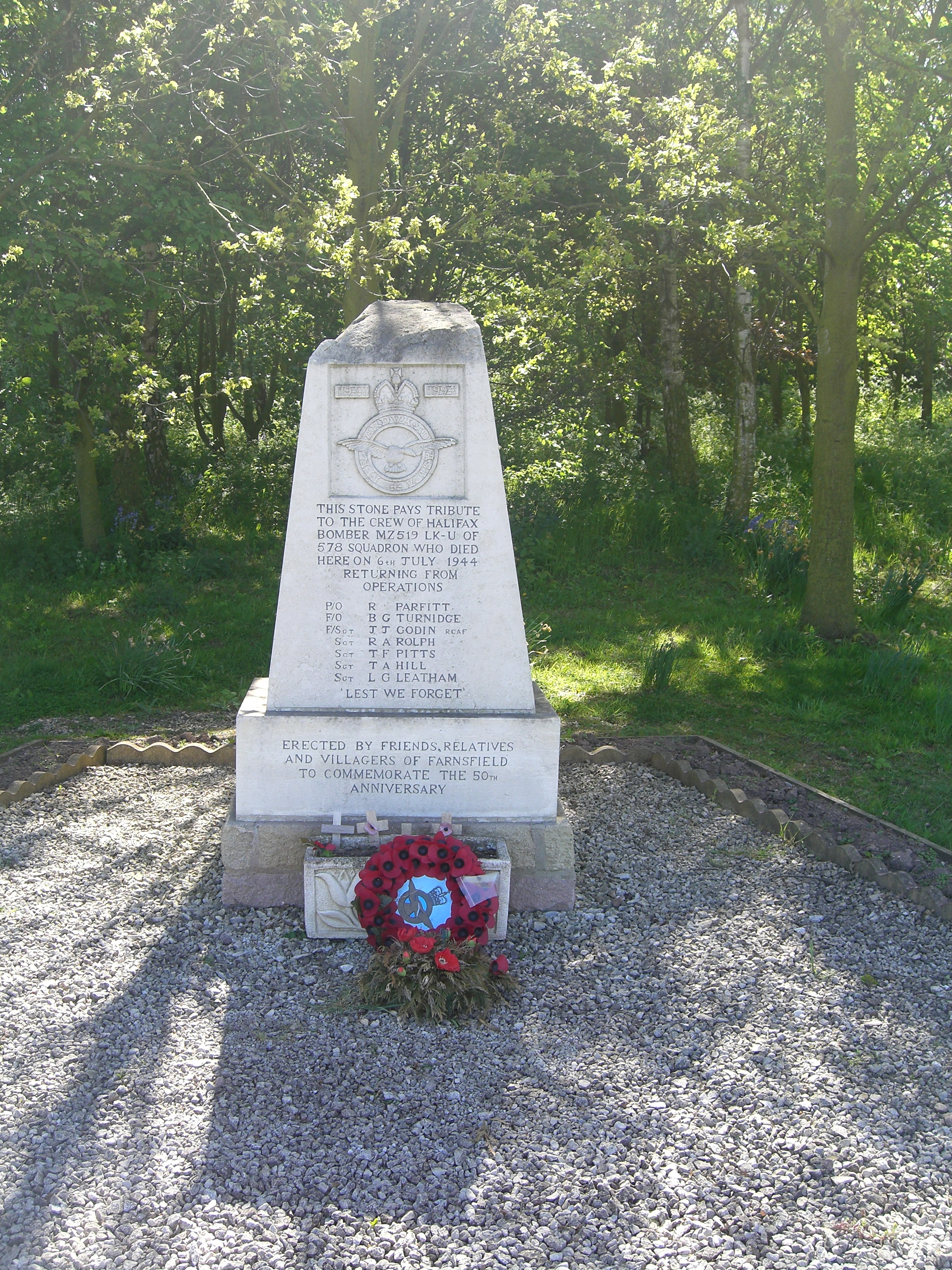
Halifax Bomber Memorial

On 6 July 1944 an RAF Halifax bomber MZ519-LKU crashed on the south side of the village on its return to RAF Burn near York. The Halifax had been on a mission to destroy a V1 flying bomb site in Nazi-occupied France. All of the Canadian and British crewmen on board were killed. A large memorial was erected at the crash site. A copse of English oaks and Canadian maples was planted and dedicated to the crewmen.

A History of Farnsfield was published in 2000 by the Farnsfield Millennium Trust. They also compiled an oral history based on recordings of local people and related transcripts; copies of these were given to the local schools. A copy available in the library is illustrated by local artist Barbara Coulam.

The Lady Goodwin Play Park on Station Lane is named after Lady Florence Goodwin, the wife of philanthropist Sir Stuart Goodwin: he was High Sheriff of Nottinghamshire in 1955.

== Notable people ==
Both Sir Augustus Charles Gregory and his brother, Francis Gregory, Australian explorers and politicians, were born in Farnsfield. Their family emigrated to Australia in 1829, where they made their careers.

== International relations ==
Farnsfield is twinned with the village of Andouillé in north-western France.

== See also ==
- Listed buildings in Farnsfield
- Aviation accidents and incidents
- List of closed railway stations in Britain: D-F
