= St Michael's Church, Farnsfield =

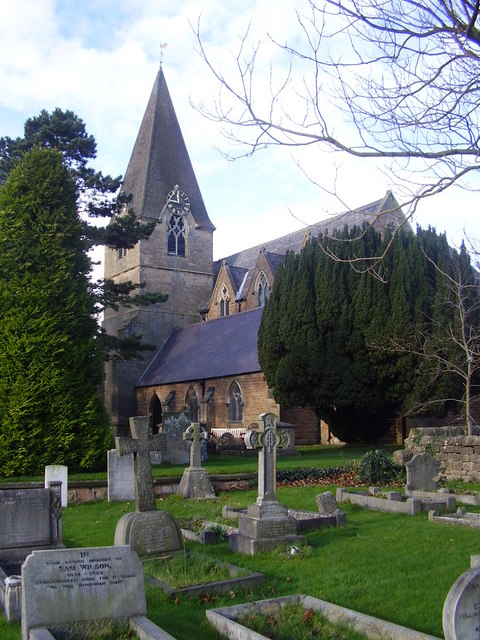
- St Michael's Church, Farnsfield
- St Michael's Church, Farnsfield
- 53°6′7.11″N 1°2′10.69″W
- OS grid reference: SK 64609 56540
- Location: Farnsfield
- Country: England
- Denomination: Church of England

History
- Dedication: St Michael the Archangel

Architecture
- Heritage designation: Grade II listed
- Architect(s): Thomas Chambers Hine and William Evans
- Groundbreaking: 1859
- Completed: 1860

Administration
- Diocese: Diocese of Southwell and Nottingham
- Archdeaconry: Newark
- Deanery: Newark and Southwell
- Parish: Farnsfield

St Michael's Church, Farnsfield is a Grade II listed parish church in the Church of England in Farnsfield.

== History ==
The church dates from the 15th century but was rebuilt between 1859 and 1860 by Thomas Chambers Hine and Robert Evans following a fire. Only a fragment of the tower from the 15th-century building survives.

== Organ ==
The organ is by James Jepson Binns. A specification of the organ can be found on the National Pipe Organ Register.

== See also ==
- Listed buildings in Farnsfield
