= Thomas Chambers Hine =

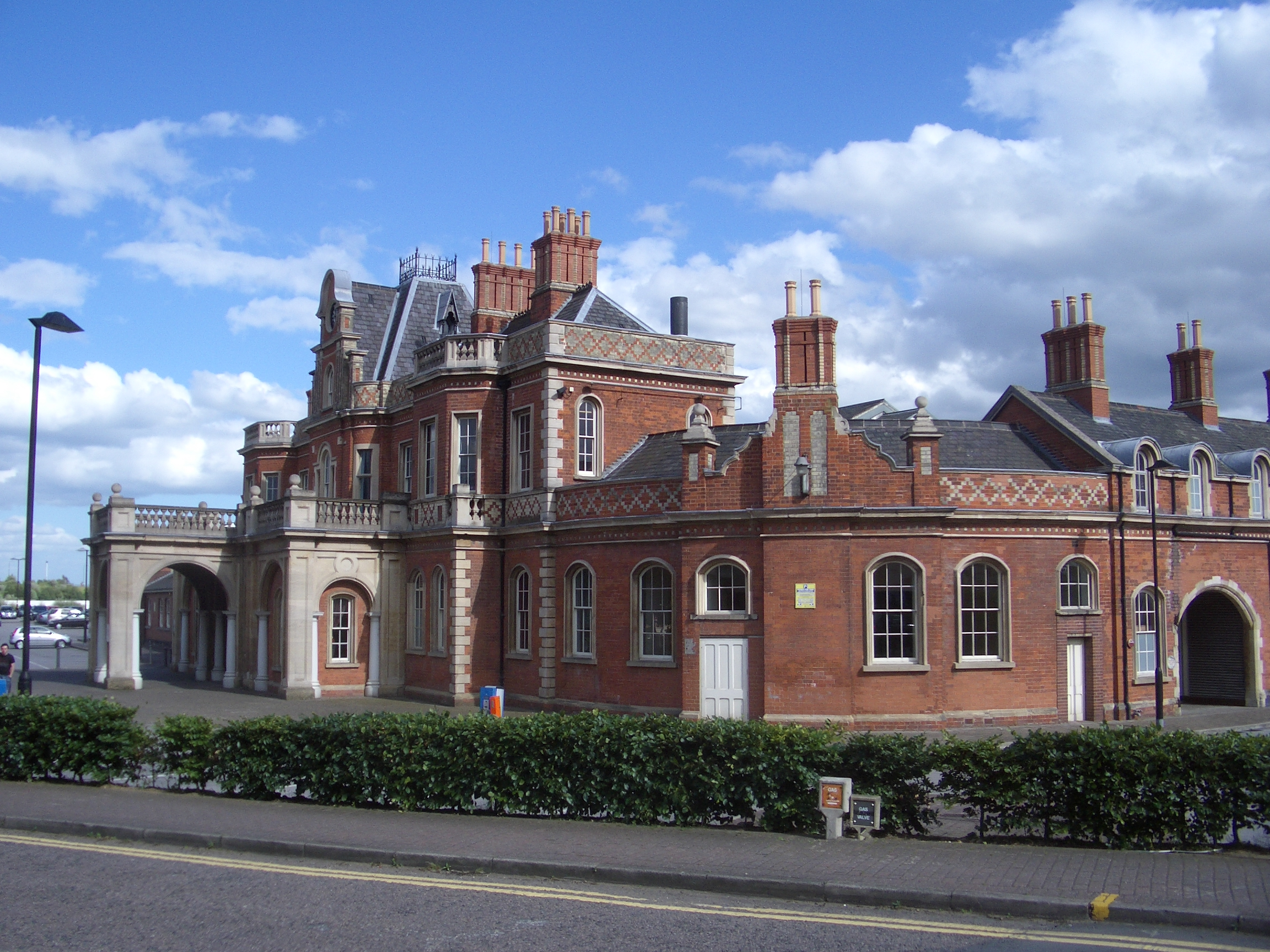
- Nottingham Great Northern Railway station
- Born: 31 May 1813; St Michael, London
- Died: 6 February 1899 (aged 85); 25 Regent Street, Nottingham
- Occupation: Architect
- Practice: Associated architectural firm[s]
- Projects: The Park Estate

Thomas Chambers Hine (31 May 1813 – 6 February 1899) was an architect based in Nottingham.

== Background ==
He was born in Covent Garden into a prosperous middle-class family, the eldest son of Jonathan Hine (1780–1862), a hosiery manufacturer and Melicent Chambers (1778–1845). He was articled to the London architect Matthew Habershon until 1834.

In 1837 he arrived in Nottingham and formed a partnership with the builder William Patterson. This business relationship was dissolved in 1849. He worked from 1857 with Robert Evans JP until early in 1867 and thereafter with his son George Thomas Hine until his retirement around 1890.

He was nominated as a Fellow of the Royal Institute of British Architects in 1878, but this appears to have been voided.

== Personal life ==
He married Mary Betts (1813–1893) in 1837 and together had seven children surviving to adulthood. Their eldest child, Mary Melicent Hine (1838–1928) became a nurse and founded the Nottingham Children's Hospital on Postern Street in Nottingham.

== Buildings ==
1840s

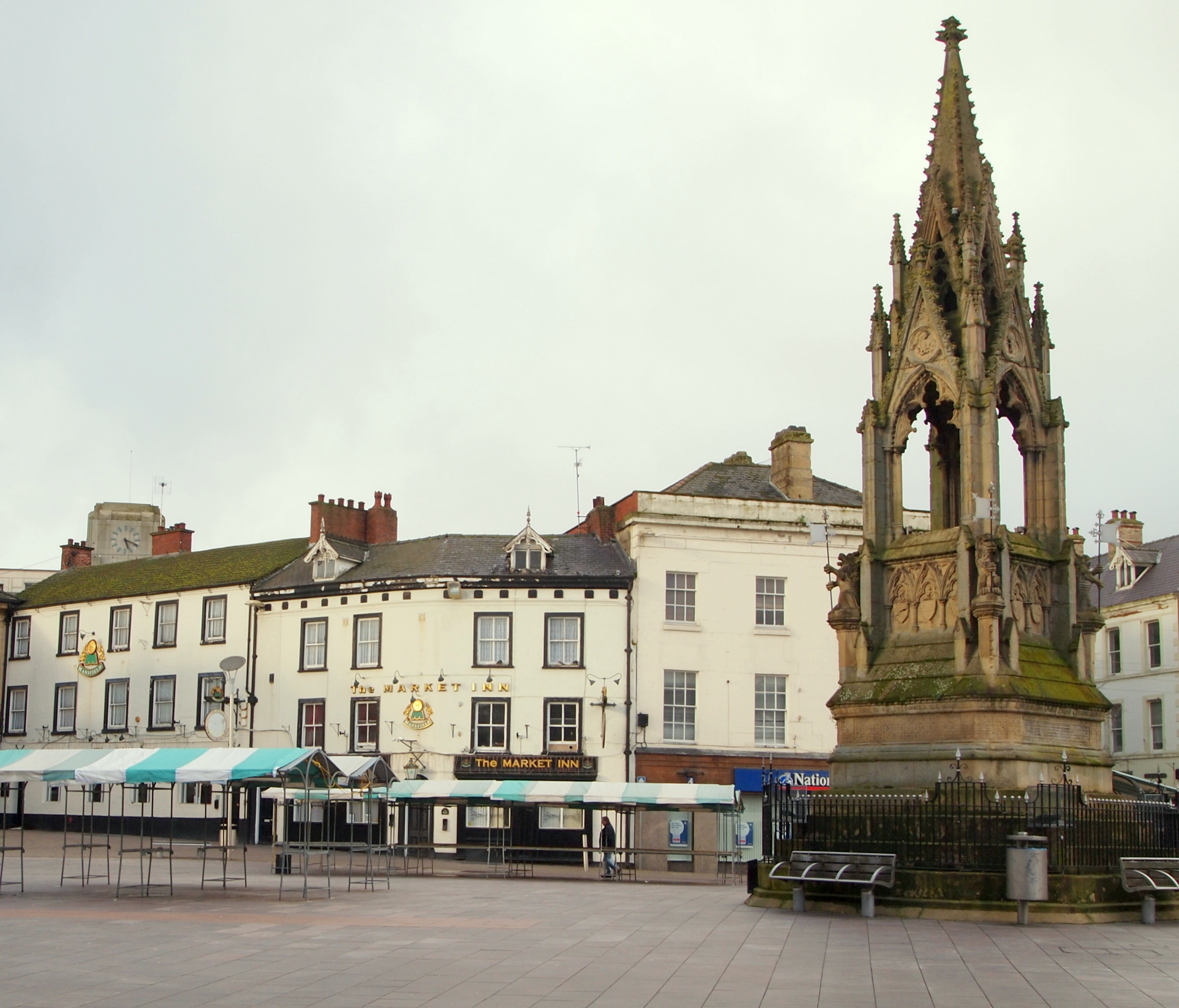
Monument to Lord George Frederick Cavendish Bentinck, Market Place, Mansfield 1849

- St Laurence's Church, Gonalston rebuilding 1843
- Holy Trinity Church, Shirebrook 1843-44
- Monument to Lord George Frederick Cavendish Bentinck, Market Place, Mansfield, Nottinghamshire 1849
- Rectory Kinoulton, Nottinghamshire, 1849
- Rectory Maplebeck, Nottinghamshire, 1849

1850s

- Nottingham Corn Exchange, Thurland Street, Nottingham 1849–50
- Holy Cross Church, Morton Derbyshire 1850
- St Paul's Church, Hasland Derbyshire 1850
- Rectory at St Paul's Church, Hasland Derbyshire 1850
- 5, 7, 9, 11, 21, 23, Park Valley, The Park, Nottingham 1844-51
- 1–11 and 25 Regent Street, Nottingham 1851
- Hine and Mundella, Station Street, Nottingham 1851
- 1 Clifton Terrace, The Park, Nottingham 1851
- Gonalston Hall, Nottinghamshire, remodelling 1851–52
- South Manor for Sir Thomas Parkyns, Ruddington, Nottinghamshire 1852
- Priory Church of St. Peter, Thurgarton, Nottinghamshire, restoration 1852–53
- Bluecoat School, Mansfield Road, Nottingham 1852-53
- Flintham Hall Nottinghamshire, remodelling and two lodges 1853
- St Laurence's Church, Gonalston, Nottinghamshire, rebuilt 1853
- The Park Estate, Nottingham 1854 onwards
- Stanford House, Castle Gate, Nottingham 1854
- Hosiery Warehouse (Topshop in 2016), corner of Low Pavement and Lister Gate, Nottingham 1854
- Nottingham General Hospital addition of third storey and chapel 1854–55
- The Park Tunnel, Nottingham 1855
- Lace Warehouses for Richard Birkin, Broadway, Nottingham 1855
- Lace Warehouse for Thomas Adams, Stoney Street, Nottingham 1855
- St Giles' Church, Darlton, Nottinghamshire, restoration 1855
- St. George's Church, Barton in Fabis, Nottinghamshire, restoration 1855
- Elton and Orston railway station, Great Northern Railway, Nottinghamshire 1855
- Christ Church, Cinderhill, Nottingham 1856
- Warehouse, 16 Pilcher Gate, Nottingham 1856
- 1, 3, 5, 7, 9, 11, 13, 29, 31, 33 Newcastle Drive, The Park, Nottingham 1856-59
- Radcliffe railway station, Great Northern Railway, Nottinghamshire 1857?
- Aslockton railway station, Great Northern Railway, Nottinghamshire 1857
- Bingham railway station, Great Northern Railway, Nottinghamshire 1857
- Nottingham Great Northern railway station, 1857
- Corn Warehouse, Great Northern Railway, London Road, Nottingham 1857
- All Saints Church, Broxholme, Lincolnshire, 1857
- 1–6 Castle Grove, The Park, Nottingham 1856-58
- Coppice Hospital, Ransom Road, Mapperley, Nottingham 1857–59
- William House, 1 South Road, The Park, Nottingham 1859

1860s

- St Michael's Church, Farnsfield, Nottinghamshire, rebuilding 1859–60
- St Michael the Archangel's Church, Laxton, Nottinghamshire, restoration 1859–60
- School, Farnsfield, Nottinghamshire, 1859–60
- 10–12 Plumptre Street, Nottingham 1861
- 13–33 Lenton Road, The Park, Nottingham 1858–62
- St Oswald's Church, Dunham-on-Trent, Nottinghamshire, and vicarage 1861–62
- St. Luke's Church, Shireoaks, Nottinghamshire 1861–62
- Lenton Firs, Derby Road, University of Nottingham 1862 (remodelled)
- Cranfield Court, Bedfordshire, 1862–64
- HM Prison Foston Hall, 1863
- All Saints' Church, Nottingham, 1863–64
- Meadows Mill, Queen's Road, Nottingham 1865
- Nottingham High School, Arboretum Street, Nottingham, with Thomas Simpson, 1866–67
- St. Peter's Church, Aisthorpe, Lincolnshire, 1867
- St. Matthias Church, St. Matthias Street, Sneinton, Nottingham 1867–69
- Old Rectory, Beelsby, Lincolnshire, 1868
- St. Stephen's Church, Bunker's Hill enlargement 1868

1870s

- Convent of the Sisters of St. Joseph, Mapperley Road, Mapperley, Nottingham 1870
- Simla Villa, 73 Raleigh Street, Nottingham 1870
- St. Michael's Church, Coningsby, Lincolnshire, restoration 1870
- St. Giles Church, West Bridgford, Nottinghamshire, restoration 1872
- Claremont, 7 North Road, The Park, Nottingham 1872
- Vicarage, Beckingham, Nottinghamshire, 1873
- St. Margaret's Church, Bilsthorpe, restoration and addition of Savile transeptal chapel 1873
- Vicarage, Edwinstowe, Nottinghamshire, alterations 1874
- Linden House, Newcastle Circus, The Park, Nottingham 1875
- 6 Maxtoke Road, The Park, Nottingham 1875
- Nottingham Castle Museum of Fine Art, 1875-78
- All Hallows Church, Ordsall, Nottinghamshire, restoration 1876
- 1 Cavendish Crescent South, The Park, Nottingham 1877
- Mevell House, 7 Newcastle Circus, The Park, Nottingham 1877
- Shire Hall, High Pavement, Nottingham, extensions and alterations 1876–79
- Penrhyn House, Tunnel Road, The Park, Nottingham 1879

1880s

- St. Edmund's Church, Holme Pierrepont, Nottinghamshire, alterations 1878–81
- 18-20 Park Terrace, The Park, Nottingham 1881
- Cavendish House, Cavendish Road East, The Park, Nottingham 1881
- Overdale, Cavendish Road East, The Park, Nottingham 1883
- Elmhurst, Cavendish Road East, The Park, Nottingham 1883
- Cavendish Court, 25 Cavendish Road East, The Park, Nottingham 1884-85
- County Junior School, Lovers Lane, Newark-on-Trent 1889
