= Vale of Belvoir =

Area in the East Midlands, England

Coordinates: 52.92°N 0.86°W

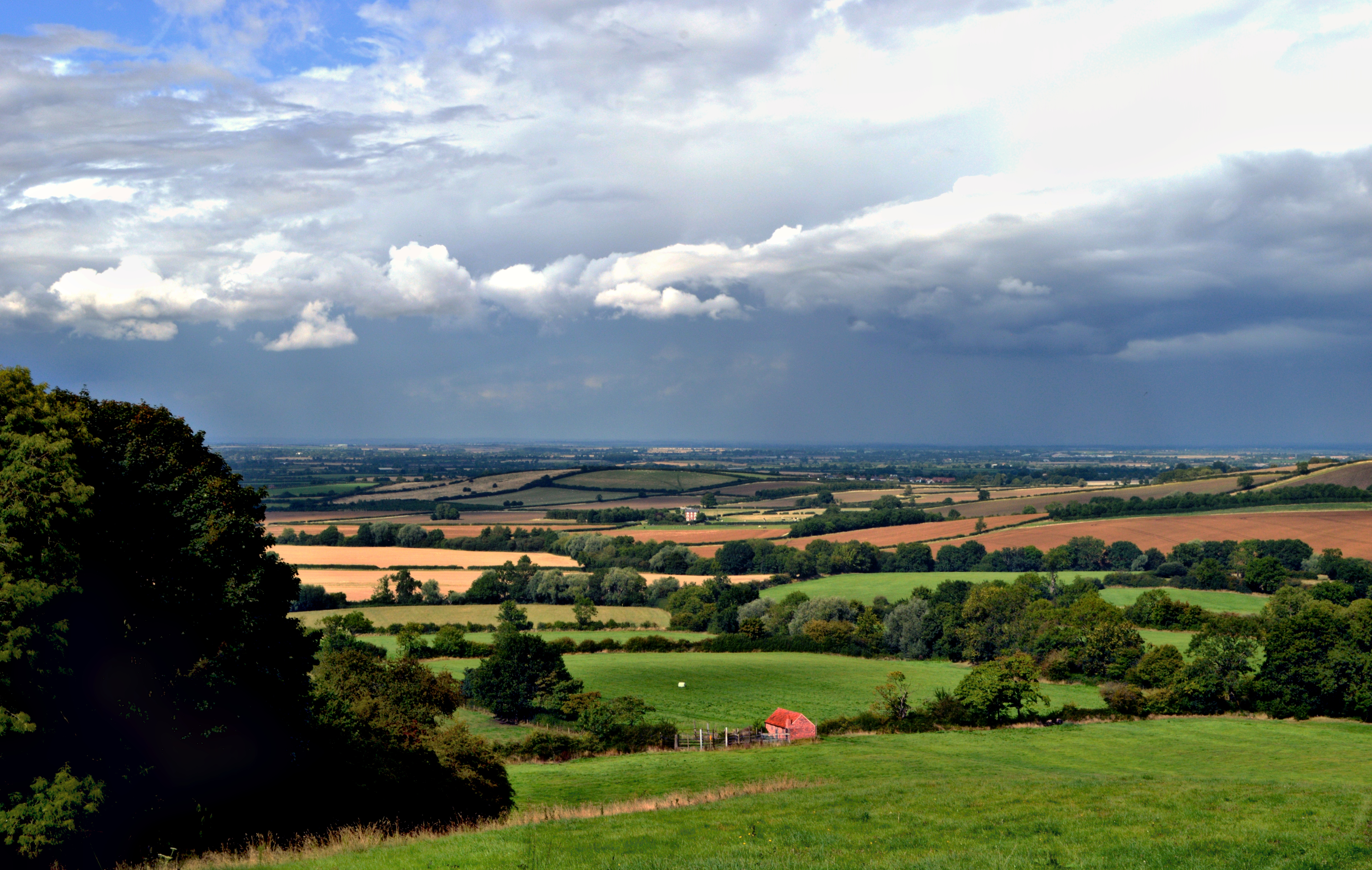
Vale of Belvoir from near Ab Kettleby off the A606

The Vale of Belvoir (/ˈbiːvər/ BEE-vər) is in Leicestershire, Nottinghamshire and Lincolnshire, England. The name is from the Norman-French for "beautiful view".

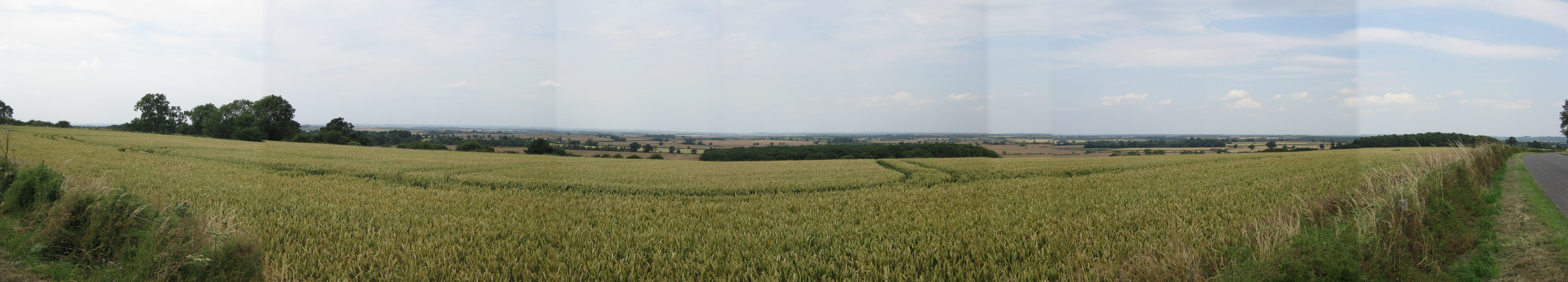
A panorama of the Vale of Belvoir

== Extent and geology ==
The vale is a tract of low ground rising east-north-east, drained by the River Devon and its major tributary the Smite. Its vale-like form can be viewed either from its south-east to eastern flank (the Belvoir "ridge") or from the north-west along the A46 road, (itself the Roman-age Fosse Way), which runs along the watershed between the Devon and the River Trent, from which it is less conspicuous.

The vale is the product of various geological processes. It is occupied in the main by the sedimentary mudstones and thin limestones of the Liassic (Lias), with a northern fringe from the upper parts of the Triassic (Mercia Mudstone and Rhaetic). The south-eastern margin is the most clearly defined because it is formed by a conspicuous scarp slope, on which Belvoir Castle sits about 330 feet (100 m) above the valley floor. Its resistance to erosion is due to a capping of relatively thick Jurassic Ironstone. The vale-like form is further constrained by cappings of ancient glacial till that form the higher ground along its western margin.

In the Pliocene epoch (1.7 million years ago) the Vale of Belvoir was occupied by the "Proto-Trent" River, which cut the Ancaster Gap through the limestone ridge at Ancaster and then flowed on to the North Sea. At the end of the Wolstonian Stage, c. 130,000 years ago, a mass of stagnant ice left in the Vale of Belvoir caused the river to divert north along the old Lincoln river, through the Lincoln Gap.

== Settlements ==
Settlements in Nottinghamshire include Alverton, Aslockton, Barnstone, Bingham, Car Colston, Colston Bassett, Cropwell Bishop, Cropwell Butler, Elton on the Hill, Flawborough, Flintham, Granby, Hawksworth, Hickling, Kilvington, Kinoulton, Langar, Orston, Owthorpe, Scarrington, Screveton, Shelton, Sibthorpe, Staunton in the Vale, Sutton, Syerston, Thoroton, Tithby Upper Broughton and Whatton-in-the-Vale.

Settlements in Leicestershire include Barkestone-le-Vale, Belvoir, Leicestershire, Bottesford, Chadwell, Croxton Kerrial, Eaton, Goadby Marwood, Harby, Harston, Hose, Knipton, Long Clawson, Muston, Nether Broughton, Normanton, Old Dalby, Plungar, Redmile, Scalford, Stathern, Waltham on the Wolds and Wycomb.

Settlements in Lincolnshire include Allington, Branston, Denton, Foston, Harlaxton, Sedgebrook and Woolsthorpe by Belvoir.

The relatively populous places in or beside the Vale of Belvoir include Bingham, Cotgrave, Keyworth and Bottesford.

== Features ==
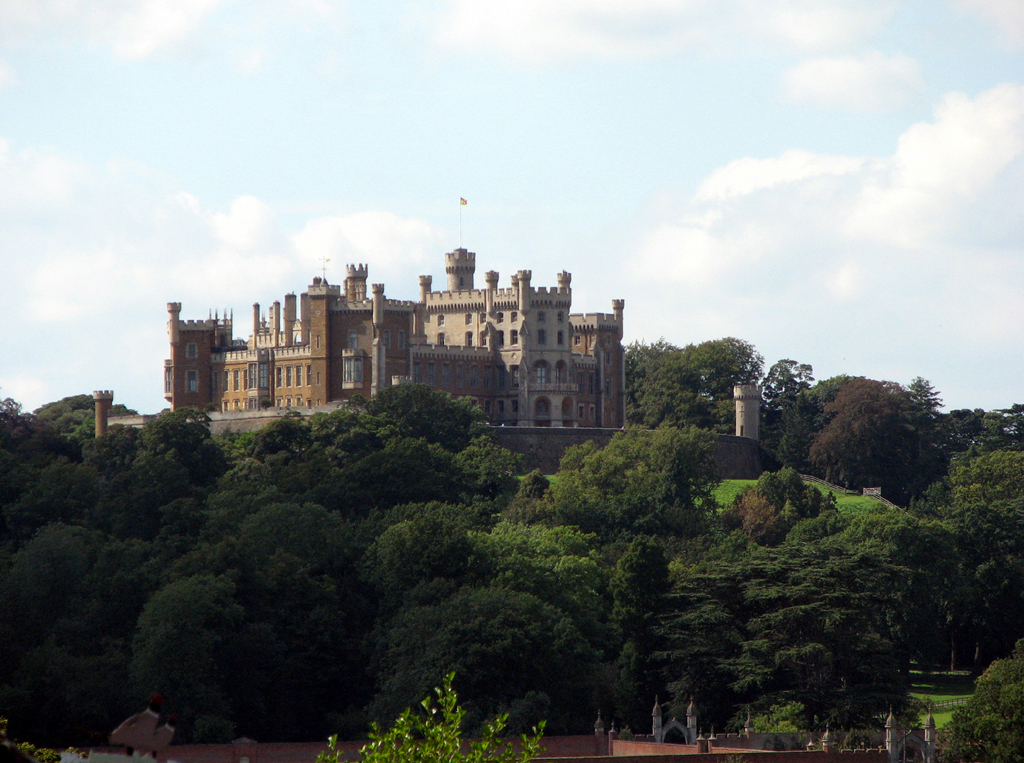
View of Belvoir Castle (from Woolsthorpe by Belvoir)

Belvoir Castle, which occupies a dominant position overlooking the vale, is the ancestral home of the family of the Dukes of Rutland. The castle saw significant damage in both the Wars of the Roses and the English Civil War and has consequently been rebuilt a number of times in its history. It is now open to the public, whilst still remaining a family home.

"Belvoir Angels" are a type of 18th-century Swithland slate tombstone found in the district.

A comprehensive account of the natural history of the vale was compiled in 1790 by the poet George Crabbe, who was chaplain to the Duke of Rutland and later concurrent Rector of Muston, Leicestershire, and the adjacent Allington, Lincolnshire. It includes a list of more than 70 beetle species.

== Economy ==
The area is known for both Stilton cheese and Melton Mowbray pork pies, which are covered by European Protected Designation of Origin orders.

Of the six dairies currently allowed to produce Stilton cheese under the terms of its protected origin status, five are located in the vale. Until the end of the 19th century all Stilton cheese was being produced within 20 miles (32 km) of Melton Mowbray. However, the cheese took its name from the Huntingdonshire village of Stilton.

The Melton Mowbray pork pie is produced by traditional methods using uncured pork and hand-formed pastry and served cold.

The vale was renowned fox hunting country and had many historical ties to the sport.

A controversial coalfield development was proposed in the 1970s. It became the subject of a public enquiry in 1979. The requisite planning applications were ultimately quashed by the secretary of state for the environment in 1982.

== Amenities ==
The UK's first community radio station, 103 The Eye, has been broadcasting since 2005 from Melton Mowbray, with additional studios in other parts of the Vale.

== Gallery ==
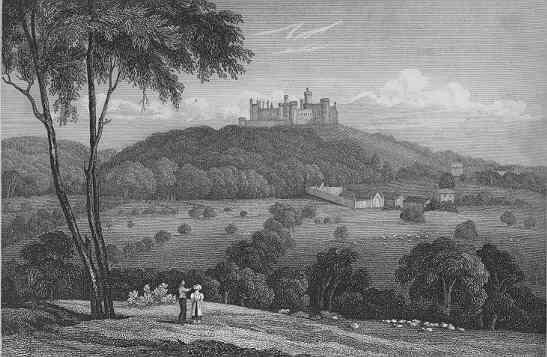
A plate from Jones's Views (1819), showing Belvoir Castle's dominant position overlooking the Vale of Belvoir

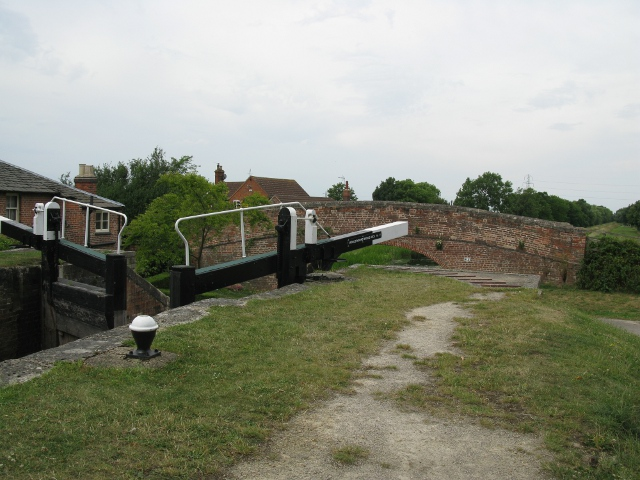
Woolsthorpe locks (on the Grantham Canal). The Rutland Arms public house (Dirty Duck) is in the background.

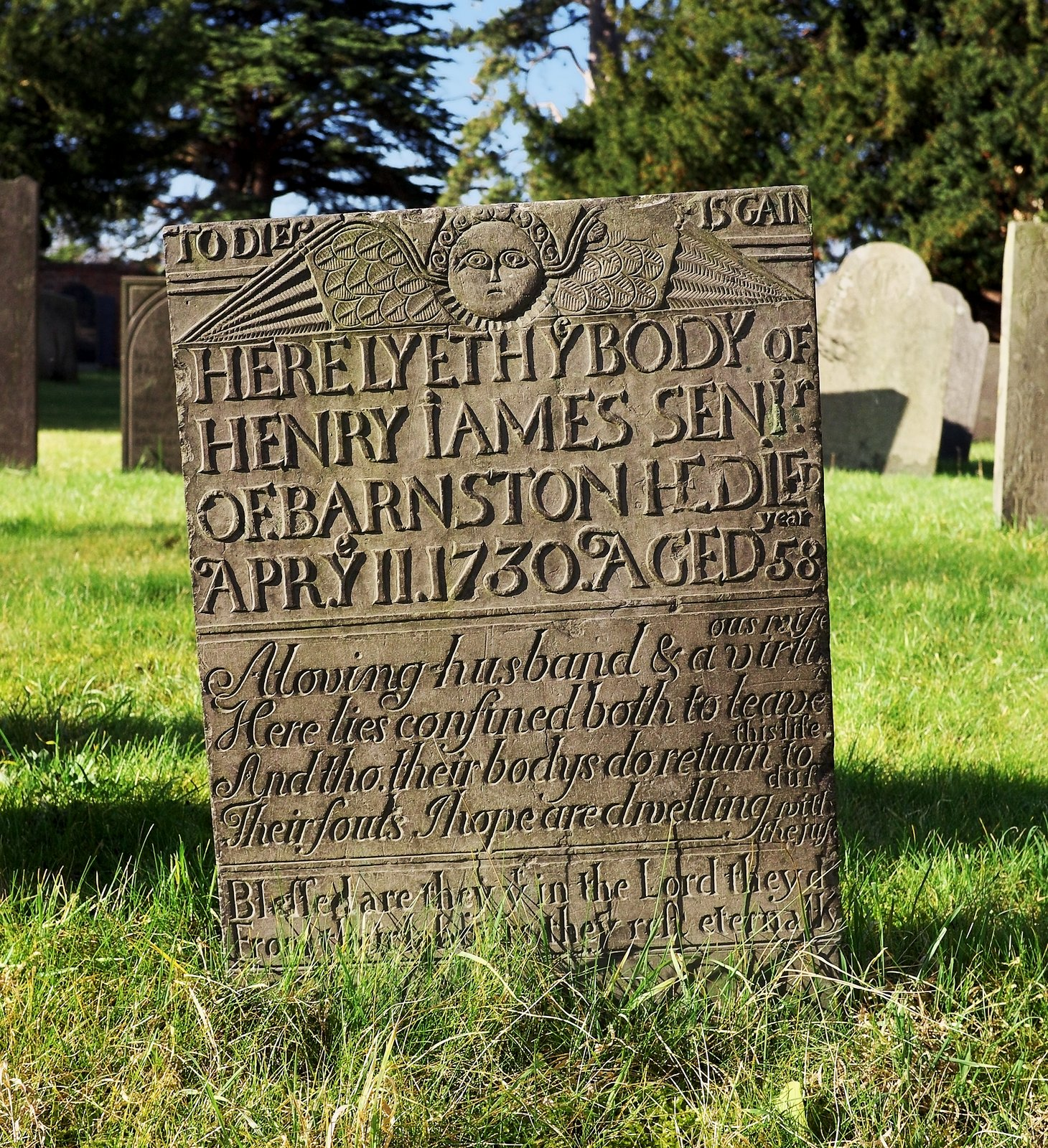
Langar churchyard, Nottinghamshire
