= Bingham Wapentake =

Ancient subdivision of Nottinghamshire, England

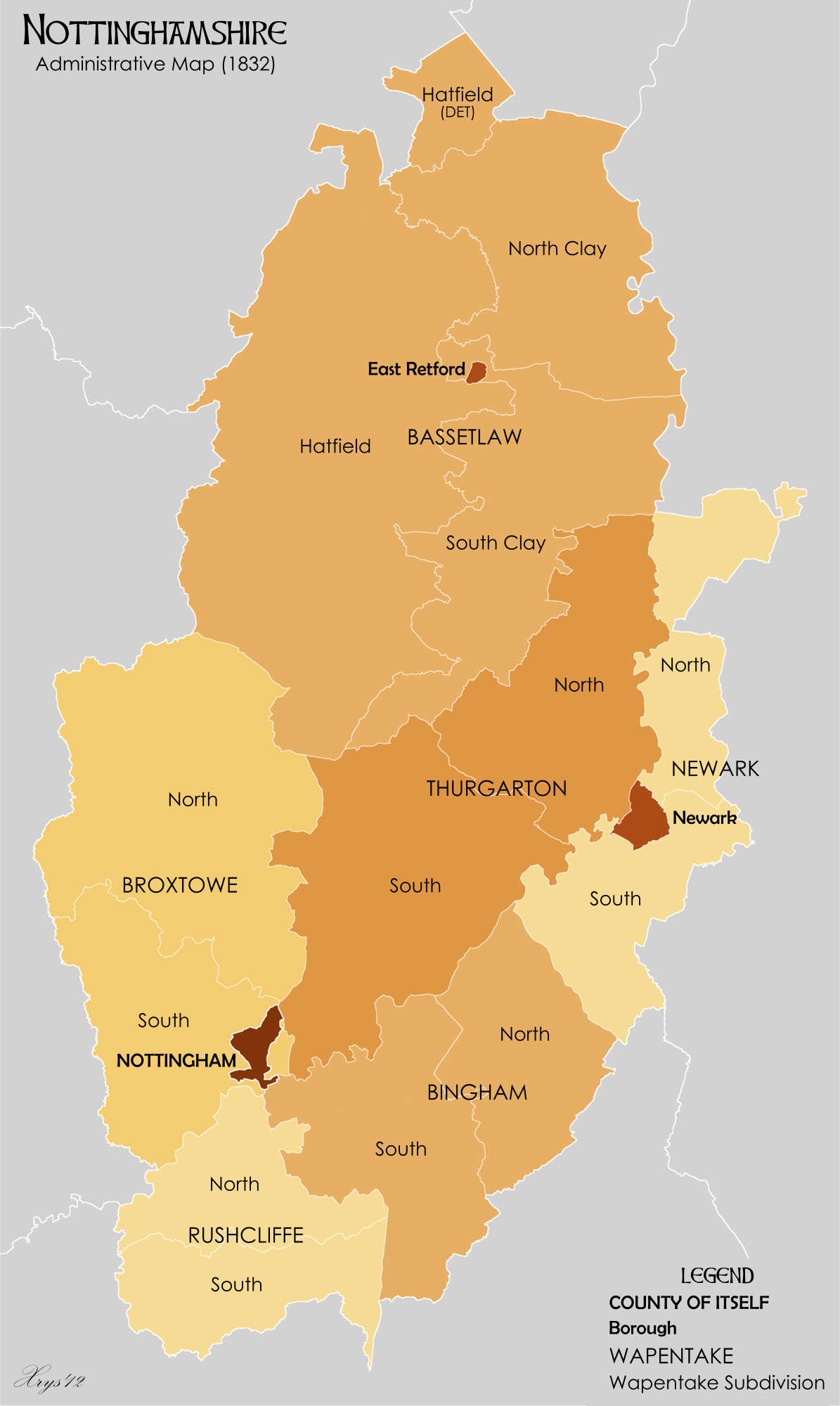
Map showing the Bingham wapentake

Bingham was a wapentake (equivalent to a hundred) of the historic county of Nottinghamshire, England. It was in the south-east of the county, to the south of the River Trent.

== Constituents ==
The original meeting place was on the Toot Hill ridge, west of Bingham. The wapentake covered the parishes of Adbolton, Aslockton, Bingham, Car Colston, Clipston on the Wolds, Colston Bassett, Cotgrave, Cropwell Bishop, Cropwell Butler, East Bridgford, Elton, Flintham, Gamston, Granby, Hawksworth, Hickling, Holme Pierrepont, Kinoulton, Kneeton, Langar cum Barnstone, Lodge on the Wolds, Normanton-on-the-Wolds, Orston, Owthorpe, Plumtree, Radcliffe on Trent, Saxondale, Scarrington, Screveton, Shelford, Thoroton, Tithby, Tollerton, Upper Broughton, West Bridgford, Whatton and Wiverton Hall.

Contained within it were eastern parts of the present-day Rushcliffe borough, and western parts of the Vale of Belvoir. Its residual significance was lost with the introduction of districts under the Local Government Act 1894.
