= Aslockton =

Village and civil parish in Nottinghamshire, England

Coordinates: 52.95°N 0.90°W

- Village and civil parish
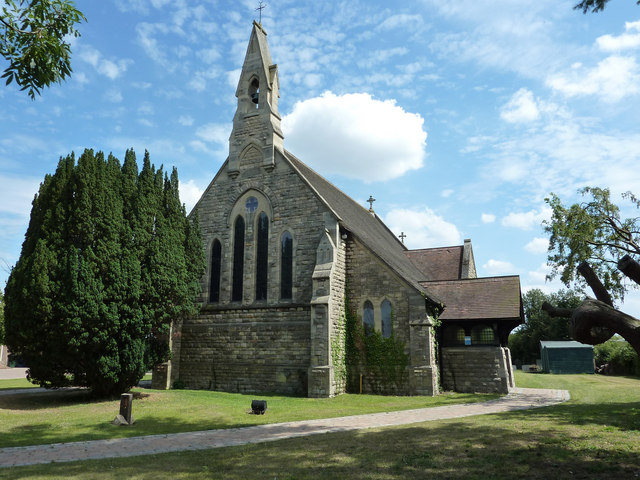
- St Thomas’ Church

- Location within Nottinghamshire
- Interactive map of Aslockton
- Area: 1.84 sq mi (4.8 km^{2})
- Population: 1,937 (2021)
  - Density: 1,053/sq mi (407/km^{2})
- OS grid reference: SK 7440
  - London: 105 mi (169 km) SSE
- District: Rushcliffe
- Shire county: Nottinghamshire
- Region: East Midlands
- Country: England
- Sovereign state: United Kingdom
- Post town: Nottingham
- Postcode district: NG13
- Dialling code: 01949
- Police: Nottinghamshire
- Fire: Nottinghamshire
- Ambulance: East Midlands
- UK Parliament: Newark
- Website: aslockton-pc.org.uk

Aslockton is an English village and civil parish 12 miles (19 km) east of Nottingham and 2 miles (3.2 km) east of Bingham, on the north bank of the River Smite opposite Whatton-in-the-Vale. The parish is also adjacent to Scarrington, Thoroton and Orston and within the Rushcliffe borough of Nottinghamshire. The population was recorded as 974 in the 2011 census, doubling to 1,937 at the 2021 census.

== Toponymy ==
Appearing as Aslachetone in the Domesday Book of 1086, the place name seems to contain an Old Norse personal name Aslakr + tūn (Old English) meaning an enclosure, a farmstead, a village, an estate, etc., so "Farm or settlement of a man called Aslakr". There are 19 such place names (a Scandinavian personal name followed by tūn ) in Nottinghamshire, all of them in the Domesday survey, and all apparently ancient villages.

== Heritage ==
All that remains of the 12th-century Aslockton Castle are some earthworks. The motte, called Cranmer's Mound, stands about 16 feet (5 m) high.

Thomas Cranmer, Archbishop of Canterbury 1533–1553, was born in Aslockton and lived until the age of 14 in his parents' cottage, which still stands on Main Street. The Archbishop Cranmer Church of England Primary School (an academy since 2014, having opened in 1968), the Cranmer Pre-School, and the local social facility, the Thomas Cranmer Centre, are named after him. (For secondary education, Toot Hill School in Bingham has a sixth form and academy status.) Aslockton originally had its own Holy Trinity Chapel, a peculiar under the collegiate church of Southwell Minster rather than the diocesan bishop, but this fell into ruins and was incorporated into a private house. Some remains of it can still be seen. Cranmer and his father worshipped at the Church of St John of Beverley, Whatton. He has also given his name to a local prospect mound.

John Cranmer, a gentleman, was living in "Aslacton", in 1452.

The population of Aslockton was 171 in 1801, 273 in 1821, and 289 in 1831. The village had a population of 363 in 1936.

The land for Aslockton Cemetery was purchased in 1869, at which time the only place of worship in the village was a Methodist chapel, which has since been converted into flats.

The present Grade II listed St Thomas's Church was designed by the architect Sir Reginald Blomfield and erected in 1890–1892 in memory of a former vicar of Whatton, Thomas K. Hall, who drowned in February 1890 as RMS Quetta was wrecked off Queensland on her way to Thursday Island. His mother, Mrs Sophia E. Hall, paid for the church. The Quetta window on the north wall depicting the shipwreck was designed by Michael Stokes in 2002, as was the east window, dedicated to Cranmer, which has Jesus showing his hands to Doubting Thomas. The church has a single bell in a bell cote at the west end.

The parish forms part of the Cranmer group, with Hawksworth, Scarrington, Thoroton, Whatton and Orston. The incumbent is Rev. Tim Chambers. The vicarage is in Aslockton.

== Amenities ==
The Thomas Cranmer Centre opened in 2010 and serves as the village hall as well as the church hall. It replaced an earlier village hall and is attached to the parish church on Main Street.

Despite the village's small size, it had two pubs: the Old Greyhound and the Cranmer Arms. The former closed in May 2007, but the new owners submitted a planning application to turn it into a restaurant. The restaurant was not included in the final housing development. The village has a small shop, which includes a post office and a dry-cleaning service. Aslockton Hall houses a nursing and residential home for the elderly, recent guests have included Rachel Lester, Pink tribute act, Ant & Seb and Spacky.

The Aslockton windmill and bake house stood in Mill Lane (grid reference SK739408). The mill was a wooden post mill, weather-boarded on a brick roundhouse, with four single patent sails. The miller and baker in 1864 was Job Heathcote.

The village railway station has regular services to Nottingham, Grantham, Spalding and Skegness. There is a bus service to Bingham and Bottesford for onward connections to Nottingham, Newark and Grantham.

== Governance ==
Aslockton has a parish council that belongs under Rushcliffe Borough Council.

The local free quarterly newsletter, delivered to every house, is called The Voice.

== Sports ==
Whatton and Aslockton have a joint cricket club said to date back before 1815. It has two senior teams in the South Nottinghamshire Cricket League and a colts team in the Newark Under 15s Premiership League. Aslockton Cranmer Football Club fields several teams for adults and youngsters. There is also a tennis club, and table tennis teams at the Thomas Cranmer Centre.

== Famous residents ==
In birth order

- Thomas Cranmer (1489–1556), Archbishop of Canterbury, leader and martyr of the English Reformation, was born in Aslockton.
- John Robertson (born 1953), Scotland and Nottingham Forest footballer, took over the Old Greyhound pub for some years from 1986.
- Chris Urbanowicz, rock musician, was born in Aslockton in 1981.

== See also ==
- Aslockton Castle
- Thomas Cranmer
- Listed buildings in Aslockton
