= Orston =

Village and civil parish in Nottinghamshire, England

Coordinates: 52°57′N 0°52′W

- Village and civil parish
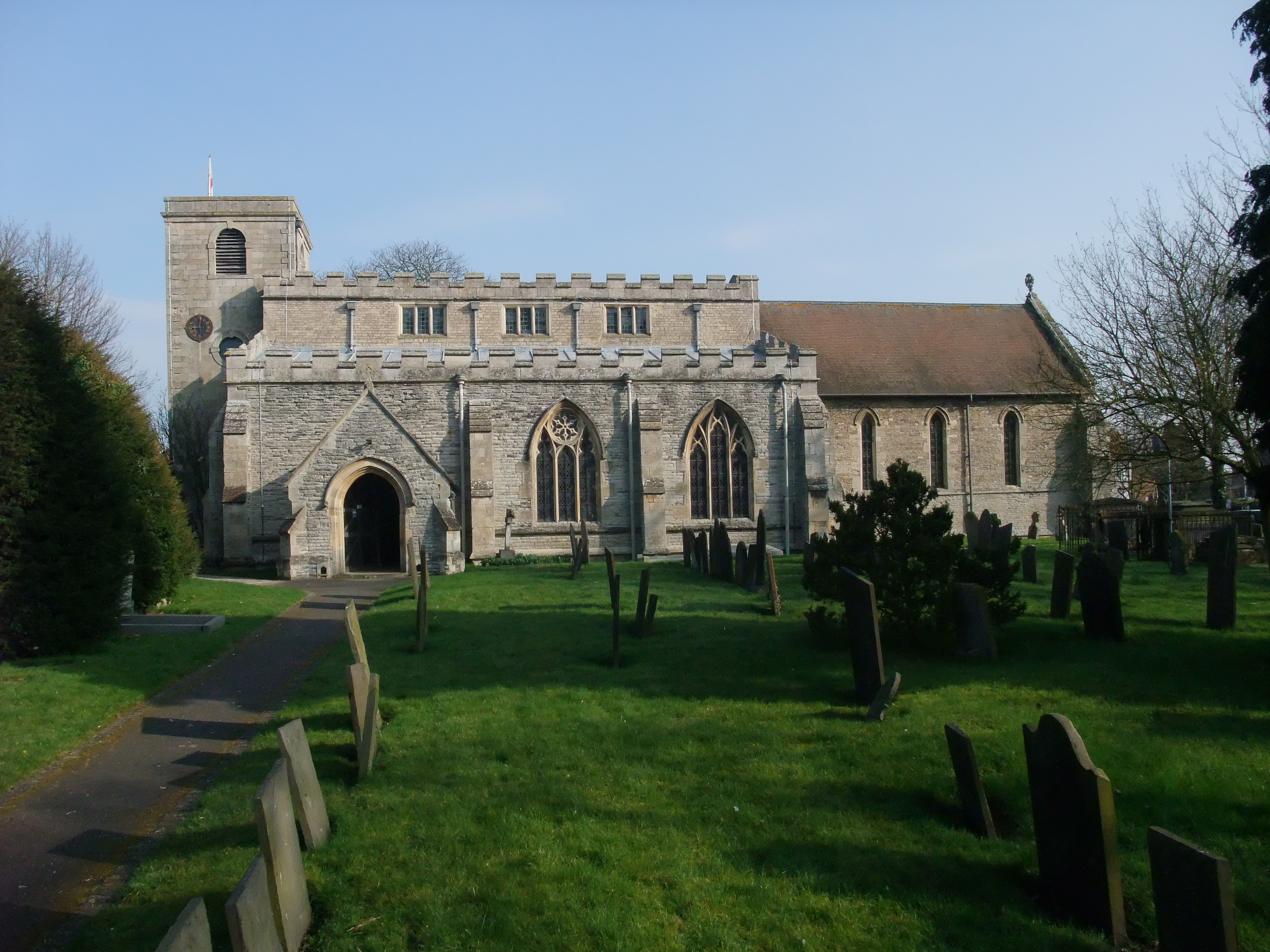
- St Mary's Church, Orston

- Location within Nottinghamshire
- Interactive map of Orston
- Area: 3.05 sq mi (7.9 km^{2})
- Population: 512 (2021)
  - Density: 168/sq mi (65/km^{2})
- OS grid reference: SK 770410
  - London: 105 mi (169 km) SSE
- District: Rushcliffe
- Shire county: Nottinghamshire
- Region: East Midlands
- Country: England
- Sovereign state: United Kingdom
- Post town: NOTTINGHAM
- Postcode district: NG13
- Dialling code: 01949
- Police: Nottinghamshire
- Fire: Nottinghamshire
- Ambulance: East Midlands
- UK Parliament: Newark
- Website: www.orstonparish.co.uk

Orston is an English village and civil parish in the Rushcliffe borough of Nottinghamshire, 15 miles (24 km) east of Nottingham. It borders the parishes of Scarrington, Thoroton, Flawborough, Bottesford and Elton on the Hill. The population at the 2011 census was 454, increasing to 512 residents at the 2021 census.

== History ==
The place-name Orston seems to contain an Old English personal name, Osica, with -ingtūn (Old English), a settlement called after, or connected with..., so probably, "farm/settlement connected with Osica". Some early spellings are Oschintone in the Domesday Book of 1086, Orskinton in 1242, Orston in 1284, and Horston in 1428. It lay in Bingham Wapentake (hundred) until such units were abolished under the Local Government Act 1894.

The population of Orston was 351 in 1801, 391 in 1821, and 439 in 1831. More detail on the village history and sources for it appears on the village website. There is a short description of the village in 1870–1872 in John Marius Wilson's Imperial Gazetteer of England and Wales.

Orston farming showed a variant of the open-field system with four fields instead of three. An enclosure act was passed in 1793. A survey of Orston's present appearance and history as a conservation area was made in 2010.

== Governance ==
Orston has a parish council and belongs under Rushcliffe Borough Council. The member of parliament for the Newark constituency, to which Orston belongs, is Robert Jenrick of Reform UK.

== Gypsum, brickworks and spa ==
There are still gypsum quarries in the area. Indeed, Orston in earlier centuries was once primarily a mining village, and probably the most important source of gypsum in the East Midlands. According to the Nottinghamshire volume of the Victoria History of the Countries of England, the gypsum at Orston was the "finest in the Kingdom". The remains of several brickworks have also been identified. Mining subsidence has been a problem in some parts of the village, affecting also the church. A full account of the quarrying and mining in the village has appeared.

The village had a brief 18th-century period as a medicinal spring for "hydrochondriac melancholy, scurvy, want of appetite, indigestion, stoppage of urine, obstruction of the bowels, ulcers in the lungs, and for spitting of blood", but there does not appear to have been appreciable commercial development of the spring.

== Amenities ==
The village contains two churches: St Mary's Anglican Church, and Orston Methodist Church. St Mary's is a Grade I Listed Building that forms part of the Cranmer Group, with St Thomas's, Aslockton, St Mary and All Saints, Hawksworth, St John of Beverley, Scarrington, St Helena's, Thoroton and St John of Beverley, Whatton. Services are held about twice a month. The north aisle displays a restored military drum beaten at the Battle of Waterloo. A notable record of the possessions owned by the church was made in the 16th century.

The Methodist church is part of the Grantham and Vale of Belvoir Circuit. Services are held on alternate Sunday mornings.

The eight other listed buildings in the village are all Grade II. Among them is Orston Hall (once Orston Rectory) by the architect Charles Baily.

The nearest shopping centres are at Bingham (6 miles, 10 km) and Newark (10 miles, 16 km).

== School ==
Orston Primary School, occupying premises built in 1939, had 158 pupils aged four to eleven in 2018, equally divided between boys and girls.

The 2010 full Ofsted report on the school rated it outstanding in all important respects. Its excellent 2013 performance figures eased slightly in most subjects.

== Leisure ==
The village pub, The Durham Ox, doubles as a traditional restaurant from Tuesday to Sunday. A delicatessen and café called The Limehaus previously occupied the former post office, which now serves as a day spa.

There are various sports teams, clubs, and institutes active in the village. Many indoor events and meetings are held at the Village Hall. There is a clay shooting ground in Bottesford Lane.

== Transport ==
Elton and Orston railway station on the outskirts of the village provides only a skeleton service of one train in each direction per day. The nearest stations with regular services to Nottingham, Grantham, and beyond are Bottesford (2.4 miles, 4 km) and Aslockton (2.3 miles, 3.7 km).

A local hourly bus links Orston with Bingham and nearby villages.

The A52 trunk road between Nottingham and Grantham passes two miles south of the village. It is reached at Elton on the Hill, in a south-easterly direction at Bottesford, or in a westerly direction via Scarrington. Orston also lies on National Cycle Route 15.

== Environment ==
The slow-running River Smite, which bounds the village on the western side, is 20 miles long. It is paralleled at Orston by the Northing and Bon Moor Drains. The Smite has its source at Holwell, Leicestershire, and flows into the River Devon at Shelton.

Orston Millennium Green, created for 2001 beside the Smite on donated land, has a mown area for recreation and other sections with various nature and wildlife preservation areas. It is surrounded by a footpath. There are playing fields off Spa Lane.

== Famous people ==
In birth order:

- Charles John Fynes Clinton, classical scholar, was appointed vicar of Orston in the 1820s.
- William Morley, Methodist minister and historian in New Zealand, was born at Orston on 14 August 1842.
- Thomas Cecil Howitt, architect of the Nottingham Council House, died at his self-designed house at Orston in September 1968.

== See also ==
- Listed buildings in Orston

== Bibliography ==
- Briscoe, John Potter (1881). Old Nottinghamshire. British Library Historical Print Editions 2011. "A 1552 terrier (inventory) of vestments, books and other possessions of Orston Church"

== External sources ==
- Orston Parish Council website
- Orston Village Hall website
- Cine films of Orston made in 1960 and later can be found on YouTube in six parts Retrieved 27 May 2016.
- Orston – A Nottinghamshire Village through the Ages by Paul Barnes (1995) gives a full account. Retrieved 27 May 2016.
