= Church of St John of Beverley =

Church of St John of Beverley may refer to:

- St John of Beverley Church, Beverley
- Church of St John of Beverley, Scarrington
- Church of St John of Beverley, Whatton

== See also ==
- St. John's Church (disambiguation)
