= Whatton-in-the-Vale =

Village in Nottinghamshire, England

Coordinates: 52.95°N 0.89°W

- Village and civil parish
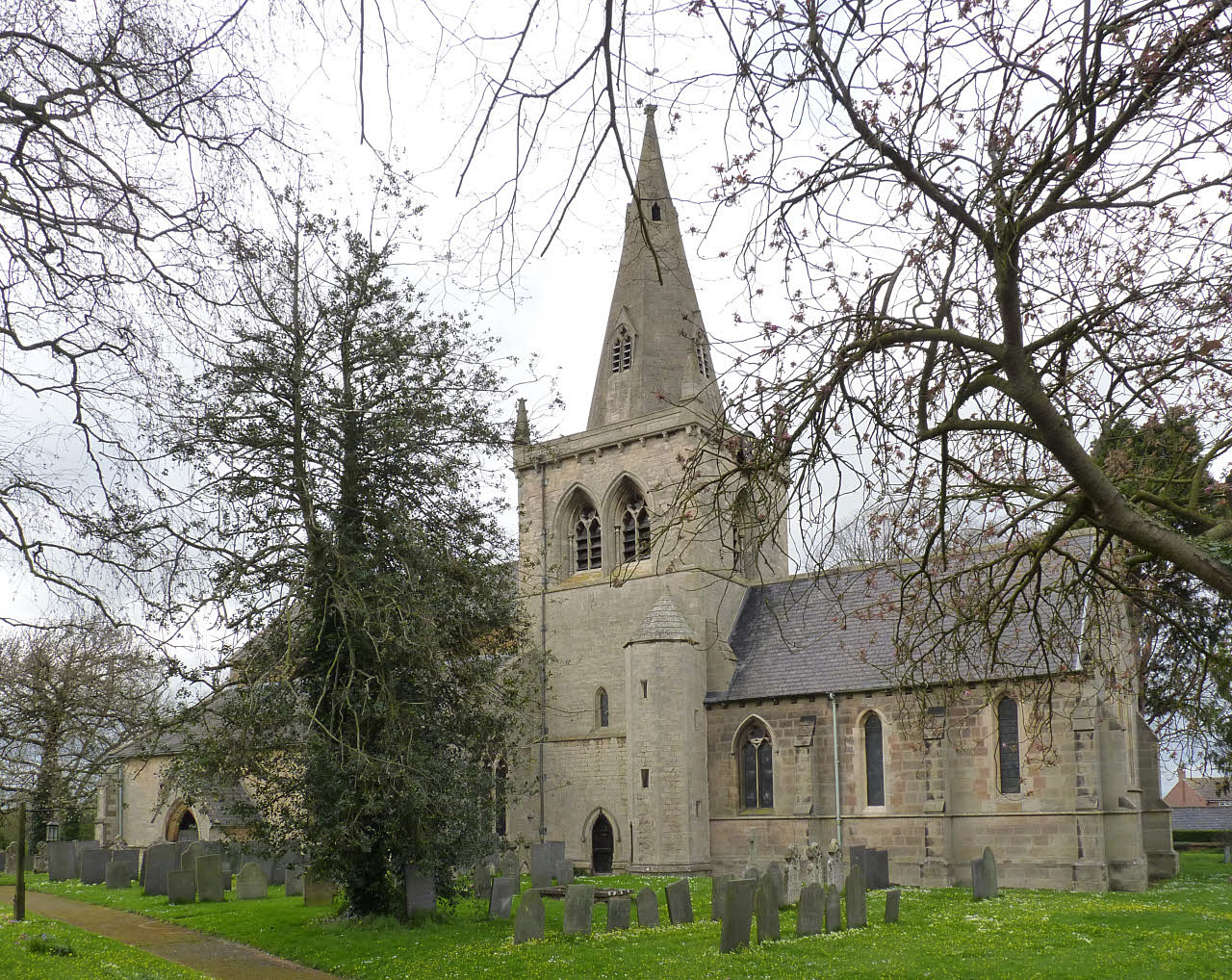
- St John of Beverley Church, Whatton in the Vale

- Location within Nottinghamshire
- Interactive map of Whatton-in-the-Vale
- Area: 2.8 sq mi (7.3 km^{2})
- Population: 874 (2021)
  - Density: 312/sq mi (120/km^{2})
- OS grid reference: SK 746392
  - London: 105 mi (169 km) SSE
- Civil parish: Whatton-in-the-Vale
- District: Rushcliffe
- Shire county: Nottinghamshire
- Region: East Midlands
- Country: England
- Sovereign state: United Kingdom
- Post town: NOTTINGHAM
- Postcode district: NG13
- Dialling code: 01949
- Police: Nottinghamshire
- Fire: Nottinghamshire
- Ambulance: East Midlands
- UK Parliament: Newark
- Website: https://whatton.org.uk

Whatton-in-the-Vale is a village and civil parish in the Rushcliffe district, in the county of Nottinghamshire, England. It lies in the Vale of Belvoir, with the River Smite to the west and a subsidiary, the River Whipling to the east, mainly north of the trunk A52 road, 12 miles (19 km) east of Nottingham. The parish had a population of 843 at the 2011 census, increasing to 874 at the 2021 census.

== Etymology ==
The place name seems to contain the Old English word hwǣte for wheat, + tūn (Old English) meaning an enclosure, a farmstead, a village, an estate, etc., so "Farm where wheat is grown." "In the Vale," i. e. the Vale of Belvoir. The place appears as Watone in the Domesday Book of 1086.

== Heritage ==
Whatton Mill was a five-storey brick tower windmill built in 1820. It had four patent sails (sails with shutters instead of cloth), two of which were double. Milling ceased in about 1916. The capless tower is now a listed building.

The Anglican Church of St. John of Beverley is a Grade II* listed building dating from the 14th century, but extensively restored and rebuilt in the 19th century. It belongs to the Cranmer Group of parishes, with the churches at Aslockton, Hawksworth, Orston, Scarrington and Thoroton. A service is held in Whatton once a month.

The population of Whatton was 306 in 1801, 399 in 1821, and 388 in 1831.

Whatton Manor estate, to the south of the village, was inherited in 1840 by Thomas Dickinson Hall (1808–1879), who built a substantial manor house there in "Elizabethan style". The family financed charitable and church-building work in the district. The manor house and its grounds were sold in 1919 to Samuel Ernest Chesterman, who in turn sold them to William Goodacre Player, son of John Player of the cigarette manufacturers John Player & Sons). The manor building, by then in poor condition, was demolished in the mid-1960s, but the original stables can still be seen from Manor Lane. They now house a stud farm.

The village pub, the Griffin's Head, was closed and demolished in the mid-1990s and replaced by housing.

Whatton was once a named telephone exchange for many of the surrounding villages, but the name gave way to a dialling code (01949).

== Governance ==
Whatton has its own parish council. The village falls under the governance of Rushcliffe Borough Council. The member of Parliament is Robert Jenrick (Conservative), MP for Newark.

== Transport ==
=== Road ===
The contract for the A52 bypass was given in March 1970 for 1.5 miles, to Nottinghamshire County Council. The subsequent £190,000 bypass opened on Wednesday May 12 1971, with room for a possible dual carriageway.

=== Rail ===
Whatton is served by Aslockton railway station, less than a mile to the north of the village, with services to Grantham, Skegness and Nottingham. Limited bus services run to Bingham and to Grantham via Bottesford.

== Prison ==
HM Prison Whatton opened at the west end of the village in 1960 as a detention centre. Since 1990 it has been a Category C closed male prison for sex offenders.

== See also ==
- Listed buildings in Whatton-in-the-Vale
