= Thomas Shipman (disambiguation) =

Thomas Shipman may refer to:

- Thomas Shipman (1632-1680), English poet
- Tom Shipman (1910-1972), English footballer, see List of Oldham Athletic A.F.C. players (25–99 appearances)
