= Charles Clinton (disambiguation) =

Charles Clinton (1690–1773) was an Anglo-Irish soldier and politician in colonial America.

Charles Clinton may also refer to:

- Charles John Fynes Clinton (1799–1872), English clergyman and classical scholar
- Lord Charles Clinton (1813–1894), British Conservative politician
- Charles W. Clinton (1838–1910), American architect
