= River Devon =

River Devon may refer to several places:

- River Devon, Clackmannanshire, a tributary of the River Forth in Clackmannanshire, Scotland
- River Devon, Nottinghamshire, a tributary of the River Trent, England
