= Listed buildings in Whatton-in-the-Vale =

Whatton-in-the-Vale is a civil parish in the Rushcliffe district of Nottinghamshire, England. The parish contains seven listed buildings that are recorded in the National Heritage List for England. Of these, one is listed at Grade II*, the middle of the three grades, and the others are at Grade II, the lowest grade. The parish contains the village of Whatton-in-the-Vale and the countryside to the south. The listed buildings consist of a church, a group of headstones in the churchyard and its boundary wall, a house, a road bridge, a windmill and a stable block.

== Key ==
Grade	Criteria
II*	Particularly important buildings of more than special interest
II	Buildings of national importance and special interest

== Buildings ==
Name and location	Photograph	Date	Notes	Grade
Church of St John of Beverley; 52.94931°N 0.89259°W		12th century	The church has been extended and much altered through the centuries. It is built in stone with slate roofs, and consists of a nave, north and south aisles, north and south porches, a chapel, a chancel, and a steeple at the crossing. The steeple has a tower has three stages, buttresses, a string course, a two-stage canted stair turret, double lancet bell openings with hood moulds, a clock face, a parapet with four pinnacles, and a recessed octagonal spire with two tiers of gabled lucarnes, a finial, and a weathercock.	II*
Tyler's Cottage; 52.94827°N 0.89122°W	—	Early 17th century	The house has a timber-framed core, it is mainly encased in brick with whitewashed roughcast, and has a pantile roof with a single coped gable. Thee are two storeys and an L-shaped plan, with a front range of four bays. On the east front is a gabled porch flanked by bow windows, and the other windows are casements. At the northeast corner are three bays of close studded timber framing.	II
Group of headstones, Church of St John of Beverley; 52.94940°N 0.89285°W		1710	The seven headstones are in the churchyard to the west of the church. They are in Leicestershire slate, and to the memory of members of the Carpendale family. The headstones have various designs and inscriptions and are dated between 1710 and 1748.	II
Thorough Bridge; 52.94074°N 0.91727°W		Mid 18th century	The bridge carries Granby Lane over the River Smite. It is in red brick with stone cutwaters and parapet copings. There are three arches, the central one is elliptical, and the outer ones are small and round.	II
Windmill; 52.94479°N 0.89526°W	—	c. 1820	The windmill is in brick, and consists of a tapering round tower with five stages. On the southeast side is a pair of doors and a brick and stone platform, and the windows are iron casements with chamfered surrounds and segmental heads.	II
Stable Court, Whatton Manor; 52.93378°N 0.89780°W	—	1839	The stable court of the demolished house is in Jacobean revival style, and is in yellow brick with stone dressings, and has slate roofs with shouldered coped gables. The buildings form a square plan, with an adjoining wing, and are in one and two storeys, with ranges of seven and five bays. The windows are metal casements. To the southwest is a square gatehouse with three stages, on a chamfered plinth, with a string course, an embattled parapet, and octagonal corner towers with ogee domes. It contains a pair of gates with fleur-de-lis heads, over which is a panel containing a clock, and a stepped hood mould with a coat of arms.	II
Boundary Wall, Church of St John of Beverley; 52.94939°N 0.89195°W	—	Mid 19th century	The wall on the north and east sides of the churchyard is in brick and stone with gabled copings. On each side is a pair of chamfered brick piers with square stepped caps, a pair of spearhead iron gates, and a wrought iron overthrow with a lamp bracket.	II
