= Screveton =

Village in Nottinghamshire

Coordinates: 52.9853°N 0.9118°W

- Village and civil parish
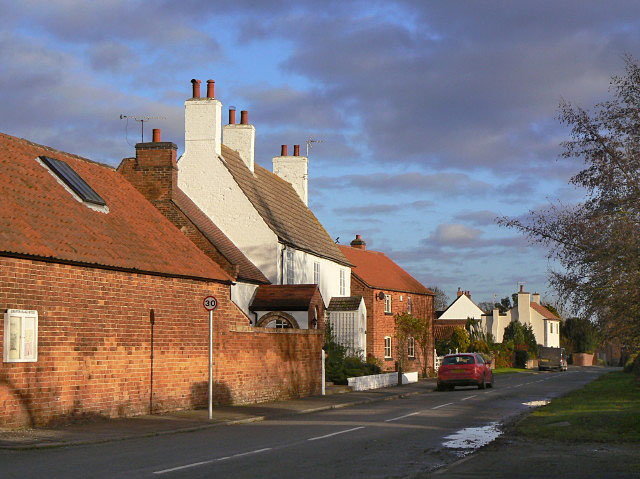
- Hawksworth Road, Screveton

- Location within Nottinghamshire
- Interactive map of Screveton
- Area: 2 sq mi (5.2 km^{2})
- Population: 164 (2021)
  - Density: 82/sq mi (32/km^{2})
- OS grid reference: SK 732437
  - London: 105 mi (169 km) SSE
- District: Rushcliffe
- Shire county: Nottinghamshire
- Region: East Midlands
- Country: England
- Sovereign state: United Kingdom
- Post town: NOTTINGHAM
- Postcode district: NG13
- Dialling code: 01949
- Police: Nottinghamshire
- Fire: Nottinghamshire
- Ambulance: East Midlands
- UK Parliament: Newark

Screveton (pronounced locally "Screveeton" or "Screeton") is an English civil parish and village in the Rushcliffe borough of Nottinghamshire, with (including Kneeton) 191 inhabitants at the 2011 census. Screveton singularly reported 164 residents at the 2021 census. It was formerly in Bingham Rural District and before 1894 in Bingham Wapentake. It is adjacent to Kneeton, Flintham, Hawksworth, Scarrington, Little Green and Car Colston.

== Toponymy ==
Screveton may contain the Old English word scīr-rēfa for a sheriff or the king's executive, + tun (Old English), an enclosure; a farmstead; a village; or an estate, so probably "Sheriff's farm/settlement".

== Heritage ==
Richard Whalley, who died at the old hall in Screveton in 1583, had been elected to Parliament four times in the troubled Tudor period. His three successive wives bore him a total of 25 children. A fine monument to him in the parish church bears an inscription:

Behold his Wives were number three:
Two of them died in right good fame:
The Third this Tomb erected she,
For him who well deserv'd the same.
Both for his life and Godly end,
Which all that knows must needs commend:
And they that knows not, yet may see,
A worthy Whalleye loe was he.
Since time brings all things to an end,
Let us our selves applye,
And learn by this our faithful friend,
That here in Tombe doth lye,
To fear the Lord, and eke beholde
The fairest is but dust and Mold:
For as we are, so once was he:
And as he ys, so must we be."

The hall was demolished in the 1820s. The population of the village at the beginning of the 1870s was 241 in 60 houses. The main landowners at that time were the politicians Sydney Pierrepont, 3rd Earl Manvers, and Thomas Thoroton-Hildyard, a descendant of the 17th-century local historian Robert Thoroton. Two young men from Screveton who died for their country in the First World War are remembered on a memorial stone in the village churchyard.

== Listed buildings ==
St Wilfrid's is a Grade I listed building from the 13th century, restored in the 1880s. Other listed edifices in the village include the Old Priest's House, Top Farmhouse and adjacent buildings, and the circular pinfold, whose unusual shape is also found in pounds at Scarrington and Flintham.

== Religion ==
St Wilfrid's Church, Screveton forms a joint Anglican parish with St Mary's Church, Car Colston. They now belong with Flintham, Kneeton and East Bridgford to the Fosse Group of parishes. A service of Holy Communion is held at Screveton every two weeks at 10.30 am. Two former Methodist chapels in the village are now residences, but there is still an active Methodist church at Scarrington 2.5 miles (4.0 km) away.

== Transport and facilities ==
Screveton lies 1 mile/1. km from the A46 road between Newark-on-Trent and Leicester, which meets the A52 road between Grantham and Nottingham at Saxondale. The nearest station is at Aslockton, which has daily trains every one or two hours between Nottingham and Grantham or Skegness. Screveton has a service of three buses a day on weekdays to Bingham and to Newark.

The nearest pub is the Royal Oak at Car Colston (1 mile/1.6 km). Retail and catering facilities can be found 4 miles/6.4 km away in Bingham. There are primary schools at Flintham (1.9 miles/3.1 km), East Bridgford (2.9 miles/4.7 km) and Bingham. Toot Hill School in Bingham is a secondary school with a sixth form and academy status.

== External sources ==
- Screveton St Wilfrid. History
- Thorotons and Hildyards
- Screveton Hall

== See also ==
- Scranton, Pennsylvania
