= Listed buildings in Thoroton =

Thoroton is a civil parish in the Rushcliffe district of Nottinghamshire, England. The parish contains five listed buildings that are recorded in the National Heritage List for England. Of these, one is listed at Grade I, the highest of the three grades, and the others are at Grade II, the lowest grade. Grades are designated by interest in preservation. The parish contains the village of Thoroton and the surrounding area. All the listed buildings are in the village, and consist of a church, a pigeoncote, a manor house, a house and a range of associated buildings.

== Key ==
Grade	Criteria
I	Buildings of exceptional interest, sometimes considered to be internationally important
II	Buildings of national importance and special interest

== Buildings ==
Name and location	Photograph	Date	Notes	Grade
St Helena's Church; 52.97471°N 0.86249°W		11th century	The church has been altered and extended through the centuries, particularly between 1868 and 1869. It is built in stone with tile roofs, and consists of a nave with a clerestory, north and south aisles, a south porch, a chancel, a vestry and a west steeple. The steeple has a tower with three stages, buttresses, a chamfered and moulded plinth, a canted stair turret, two string courses, a corbel table with masks and gargoyles, a quatrefoil pierced balustrade, and a recessed octagonal spire with three tiers of lucarnes and a weathercock. On the west front is an ogee-headed crocketed niche with a finial, containing a tripartite pedestal, and flanked by moulded panels containing damaged angels.	I
Pigeoncote; 52.97302°N 0.86529°W		14th century	The pigeoncote is in stone with a conical thatched roof. It consists of a round tower with two stages and a string course. On the north side is a doorway, and the south side has two tiers of pigeonholes.	II
Manor Farmhouse; 52.97492°N 0.86275°W		Mid 17th century	The manor house is in stone and brick, colourwashed and partly rendered, on a partial stone plinth, with dentilled eaves and slate roofs. There are two storeys and an L-shaped plan, with a main range of six bays, a gabled wing, a garage, an outbuilding with a porch, and a lean-to. The windows are a mix of sashes, and casements with segmental heads.	II
Thoroton Hall; 52.97360°N 0.86490°W		Early 18th century	A house in red brick with blue brick diapering, on a stone plinth, with slate roofs, stone coped gables and kneelers. There are two storeys and attics, and a double depth plan, with parallel ranges of four bays, and a lower two-storey four-bay service wing on the left. The doorway has a fanlight, and the windows are sashes.	II
Stable, coach house, blacksmith's forge and wall 52.97382°N 0.86497°W	—	18th century	A range of buildings in red brick, with dentilled eaves, and pantile roofs with a brick coped gable at the south. There is a long rectangular plan with a single storey and a loft, the stable is in the north part, the coach house is to the south, and the tack room is between. The lower range on the south gable contains the forge. At the south end, a buttressed brick wall with flat stone coping links with the house.	II
