= Aslockton Castle =

Coordinates: 52.95403°N 0.89402°W

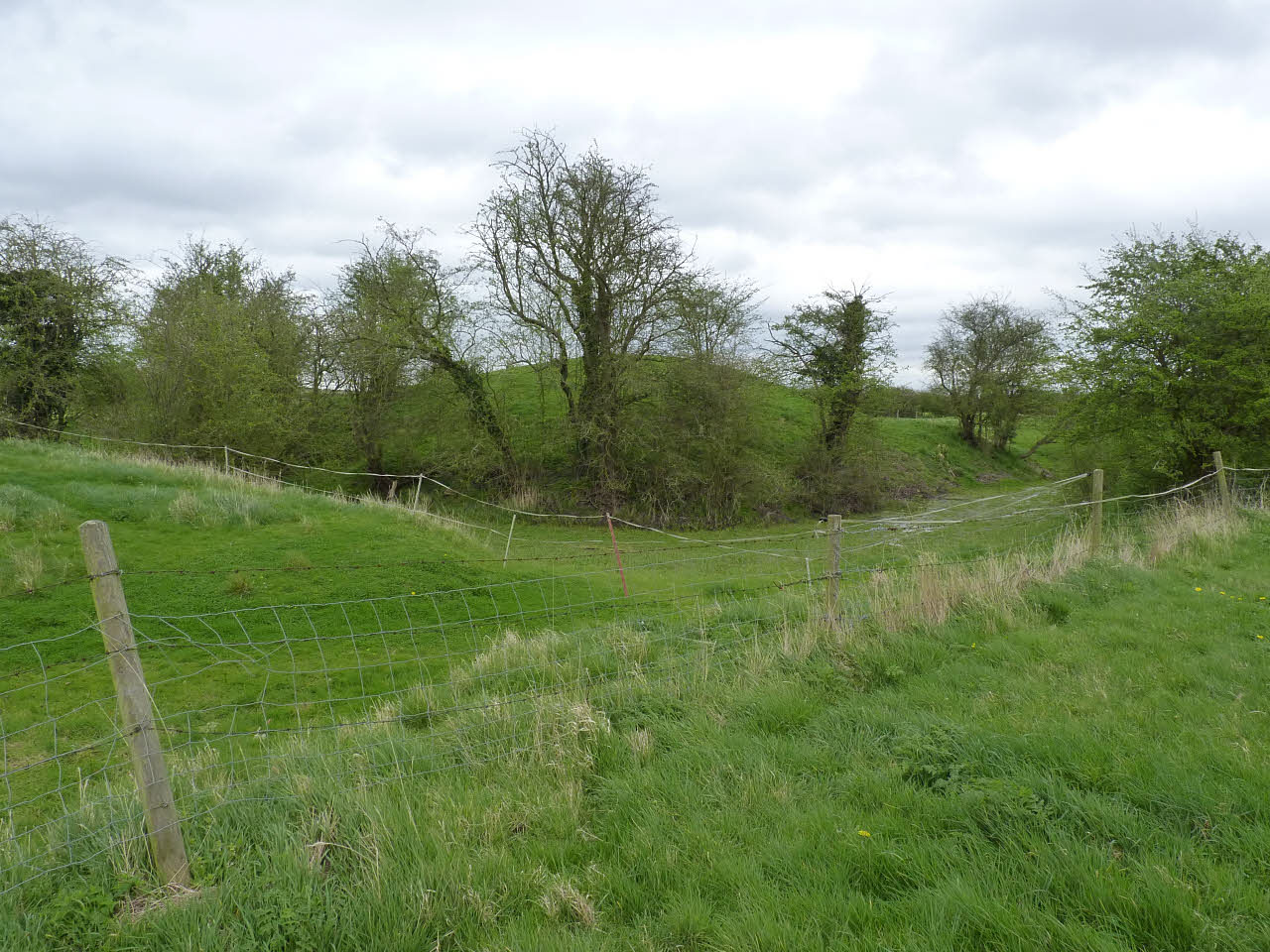
Cranmer's Mound

Aslockton Castle is a ruined fortification, a motte-and-bailey castle, in the village of Aslockton, Nottinghamshire. (grid reference SK744402) The original name of the settlement was Aslachetone, which suggests a possible Norse origin; it was mentioned in the Domesday Book of 1086 where it was described as a large settlement.

A motte-and-bailey fortress was built in the 12th century. Only the earthworks now remain. The precise date as to when the castle was built is unknown. However, it was most probably built in the 11th or the early 12th century. The ground plan of the castle is in the shape of a parallelogram, which houses two courts, one of which is square in form. The motte most probably had a wooden tower and a palisade. The castle had two rectangular baileys, an inner bailey and an outer bailey, with the smaller outer bailey used for livestock. The moat of the castle would have been fed from the nearby stream.

At some stage the fort went out of use and was replaced by a manorial site which later became Saucer Farm. The earthworks surrounding the baileys were modified to form fishponds, fed by the stream that had filled the moat. Additional channels were dug, and sluice gates controlled the water flow. Later, formal gardens were laid out around the ponds and the motte served as an elevated viewing platform.

The motte, which today stands 16 feet high, is now called Cranmer's Mound or Cranmer's mount after Thomas Cranmer, who was born here in 1489, and rose to become Archbishop of Canterbury. According to local accounts, he used to sit on the high mound during his early youth to listen to the tuneable bells of the nearby church of Whatton-in-the-Vale. Previously the locals had named the mound Bailey Hills. To the south east two rectangular platforms enclosed by ditches are the sites of later houses of the Cranmer family.

The site is a scheduled monument.
