= Listed buildings in Aslockton =

Aslockton is a civil parish in the Rushcliffe district of Nottinghamshire, England. The parish contains two listed buildings that are recorded in the National Heritage List for England. Both the listed buildings are designated at Grade II, the lowest of the three grades, which is applied to "buildings of national importance and special interest". The parish contains the village of Aslockton and the surrounding countryside. Both the listed buildings are in the village, and consist of a railway platform shelter and a church.

== Buildings ==
Name and location	Photograph	Date	Notes
Shelter, Aslockton railway station 52.95151°N 0.89800°W		Late 19th century	The railway platform shelter was built for the Great Northern Railway. It is timber framed with timber cladding, and has a hipped Welsh slate roof with spike finials. There is a single storey, a rectangular plan, and five bays. The left four bays have windows with three lights and each has a mullion, a transom and a shaped head. In the right bay are two lights and a doorway.
St Thomas's Church; 52.95381°N 0.89623°W		1891–92	The church was designed by Arthur Blomfield in Early English style. It is built in Ancaster stone, the interior is lined with red brick, and the roof is tiled. The church consists of a nave, a south aisle, a south porch, a south transept and organ chamber, and a chancel with a north vestry. On the nave is a corbelled bell turret with cross-gables, a finial and a cross. The windows are chamfered lancets, most with hood moulds, and the chancel has three stepped lancets. The porch has a plinth, the superstructure is in timber, it has a gable with bargeboards, and the doorway has a four-centred arched head.
