= William Morley (New Zealand Methodist) =

New Zealand Methodist minister and historian (1842–1926)

William Morley (14 August 1842 – 24 May 1926) was a New Zealand Methodist minister and historian. He was born in Orston, Nottinghamshire, England, on 14 August 1842.
