= Listed buildings in Scarrington =

Scarrington is a civil parish in the Rushcliffe district of Nottinghamshire, England. The parish contains seven listed buildings that are recorded in the National Heritage List for England. Of these, one is listed at Grade I, the highest of the three grades, and the others are at Grade II, the lowest grade. The parish contains the village of Scarrington and the surrounding area. The listed buildings consist of a church, houses and associated structures, a smithy and a pinfold.

== Key ==
Grade	Criteria
I	Buildings of exceptional interest, sometimes considered to be internationally important
II	Buildings of national importance and special interest

== Buildings ==
Name and location	Photograph	Date	Notes	Grade
Church of St John of Beverley; 52.96675°N 0.90718°W		14th century	The church has been altered and extended through the centuries, including a restoration and alterations in 1867 by J. H. Hakewill. It is built in stone with tile roofs, and consists of a nave, a south aisle, a chancel, a vestry and a west steeple. The steeple has a tower with two stages, corner buttresses, a string course, moulded eaves, a moulded parapet, and a recessed spire containing three tiers of lucarnes with ogee heads, a finial and a wind vane. On the west side is a doorway with foliate and ball flower bands, and the remains of a hood mould with a finial, above which is a double lancet window, on the south side are stair lights, and the bell openings have ogee heads.	I
The Old Hall; 52.96727°N 0.90691°W		c. 1700	A farmhouse in brick on a plinth, with floor bands, dentilled eaves, and a roof of tile and pantile with coped gables and kneelers. There are three storeys and an L-shaped plan, with a front of four bays, and a lean-to in the angle. On the main front is a central stair window, the lower two floors contain casement windows, and in the top floor the windows are sashes. At the rear are two bow windows.	II
Scarrington House, farm buildings, wall and pump 52.97432°N 0.89634°W	—	Early 19th century	A farmhouse in brick and stone on a brick plinth, with modillion eaves and roofs of pantile and slate. There are three storeys and an L-shaped plan, with a front range of three bays, and a two-storey rear service wing. On the front is a stone portico with Doric columns, a dentilled cornice, a wrought iron balcony railing, and a round-headed doorway with a reeded surround and a fanlight. Most of the windows are sashes, and in the gable are round-headed casements. To the right is a coped brick wall containing a doorway with a segmental head, and attached is a lead pump with a timber case and a stone trough. Further to the right are stables, the openings mainly with segmental heads.	II
Garden pavilions, Scarrington House; 52.97418°N 0.89684°W	—	Early 19th century	The two garden pavilions are in stone and brick with hipped slate roofs. Each pavilion has a single storey, a single bay, flat slab coping and urns. The left pavilion has large square openings, and in the right pavilion is a plank door and a small casement window.	II
Pigeoncote, Scarrington House; 52.97438°N 0.89582°W	—	Early 19th century	The pigeoncote is in brick with stone dressings, dentilled eaves and a pyramidal pantile roof. There are two stages and a square plan. In the front is a pair of elliptical-headed carriage doors with a stone surround, above is an opening with a chamfered surround and a segmental head, and on the top is a square timber glover with a pyramidal roof and an elaborate wind vane.	II
The Smithy; 52.96627°N 0.90712°W		c. 1840	The smithy is in whitewashed brick with dentilled eaves and a lean-to pantile roof. There is a single storey and two bays. It contains a doorway and casement windows.	II
Pinfold; 52.96622°N 0.90692°W		Mid 19th century	The pinfold is in brick with stone dressings, and has a circular plan with gabled brick coping. The opening has a chamfered brick pier with an impost and a spiked wrought iron gate.	II
