= Listed buildings in Orston =

Orston is a civil parish in the Rushcliffe district of Nottinghamshire, England. The parish contains nine listed buildings that are recorded in the National Heritage List for England. Of these, one is listed at Grade I, the highest of the three grades, and the others are at Grade II, the lowest grade. The parish contains the village of Orston and the surrounding area. All the listed buildings are in the village, and consist of houses, farmhouses and associated structures, and a church.

== Key ==
Grade	Criteria
I	Buildings of exceptional interest, sometimes considered to be internationally important
II	Buildings of national importance and special interest

== Buildings ==
Name and location	Photograph	Date	Notes	Grade
St Mary's Church; 52.96257°N 0.85608°W		13th century	The church has been altered and extended through the centuries, the tower is dated 1766, and there were restorations in 1888–90 and in 1913–14. The church is built in stone with tile roofs, and consists of a nave with a clerestory, north and south aisles, a south porch, a chancel and a west tower. The tower has a chamfered plinth, projecting quoins, a west doorway, a clock face, windows, bell openings and a parapet. All the openings have round heads, architraves, imposts and keystones. Along the nave and aisles are embattled parapets.	I
Orston Hall; 52.96245°N 0.85789°W		Late 17th century	A country house that was refronted in the mid-18th century. It is in brick and stone, partly rendered, on a chamfered plinth, with stone dressings, quoins, corner pilasters, floor bands, moulded and dentilled eaves, a pierced balustrade, and tile roofs. There are two storeys and attics and an L-shaped plan, with a main range of five bays, and a single storey billiard room. The main doorway has a round head, a moulded surround and pilasters. Most of the windows are sashes, those on the front with eared and shouldered moulded architraves, and there are three dormers with segmental pediments on scroll brackets. Elsewhere, there are casement windows, some with segmental heads, and horizontally-sliding sashes.	II
The Gables; 52.95969°N 0.85328°W		Late 17th century	The farmhouse is in whitewashed and pebbledashed brick, on a plinth, with cogged floor bands, and roofs of tile and slate with coped gables, one a 17th-century shaped gable. There are two storeys and attics, and an L-shaped plan., with a front range of three bays, and a double-depth rear wing. In the angle is a Classical cast iron porch and a doorway with a fanlight. Most of the windows are sashes, some horizontally-sliding, and some with segmental heads.	II
Hamilton's Farmhouse; 52.95893°N 0.85551°W	—	Late 17th century	The farmhouse is in brick, partly rendered, with a floor band, dentilled eaves, and a pantile roof with coped gables and kneelers. There are two storeys and an L-shaped plan, with a main range of five bays, lower two-storey extensions at each end, and a rear wing with a lean-to. In the centre is a doorway, and most of the windows are horizontally-sliding sashes, those in the ground floor with segmental heads. Elsewhere, there are casement windows, and a blank gabled dormer.	II
The Chestnuts; 52.96065°N 0.85296°W	—	Late 17th century	A house in stone and brick, partly rendered, on a plinth, with a cogged floor band, rebated and dentilled eaves and pantile roofs. It is in two and three storeys, and has an L-shaped plan, with a main range of three bays. There is a canted bow window, and the other windows are a mix of casements and sashes, some horizontally-sliding.	II
The Woodlands; 52.96198°N 0.85537°W	—	Early 18th century	A farmhouse in brick, with cogged and dentilled eaves, and a pantile roof with a single coped gable. There are two storeys and attics, and an L-shaped plan, with a main range of three bays, a rear wing, and a lean-to bake oven. The doorway is in the centre, most of the windows are casements, and the openings have segmental heads.	II
Gate piers, Orston Hall; 52.96220°N 0.85710°W	—	Late 18th century	The gate piers flanking the entrance to the drive are in stone. They are square and rusticated, with plinths, corniced caps, and bases for ball finials.	II
The Ferns, railing, shop, cottage and stable 52.96159°N 0.85548°W	—	c. 1785	The house is in brick with dentilled eaves and a pantile roof. There are two storeys and an L-shaped plan, with a front range of three bays, and the buildings are five bays deep. In the centre is a doorway with a fanlight, most of the windows are horizontally-sliding sashes, and the ground floor openings have segmental heads. To the right is a lean-to shop with a canted bay window, and at the rear are a cottage and a stable. In front of the house is hairpin railing and a gate.	II
Laburnum Cottage; 52.96126°N 0.85225°W	—	c. 1800	The house is in brick on a plinth, with dentilled eaves, and a pantile roof with coped gables. There are two storeys and an L-shaped plan, with fronts of three and four bays. The central doorway has a segmental head and a fanlight. The windows are casements, those in the ground floor at the front with segmental heads.	II
