= River Smite =

River in Leicestershire and Nottinghamshire, England

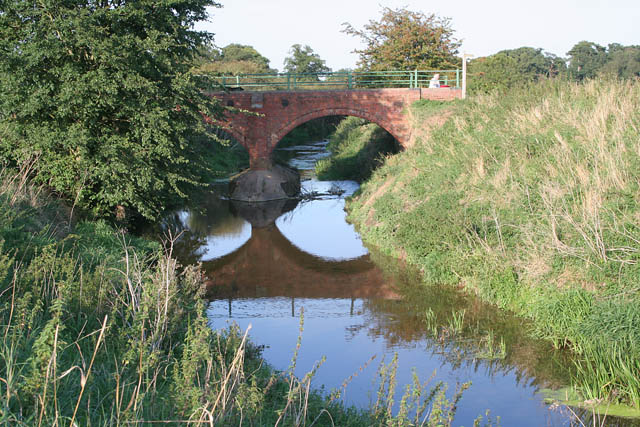
- Smite near Shelton

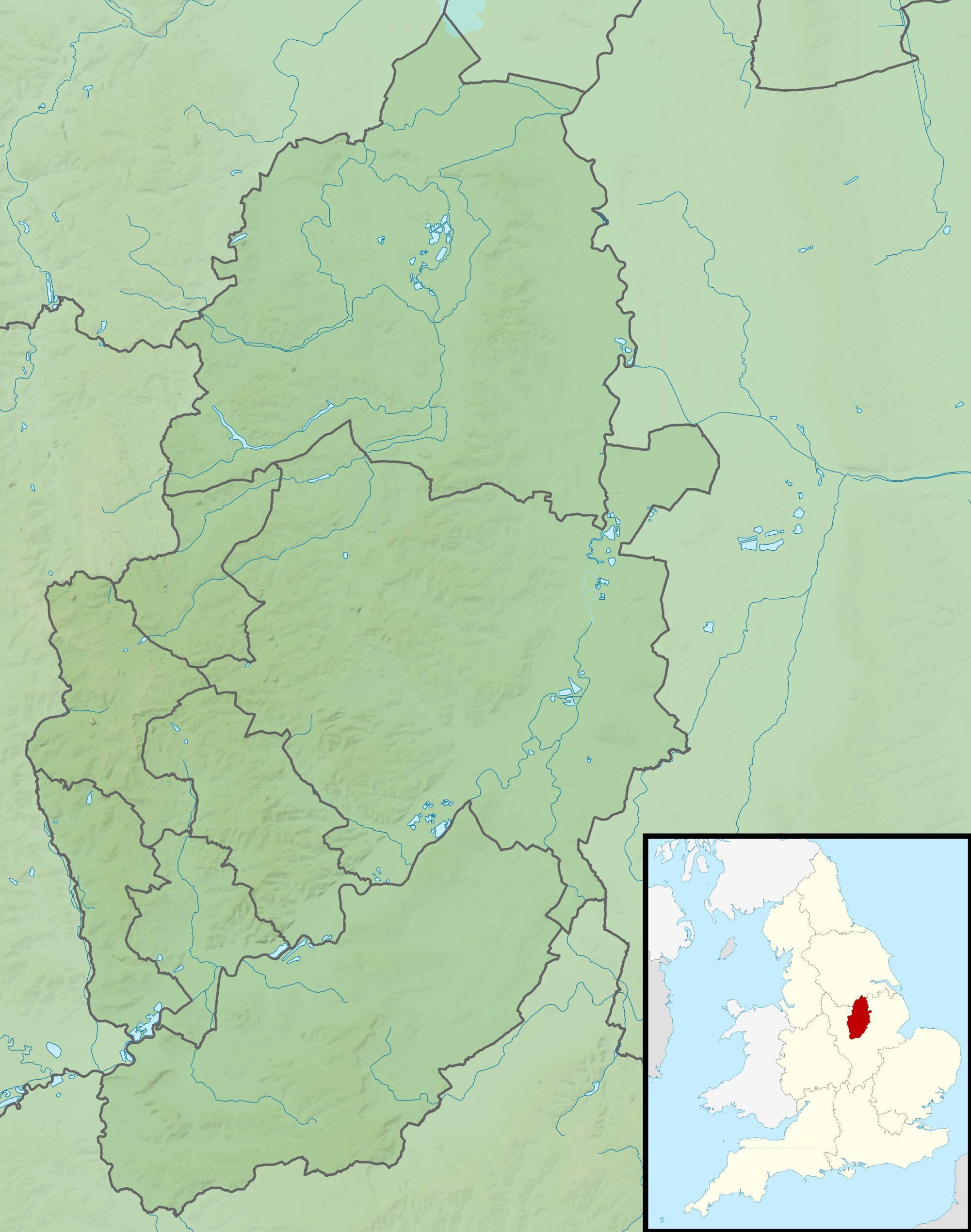
- Mouth of the Smite in Nottinghamshire

Location
- Country: England
- Counties: Leicestershire, Nottinghamshire

Physical characteristics
- Source
  - location: Holwell, Leicestershire
- Mouth
  - location: Shelton, Nottinghamshire
  - coordinates: 52.9972°N 0.8235°W
- Length: 32 km (20 mi)
- Basin size: 193 km^{2} (75 sq mi)

The River Smite, a tributary of the River Devon, flows for 20 miles (32 km) through Leicestershire and south-east Nottinghamshire, England. The source is near the hamlet of Holwell, Leicestershire and it joins the Devon near Shelton, Nottinghamshire. The Smite and its tributaries, such as the River Whipling, the Stroom Dyke, and the Dalby Brook, drain an area of 193 square kilometres (75 mi^{2}) of farmland in the Vale of Belvoir.

== Name ==
In the 17th century the river was known as the Snite. This and the modern spelling are thought to derive from the Old English smita, denoting a foul or miry place. This links with another Old English word smitan, which means to daub or pollute. It implies that the Smite was a dirty, miry stream.

== Sources ==
The river draws from several springs near Holwell, along a spring line where the local permeable ironstone meets the lower mudstones on the flank of the Bleak Hills, which form part of the Belvoir Ridge. However, the source of the Smite is also attributed to another spring 1 km to the north called Holwell Mouth, a chalybeate or mineral spring in a wooded ravine to the north of Holwell. The spring is now disused, but in the 17th and 18th centuries was thought to have healing properties and had stone seating for those taking the waters. It contains iron salts that give it a reddish colour and ostensibly a sulphurous taste. The name Holwell, of Saxon origin, means "spring or stream in a hollow".

== Course ==
Various tributaries that descend from the Bleak Hills join the Smite as it flows in a north-westerly direction, before turning north-east at the bottom of the escarpment, into the lower-lying Vale of Belvoir. It is spanned by an aqueduct of the Grantham Canal, then continues in a north-westerly direction to meet Dalby Brook. This tributary drains the south-west of the catchment, rising near Old Dalby, then flowing between Upper and Nether Broughton and past Hickling to the junction with the Smite. Beyond this confluence the river flows through Colston Bassett and beside Wiverton Hall, where it is joined by the Stroom Dyke. It continues through farmland, until it reaches the A52, where it passes between the villages of Whatton-in-the-Vale and Aslockton. It is joined by the River Whipling as it flows past the remains of the motte and bailey of Aslockton Castle. The river continues north-east, beside the villages of Orston, Thoroton, Flawborough and Shelton, where it meets the River Devon.

== River Whipling ==
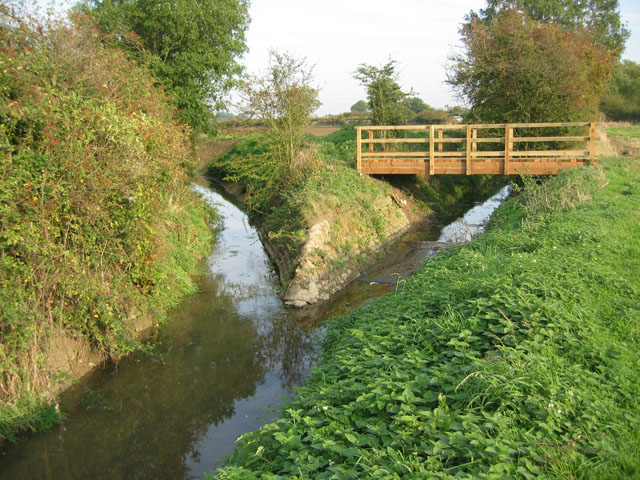
The Grimmer and the Rundle Beck, join to form the Whipling

The River Whipling is the main tributary of the Smite and 6 miles (9.7 km) long. Its source is the confluence of two tributaries, the Rundle Beck and the Grimmer, which meet near Granby. The Whipling then flows around the village, before taking a north-easterly course to join the Smite near Whatton.

The Whipling and tributaries drain some 52 square kilometres (20 mi^{2}) of the Vale of Belvoir, contributing about a quarter of the Smite's catchment area.
