= Scarrington =

Village and civil parish in Nottinghamshire, England

Coordinates: 52.965834°N 0.906966°W

- Village and civil parish
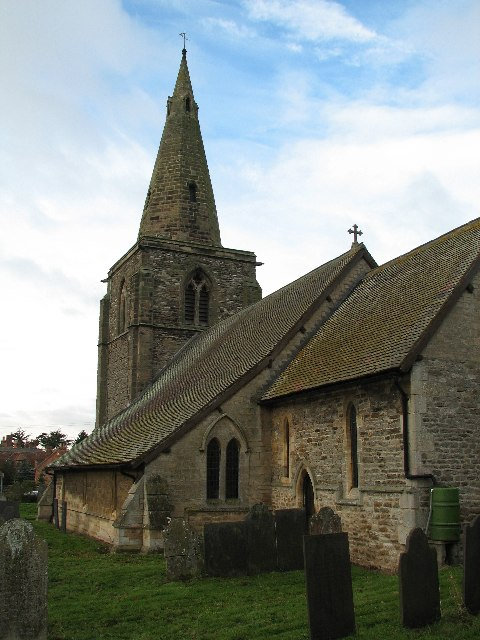
- Church of St John of Beverley, Scarrington

- Location within Nottinghamshire
- Interactive map of Scarrington
- Area: 1.51 sq mi (3.9 km^{2})
- Population: 167 (2021)
  - Density: 111/sq mi (43/km^{2})
- OS grid reference: SK7341
  - London: 105 mi (169 km) SSE
- District: Rushcliffe
- Shire county: Nottinghamshire
- Region: East Midlands
- Country: England
- Sovereign state: United Kingdom
- Post town: NOTTINGHAM
- Postcode district: NG13
- Dialling code: 01949
- Police: Nottinghamshire
- Fire: Nottinghamshire
- Ambulance: East Midlands
- UK Parliament: Newark

Scarrington is an English civil parish and small village in the Rushcliffe borough of Nottinghamshire, adjacent to Bingham, Car Colston, Hawksworth, Orston and Aslockton. Its 968 acres (392 ha; 3.92 km^{2}; 1.513 sq mi) had a population in the 2011 census of 183, falling to 167 at the 2021 census. It lies at Ordnance Survey grid reference SK7341 in the undulating farmland of the Vale of Belvoir, some 2 miles (3.2 km) from the town of Bingham and from a stretch of the Roman Fosse Way (A46) between Newark and Leicester. It is skirted by the A52 road between Nottingham and Grantham.

== Governance ==
Most local government functions are performed by Rushcliffe Borough Council. The borough election results on 7 May 2015 confirmed Conservative control. Scarrington lies in Bingham East ward and its small population qualifies it only for a twice-yearly Parish Meeting, not a Parish Council.

The member of Parliament (MP) for Newark, the constituency in which Scarrington is located in, is the Conservative Robert Jenrick.

== Toponymy ==
Scarrington may contain the Old English word, scearnig meaning dirty, filthy or mucky, + tun (Old English), an enclosure; a farmstead; a village; or an estate, so perhaps "Dirty farm or settlement".

== Heritage ==
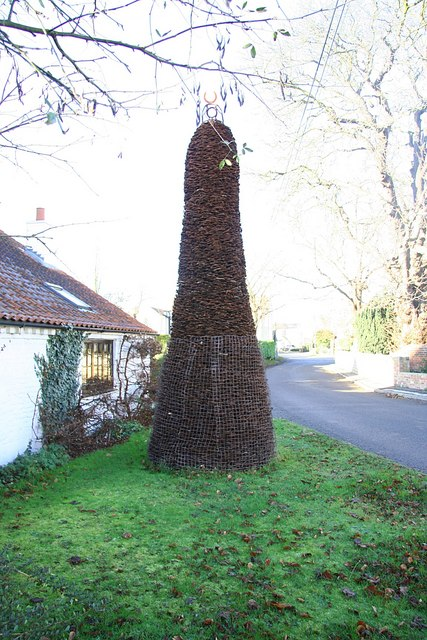
The Scarrington horseshoes

A flint sickle blade found at Scarrington in 1981 was dated to the late Neolithic age. There is also evidence that Scarrington was inhabited in Roman times (2nd–3rd century AD), in the shape of tools and remains of a villa. These were found while laying a water pipe in February/March 1991 between the village and Car Colston. Scarrington is noted in the Domesday Book of 1086 as "Scarintone" and as belonging to the king. It had 27 households.

Scarrington and Aslockton shared several landowners and could be covered by a joint enclosure act in 1781. The population of Scarrington was 152 in 1801, 171 in 1821, and 188 in 1831. The size of the village changed little from the time of enclosure up to the 20th century, when some building took place northward along Hawksworth Road. A few working farms remain, but most inhabitants commute to work or school. Scarrington was in Bingham Rural District up to 1974 and before 1894 in Bingham Wapentake.

The village lies mainly within a conservation area, established in 1990 and extended in October 2010, which includes four listed buildings, mature trees and wide grass verges. There is a unique 15-ft (4.88 m) pile of horseshoes outside the Grade II listed Smithy. It consists of some 50,000 discarded horseshoes, and was constructed by the village blacksmith between about 1945 and 1965, while working in the adjacent Old Forge.

The medieval Anglican parish Church of St John of Beverley, Scarrington, a 13th-century building restored by J. H. Hakewill in 1867–1869, is Grade I listed. The belfry has three bells dated 1450.

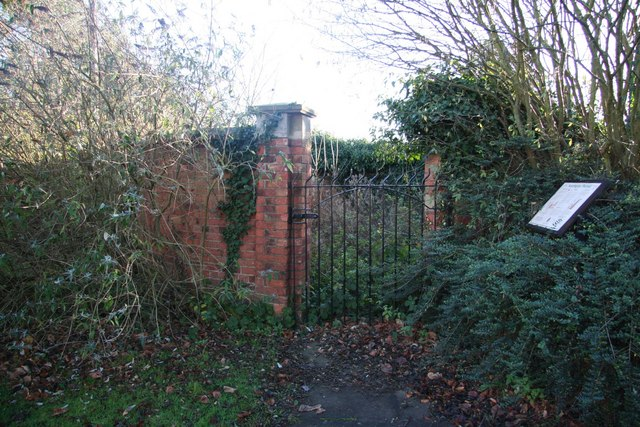
The Scarrington Pinfold

A Methodist chapel was built in 1818.

Another Grade II listed edifice is the village pinfold opposite the Smithy. It has 1.83 m brick walls with copings and is unusual in being circular. However, the pinfolds at nearby Flintham and Screveton are also circular, and it is suggested that all three were built by the same unidentified builder in the 19th century. Scarrington's has a diameter of 6.1 m. Renovation was carried out on it in 1988 and 2012.

The village's third Grade II listed building is the old hall, Scarrington House in Hawksworth Road, built about 1700 for the Shipman family, prominent in the village since Elizabethan times.

There was a hamlet of some 16 cottages known as Little Lunnon to the south of Scarborough. These thatched dwellings of poor quality were built in the mid-18th century to house the "impotent poor", under powers given to parish overseers under the Poor Relief Act 1601. That purpose was strictly served until the passage of the Poor Law Amendment Act 1834, after which the destitute poor were sent to Bingham workhouse instead, but many Little Lunnon cottages remained occupied. The last two derelict cottages were demolished by the council as uninhabitable in 1945. Many houses for the poor in earlier centuries were built on waste land, which may explain why the hamlet stood apart from the village.

Here is an extract from A Topographical Dictionary of England (London: S. Lewis, 1848): "SCARRINGTON, a parish, in the union, and N. division of the wapentake, of Bingham, S. division of the county of Nottingham, 12½ miles (E. by N.) from Nottingham; containing 230 inhabitants. The living is annexed to the vicarage of Orston: the tithes were commuted for land and money payments in 1780. There is a place of worship for Wesleyans." The parish link with Orston lasted until February 1867, when the chapelry of Scarrington was combined with that of Aslockton (hitherto under Whatton) to make a new vicarage: Scarrington-with-Aslockton. The two parishes separated again in 1919, when Aslockton, with its newly built church, was paired again with Whatton.

== Amenities ==
=== Public transport ===
Scarrington has only twice-weekly bus services – No. 856 runs between Lowdham and Bottesford via Bingham twice in each direction on Tuesdays and Thursdays. The nearest stop regularly served is in Aslockton (1.5 miles/2.4 km). Aslockton railway station (1.3 miles/2.1 km) has trains every one or two hours towards Nottingham and Grantham or Skegness.

=== Education ===
There are primary schools in Aslockton and Bingham. Toot Hill School in Bingham has a sixth form and academy status. The premises of Scarrington's old school in Aslockton Road now form a private house. Until the mid-1950s, there was a private junior school at The White House in Main Street. It was run by Dorothy Standish (1887–1973), daughter of Rev. John Standish, who had been vicar of the Scarrington/Aslockton parish from 1885 until his death in 1918.

=== Social activities ===
Scarrington parish church forms part of the Cranmer group of Anglican parishes in the Diocese of Southwell and Nottingham. It has services only on major festivals. Scarrington Methodist Church in Main Street has a 6 pm service on alternate Sundays and a monthly Bible study session. It belongs to the Grantham and Vale of Belvoir Circuit.

Scarrington's Women's Institute (WI) meets at the WI Hall, Hawksworth Road, on the first Thursday of the month at 7.30 pm.

=== Commercial facilities ===
Scarrington has a used-car dealer in Main Street, a commercial and domestic laundry, and a barbers' at Manor Farm. Otherwise the nearest retail, medical and professional services are in Bingham. There is a filling station at Saxondale (3 miles/4.8 km). The Cranmer Arms in Aslockton and the Royal Oak in Car Colston (2 miles/3.2 km) are the nearest pubs. The nearest accommodation is in Bingham (2 miles/3.2 km) and Elton on the Hill (2.2 miles/3.6 km).

== Notable people ==
- Thomas Shipman (1632–1680), royalist poet, playwright and landowner, was born in Scarrington, baptised there in November 1632, and died there on 15 October 1680. He was the author of Carolina, or, Loyal Poems (1683).
- Sarah Churm (born 1980), television actress, was born in Scarrington.
- Roy Keane (born 1971), footballer, lived in Scarrington while playing for Nottingham Forest.

== See also ==
- Listed buildings in Scarrington
