= Charles John Fynes Clinton =

English clergyman and classical scholar

Charles John Fynes Clinton (1799–1872) was an English clergyman and classical scholar.

== Life ==
He was born 16 April 1799, the third son of the Rev. Charles Fynes Clinton, LL.D., prebendary of Westminster, and a brother of Henry Fynes Clinton, the chronologist. He was educated at Westminster School, and at Oriel College, Oxford, graduating B.A. in 1821.

On 16 March 1826, he married Caroline Clay in Burton-on-Trent. She had been born in Burton-on-Trent on 27 July 1798, the daughter of Joseph Clay and Sarah née Spender. Ten months later, Caroline died, with her first-born, a daughter Caroline, in childbirth on 11 January 1827, in Burton-on-Trent.

He was god-father to Caroline's nephew, Charles John Clay (21 Aug 1828 – 14 Apr 1910), named after him, the first Charles in the Clay family.

Having held some parochial charges, he was appointed in 1828 to the rectory of Cromwell, Nottinghamshire. He was also vicar of Orston in the same county. He died in 1872.

== Works ==
In 1842 he published 'Twenty-one plain Doctrinal and Practical Sermons,' London, 1842; and in 1853 edited and completed for publication 'An Epitome of the Civil and Literary Chronology of Rome and Constantinople,' which had been left unfinished by his brother Henry. In 1864 he edited and published the 'Literary Remains' (London, 1864) of his brother.
