= Church of St Mary and All Saints, Hawksworth =

Anglican church in Nottinghamshire, England

Coordinates: 52°59′00″N 00°52′48″W

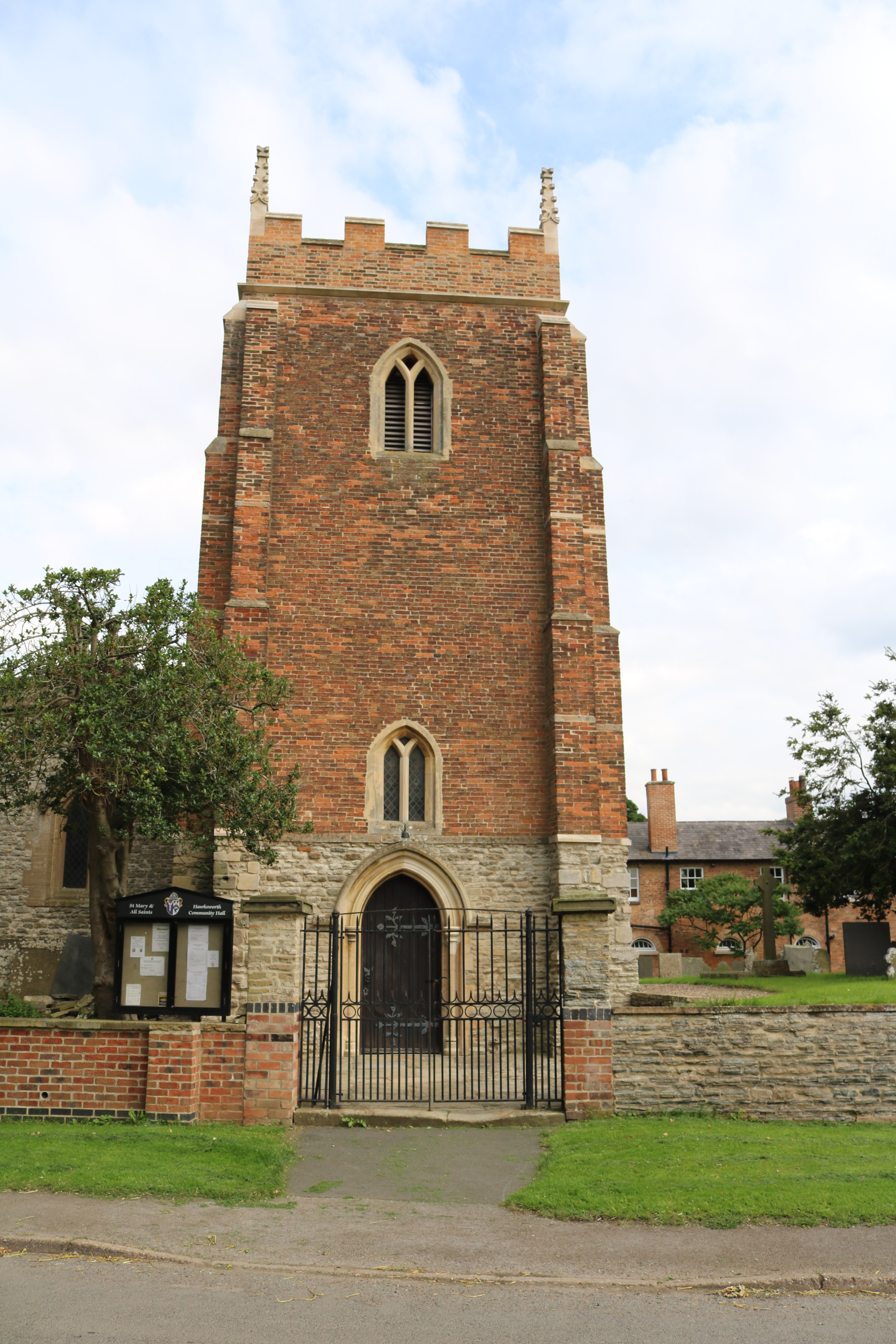
- A photograph of the Church facing the west door
- Church of St Mary and All Saints, Hawksworth
- Denomination: Church of England
- Website: http://www.achurchnearyou.com/hawksworth/

History
- Dedication: St Mary and All Saints

Administration
- Province: York
- Diocese: Southwell and Nottingham
- Archdeaconry: Nottingham
- Deanery: East Bingham
- Parish: Hawksworth

Clergy
- Vicar: Vacant

The Church of St Mary and All Saints, Hawksworth, is the Church of England parish church in Hawksworth, Nottinghamshire. It is Grade II* listed by the Department for Digital, Culture, Media and Sport as a particularly significant building of more than local interest.

== Description ==
=== Setting ===
The Grade II* listed Church of St Mary and All Saints stands at the centre of Hawksworth. It has been described as one of the village's "most obvious landmarks". It has also been identified as an "attractive central focal point".

=== Current benefice ===
Since 1967, Hawksworth's has formed one of The Cranmer Group of local benefices, along with:

- St Thomas's Church, Aslockton
- Church of St John of Beverley, Scarrington
- St Helena's Church, Thoroton
- Church of St John of Beverley, Whatton
- St Mary's Church, Orston

=== Services ===
There is a service in the church at 9 a.m. on the 4th Sunday of the month.

== Heritage ==
The present church building dates back to the 12th century, most probably to about 1150, but there are documentary indications of an earlier, Saxon church dedicated, or dedicated also to St Edmund the Martyr. The church possesses a cross shaft with Danish Viking scroll and Christian cross ornamentation on two faces, which has been dated to the late 9th or early 10th century, but there are no surviving indications of Saxon work in the church fabric.

References to St Edmund recur in church documents up to the 16th century as the dedication of an adjunct to the main chancel. In 1676 it was recorded that 88 people in Hawksworth were receiving communion, and there were six Dissenters.

The south wall of the tower bears the reset arch of a tympanum, carved with alternating rosettes and wheels in roundels, enclosing a row of zigzag carving. The centre shows a cross with splayed ends with a raised band just before the splay. At the top is an angel on the right and an Agnus Dei (Lamb of God) on the left, both set in roundels. The shaft of the cross shows two standing figures. Down the left-hand side of the cross and below is a Latin inscription, which translates: "Walter and his spouse Cecelina had this church made in honour of our Lord and of Saint Mary the Virgin and all God's saints likewise." This tympanum was dated by Nikolaus Pevsner to the 12th century.

The nave was rebuilt in 1812–1813, the north aisle in 1837, and the chancel in 1851. The stained glass of the east window, by William Wailes, also dates from 1851. A new west door with a stone arch was added in 1866. The clock and a third bell followed in 1873.

== Secular use ==
Much of the church building was deconsecrated in 1989 and now serves as Hawksworth Community Hall. Urgent major repairs were undertaken in 2000, 2005 and 2012.

== See also ==
- Grade II* listed buildings in Nottinghamshire
- Listed buildings in Hawksworth, Nottinghamshire

== Gallery ==
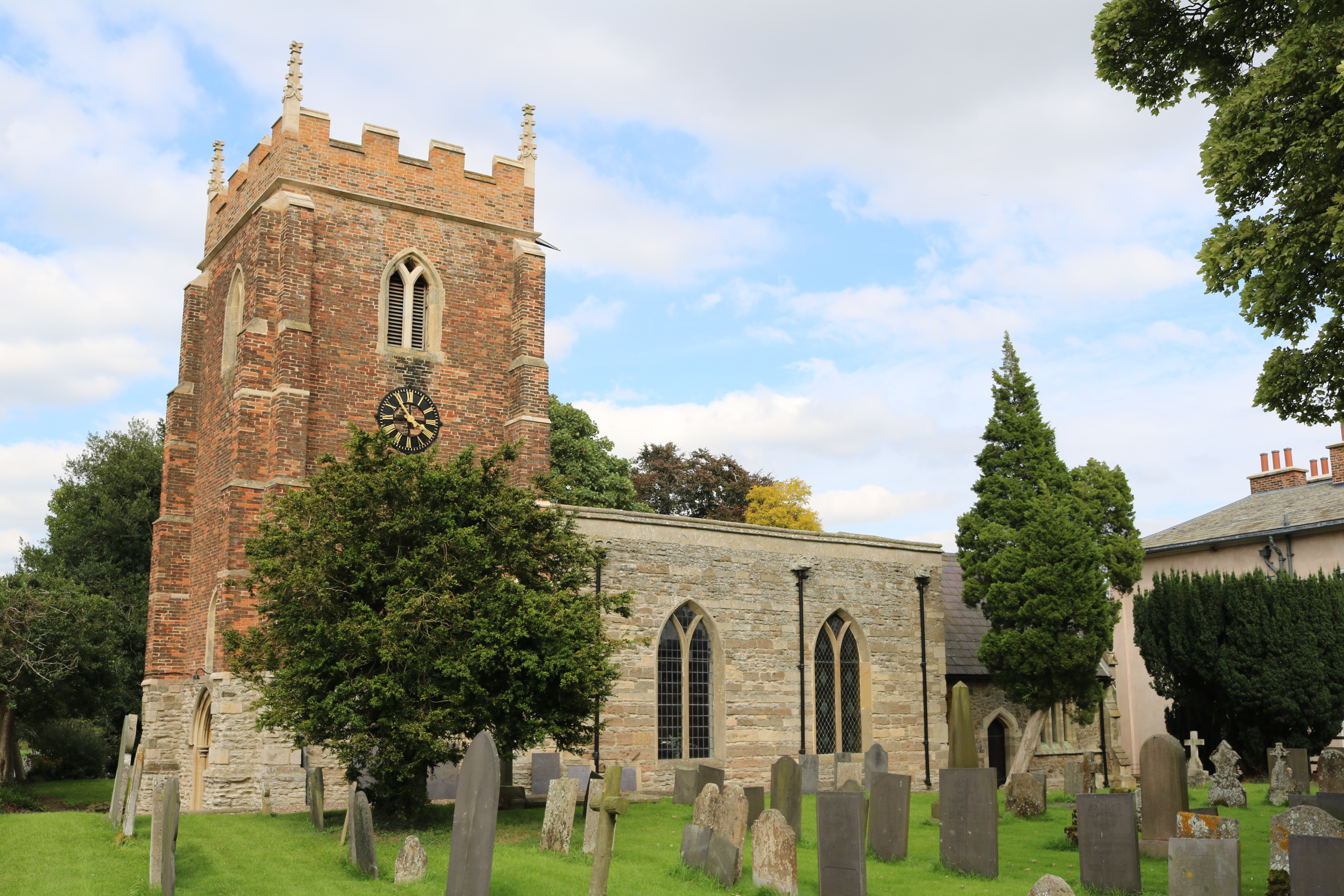
Church of St Mary and All Saints

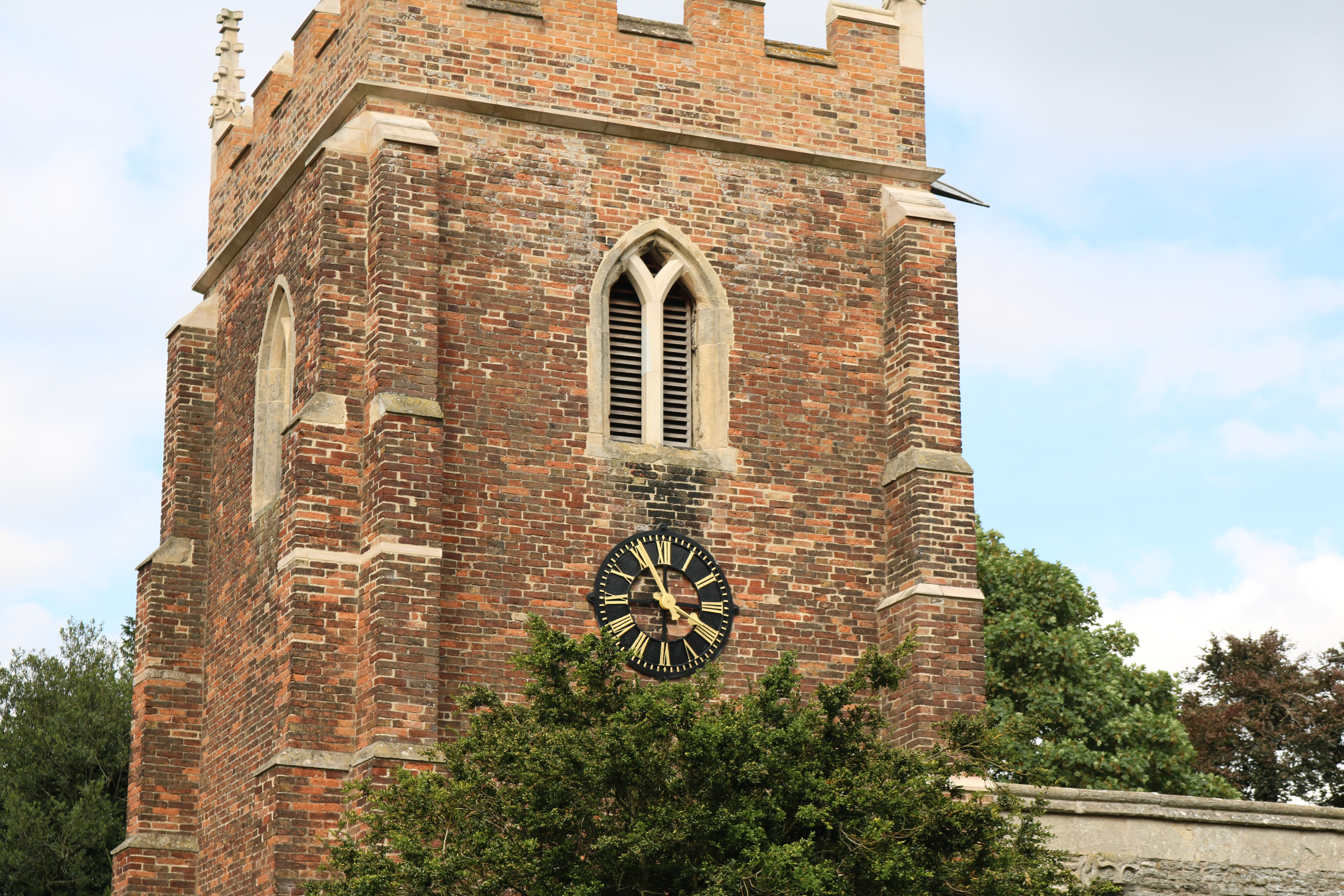
The clock face on the southern side of the west tower at the Church of St Mary and All Saints

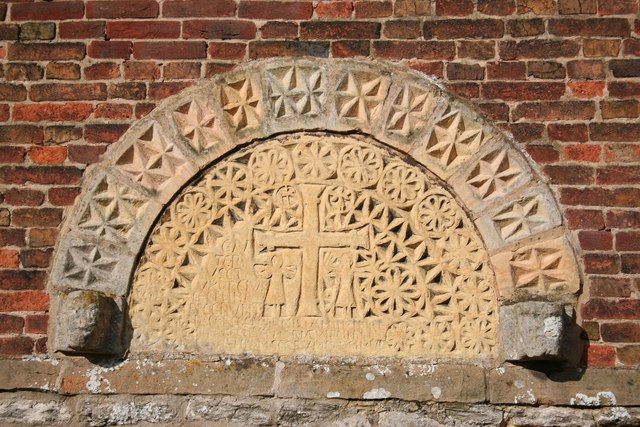
The tympanum at the Church of St Mary and All Saints
