= St Helena's Church, Thoroton =

Nottinghamshire Anglican church

Coordinates: 52°58′29″N 00°51′46″W

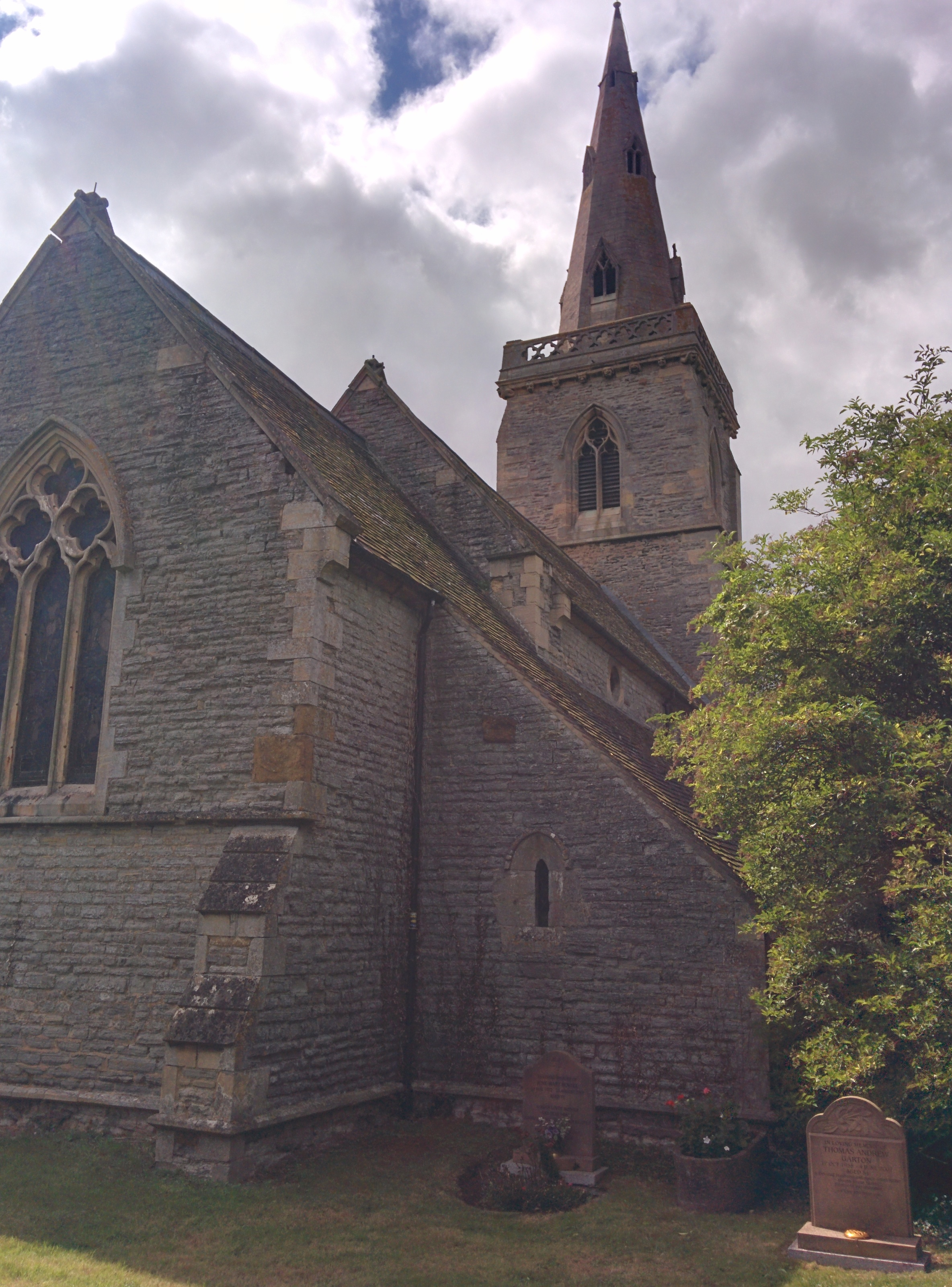
- St Helena's Church, Thoroton
- Denomination: Church of England
- Website: The Cranmer Group

History
- Dedication: St. Helena

Administration
- Province: York
- Diocese: Southwell and Nottingham
- Parish: Thoroton

Clergy
- Vicar: The Revd Tim Chambers

St Helena's Church, Thoroton is the Church of England parish church of Thoroton, Nottinghamshire, England. The building is Grade I listed by the Department for Digital, Culture, Media and Sport as of outstanding architectural interest.

== Heritage ==
The church is medieval – fragments of the East end date back to the 11th century – although it was restored in 1868–1869 by the architect John Henry Hakewill, son of Henry Hakewill. This involved rebuilding the chancel and re-roofing and re-seating the church. The 14th-century tower has a restored corbel table with masks and four gargoyles and an octagonal spire. Most of the stained glass dates from 1869. The vestry has been converted into a chapel. The plain round font there has a restored 14th-century base.

The dedication (earlier to "St Helen") is to St Helena of Constantinople, mother of the first Christian Roman Emperor, Constantine. She was reputed to have found the True Cross while on a pilgrimage to the Holy Land in AD 326.

In the 17th and 18th centuries the church and its parish formed a chapelry of Orston. The pre-restoration church was described architecturally by a visitor, Sir Stephen Glynne, on 12 April 1866, when it was in disrepair. The prompting for the restoration came on 27 April 1868, when it was badly damaged by lightning.

The church has a Latin slate tablet in memory of Gulielmi (i. e. William) Barrett (died 1760) and a marble war-memorial tablet (1919).

== Parish structure ==
The church is in the Cranmer Group of parishes, which also includes St Thomas's Church, Aslockton, the Church of St Mary and All Saints, Hawksworth, St Mary's Church, Orston, the Church of St John of Beverley, Scarrington, and the Church of St John of Beverley, Whatton. Thoroton has a service at 9 am (Holy Communion or Matins) on the second Sunday of the month.

== See also ==
- Grade I listed buildings in Nottinghamshire
- Listed buildings in Thoroton
