= Thomas Shipman =

British poet

Thomas Shipman (born 1632, died 1680) was an English poet. A collection of around 200 of his poems was published posthumously in 1683, edited by his friend Thomas Flatman. More recently his poem The Resolute Courtier was included in The Centuries' Poetry 2 - Donne to Dryden.

He was very much of his time:

Prithee, say aye or no;
If thou'lt not have me, tell me so;
I cannot stay,
Nor will I wait upon
A smile or frown.
If thou wilt have me, say;
Then I am thine, or else I am mine own.

Shipman was born in Scarrington near Newark-on-Trent and educated at St John's College, Cambridge. His work shows him to have been an outspoken royalist, but he managed to keep his family estate intact between the execution of Charles I in 1649 and the Stuart restoration in 1660 by retiring from public life. In his preface to Carolina Flatman comments: "In the Calamities of the last Rebellion he was no small Sharer, the Iniquity of the Times having no power to shock his Loyalty, he very cheerfully underwent the Tryals of unhappy Virtue."

Shipman's heroic tragedy Henry the Third of France was performed at the Theatre Royal, Drury Lane in 1678. It was written to support the Duke of Monmouth at a time when anti-Catholic hysteria gripped the country. (Monmouth later led the disastrous Monmouth Rebellion in an effort to depose his Catholic uncle James II and was executed in 1685.) In his preface to Carolina Flatman comments again: "If there be any thing meaner than may be expected from so polite a Pen, thy Candor must attribute it either to the hasty Efforts of his younger, or the too ponderous and over-pow'ring Confusions which the Rebellion imprinted on his riper Years."

Shipman died at Scarrington, where he was buried on 15 October 1680.
