= Shelton, Nottinghamshire =

Village and civil parish in Nottinghamshire, England

Coordinates: 53.00°N 0.84°W

Shelton
- Village and civil parish
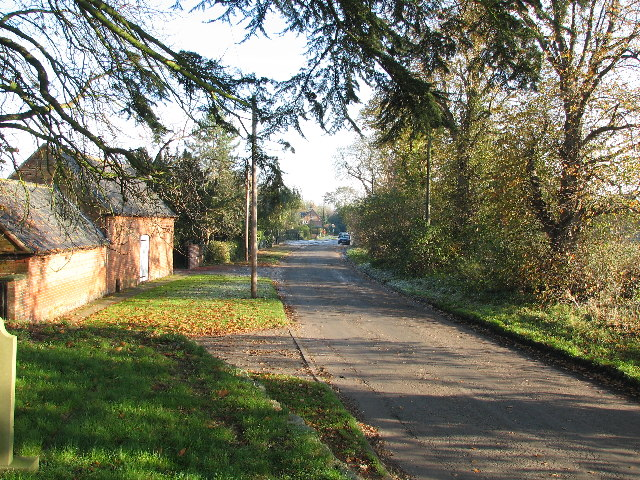
- Main Street, Shelton

- Location within Nottinghamshire
- Interactive map of Shelton
- Area: 1.33 sq mi (3.4 km^{2})
- Population: 135 (2021)
  - Density: 102/sq mi (39/km^{2})
- OS grid reference: SK 779446
  - London: 105 mi (169 km) SSE
- District: Rushcliffe
- Shire county: Nottinghamshire
- Region: East Midlands
- Country: England
- Sovereign state: United Kingdom
- Post town: NEWARK
- Postcode district: NG23
- Dialling code: 01636 / 01949
- Police: Nottinghamshire
- Fire: Nottinghamshire
- Ambulance: East Midlands
- UK Parliament: Rushcliffe

Shelton is an English village and civil parish in the Rushcliffe borough of Nottinghamshire. According to the 2001 census, Shelton had a population of 107. At the 2011 census, the statistics for Shelton included Sibthorpe, and the total population was 307. For the 2021 census, Shelton alone reported 135 residents. The village lies 8 miles (13 km) south of Newark-on-Trent, on the north side of the River Smite, near where it joins the River Devon. It has no parish council, only a parish meeting.

== Heritage ==
The parish church of St Mary is Norman. The west tower was removed in 1837 and replaced with a bellcote. It has a Saxon cross shaft with interlace work. Shelton Hall to the west of the church dates from the late 18th century.

== Transport ==
The village is served by twice-weekly Nottsbus Connect buses (Tuesday and Thursday) between Bottesford, Bingham and Lowdham. The nearest railway station is at Bottesford (5.5 miles/9 km), with services between Nottingham and Grantham or Skegness.
