= Thoroton =

Village and civil parish in Nottinghamshire, England

Coordinates: 53.0°N 0.86°W

- Village and civil parish
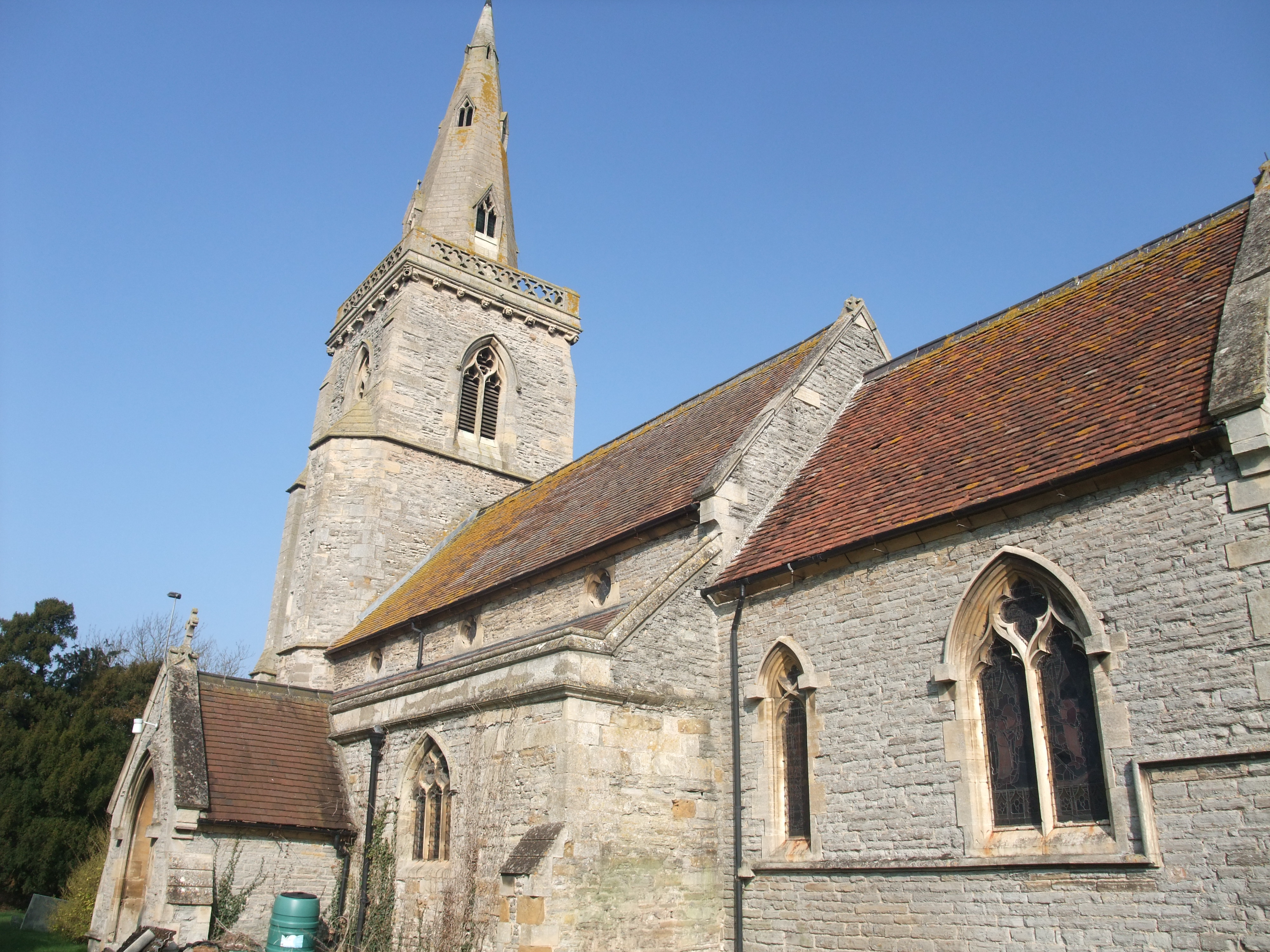
- St Helena’s Church

- Location within Nottinghamshire
- Interactive map of Thoroton
- Area: 1.32 sq mi (3.4 km^{2})
- Population: 130 (2021)
  - Density: 98/sq mi (38/km^{2})
- OS grid reference: SK 764425
  - London: 105 mi (169 km) SSE
- District: Rushcliffe
- Shire county: Nottinghamshire
- Region: East Midlands
- Country: England
- Sovereign state: United Kingdom
- Post town: NOTTINGHAM
- Postcode district: NG13
- Dialling code: 01949
- Police: Nottinghamshire
- Fire: Nottinghamshire
- Ambulance: East Midlands
- UK Parliament: Newark

Thoroton is a small English village and civil parish in the borough of Rushcliffe, and the county of Nottinghamshire, with a population of 112 at the 2011 census, and increasing to 130 at the 2021 census. The village has conservation area status. Its Anglican parish church is a Grade I listed building.

== Geography ==
Thoroton lies along the banks of the River Smite, about 15 miles (24 km) east of Nottingham, 4 miles (6.4 km) north-east of Bingham and adjacent to Scarrington, Hawksworth, Sibthorpe, Orston and Aslockton. It is bounded by an originally Roman road, the Fosse Way – A46 – 3 miles (4.8 km) to the west, the A1 3 miles (4.8 km) to the east, and the A52 2 miles (3.2 km) further south.

Thoroton belongs under Rushcliffe Borough Council. The village is part of the Rushcliffe constituency in the House of Commons.

== Heritage ==
Thoroton was granted conservation area status in 1974. It is served by the medieval Anglican St Helena's Church, which is a Grade I listed building. There is a service held once a month.

The place name seems to contain an Old Norse personal name Þurferð + tūn (Old English), an enclosure; a farmstead; a village; an estate; thus "Farm of a man called Thurferth". There are 19 such place names (a Scandinavian personal name followed by tūn ) in Nottinghamshire, all of them in the Domesday survey, and all apparently ancient villages.

Charles Falconer, Baron Falconer of Thoroton takes his name from part of his wife's name, whose family home is near Thoroton. The Falconers also own property in the village itself, which is let.

== Transport ==
Thoroton is served by buses to Bottesford, Bingham and nearby villages on Tuesdays and to Newark-on-Trent, Bottesford and nearby villages on Wednesdays.

The nearest railway station is at Aslockton (2.2 miles/3.5 km). It offers regular services between Nottingham and Grantham or Skegness.

== Amenities ==
The nearest primary school to the village is at Orston (2 miles/3.5 km). Secondary education is available in Bingham and Newark-on-Trent.

St Helena's Church has parts dating back to the 11th century. It belongs to the Cranmer group of Anglican parishes and has a service at 9 a.m. on the second Sunday of the month.

There are shopping, medical and other services at Newark-on-Trent (9 miles/14.5 km), Bingham (6 miles/10 km) and Bottesford (5 miles/8 km). Accommodation is available in Bingham and Elton on the Hill (4 miles/6.5 km).

== See also ==
- Listed buildings in Thoroton
