= St Thomas's Church, Aslockton =

Nottinghamshire Anglican church

Coordinates: 52°57′14″N 00°53′46″W

St. Thomas' Church, Aslockton
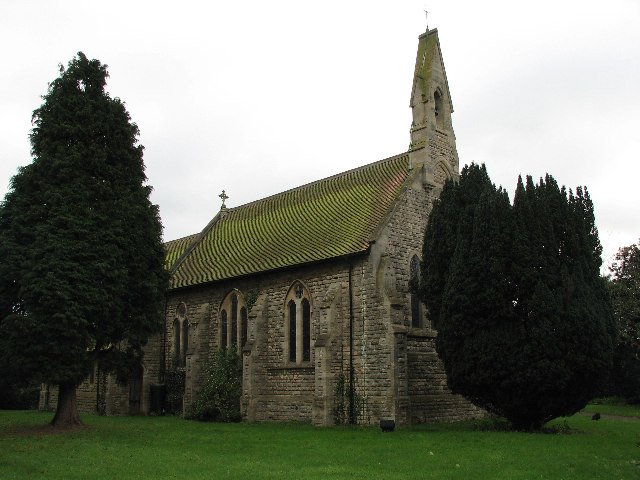
- St. Thomas' Church, Aslockton
- Denomination: Church of England
- Website: The Cranmer Group http://www.achurchnearyou.com/aslockton/

History
- Dedication: St. Thomas

Administration
- Province: York
- Diocese: Southwell and Nottingham
- Parish: Aslockton

Clergy
- Vicar: The Rev. Tim Chambers

St. Thomas' Church, Aslockton is a late 19th-century Church of England parish church in the village of Aslockton, Nottinghamshire. The church is Grade II listed by the Department for Digital, Culture, Media and Sport as a building of special architectural or historic interest.

== History ==
The church was built between 1890 and 1892 by Sir Reginald Blomfield. The National Heritage listing however states that the architect was Sir Arthur Blomfield. It is Grade II listed and was erected in memory of a former vicar of Whatton, Thomas K. Hall, who drowned in February 1890 when RMS Quetta was wrecked off Queensland on her way to Thursday Island. His mother, Mrs Sophia E. Hall, paid for the church to be built.

The Quetta window on the north wall, showing the shipwreck, was designed by Michael Stokes in 2002, as was the east window, dedicated to Cranmer, with Jesus displaying his wounded hands to Doubting Thomas. The church has a single bell in a bell cote at the west end.

== Parish structure ==
The church belongs to the Cranmer Group of parishes which consists of:

- St Thomas's Church, Aslockton
- Church of St Mary and All Saints, Hawksworth
- Church of St John of Beverley, Scarrington
- St Helena's Church, Thoroton
- Church of St John of Beverley, Whatton
- St Mary's Church, Orston

== See also ==
- Listed buildings in Aslockton
