= Church of St John of Beverley, Whatton =

Anglican church in Nottinghamshire, England

Coordinates: 52°56′57″N 00°53′36″W

Church of St John of Beverley, Whatton-in-the-Vale
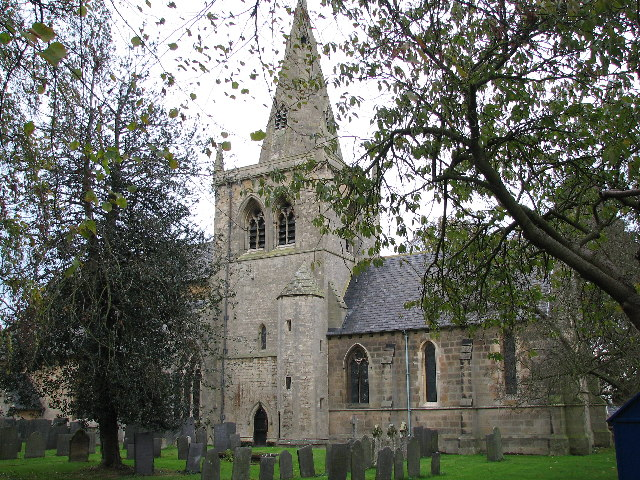
- Church of St John of Beverley, Whatton-in-the-Vale
- Denomination: Church of England
- Website: The Cranmer Group

History
- Dedication: St John of Beverley

Administration
- Province: York
- Diocese: Southwell and Nottingham
- Parish: Whatton-in-the-Vale

Clergy
- Vicar: Rev. Timothy Chambers

The Church of St John of Beverley, Whatton is a parish church in the Church of England in Whatton-in-the-Vale, Nottinghamshire, dedicated to St John of Beverley. The church is Grade II* listed by the Department for Digital, Culture, Media and Sport.

== Building ==
The church is medieval, dating from the 14th century, but little of the original survived the restorations of 1846, 1866–1867 and 1870. It consists now of a chancel rebuilt in 1846, a central tower and steeple rebuilt in 1870, and a nave with north and south aisles and north and south porches. The only remaining Romanesque work is the former south transept arch of the tower, which was moved to the north side during the 19th-century restoration. The nave is in Early English style.

There is also a chapel dedicated to the memory of Archbishop Thomas Cranmer, who was born and raised in Aslockton, which was a chapelry of Whatton at that time. The two corbel heads in the chapel date from about 1300 and depict King David and an angel.

== Effigies and features ==
Apart from interesting architectural detail (the lower part of a now redundant newel staircase, the Decorated recess containing a statue of a former incumbent [1304–10], and a double piscina), there is a late 14th-century effigy of a Knight Templar in armour and another of a cross-legged knight of the early 14th century, and a tablet in memory of Thomas Cranmer, father of the archbishop, who was born in Aslockton in 1489.

The font dates from 1662. One of the 19th-century stained-glass windows, depicting SS. Peter and John with Jesus, was designed by the Pre-Raphaelite Edward Burne-Jones. There is a peal of eight bells, of which five bells were cast by Henry Oldfield of Nottingham in 1590 and 1618. An early clock was installed in 1683 by Richard Roe. This was replaced in 1910.

== Parish status ==
The church belongs to the Cranmer Group of parishes, which consists of:

- St Thomas's Church, Aslockton
- Church of St Mary and All Saints, Hawksworth
- Church of St John of Beverley, Scarrington
- St Helena's Church, Thoroton
- Church of St John of Beverley, Whatton
- St Mary's Church, Orston

== See also ==
- Grade II* listed buildings in Nottinghamshire
- Listed buildings in Whatton-in-the-Vale
