= Church of St John of Beverley, Scarrington =

Anglican church in Nottinghamshire, England

Coordinates: 52°58′00″N 00°54′25″W

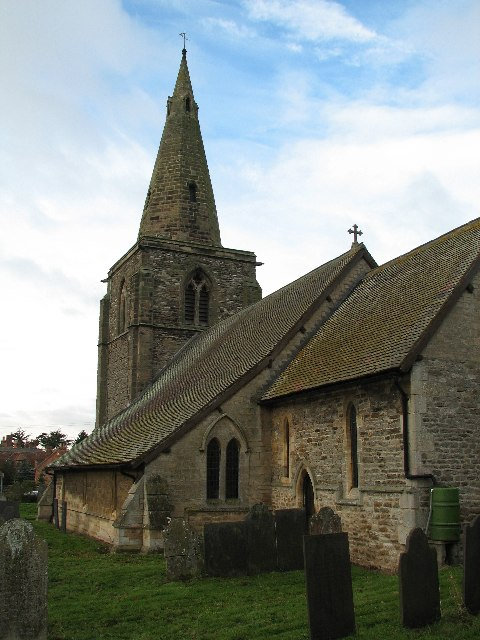
- Church of St John of Beverley, Scarrington
- Denomination: Church of England
- Website: Scarrington Parish Church

History
- Dedication: St John of Beverley

Administration
- Province: York
- Diocese: Southwell and Nottingham
- Parish: Scarrington

Clergy
- Vicar: Rev. Tim Chambers

The Church of St John of Beverley is a 13th-century parish church of the Church of England, in the village of Scarrington, Nottinghamshire. It has been Grade I listed by the Department for Digital, Culture, Media and Sport.

== History ==
The medieval church, dating from the 13th century, was restored by J. H. Hakewill in 1867–1869. It was a chapelry of St Mary's at Orston until 1867, and then formed a new parish under a vicar with Aslockton until 1910, when it was joined with Hawksworth, while Aslockton was returned to an earlier affiliation to Whatton.

St John of Beverley's was described in 1866 as having a tower and spire and a nave and chancel. The south aisle had been removed in 1802 and the south arcade walled up with bricks. The 1867 restoration included a new south aisle. The vestry was also added in the 19th century, as were the chancel arch and reredos. The small Restoration-period font replaced one removed by the Puritans. The bowl of another font found later, now placed at the east end of the south aisle, may or may not be the original one.

== Parish structure ==
The church belongs to the Diocese of Southwell and Nottingham as one of the Cranmer Group of parishes, which includes:

- St Thomas's Church, Aslockton
- Church of St Mary and All Saints, Hawksworth
- St Helena's Church, Thoroton
- Church of St John of Beverley, Whatton
- St Mary's Church, Orston

The incumbent of the group is Rev. Tim Chambers.

== See also ==
- Grade I listed buildings in Nottinghamshire
- Listed buildings in Scarrington
