= Toot Hill School =

Location
- The Banks; Bingham, Nottinghamshire, NG13 8BL; England; 52.948884°N 0.954427°W

Information
- Type: Academy
- Trust: Nova Education Trust
- Department for Education URN: 136878 Tables
- Ofsted: Reports
- Executive headteacher: Sandy Paley
- Head teacher: Chris Eardley
- Age: 11 to 18
- Website: http://www.toothillschool.co.uk/

Toot Hill School is a coeducational secondary school and sixth form, located in Bingham in the English county of Nottinghamshire, built in 1969. The school is a member of Nova Education Trust.

== History ==
=== 1989 arson attack ===
At 10 on 8 August 1989, an arson attack destroyed six classrooms in a single-storey part of the school. Firemen from Bingham and West Bridgford extinguished the fire in half an hour. It was investigated by West Bridgford CID, and Detective Superintendent Jim Smith and Detective Inspector Dave Blacknall.

== Notable alumni ==
- Brent Di Cesare (Mark Goldbridge) - YouTuber
- Joe Heyes - professional rugby union player for Leicester Tigers and England Rugby
- Daniel Taylor - British football journalist
- Chris Urbanowicz - guitarist with Editors
