= Aslockton railway station =

Railway station in Nottinghamshire, England

Coordinates: 52°57′06″N 0°53′55″W

Aslockton
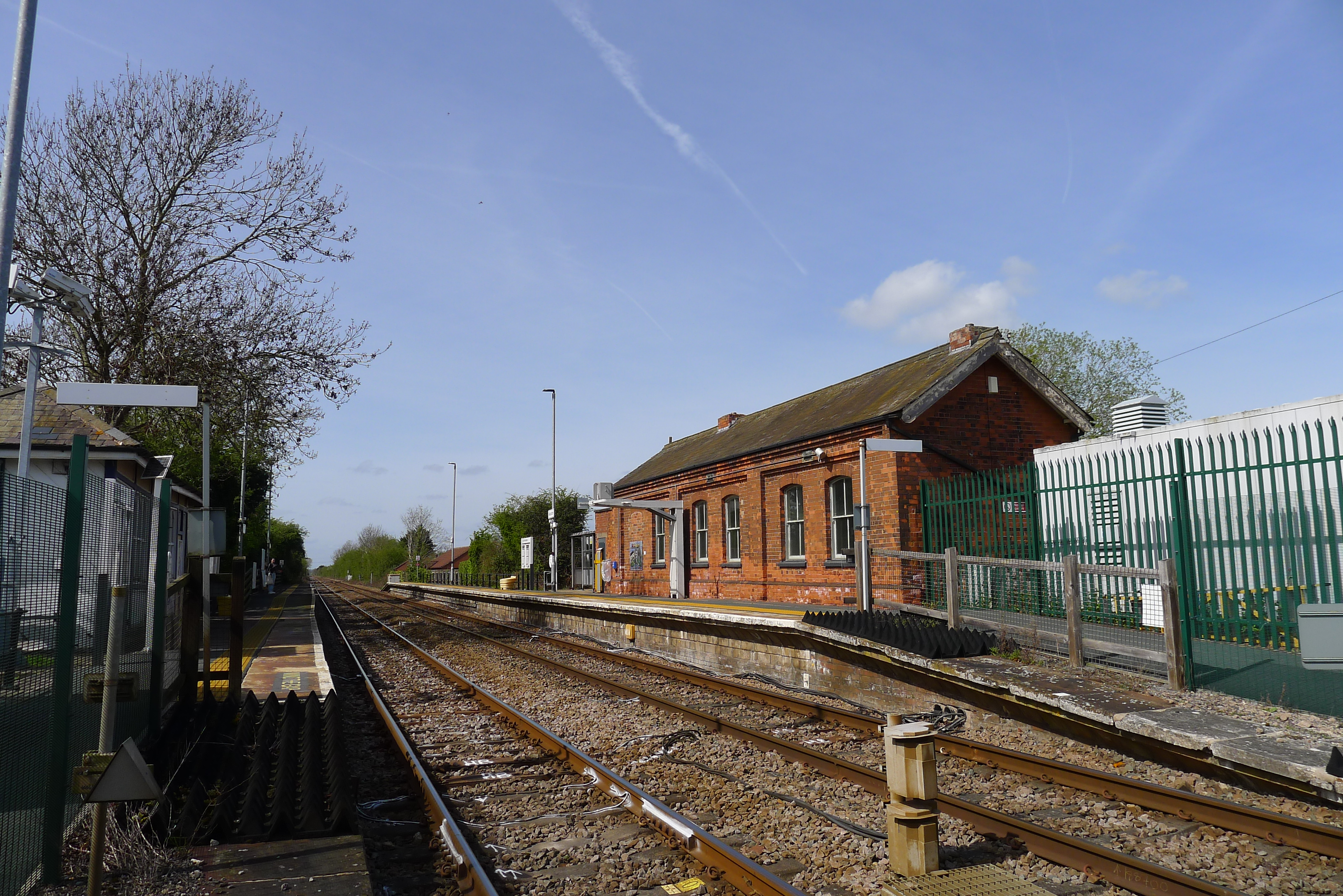
- Aslockton station in 2026

General information
- Location: Aslockton, Rushcliffe; England
- Grid reference: SK705401
- Manager: East Midlands Railway
- Platforms: 2

Other information
- Station code: ALK
- Classification: DfT category F2

History
- Opened: 15 July 1850
- Original company: Ambergate, Nottingham, Boston and Eastern Junction Railway
- Pre-grouping: Great Northern Railway
- Post-grouping: London and North Eastern Railway

Passengers
- 2021/22: ▲15,914
- 2022/23: ▲23,472
- 2023/24: ▼23,194
- 2024/25: ▲23,218
- 2025/26: ▲28,142
Location
Notes
- Passenger statistics from the Office of Rail and Road

Aslockton railway station serves the English villages of Aslockton and Whatton-in-the-Vale in Nottinghamshire. It also draws passengers from other nearby villages. It is 10 miles (17 km) east of Nottingham on the Nottingham–Skegness Line.

== History ==
Passenger services from Aslockton started on 15 July 1850, when the Ambergate, Nottingham, Boston and Eastern Junction Railway opened its extension from Nottingham to Grantham. This was taken over by the Great Northern Railway. The station building designed by Thomas Chambers Hine was opened by the Great Northern Railway in 1857.

On 12 October 1868 a goods train that left Nottingham at 4.15 am split near Aslockton station when one of the coupling chains broke. The driver shunted on to the down line, and while it got back onto the up line, a goods train from Grantham ran into it. The driver of the Grantham train, Smalley Hutchinson, was killed and its fireman severely injured.

On 31 December 1904, George Skillington, aged 78, was killed on the line at Aslockton by a light engine.

The station became part of the London and North Eastern Railway under the Grouping of 1923.

On 23 July 1933 an excursion train from Skegness to Nottingham crashed through the level crossing gates at Aslockton. On 1 August 1937, a nine-year-old boy, Ernest Love of Sneinton, Nottingham, fell from a Nottingham to Mablethorpe excursion train at Aslockton and was killed.

The station passed to the Eastern Region of British Railways on nationalisation in 1948.

From 7 January 1963 passenger steam trains between Grantham, Bottesford, Elton and Orston, Aslockton, Bingham, Radcliffe-on-Trent, Netherfield and Colwick, Nottingham London-road (High Level) and Nottingham (Victoria) were replaced with diesel multiple-unit trains.

When sectorisation was introduced in the 1980s, the station was served by Regional Railways until the Privatisation of British Railways. The station is now managed by East Midlands Railway.

=== Stationmasters ===
- David Bennett Fenn c. 1851
- Mr. Buffam c. 1857
- Edwin Frost c. 1861
- Alfred Andrews c. 1868
- Robert A. Theobald c. 1871
- Henry Chapman c. 1880
- John George Eyre c. 1881
- Richard H. Simpson c. 1891
- Albert Edward Hyde 1901 – c. 1905
- William Poole 1931–1933 (formerly stationmaster at Cotham)
- Arthur Gilbert 1933 – c. 1950 (formerly stationmaster at Elton and Orston)
- George Kingston from 1957 (formerly stationmaster at Scalford)

== Services ==
There are trains every hour or two hours to Nottingham and to Boston and Skegness via Grantham. There are less frequent trains to destinations such as Norwich and Liverpool Lime Street. On Sundays, there are normally three services – one to Liverpool Lime Street, one to Skegness and one to Norwich.

Preceding station	National Rail	Following station
Bingham	East Midlands Railway Nottingham-Grantham Line	Elton and Orston
	Historical railways	
Bottesford; Line and station open	Great Northern Railway; Nottingham to Grantham	Bottesford; Line and station open
Bingham; Line and station open	Great Northern Railway; Nottingham to Newark	Elton; Line and station open

== See also ==
- Listed buildings in Aslockton
