= River Devon, Nottinghamshire =

River in Nottinghamshire, United Kingdom

River Devon
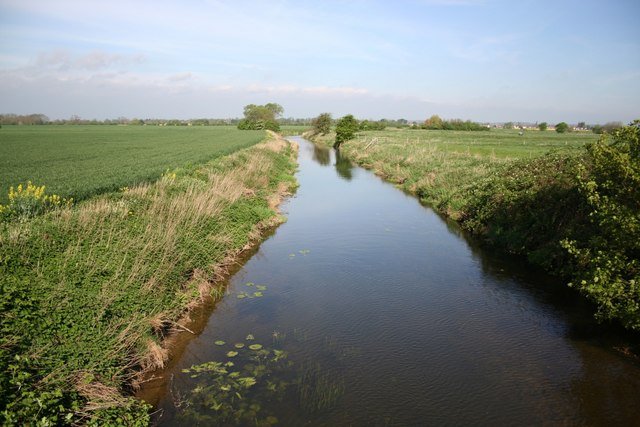
- The River Devon looking downstream from Hawton bridge

Location
- Country: England

Physical characteristics
- Source
  - location: Several springs near Eastwell, Leicestershire
  - elevation: 490 feet (150 m)
- Mouth
  - location: River Trent, Newark-on-Trent
  - elevation: 50 feet (15 m)

Basin features
- Tributaries
  - left: River Smite

The River Devon (/ˈdiːvən/ DEEV-ən) is a tributary of the River Trent, which rises in Leicestershire and joins the Trent at Newark in Nottinghamshire, England. In its upper reaches, it supplies Knipton Reservoir, which was built to supply water to the Grantham Canal, and Belvoir Lakes, designed by Capability Brown. It passes under the Grantham Canal, and then through Bottesford, where it is spanned by five railway bridges, only one of which is still used for its original purpose. On the outskirts of Newark, it passes by two Civil War structures, and just before it joins the Trent it becomes navigable, with a marina located on the west bank. Its name is pronounced /ˈdiːvən/, unlike the unrelated county of Devon (/ˈdɛvən/).

== Hydrology ==
The river has a catchment of 109.8 square miles (284 km^{2}) and had an average flow of 29.8 million gallons (135.6 Megalitres) per day, measured at the gauging station in Cotham, near the mouth. However, the gauging station was closed in 1978, due to doubts about the reliability of its measurements, and there is currently no gauging station on the river. The catchment receives 23.28 inches (591 mm) of rainfall in an average year.

== Course ==
The river rises as a series of springs and streams near the villages of Eastwell, Bottesford (Leics) Eaton in north-east Leicestershire, close to the 490-foot (150 m) contour, and flows generally northwards. Passing close to Branston, it flows into Knipton reservoir, built in the 1790s to supply the Grantham Canal. The surface area of the reservoir is 52 acres (21 ha), and it feeds the canal through a channel, called The Carrier, which has open sections and runs through a tunnel for about 1 mile (1.6 km). In 2006, British Waterways completed a refurbishment programme on the dam and spillway which cost £170,000. The village of Knipton is a little further to the north, on the eastern bank of the river. An unnamed tributary flows through the village to join the river, after which it enters woodland, where it is joined by a stream flowing eastwards from a small lake called Frog Hollow. Belvoir upper lake and Belvoir lower lake come next, each covering 12 acres (4.9 ha) and created by the landscape architect Capability Brown in the grounds of the Belvoir Castle estate. They are used for coarse fishing. Between them, an early 19th-century bridge with five arches and long retaining walls, built from ironstone and limestone, acts as a weir. After the lakes, the river passes to the east of Woolsthorpe-by-Belvoir and the hamlet of Stenwith, to flow under the Grantham Canal in a conduit. By this time it is below the 160-foot (49 m) contour. The county border between Leicestershire and Lincolnshire follows the course of the river for a short distance near the bottom lake, and beyond Woolsthorpe, the river is in Lincolnshire.

Passing back into Leicestershire, it flows through Muston and Bottesford, where there are a number of bridges. At the end of Church Street, Fleming's bridge is a double-arched grade II listed medieval bridge, now just used by pedestrians, which was built for Samuel Fleming, who was rector in the village between 1581 and 1620. At Devon Lane, there is a ford, besides which stands a single-arched brick bridge, with two holes passing through the spandrels, and iron railings in the centre of the parapet. It was built in the early 19th century. Beyond the village, the river is crossed by four railway bridges, only one of which is still in use, carrying the line from Grantham to Nottingham. A fifth bridge, located in fields to the north of the village, consisting of three brick arches, carried the Newark to Leicester railway line over the river. It was opened in 1860, and ceased to be used for railway traffic in 1960. The centre arch collapsed after heavy rain in 2007, and the whole structure has been replaced by a single steel span, resting on the remains of two of the piers.

The river again forms the county border, until it reaches Staunton in the Vale, which is in Nottinghamshire. The Winter Beck joins the west bank, as does the River Smite soon afterwards. The river passes Cotham which lies to the east, and runs close to a Civil War redoubt at Hawton, to arrive at the outskirts of Newark-on-Trent. Here it passes another civil war defence, the Queen's Sconce, built in 1644 at a strategic point overlooking the Devon, the Trent and the Great North Road. The site was bought by Newark Urban Council in 1912, and formed part of Devon Park, which has since been extended by further acquisitions of land. Crossing under the B6166, which follows the course of the Fosse Way Roman road at this point, the Devon joins the River Trent. Below the bridge, the river is used for moorings, and there is a marina on the western bank. The mouth is below the 50-foot (15 m) contour.

== Water Quality ==
The Environment Agency measure water quality of the river systems in England. Each is given an overall ecological status, which may be one of five levels: high, good, moderate, poor and bad. There are several components that are used to determine this, including biological status, which looks at the quantity and varieties of invertebrates, angiosperms and fish, and chemical status, which compares the concentrations of various chemicals against known safe concentrations. Chemical status is rated good or fail.

The water quality of the Devon was as follows in 2019. Data for the middle section covers a large section of the River Smite and a small section of the Devon after the two rivers have joined. Reasons for the quality being less than good include sewage discharge for most of the river, and physical modification of the channel and poor nutrient management on adjacent agricultural land on the upper sections.

Section	Ecological Status	Chemical Status	Length	Catchment
Devon from Source to Smite	Moderate	Fail	17.2 miles (27.7 km)	30.78 square miles (79.7 km^{2})
Smite / Devon from Stroom Dyke to Cotham	Moderate	Fail	10.6 miles (17.1 km)	17.72 square miles (45.9 km^{2})
Devon from Cotham to Trent	Poor	Fail	16.0 miles (25.7 km)	9.97 square miles (25.8 km^{2})

Like most rivers in the UK, the chemical status changed from good to fail in 2019, due to the presence of polybrominated diphenyl ethers (PBDE) and mercury compounds, neither of which had previously been included in the assessment. However the ecological status of the upper river improved from poor to moderate, while the lower river deteriorated from moderate to poor.

== Points of interest ==
Point	Coordinates (Links to map resources)	OS Grid Ref	Notes
Jn with River Trent, Newark	53.0702°N 0.8216°W	SK790531	mouth
Hawton Bridge	53.0507°N 0.8284°W	SK786510	by Civil War Redoubt
Jn with River Smite	52.9973°N 0.8236°W	SK790450	
Jn with Winter Beck	52.9787°N 0.8016°W	SK805430	by Staunton Hall
Rectory Lane Bridge, Bottesford	52.9435°N 0.8011°W	SK806391	
Grantham Canal aqueduct	52.9202°N 0.7558°W	SK837365	
Belvoir Lower Lake	52.8896°N 0.7661°W	SK831331	
Knipton Reservoir	52.8677°N 0.7855°W	SK818307	
Spring at Eastwell	52.8488°N 0.8473°W	SK777285	source

== Bibliography ==
- Hadfield, Charles (1970). The Canals of the East Midlands. David and Charles. ISBN 978-0-7153-4871-0.
- Lycett Green, Candida (2009). Unwrecked England. Oldie Publications. ISBN 978-1-901170-10-8.
- Marsh, T J; Hannaford, J (2008). UK Hydrometric Register. Hydrological data UK series (PDF). Centre for Ecology & Hydrology. Archived from the original (PDF) on 31 October 2014.
- Topps, Peggy (20 February 2007). "Bottesford Bridges". Bottesford Living History. Archived from the original on 21 December 2018.
