= St James' Church, Normanton =

Church in Normanton on Soar, Nottinghamshire

Parish Church of Saint James
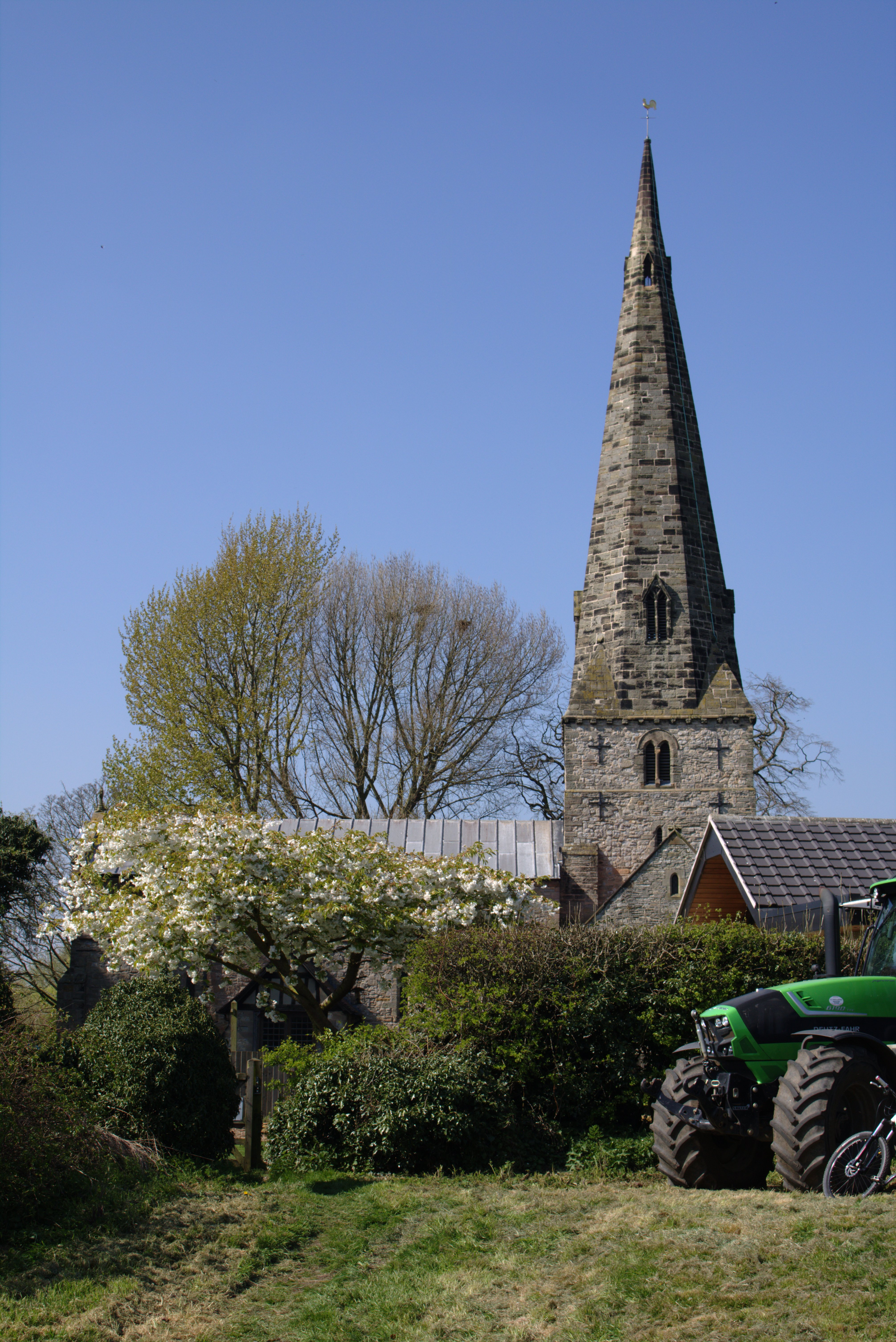
- The church from the neighbouring Ferry Field
- Parish Church of Saint James
- 52.8013°N 1.232°W
- Location: Main Street, Normanton
- Denomination: Church of England

History
- Status: parish church
- Dedication: Saint James

Architecture
- Functional status: active
- Heritage designation: Grade I Listed building
- Designated: 13 October 1966

Administration
- Province: York
- Diocese: Southwell and Nottingham
- Parish: Normanton on Soar

The Church of St. James is a parish church in the village of Normanton on Soar, Nottinghamshire. The Church was designated as a Grade I listed building on 13 October 1966, for being "of exceptional interest".

== Description ==
=== Setting ===
The medieval Grade I Listed church, Church of St. James, was built in the 13th century. It is located in the south of the village on Main Street and is situated on the east bank of the River Soar (which is the county boundary with Leicestershire). In April 2014 work was completed rebuilding and re-pointing the spire. Due to its location, the Church was traditionally known as "The Boatman's Church"; steps lead down from the churchyard to a small mooring platform on the river.

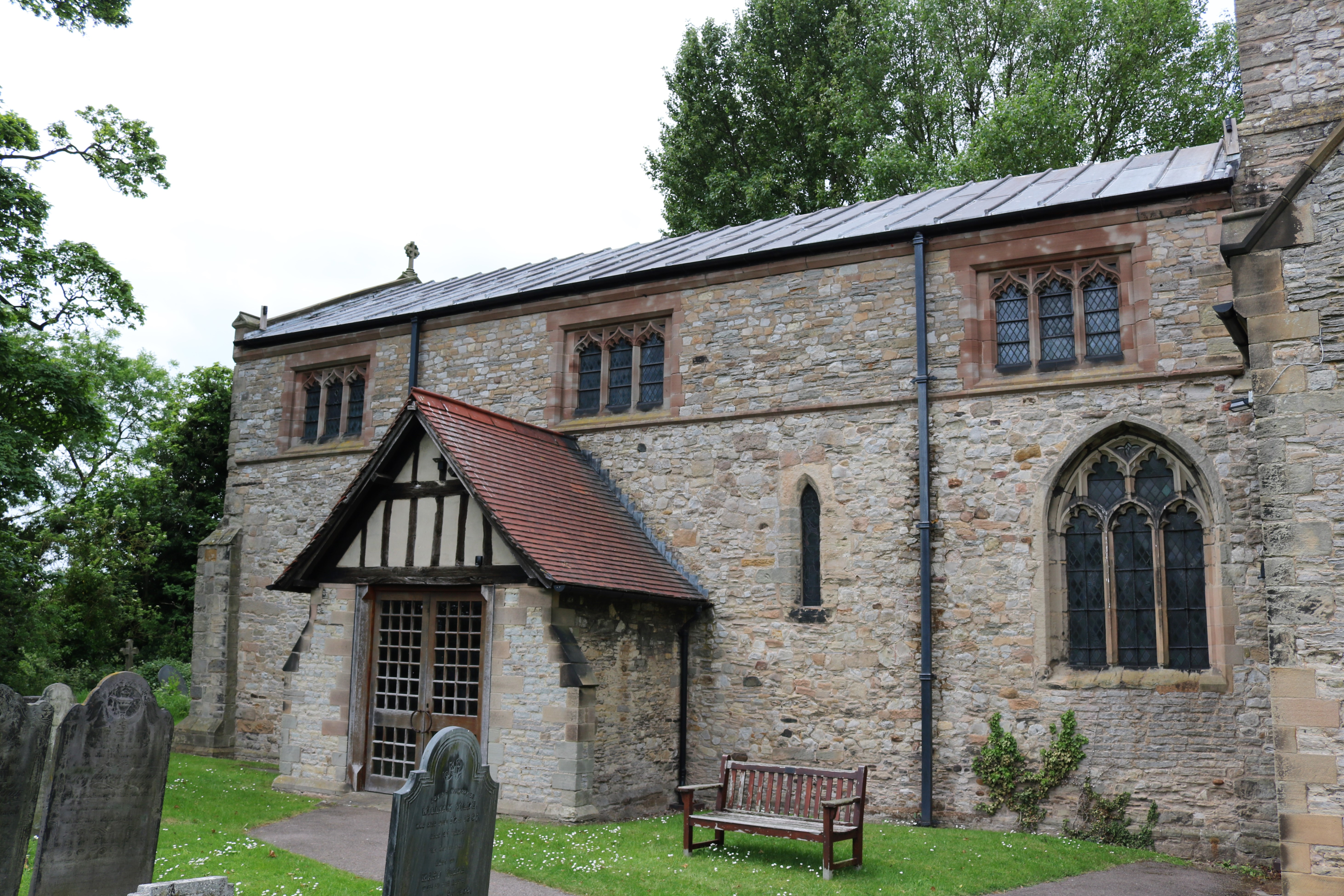
The nave of St. James', noted for its 15th century raised shallow roof

=== The current benefice ===
In 1954 the Diocese decided that the parish was too small for a full-time rector, and so it was placed under a priest-in-charge. In 1991 the parish was joined with Sutton Bonington creating a united benefice. The current priest-in-charge, Rev. Michale J Brock, is also the priest in charge of the neighbouring parish of Sutton Bonington.

== Heritage ==
=== Overview ===
St. James' Church is a Grade I Listed medieval church built in the 13th century. Although a church is not mentioned in the Domesday Survey of 1086, Rev. A. Baylay concludes that "the enumeration of churches in the Domesday Survey was far from complete".

The church has a cruciform plan with a central tower. The original section of the church represents an Early English style of architecture. In 1889 the church was restored using designs by Mr. Weatherley. The cost of the 1889 restoration totalled £2020.

It is believed that the church was originally dedicated to the Blessed Virgin Mary; however, the church was later rededicated to St James.

=== Interior ===
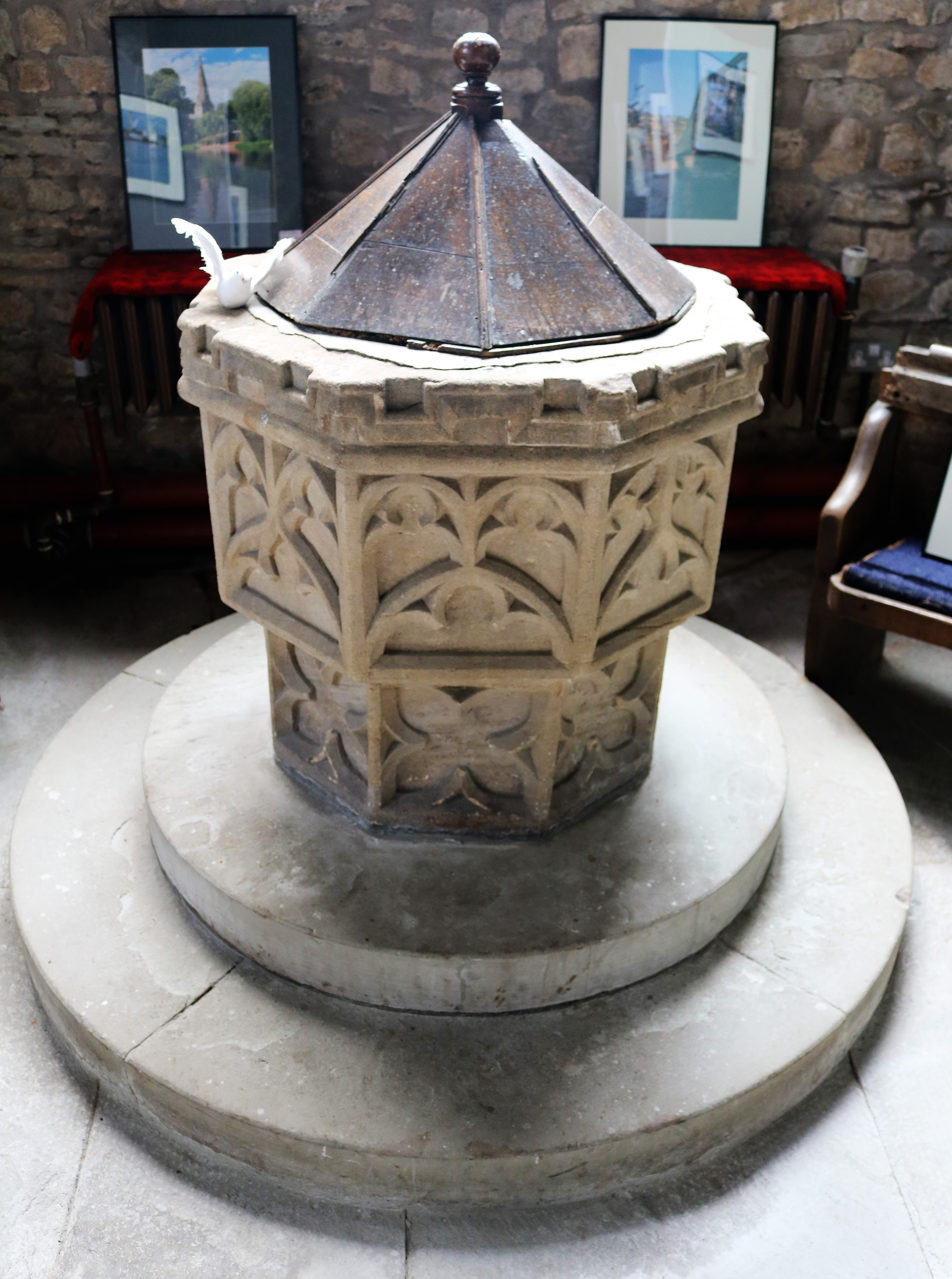
The font located at the rear of the nave

==== Fabric ====
The nave was added in the 13th century. During the 15th century the walls of the nave were raised, creating an open roof with a lower pitch, windows added later. On a summer excursion in 1910 by Rev. A. Baylay, the C.15th century timber roof was noted for being of “excellent design”, citing it is "one of the best points about the church". Rev. A. Baylay notes the unique method used in raising the roof:

The course followed was, I believe, unique. The walls were raised with a storey of timber work, to which the pendent posts of the new roof were attached. Probably this timber construction was thinner than the stone walls below, and had a set-off outside, covered with lead to keep the rain out of the tops of the walls. A trace of this can be seen on the south wall, towards its eastern end. In the 18th, or late in the 17th century, the outer sides of the timber storey have been faced with brick work (apparently not all of one date) flush with the stone walls below...

At the west end of the nave there is a large five-light window, a group of lancets. The window was constructed in the 13th century, albeit later than the original building.

==== Font ====
The font is octagonal in design with tracery panels, and was noted for being of unusual design on Rev. A Baylay's summer excursion in 1910. The font is dated from the 14th century and is constructed out of a single block of stone. During the 1889 restoration the font was repositioned from the centre of the nave to the rear of the nave, below the west window.

==== Coat of arms ====
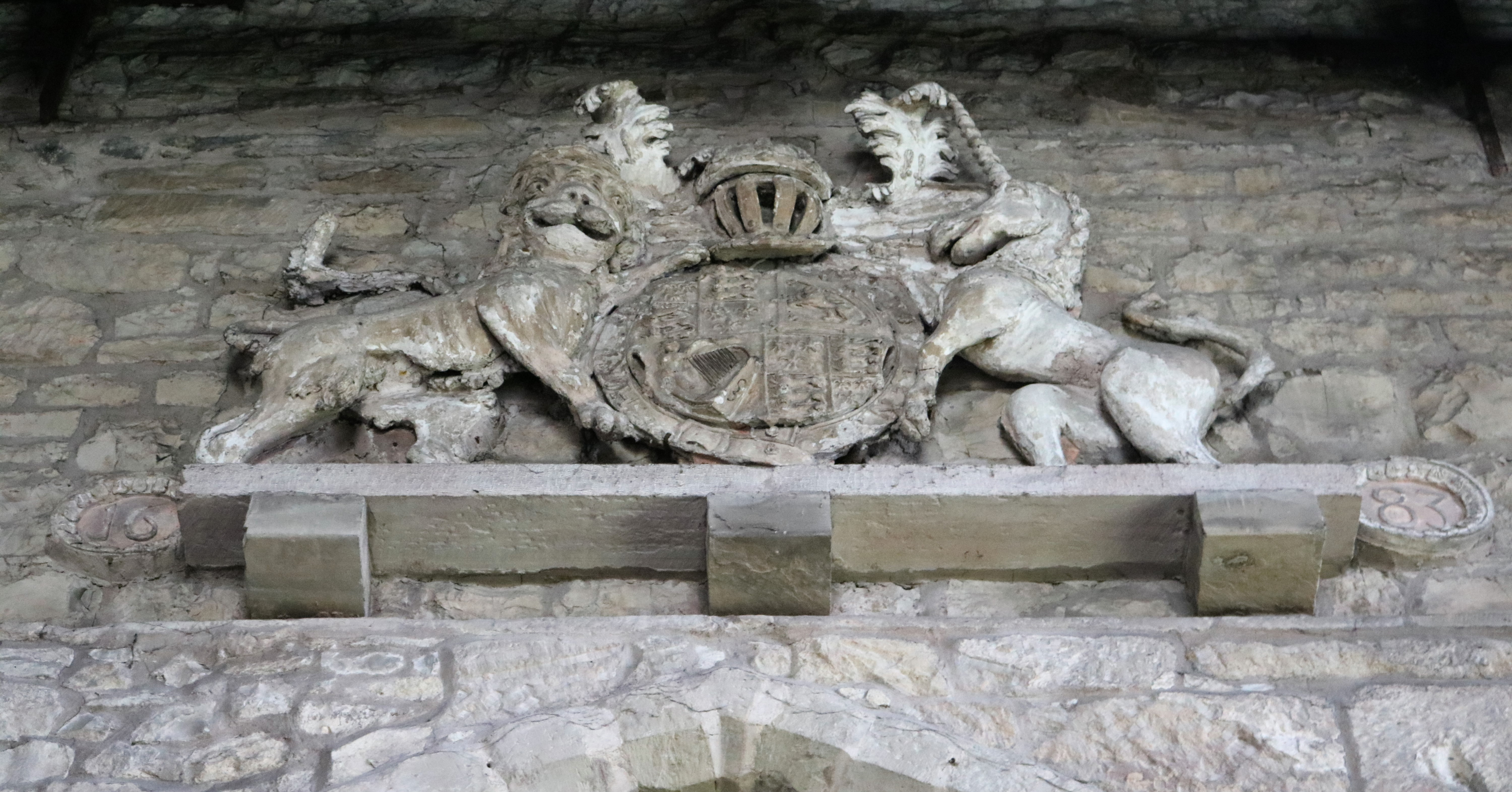
The royal coat-of-arms of Charles II located in the nave, dated 1683

Above the chancel arch, in the nave, are the royal coat-of-arms of Charles II, dated 1683, which were erected by the lord of the manor, Samuel Sanders in 1683. The coat-of-arms is constructed of plaster and is unpainted. The royal coat-of-arms are flanked on the right by the coat-of-arms of Samuel Sanders, and on the left with the coat-of-arms of his wife, Margaret. When permission was granted to restore and repair the church in 1889 the all three coat-of-arms were taken down, they were not re-installed until 1913 during which time some of the plaster was damaged.

==== Chancel ====
The chancel, where Sunday services are now held, is unusually large for its period, almost as long as the nave measuring 39'6" and 17' wide, which was possibly for accommodating visiting monks from Durham. The chancel was added in the 13th century. During the 1889 restoration the chancel roof was replaced and the timber beams were restored; a screen was also placed within the chancel before the altar, however in 1913 the screen was removed. A fire broke out in the chancel roof in 1986 requiring it to be replaced. Restoration began in 1988 and was completed in 1989, the roof was restored using timber partly salvaged from the fire.

Six former rectors are buried within the chancel (see the list of previous clergy).

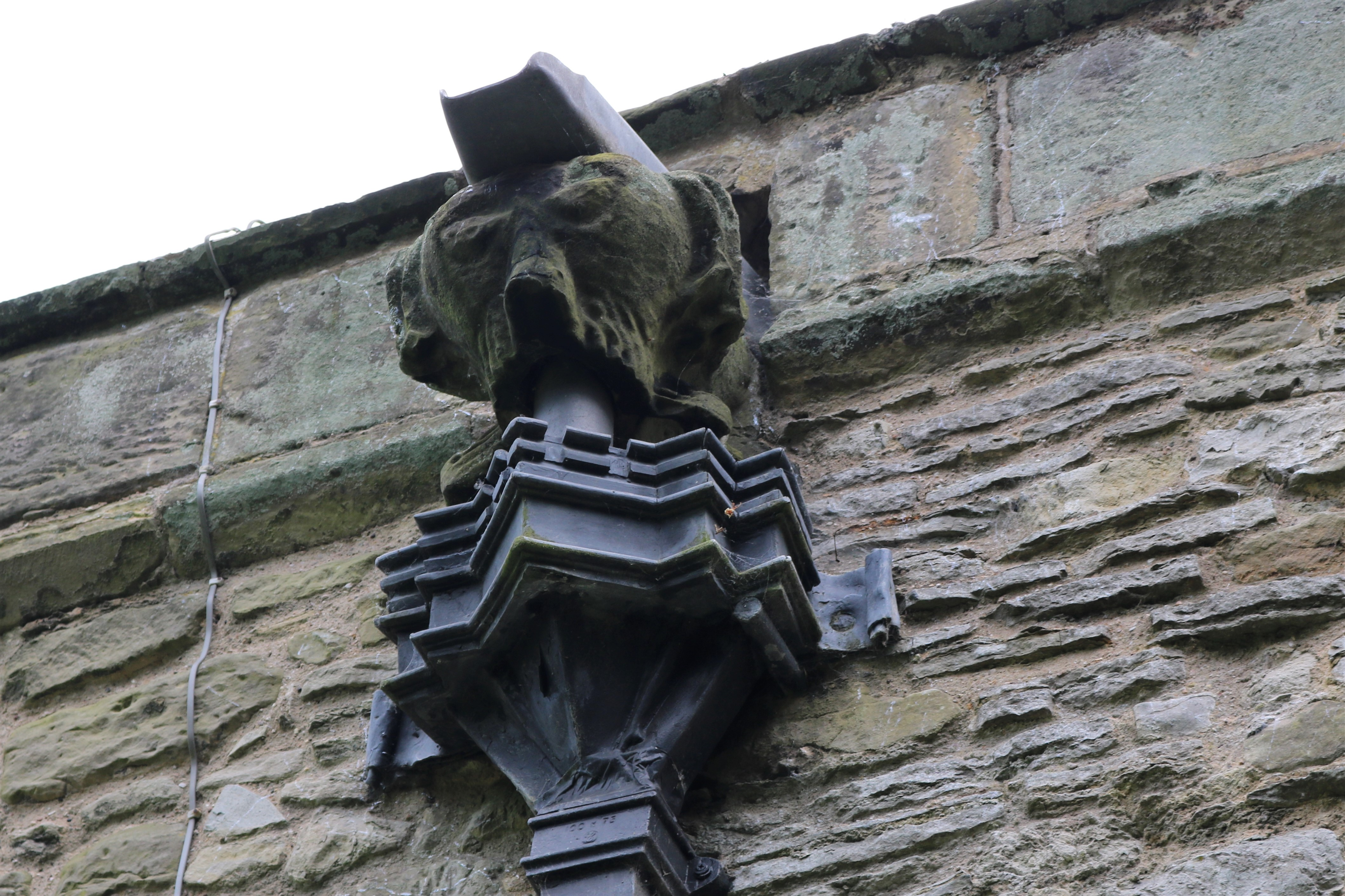
A gargoyle on the eastern part of the north chancel wall

==== Organ ====
The church currently has an Alfred Kirkland two manual pipe organ built around 1900. An earlier organ was originally located in the western end of the nave, however following the building of the north transept, during the 1889 restoration, the organ was then housed there.

=== Exterior ===
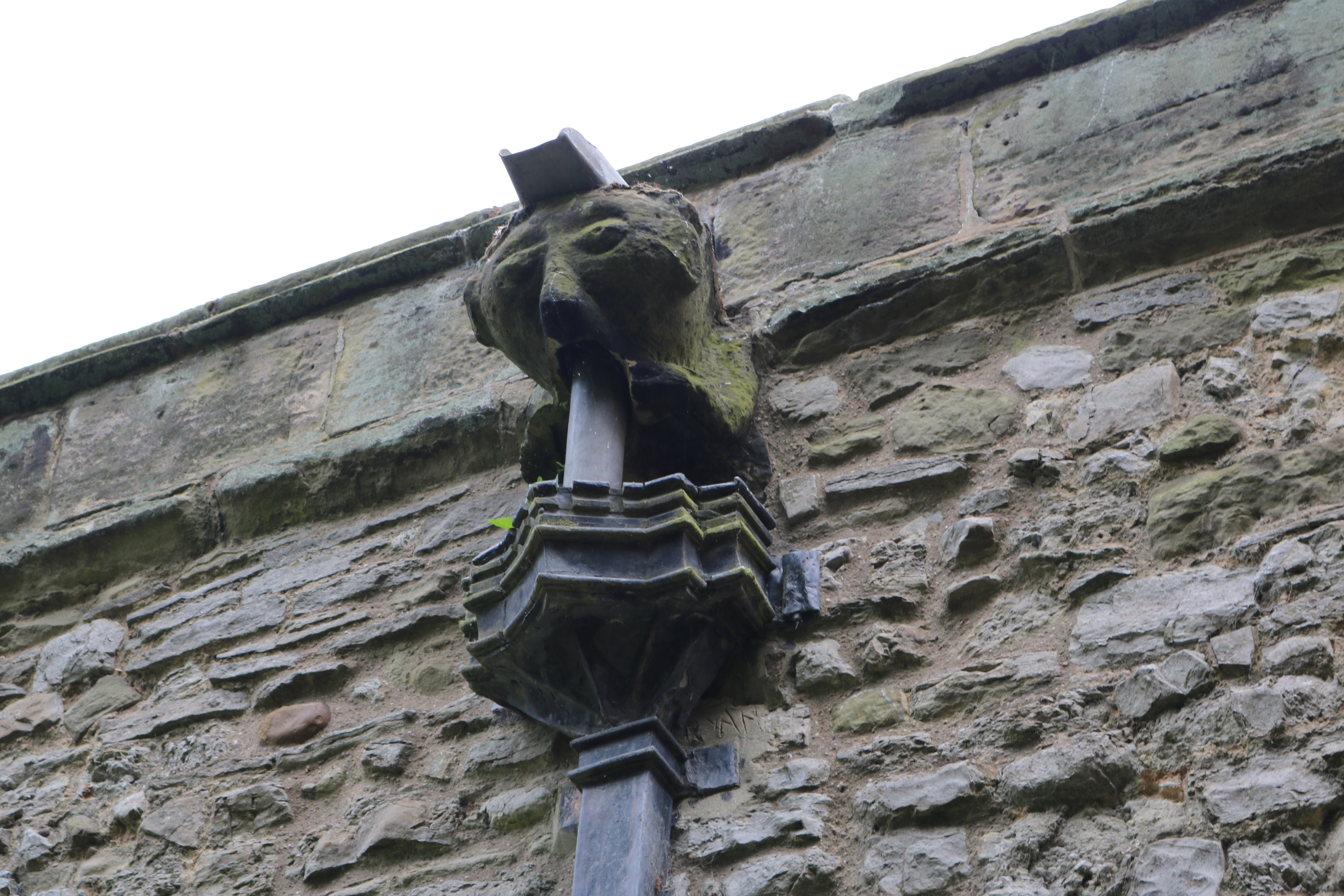
A gargoyle on the central part of the north chancel wall

==== The spire ====
The oldest part of the Church is the tower which was built at the start of the 13th century; a broach-spire was soon added afterwards. The church is one of only two churches in Nottinghamshire to have a central tower crowned with a spire (the other being the Church of St. John in Whatton); although the Chapel of St. Mary at Clumber Park also has a central tower with a spire.

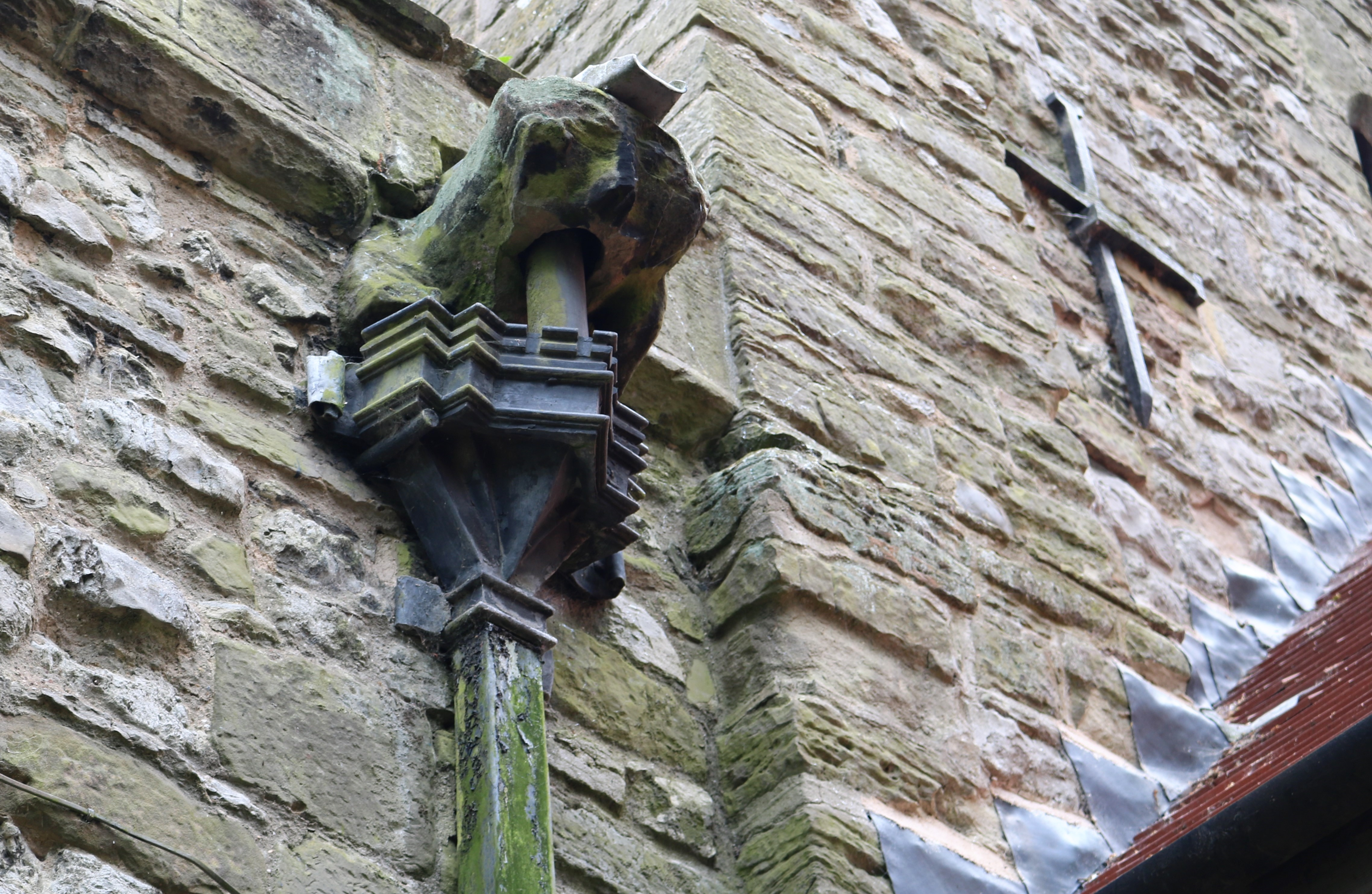
A gargoyle on the western part of the north chancel wall

==== Bells ====
The church tower houses fours bells dating from 1635. With two bells being cracked by 1887, all four bells were recast in 1897 by John Taylor & Co of Loughborough. These four bells were inscribed:

'God save his church'

‘I sweetly toling men do call to taste on meals that feeds the soule’

‘Edward Cotton citizen and merchant tailor of London gave 40 mark to buy this bell’

‘This bell was given to this church and parish by Edward Darling esq. & Susanna his wife’

Due to lack of maintenance the bells could not be rung in the 1950s, and so in 1978 the bells were repaired and rehung by John Taylor & Co.

==== Gargoyles ====
On the north wall, on the exterior of the chancel, there are three gargoyles. A drainage system for rainwater has been integrated into the gargoyles.

== Monuments ==
=== Description ===
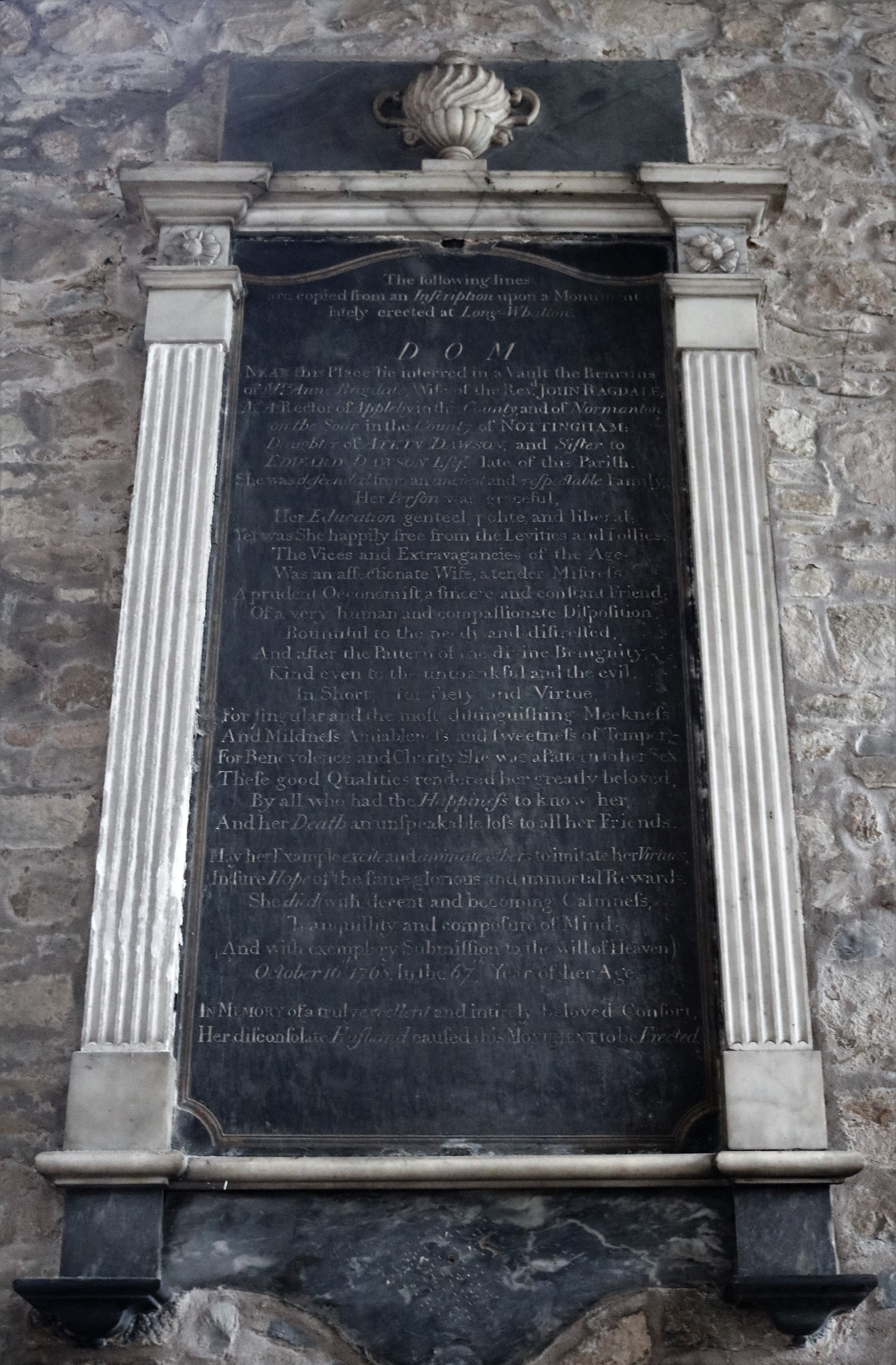
The monument to Anne Ragdale, dated 1768.

The listing of St. James' Church makes reference to five monuments (or memorials) in the church, however earlier historical references, notably John Throsby's 1790 Thoroton's History of Nottinghamshire, state there were, previously, a greater number of memorials. In the nave there are a total of three memorials: there is a monument to John Bosworth, dated 1832, another to Elizabeth Cox, dated 1833, and a further memorial to Anne Ragdale, the late wife of the rector John Ragdale, dated 1768. Anne Ragdale's monument consists of an inscription tablet flanked with two fluted pilasters on either side, with a cornice capped by a decorative urn.

Within the chancel there are two further memorials. There is a monument to Frances Willoughbie, dated 1606, decorated with strapwork containing a kneeling female figure at a lectern. Frances Willoughbie, the daughter of William Walkeden, died in 1606, having married first Gilbert Willoughby, and subsequently Peter Columbell, of Barley Dale, Derbyshire. There is another memorial to William and Susanna Willougby, dated 1636, which consists of an inscription; capping the inscription tablet are two kneeling figures.

=== References in literature ===
John Throsby's Thoroton's History of Nottinghamshire, published in 1790, refers to the monument of Anne Ragdale in his section on the village. John Throsby makes disapproving remarks on the glowing inscription of the monument:

And a large tablet to the memory of a late rector's wife, who died in 1768. She might deserve a good character; but the flattering inscription, intending to display her virtues, &c. is the most fulsome stuff I ever beheld: When all the goodness and perfections of the CREATOR are ascribed to his creature's, how offensive must it be to him who gave us being? Do the Catholics offend us with their images of saints, their crucifixes, and their beautiful scriptural paintings in their places of worship? And should we suffer in our Protestant churches, disgraceful inscriptions of mortals, whose characters are given, as it should seem, to vie with that of the ALMIGHTY?--- Within and without, this church bears evident marks of antiquity.

== War memorial ==
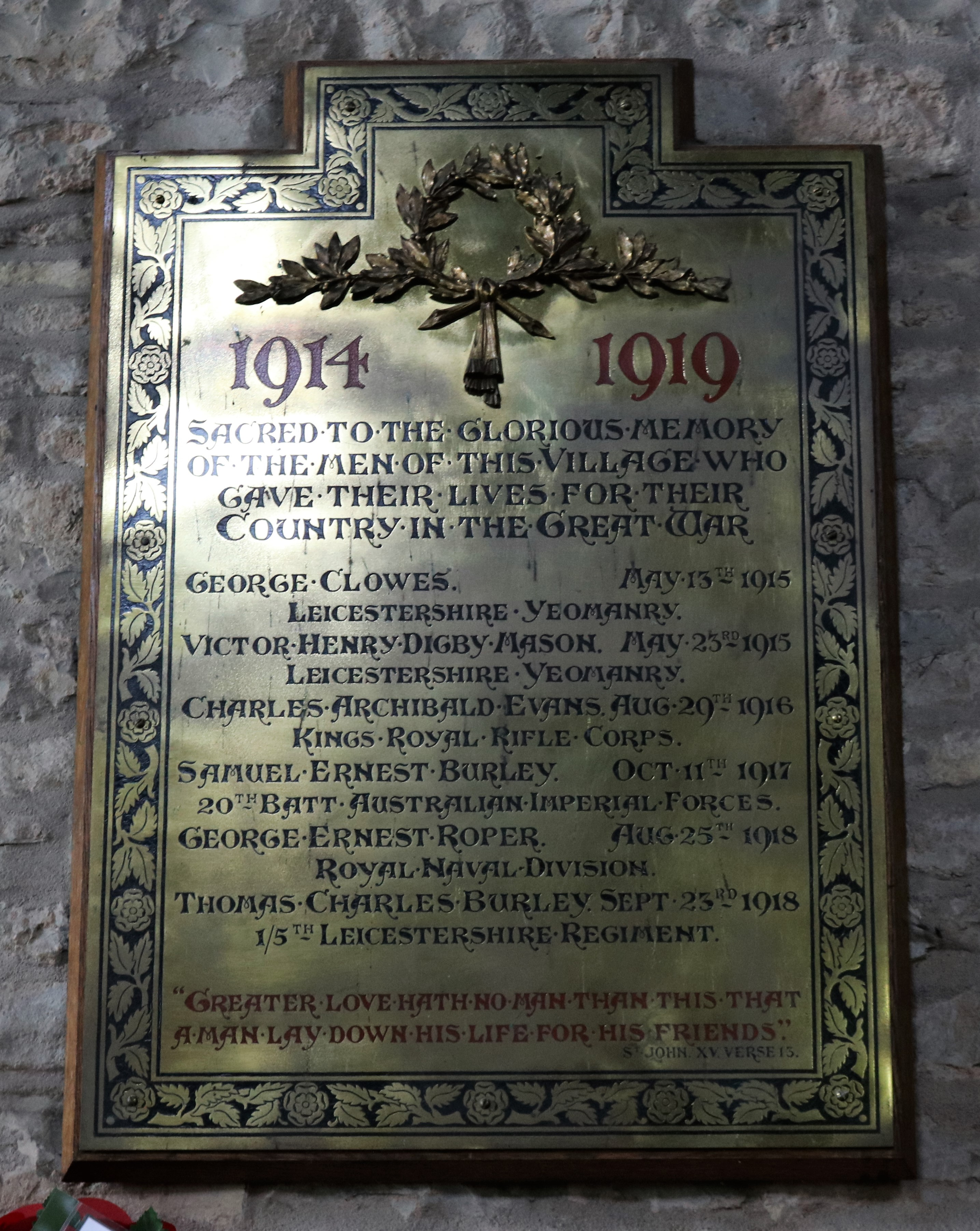
The bronze war memorial, located on the north wall of the nave

Within the Church there is a bronze war memorial remembering the lives of six villagers who were killed in World War One.

Names on the Memorial:

- Samuel Ernest Burley (Sergeant in the 20th Bn Australian Infantry. Died 09 Oct 1917 aged 27)
- Thomas Charles Burley (Private in the 1/5th Bn Leicestershire Regiment. Died 23 Sep 1918 aged 21)
- George Clowes (Private in the C Sqdn Leicestershire Yeomanry. Died 13 May 1915 aged 19)
- Charles Archibald Evans (Rifleman in the 10th Bn King's Royal Rifle Corps. Died 29 Aug 1916 aged 22)
- Victor Henry Digby Mason (Private in the Leicestershire Yeomanry. Died 24 May 1915 aged 18)
- George Ernest Roper (Able Seaman in the Hawke Bn Royal Naval Division. Died 25 Aug 1918 aged 19)

== Previous clergy ==
An incomplete list of previous clergy:

1236–?: Henry of Melsamby

c.1300–?: Walter of Gloucester

1500–?: Ralph Hedworth (also rector of Stanford on Soar)

1546–1549: Maurice Caine

1584–1628: Robert Elvington (buried within the chancel)

1628–1637: Richard Chaldwell (buried within the chancel)

1637–1648: John Bentley (buried within the chancel)

1649–1679: John Marler (buried within the chancel)

1679–1694: Hugh Prichard (buried within the chancel)

1729–1735: Nicholas Richards (buried within the chancel)

1736–1777: John Ragdale

1777–1831: William Holmes (died in Bath, aged 84; in 1827, a Nottingham court was held to determine if the rector was suffering from lunacy)

?–1868: Joseph Powell (died 20 September, at the Rectory)

?–1938: Walter Edward Buckland (died 14 May, at the Rectory, aged 84. Funeral held at St Anne's Sutton Bonignton)

1948–1954: Gilbert A. E. Harries

c.1954–c.1965: William Walker

1965–1979: Philip Pennant (also rector of Sutton Bonington)

1979–1993: Arthur Clarke (became the first priest of the united benefice in 1991)

1993–?: Colin Perkins

2015–Present: Michale J Brock

== Gallery ==
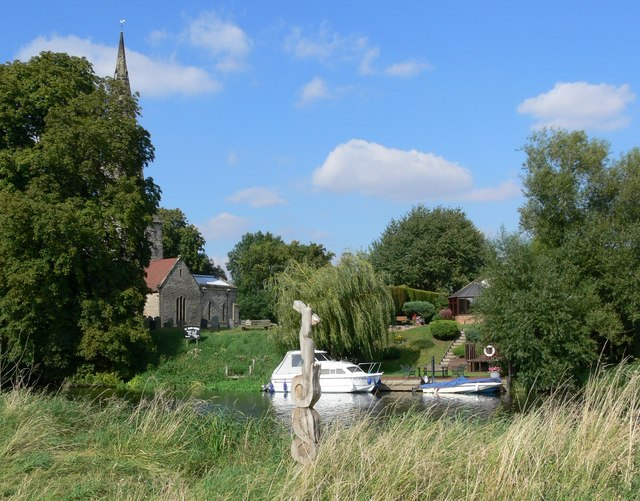
St. James' Church from across the River Soar

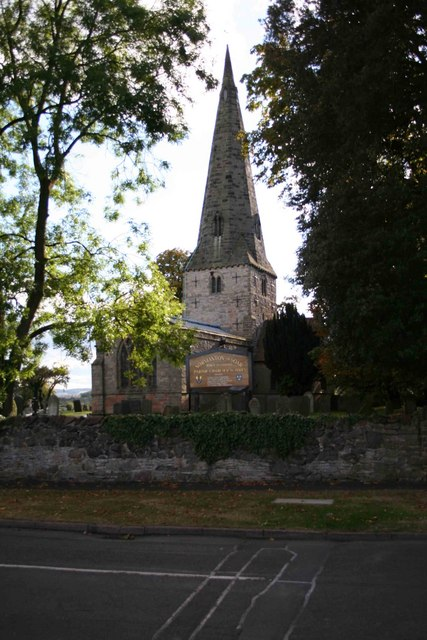
St. James' Church from Main Street

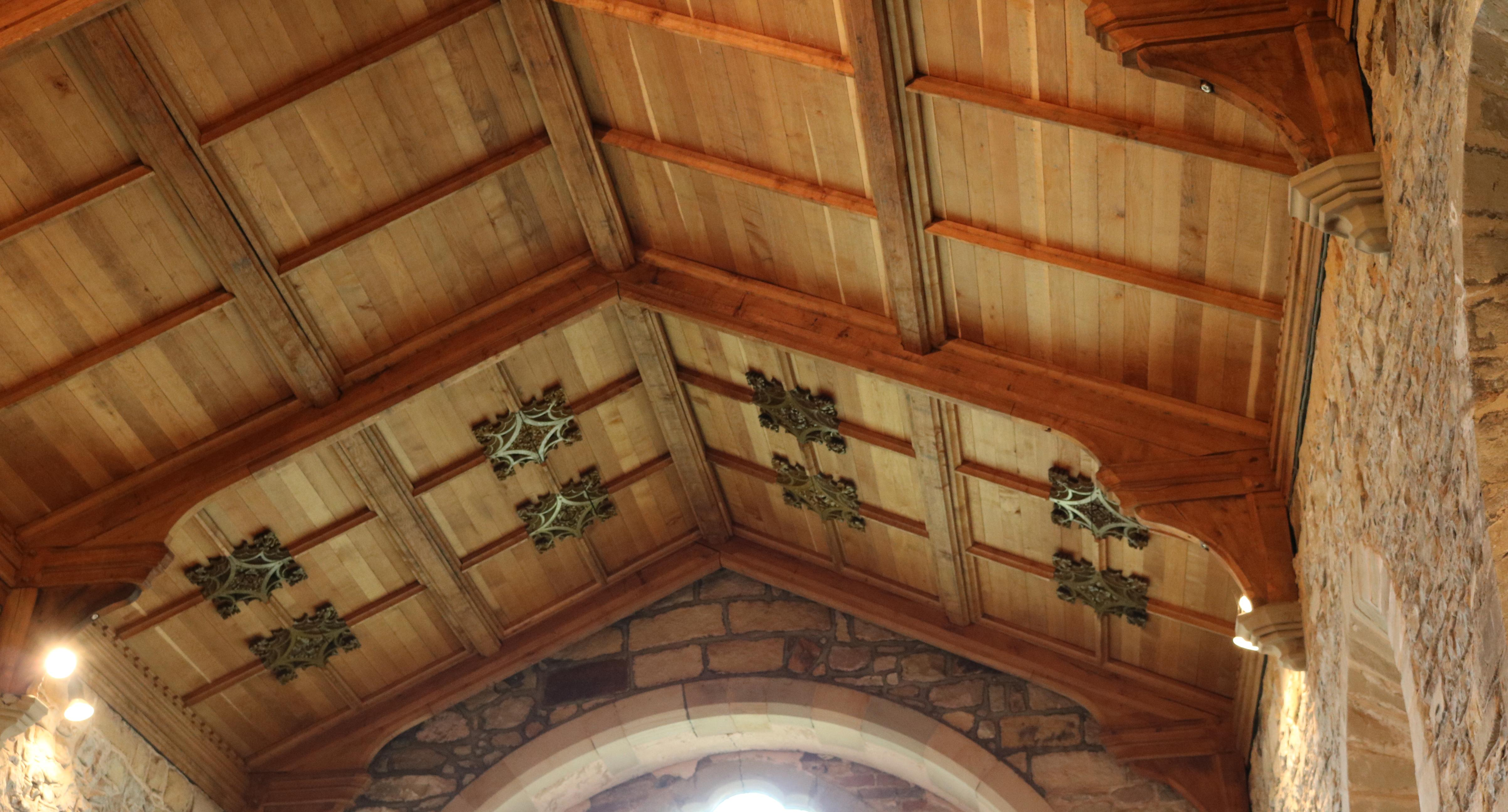
The restored chancel roof, completed in 1989

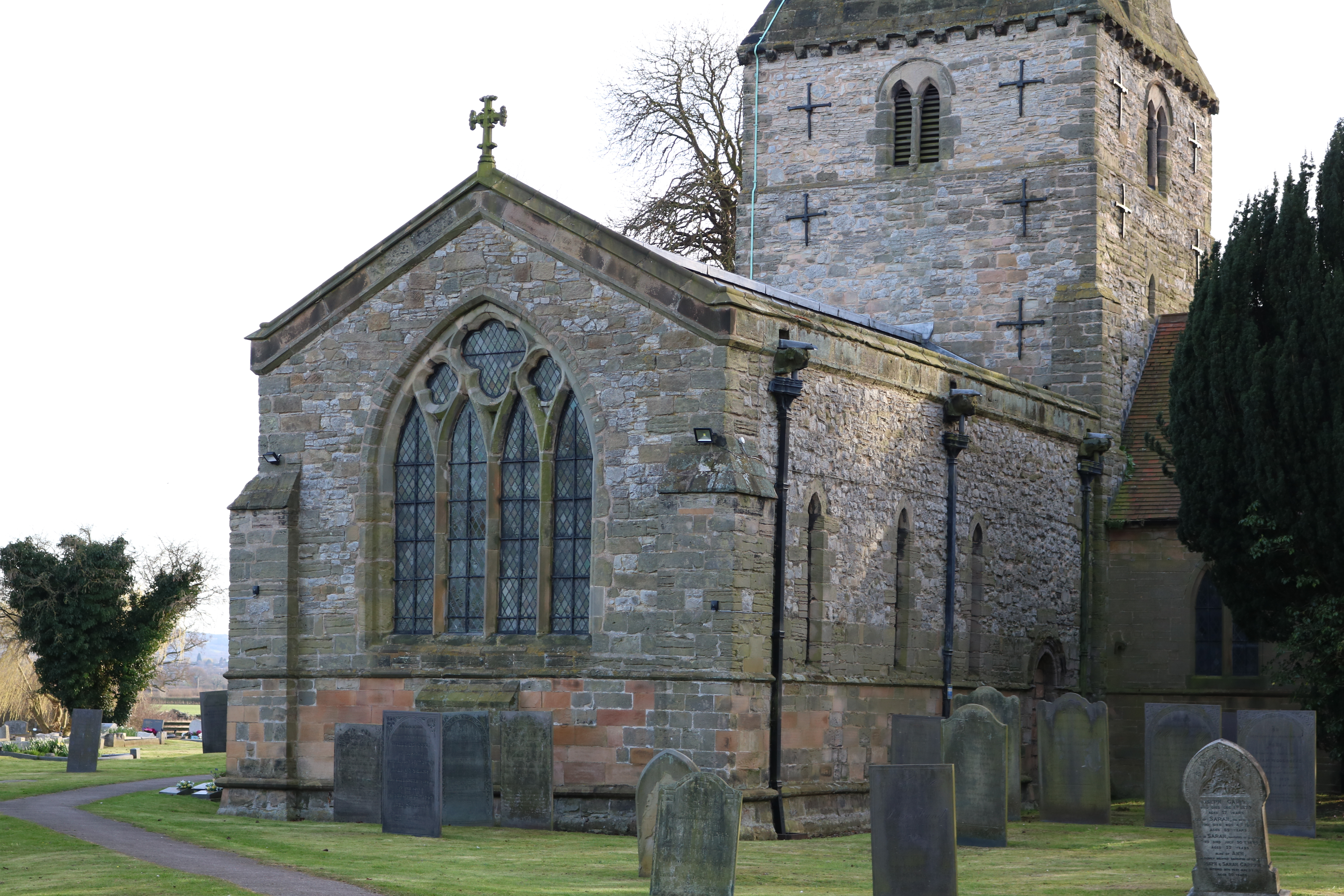
Exterior of the chancel of St. James' Church

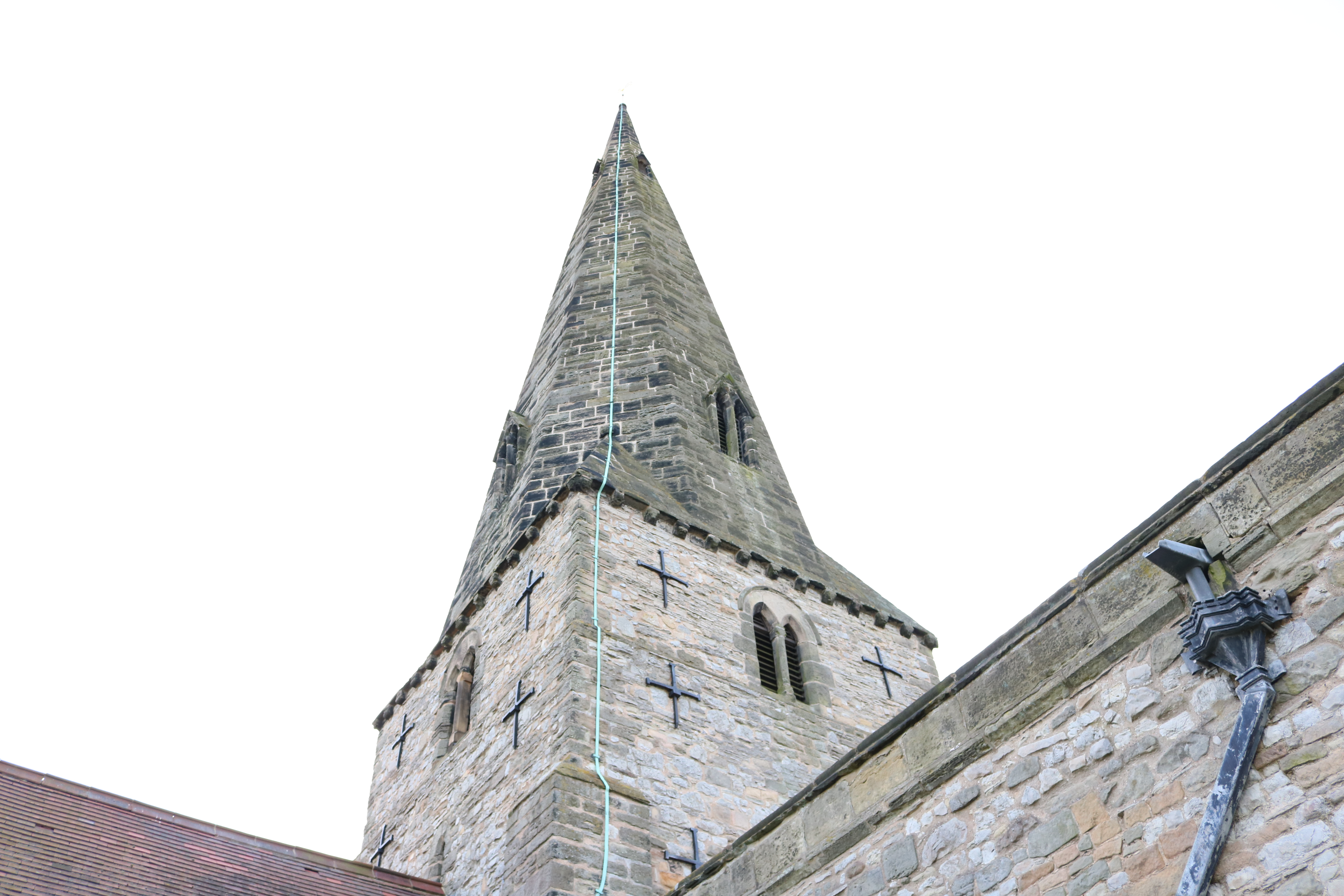
Tower and spire of St. James' Church

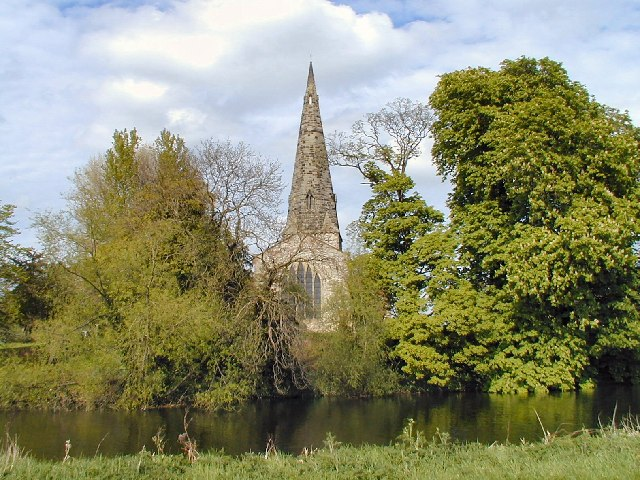
St James' Church from across the River

== See also ==
- Grade I listed buildings in Nottinghamshire
- Listed buildings in Normanton on Soar
