= Hawksworth, Nottinghamshire =

Village and civil parish in Nottinghamshire, England

Coordinates: 52.98°N 0.88°W

Hawksworth
- Village and civil parish
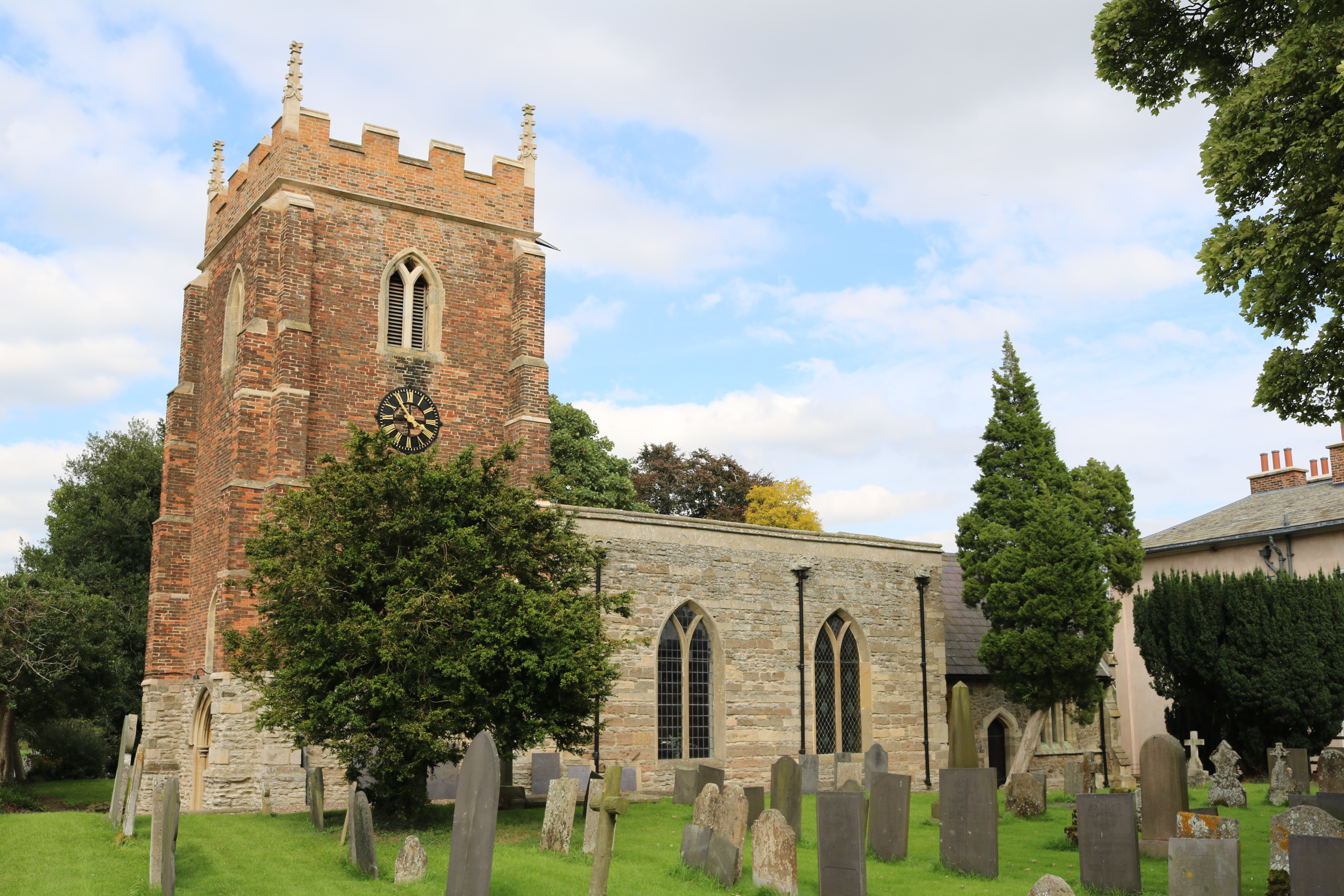
- Church of St Mary and All Saints, Hawksworth

- Location within Nottinghamshire
- Interactive map of Hawksworth
- Area: 1.08 sq mi (2.8 km^{2})
- Population: 113 (2021)
  - Density: 105/sq mi (41/km^{2})
- OS grid reference: SK 752434
  - London: 105 mi (169 km) SSE
- District: Rushcliffe
- Shire county: Nottinghamshire
- Region: East Midlands
- Country: England
- Sovereign state: United Kingdom
- Post town: NOTTINGHAM
- Postcode district: NG13
- Dialling code: 01949
- Police: Nottinghamshire
- Fire: Nottinghamshire
- Ambulance: East Midlands
- UK Parliament: Newark

Hawksworth is an English conservation village and civil parish in the Rushcliffe borough of Nottinghamshire. It lies 10 miles (16 km) south of Newark-on-Trent, adjacent to the villages of Flintham, Sibthorpe, Thoroton, Scarrington and Screveton.

== Description ==
=== Setting ===
Hawksworth comes within the South Nottinghamshire Farmland Character Area which is described as being "a prosperous lowland agricultural region with a simple rural character of large arable fields, village settlements and broad alluvial levels." The Conservation Appraisal states that "the surrounding flat landscape has been divided into large arable fields."

White's Directory of Nottinghamshire, written in 1853, describes Hawksworth as follows:

Hawkesworth, anciently called Hocheword, is a small village parish 4 miles north-east of Bingham, and 8 miles south-south-west of Newark. It was of the fee of Walter D'Ayncourt, and partly soc to Aslacton. It now contains 171 inhabitants, and about 800 acres of land, most of which belongs to the Rev. John Storer M.A., who is lord of the manor. Mrs Hunt is the patron of the rectory, which is valued in the King's books at £8 13s 9d, now £268, and is in the incumbency of the Rev. George Hunt Smyttan B.A. At the enclosure (in 1761), 143 acres were allotted in lieu of tithes. The church, dedicated to St Mary and All Saints, is a small building, with a brick tower. The chancel has been lately rebuilt, and contains some fine stained glass by Wailes of Newcastle.

John Throsby, writing during 1790 in his new edition of Robert Thoroton's Antiquities of Nottinghamshire, describes Hawksworth as:

LORDSHIP is small, owned by — Turner, Esq. The village and the church also, are inferior places: the latter is dedicated to St. Mary and All Saints, and has a brick tower.

=== Population ===
According to the 2001 census it had a population of 127, which fell slightly to 122 in the 2011 census, and more so to 113 at the 2021 census. The population in 1870–1872 was given as 176 and the number of houses as 40.

== Heritage ==
=== Toponymy ===
The place-name Hawksworth seems to contain an Old English personal name, Hoc, + worð (Old English), an enclosure, so "Hoc's enclosure". Later the first element was altered through the influence of the Old Norse haukr , a hawk. Hawksworth appears in the Domesday Book of 1086 as Hochesuorde and Huchesworde.

=== Background ===
A Neolithic axe head was found at Glebe Farm in 1916. The village is mentioned twice in the Domesday Book with a taxable value in total of 1.7 geld units. Enclosure of common land took place in 1761. Part of Hawksworth has been a conservation area since February 2010.

=== Church of St Mary and All Saints (Grade II*) ===
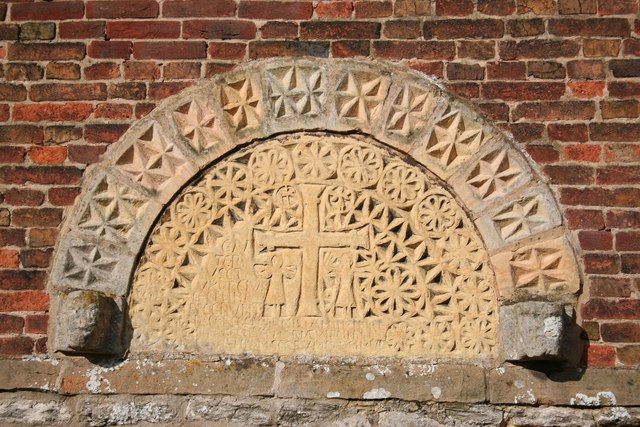
The tympanum at the Church of St Mary and All Saints.

The Church of St Mary and All Saints, Hawksworth, listed Grade II*, is Norman in origin, with an elaborate tympanum, but was almost completely rebuilt in the 19th century. The church contains a large portion of an Anglo-Saxon Cross, which is believed to date back to the late 9th or early 10th century. The Norman tympanum, believed to date to the 12th century, is made of sandstone and is surrounded by a semicircular ornamental stone arch. The tympanum marks the founding of the church in Hawksworth, with the (translated) Latin inscription reading "Walter and his wife Cecelina caused this church to be made in honour of Our Lord and of Saint Mary the Virgin and of all God's Saints likewise". The rebuilding of the church took place in 1812–1813 (nave), 1837 (north aisle) and 1851 (chancel). In 1866 the west porch was demolished and the tympanum, which had been positioned above the porch entrance, was moved to its present position on the south exterior face of the tower. The brick tower dates from the 17th century.

=== Other buildings ===
The village has five other Grade II buildings, all in Town Street: Boundary Walls at Top Farm; Hawksworth Manor House and adjoining Pigeoncote; Hawksworth Place (the former rectory) and adjoining walls; model farm buildings at Top Farm; and Yew Tree Farm and adjoining wall.

During the Second World War, and up until 1952, a group of around 40 women from the Women's Land Army were based in the village at Hawksworth Place. During this time Hawksworth Place was known as the Hawksworth Land Army Hostel.

The National School, which is now a private house, was built in 1844. The Wesleyan chapel, now also a private house, was built in 1883. Until 1987 the former chapel was used as the village hall.

=== Longstanding firm ===
W. B. Stubbs Progress Works was founded in 1836 by a local blacksmith. Today's W. B. Stubbs (Hawksworth) Ltd makes a variety of equipment for stables.

=== Notable residents ===
Walter Gaze Cooper 1895–1981), pianist and composer, from the mid-1970s until his death George Storer MP (1814–1888), a Conservative politician, was born in the village.

== Governance ==
=== Parliamentary elections ===
Hawksworth comes within the Newark parliamentary constituency. The Member of Parliament for Newark is Robert Jenrick, of the Conservative party, who has held the seat since 2014. Jenrick was re-elected at the 2017 General Election with an increased majority of 34,493. The voter turnout for Newark in 2017 was 72.9 per cent.

=== Local government ===
==== County ====
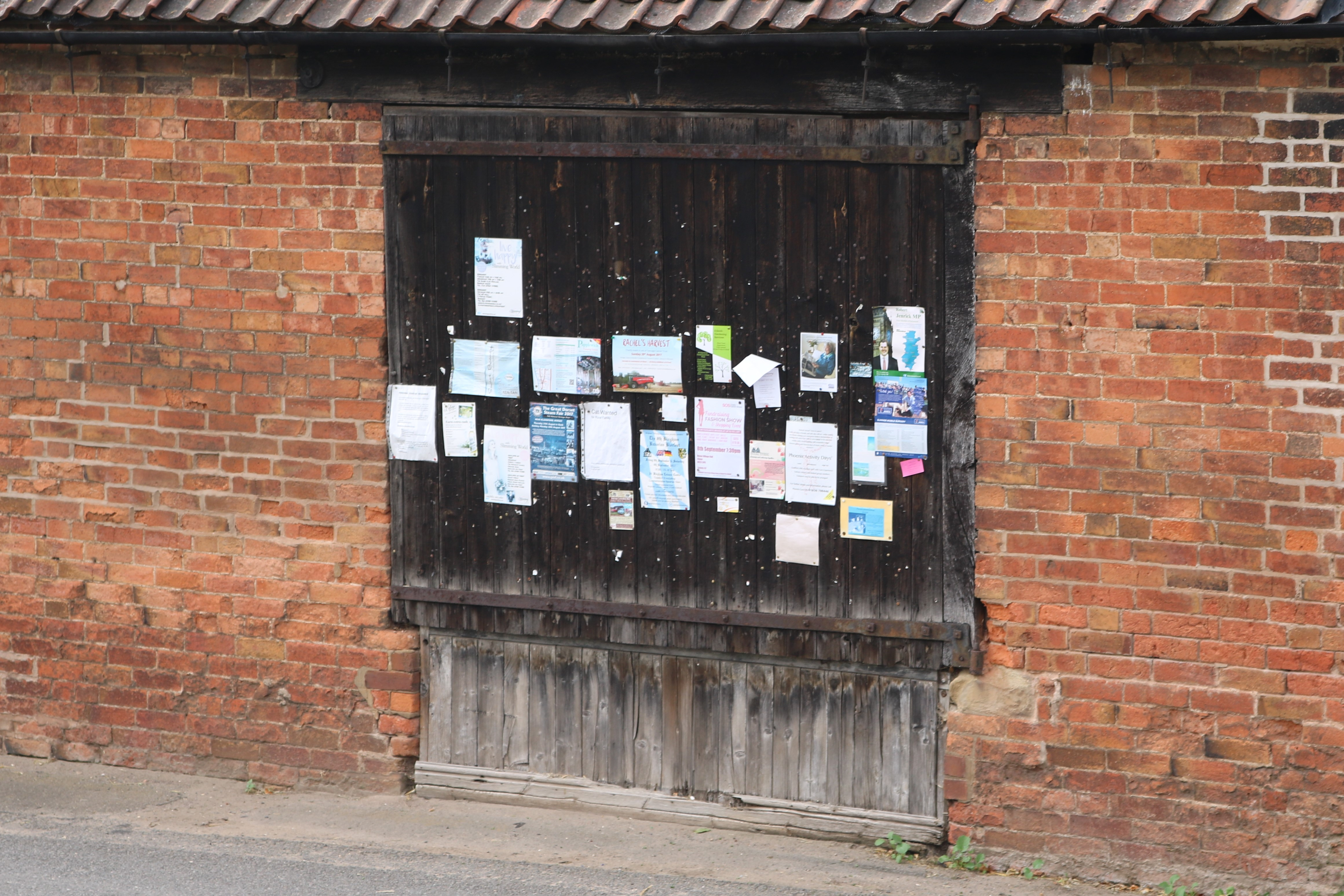
An old barn door in the centre of Hawksworth used for notices.

For Nottinghamshire County Council elections Hawksworth comes within the Bingham East electoral division. The most recent election was in May 2017, when Francis Purdue-Horan, of the Conservative party, was reelected to the seat.

==== Borough ====
For Rushcliffe Borough Council elections Hawksworth comes within the Thoroton ward. The most recent election was at a by-election in May 2017 when Sarah Paulina Bailey of the Conservative party won the seat with a majority of 615. The next Borough election will be on 2 May 2019.

==== Parish ====
Hawksworth does not have a Parish Council, but Parish Meeting instead. Meetings take place "twice yearly and as required".

==== Pre-1894 ====
Historically, Hawksworth lay in Bingham Wapentake or hundred until it joined Bingham Rural District under the terms of the Local Government Act 1894.

== Amenities ==
=== Schools and services ===
There are primary schools at Aslockton (3 miles, 4.8 km) and Orston (3.2 miles, 5.1 km), and primary and secondary schools at Bingham (5 miles, 8 km). Bingham also has the nearest shopping and medical facilities.

The old telephone kiosk, located on Town Street, is no longer operational, but is used as a free book exchange. The village has one postbox, located on Town Street.

=== Pubs ===
The three closest pubs are the Royal Oak at Car Colston (2.7 miles, 4.3 km), The Durham Ox in Orston and the Cranmer Arms at Aslockton.

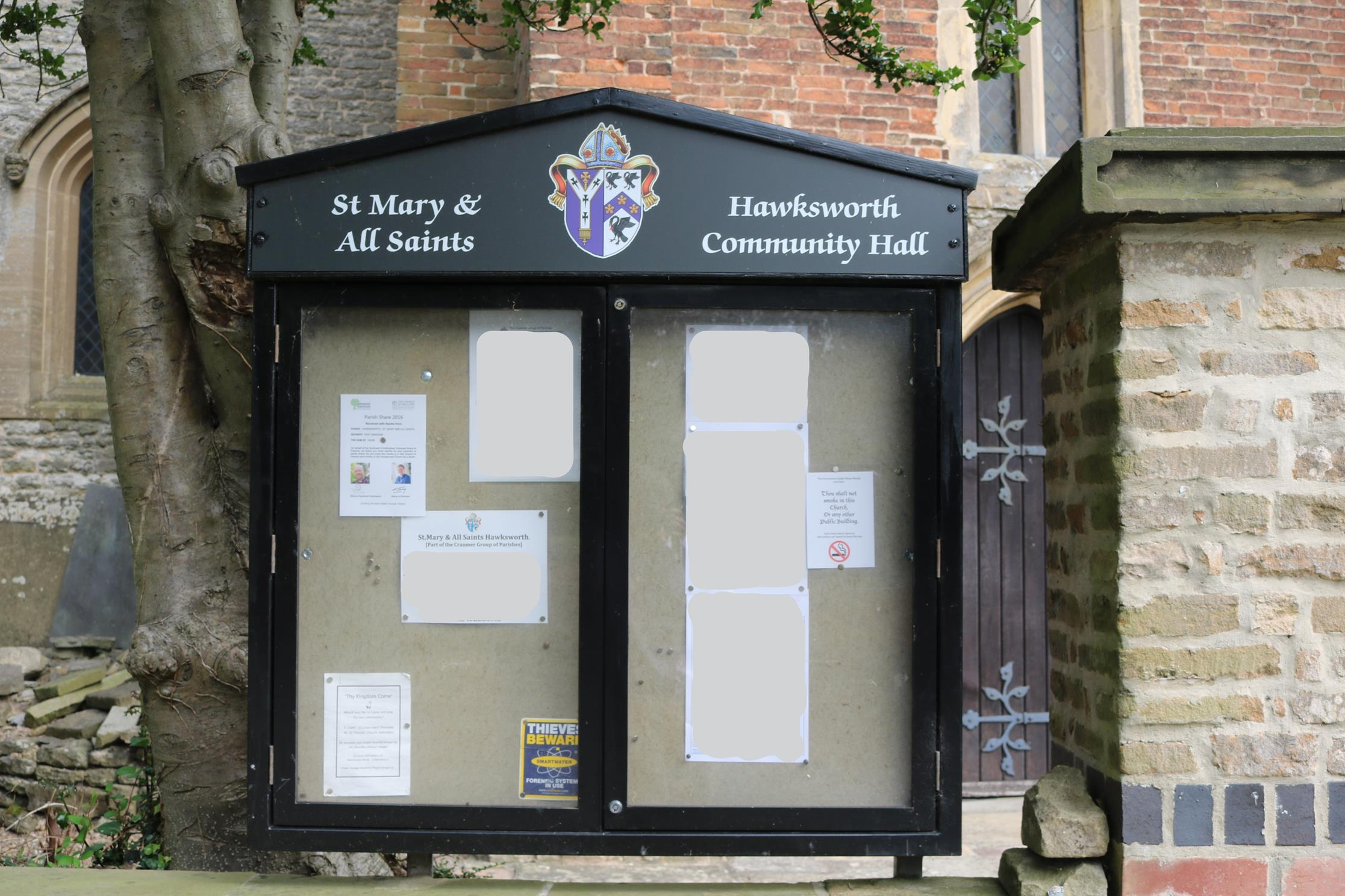
Hawksworth Church & Community Hall Notice Board

=== Churches ===
In 1989 the Church of St Mary and All Saints other than the chancel was deconsecrated to allow part of the space to be used as a village hall. A charity, called the Hawksworth Community Association, was set up to help maintain the building.

There is a monthly church service at the Anglican parish church, at 9:00 a.m. on the fourth Sunday in the month. Scarrington Methodist Church (1.8 miles, 2.9 km) has a service at 6:00 pm on alternate weeks and monthly Bible study.

=== Transport ===
Hawksworth lies 4 miles (6.4 km) east of the main A46 road between Leicester and Newark-on-Trent. It has a bus service consisting of two runs each way on Tuesdays and Thursdays only, serving Lowdham, Bingham, Orston and Bottesford. The nearest frequent daily bus service is between Bingham (5 miles, 8 km) and Nottingham. The nearest station is at Aslockton (3 miles, 4.8 km). The westbound service to Nottingham calls once every hour at peak times and once every two hours at off-peak times.

== See also ==
- Listed buildings in Hawksworth, Nottinghamshire

== Gallery ==
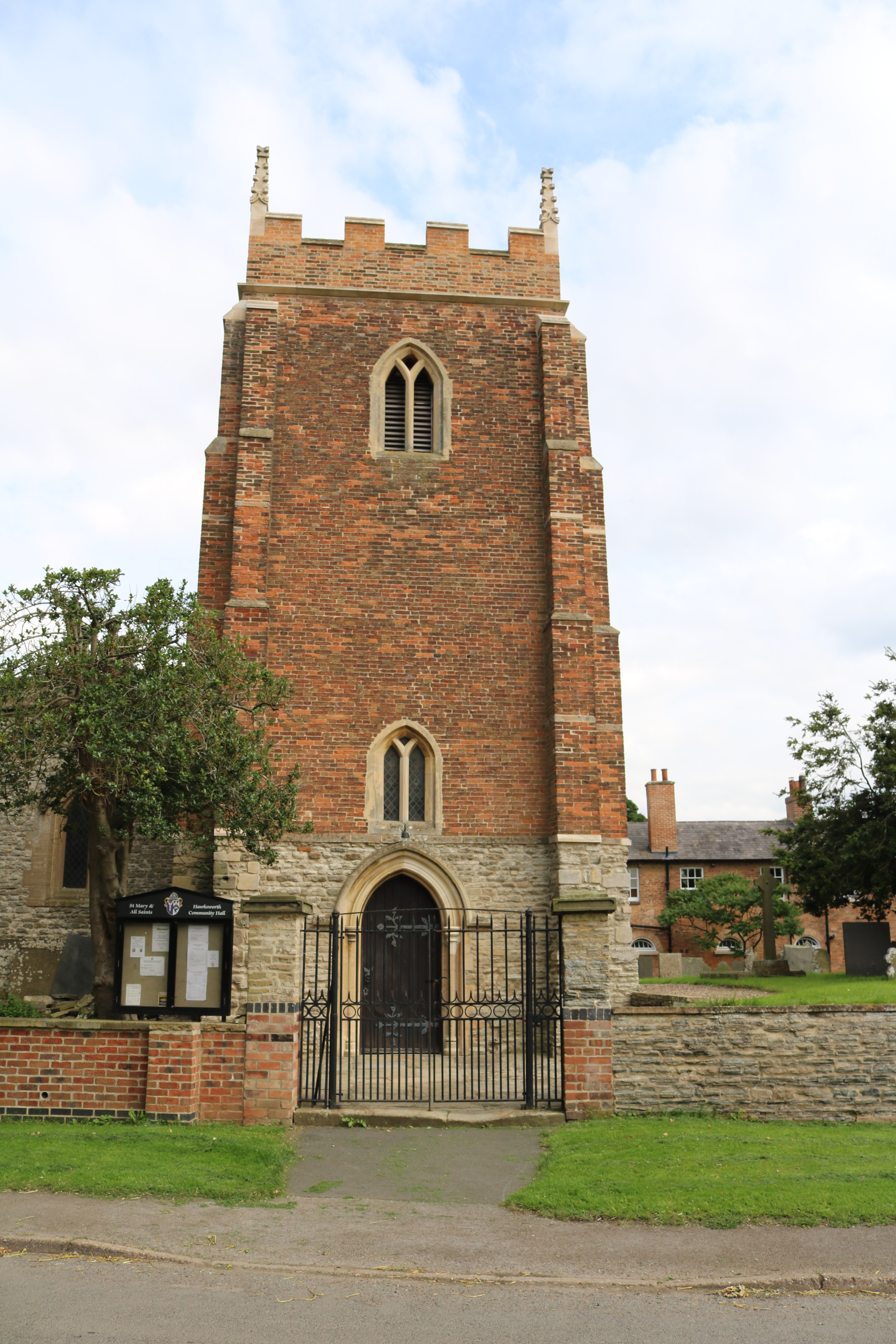
The Church of St Mary and All Saints in Hawksworth

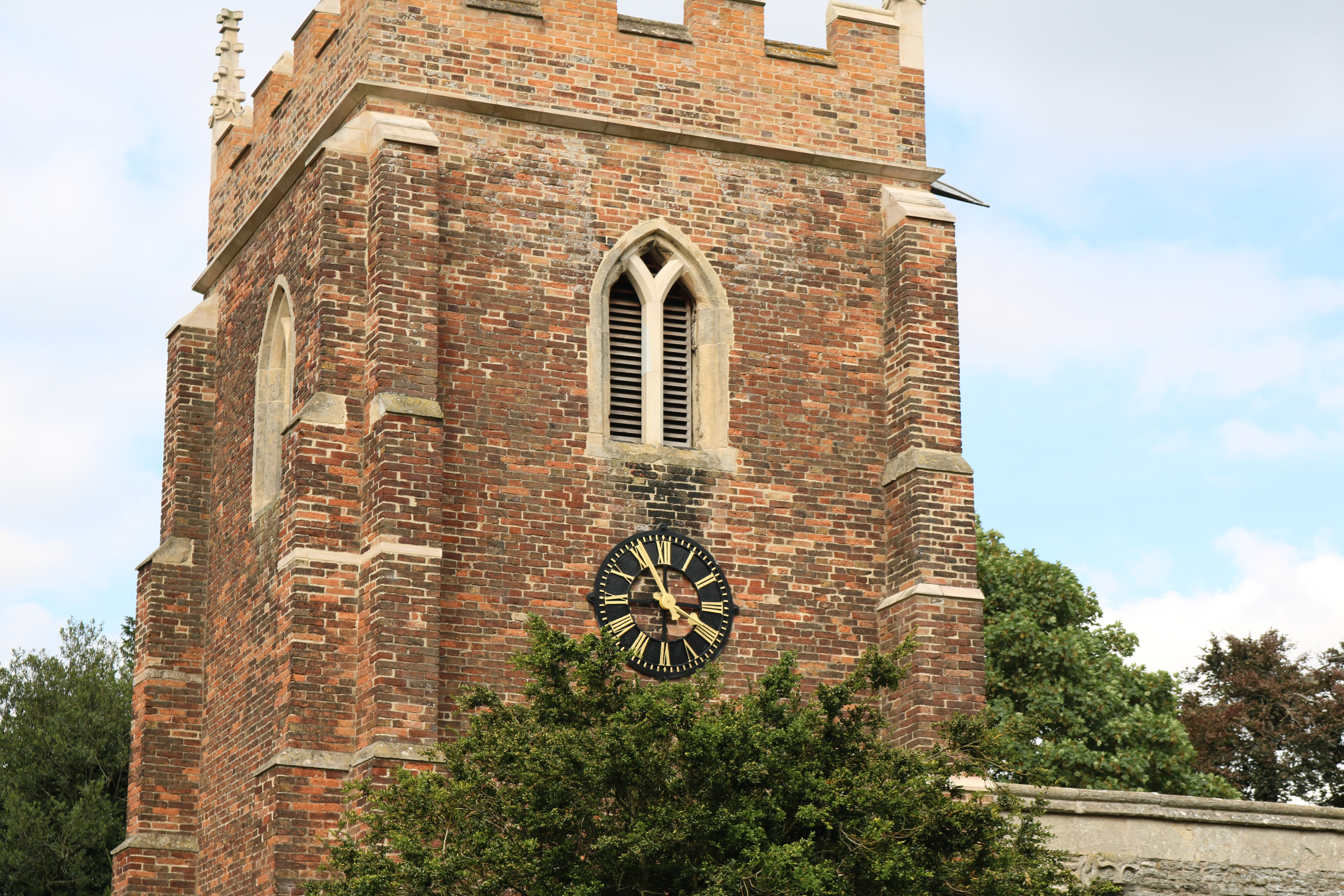
The clock face on the Church of St Mary and All Saints in Hawksworth

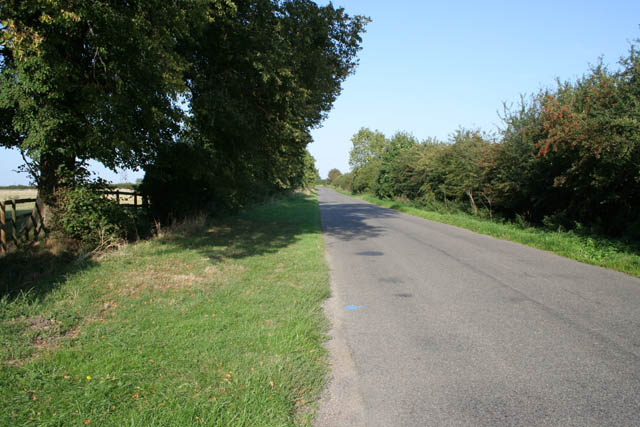
A road to Hawksworth

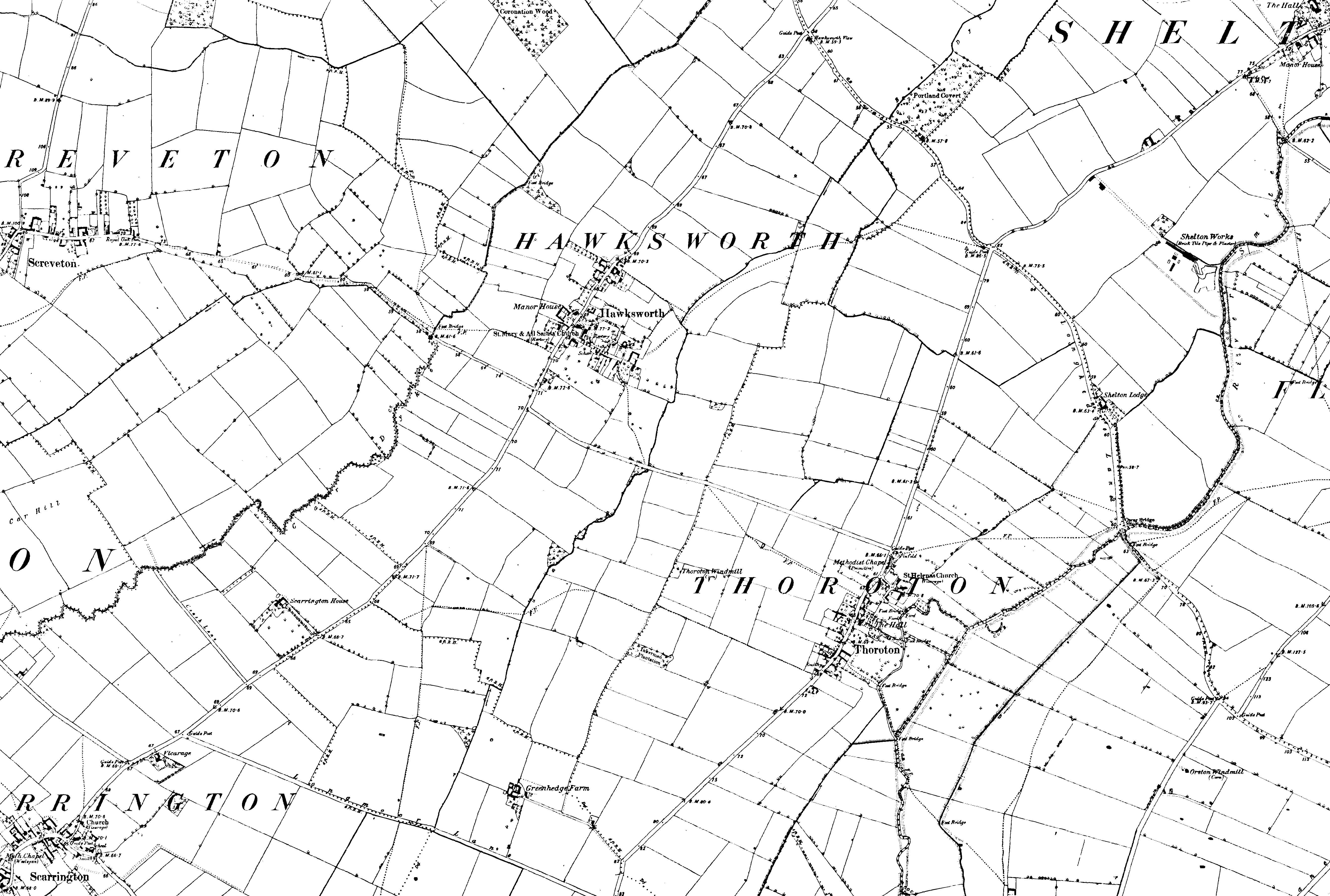
A map of Nottinghamshire showing Hawksworth

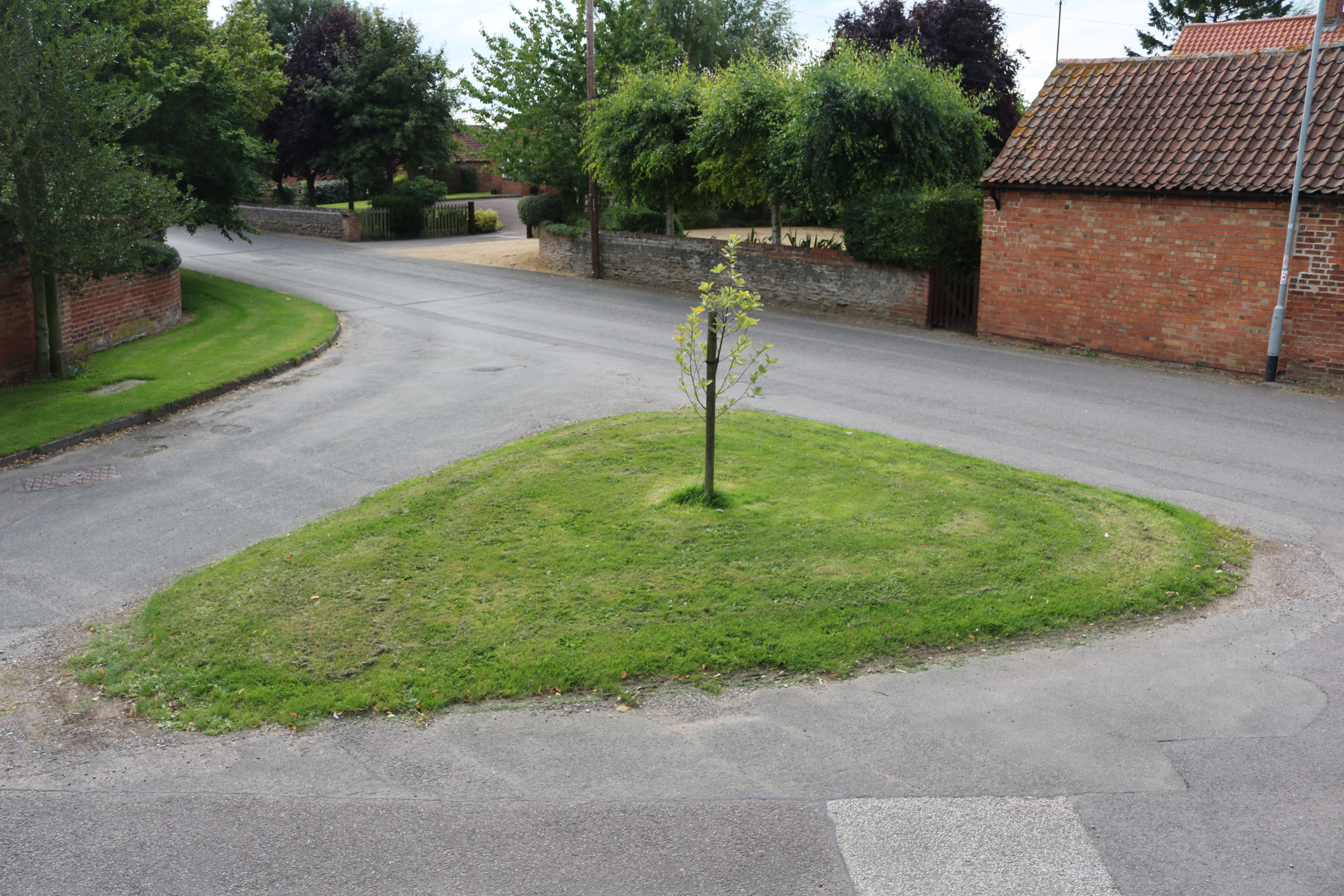
A grass triangle at the centre of Hawksworth
