= Thoroton (surname) =

Thoroton is a surname, and may refer to:

- Charles Thoroton (1875–1939), British naval intelligence officer
- Robert Thoroton (1623–1678), English antiquarian
- Thomas Thoroton (c.1723–1794), British politician
- Thomas Thoroton-Hildyard (1821–1888), English politician
