= Normanton on Soar =

Village and civil parish in Nottinghamshire, England

Coordinates: 52.8034°N 1.235°W

- Village and civil parish
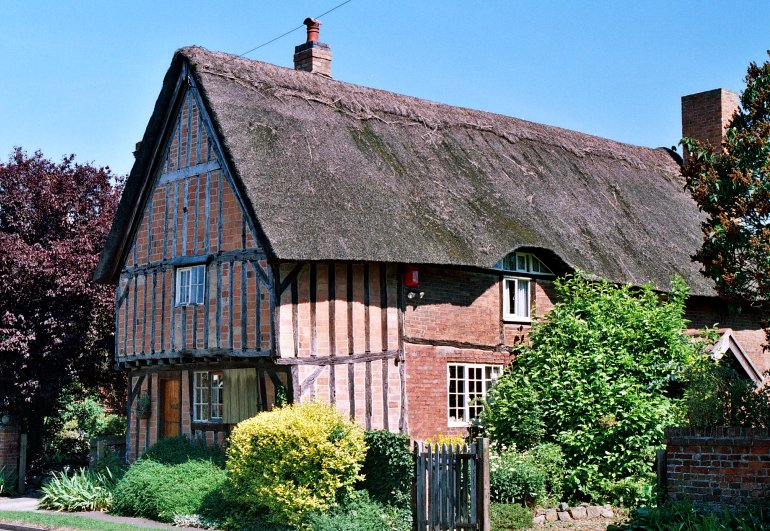
- The Old Post Office

- Location within Nottinghamshire
- Interactive map of Normanton on Soar
- Area: 2.26 sq mi (5.9 km^{2})
- Population: 406 (2021)
  - Density: 180/sq mi (69/km^{2})
- OS grid reference: SK 520228
  - London: 115 mi (185 km) SSE
- District: Rushcliffe
- Shire county: Nottinghamshire
- Region: East Midlands
- Country: England
- Sovereign state: United Kingdom
- Post town: LOUGHBOROUGH
- Postcode district: LE12
- Dialling code: 01509
- Police: Nottinghamshire
- Fire: Nottinghamshire
- Ambulance: East Midlands
- UK Parliament: Rushcliffe
- Website: Normington on Soar

Normanton on Soar (/ˈnɔːrməntən ... ˈsɔːr/), formerly known as Normanton-upon-Soar and known locally as Normanton, is a village and civil parish in the Rushcliffe district of Nottinghamshire, England near the River Soar. This historic village is home to one of the last operating chain ferries in the country, the only lived in cruck building in Nottinghamshire and a 13th-century Grade I listed parish Church.

== Description ==
=== Setting ===
The ancient parish of Normanton on Soar occupies 1,449 acres about 13 miles south-west of Nottingham. Nearby villages include Zouch, Sutton Bonington, and Stanford on Soar. The post town for Normanton is Loughborough leading to the confusion of being in Nottinghamshire but with a Leicestershire post code.

Normanton on Soar is situated in the Soar Valley (previously also known as the 'Vale of the Soar'). The parish is mostly made up of farmland, and contains seven farms. The village is situated along the River Soar and extends uphill north-eastwards towards East Leake.

White's Directory of Nottinghamshire, written in 1853, describes Normanton thus:

Normanton-On-Soar is a picturesque village and parish in the vale of the Soar, 13 miles south by west of Nottingham, bounded on the south by Leicestershire and on the north by the Wolds.

John Throsby, writing during 1790 in his new edition of Robert Thoroton's Antiquities of Nottinghamshire, recalls his account when surveying Normanton:

Shenstone [s]ung while I was viewing the [s]urrounding beauties.

'How [s]weetly [s]miled the Hill, the Vale,

'And all the Land[s]cape round!

'The River gliding down the Dale,

'The Hill with Beeches crown'd!

=== Population ===
The 1881 census reported that the village had 322 inhabitants. The population of the civil parish at the 2011 census was 448, falling to 406 residents at the 2021 census.

=== Lordship of the manor ===
The Lordship of the Manor of Normanton on Soar is currently held since 1995 by John and Enid Burnett as Lord and Lady of the Manor of Normanton on Soar. The Official History Project of everything to do with the Parish is conducted under the direction of the Lord and Lady and the High Steward Ivan J Manning QStJ Esq.

== Toponymy ==
Normanton appears several times in the Domesday survey of 1086 as Normantune and Normantun. The name, Normanton, derives from the Anglo-Saxon 'Northman's Tun' meaning Northman's Farm. It is believed to be first used sometime between AD 870 and 940.

== Heritage ==
=== Listed buildings ===
Normanton on Soar has a Grade I listed Church along with four Grade II listed buildings, all on Main Street: The Old Post Office (75 Main Street), Dovecote at Rangraak, Home Farmhouse and Ivy Cottage.

==== Church of St. James (Grade I) ====
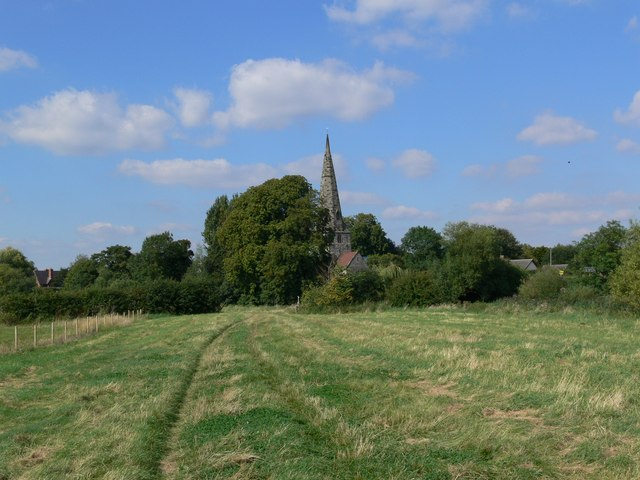
A view of St. James' Church from a nearby field

The medieval Grade I Listed church, Church of St. James, was built in the 13th century. Located in the south of the village, on Main Street, it is situated on the east bank of the River Soar. The church is one of only two churches in Nottinghamshire to have a central tower crowned with a spire (the other being the Church of St. John in Whatton); although the Chapel of St. Mary at Clumber Park also has a central tower with a spire. The C.15th century timber roof was noted for being of "excellent design" in 1910. Also of note are the royal coat-of-arms of Charles II, dated 1683, which sit above the chancel arch. In April 2014 work was completed rebuilding and re-pointing the spire. Within the Church there is a bronze war memorial dedicated to the lives of villagers lost in World War One. The priest in charge also serves the neighbouring parish of Sutton Bonington. There are regular weekly services, with the village choir attending on the first Sunday of each month. The Church is kept open for the public during the day on Saturday and Sunday.

==== Other listed buildings ====
The Old Post Office, on Main Street, is a Grade II listed thatched cruck cottage dating from 1454. It is the oldest house in Normanton and the only lived-in cruck building in Nottinghamshire.

=== Chain ferry ===
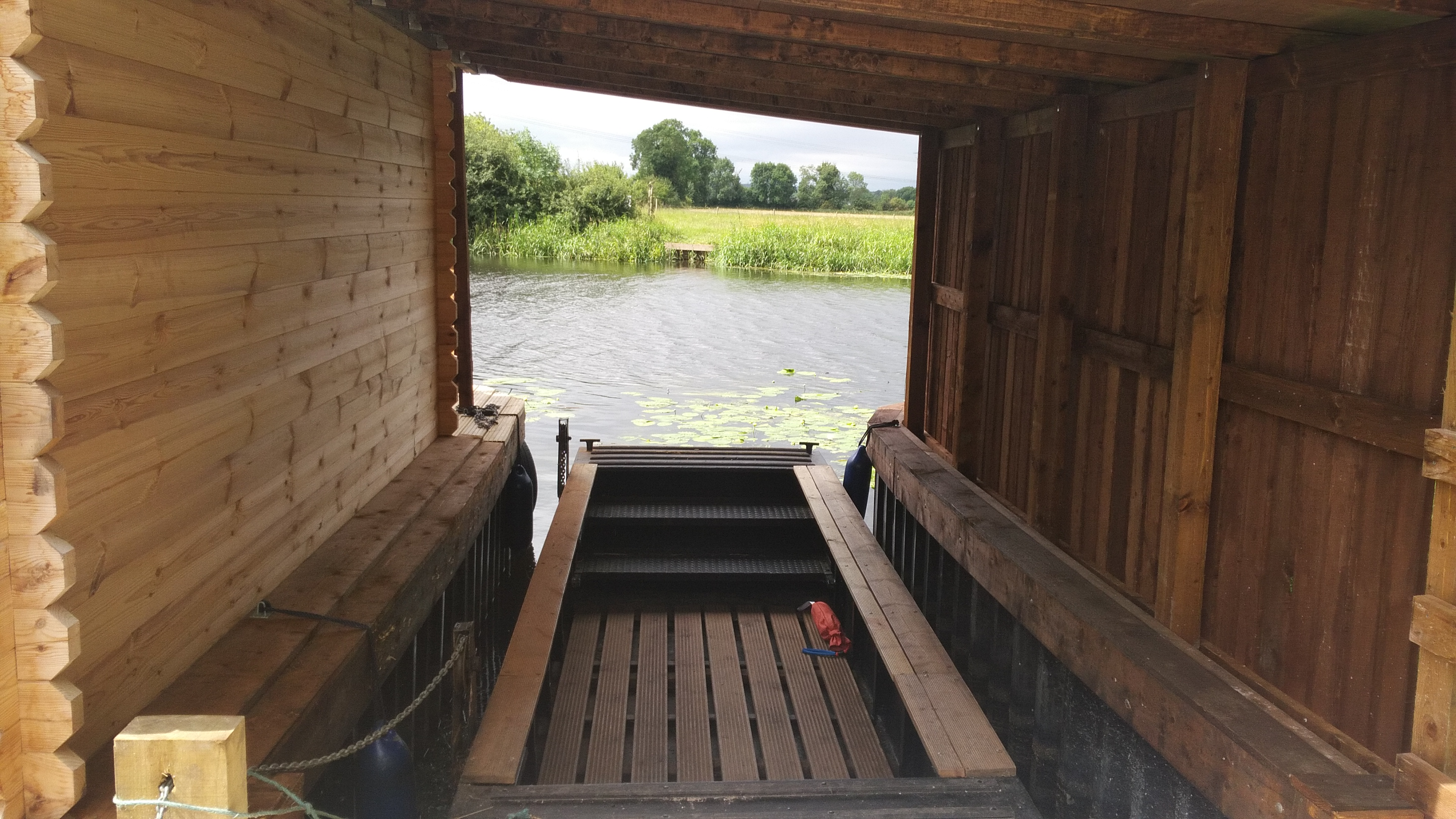
The chain ferry docked on the bank of the River Soar.

The Chain Ferry is located in the south of the village and was mentioned earliest on a map from 1771. It is one of the few remaining Chain Ferries operating in the UK. It is the last chain ferry still operating in Nottinghamshire (the Hazleford Ferry, in Nottinghamshire, is no longer in use). Peter Liddington (1978–2008): Peter dedicated 30 years to operating the vessel, guiding generations of locals, walkers, and visitors across the river. His son also regularly stepped in to assist with the physically demanding task of pulling the boat along its underwater chain.Margarita "Rita" Liddington (2008–2014): Following Peter's tenure, his wife Margarita took over the reins completely. She served as the dedicated ferrywoman for 6 years before the service eventually transitioned into the hands of community volunteers. In 1981 responsibility for the maintenance of the Ferry was transferred from the Paget Estate to the Parish Council. The Ferry was relaunched in April 2017 offering crossings between 10AM and 4:30PM every weekend during the summer (between April and September). The current fee per crossing is £1 per person and 50p per dog/bicycle. The Ferry is operated by volunteers from the village.

=== Other heritage ===
The old telephone box is now used to house a defribrillator which can be accessed in case of an emergency.

In June 2012 a memorial plaque was unveiled on the playing fields commemorating the crash of a Wellington Bomber in the village on 19 April 1944 during a training exercise. Four members of the Royal Air Force were killed.

== Local government and elections ==
=== Parliamentary elections ===
The current MP for the constituency of Rushcliffe is James Naish (Labour) who replaced Ruth Edwards (Conservative) in the parliamentary election held on 4 July 2024.

The Member of Parliament for the parliamentary constituency of Rushcliffe was Kenneth Clarke, of the Conservative party, who held the seat from 1970 to 2019. Despite stating he would not stand for reelection in June 2016 (before the announcement of the 2017 election), Ken Clarke stood for reelection at the 2017 General Election and was reelected with a reduced majority of 8,010. The voter turnout for Rushcliffe was 78%, which was the ninth highest in the country.

=== Local government ===
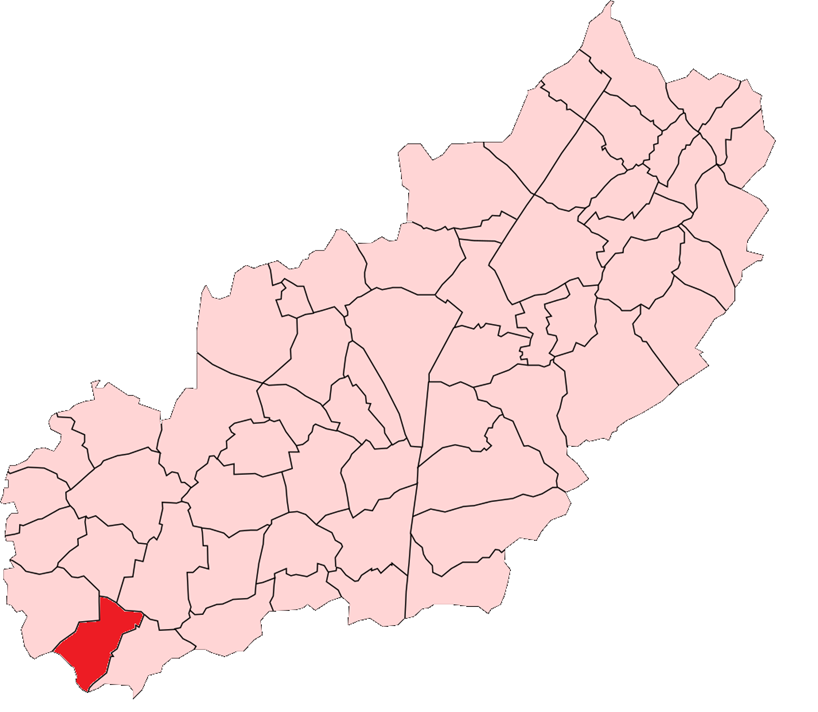
The Parish of Normanton-on-Soar within the Rushcliffe Borough.

==== County council ====
For Nottinghamshire County Council elections the parish comes within the Leake & Ruddington electoral ward, which has two council seats. The most recent election was in May 2017, when Andy Brown and Reg Adair, both of the Conservative party, won the two available seats.

==== Borough council ====
For the election of a councillor to Rushcliffe Borough Council, the parish forms part of the Leake ward, which has three council seats. The most recent election was on 7 May 2015 when Ronald Hetherington, Margaret Males and John Thurman, all of the Conservative party, won the three available seats. The next Borough election will be on 2 May 2019.

==== Parish council ====
The parish council has seven seats. Council meetings usually take place on the first Thursday of each month at the village hall.

=== Historic ===
The parish fell within the ancient Rushcliffe wapentake of Nottinghamshire. Before 1894 Normanton, along with the nearby villages of Sutton Bonnington, Stanford on Soar, East Leake and West Leake, was part of the Loughborough Rural Sanitary District. From 1894 the parish was part of the Leake Rural District, until its abolition in 1935, when the parish was then transferred to the Basford Rural District. In 1974 the Basford Rural District was abolished and the non-metropolitan district of Rushcliffe was created, which Normanton became part of.

== Amenities ==
=== Education and schools ===
Within the village there is a small primary school, located on Main Street, catering for children aged between three and eleven. In its most recent Ofsted report (2013) the school was rated as Good.

=== Transport ===
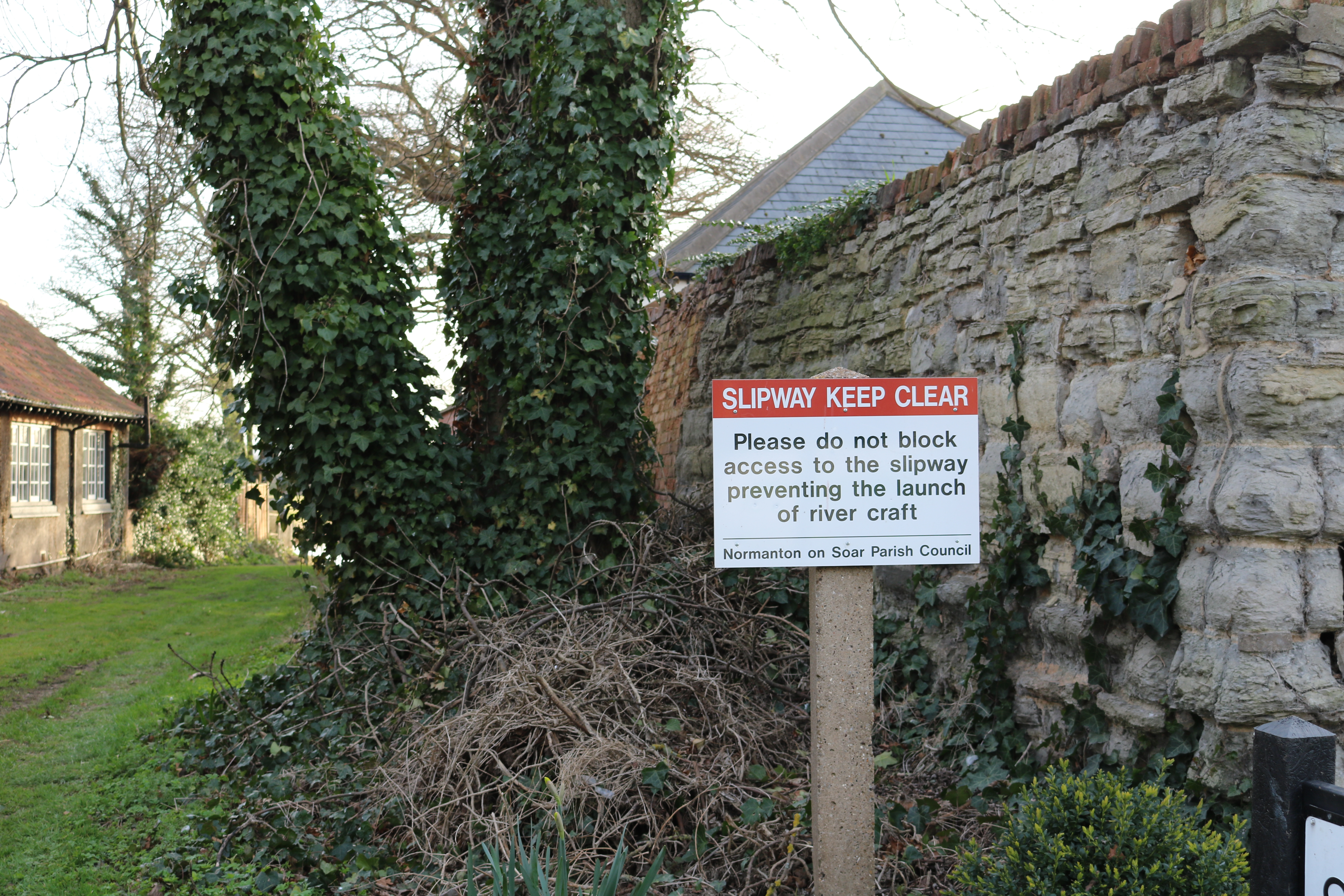
Slipway sign on Soar Lane

The village is served by the Skylink bus service, operated by Trent Barton, which can be taken from the edge of the village on the A6006. The village is also served by the volunteer-run Soar Valley Bus service which can be taken from within the village. Both bus services provide regular journeys to Loughborough and Nottingham.

=== Other amenities ===
The Village Hall, built in 2007, is located south within the village and is available for hire. The community shop is run by volunteers and is located at the rear of the Village Hall. The shop is open Monday to Friday and Saturday morning. The Village Hall is surrounded by 5 acres of playing fields with an outdoor children's play area. The village allotments are located behind the Village Hall.

The Soar Boating Club is a private members club which was founded in the spring of 1953. In 1961 the club acquired its current position on Main Street. The club has a membership of around 100 boats and holds its main annual rally over the spring bank holiday.

The village has a pub, located on Main Street, called the Plough Inn. The pub is positioned along the river bank and offers free moorings. Next to the Plough Inn, but separate, Soar Lane offers access to a slipway for launching river craft.

== Gallery ==
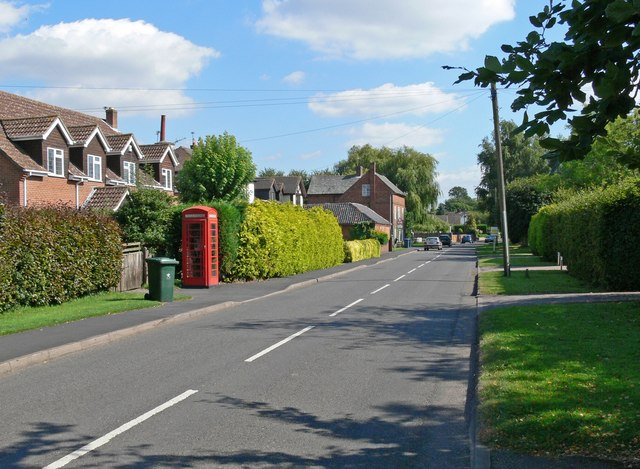
Main Street

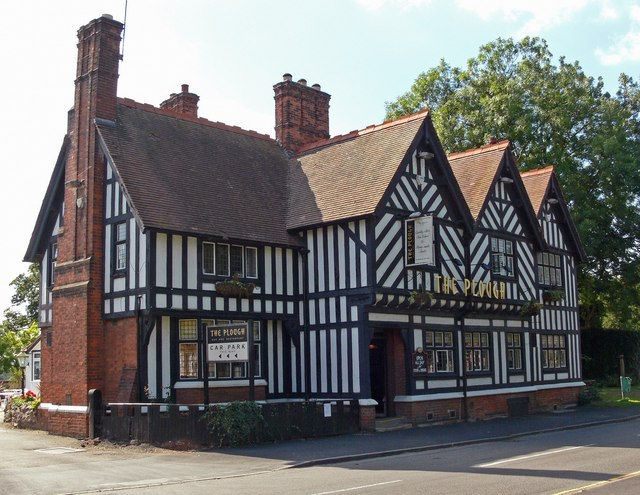
The Plough Inn

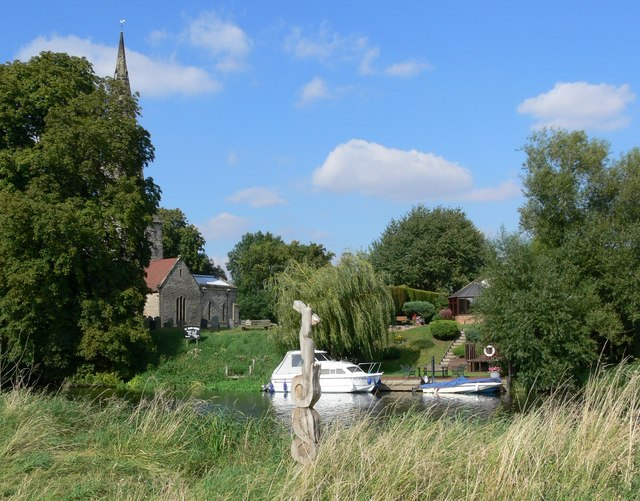
St. James' Church from across the River Soar

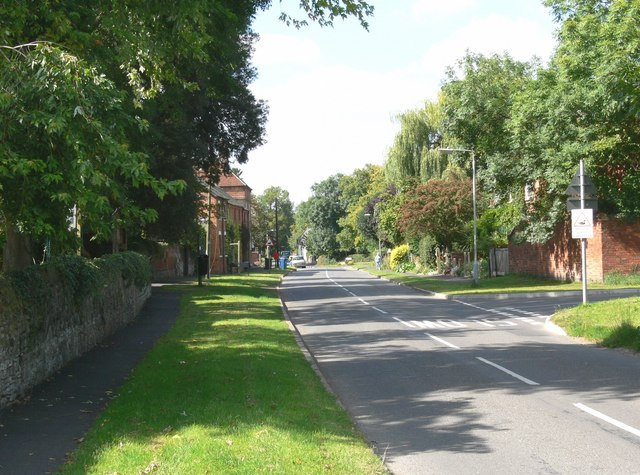
Main Street

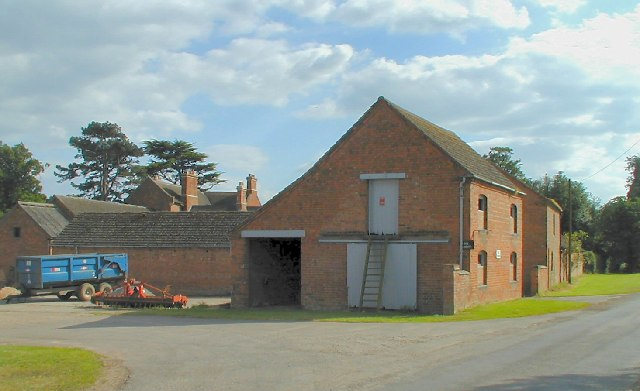
Cedars Farm (at the top of Butt Lane)

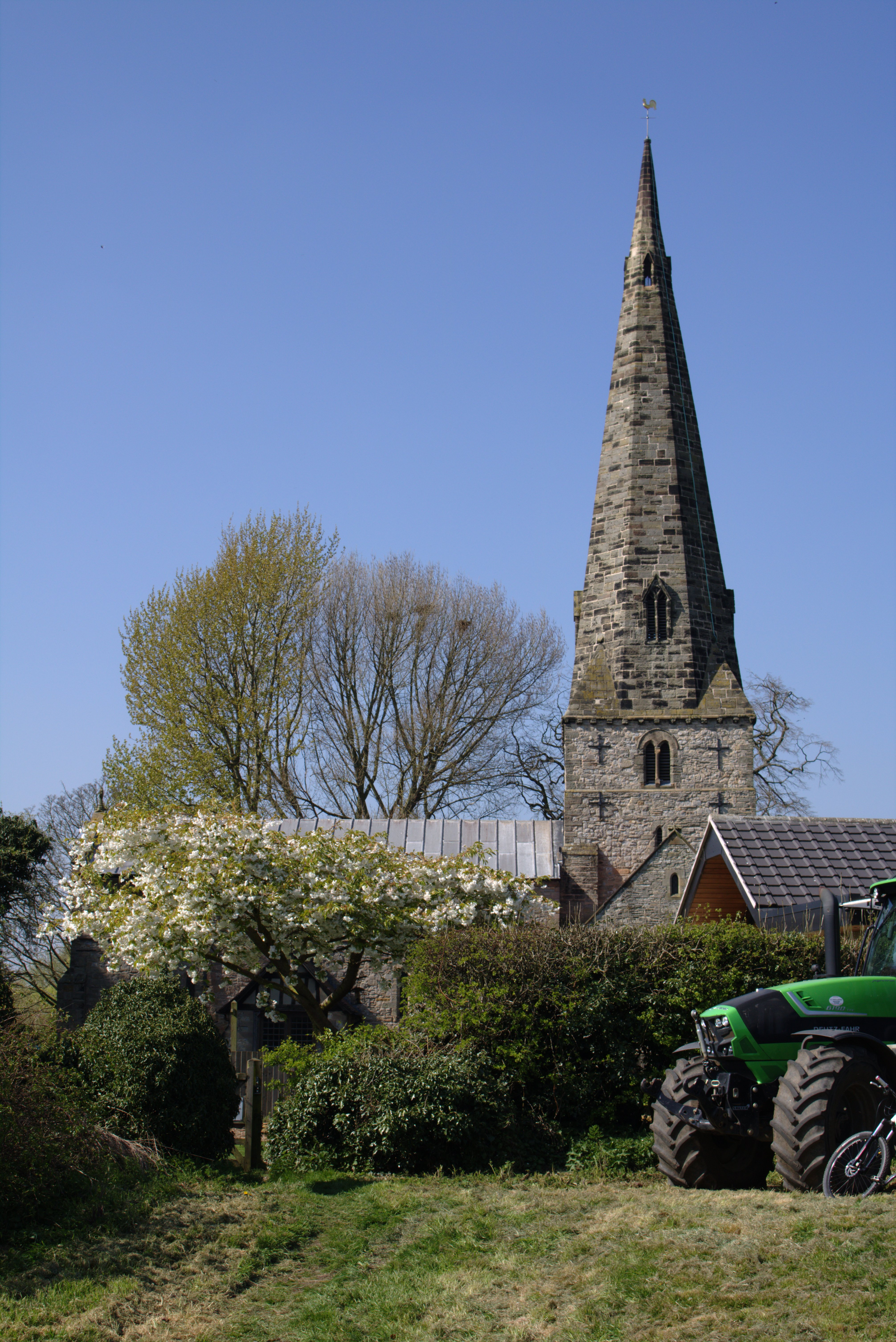
St. James' Church from a nearby field

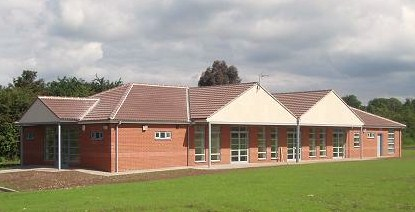
The Village Hall and Community Shop (located at the rear)

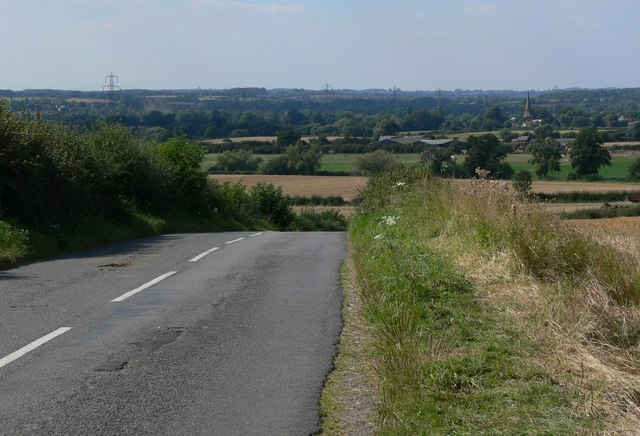
Normanton Lane looking towards Normanton

== See also ==
- Other Normantons
- Church of St. James
- List of Civil Parishes in Nottinghamshire
