= Normanton =

Normanton is the name of:

== England ==
- Normanton, Derby
- South Normanton, Derbyshire
- Temple Normanton, Derbyshire
- Normanton, Leicestershire
- Normanton-on-Cliffe, Lincolnshire
- Normanton, Rutland
- Normanton, West Yorkshire
  - Normanton (electoral ward)
  - Normanton (constituency) (old)
  - Normanton, Pontefract and Castleford (UK Parliament constituency, new)
  - Normanton R.L.F.C., a former semi-professional rugby league club
- Normanton, Wiltshire
- Normanton le Heath, Leicestershire
- Normanton on Soar, Nottinghamshire
- Normanton-on-the-Wolds, Nottinghamshire
- Normanton on Trent, Nottinghamshire

== Australia ==
- Normanton, Queensland

== Other ==
- Normanton incident – a maritime incident off the coast of Japan in 1886
- Earl of Normanton

== See also ==
- Normantown (disambiguation)
