= Listed buildings in Normanton on Soar =

Normanton on Soar is a civil parish in the Rushcliffe district of Nottinghamshire, England. The parish contains five listed buildings that are recorded in the National Heritage List for England. Of these, one is listed at Grade I, the highest of the three grades, and the others are at Grade II, the lowest grade. The parish contains the village of Normanton on Soar and the surrounding area. All the listed buildings are in the village, and consist of a church, two cottages, a dovecote and a farmhouse.

== Key ==
Grade	Criteria
I	Buildings of exceptional interest, sometimes considered to be internationally important
II	Buildings of national importance and special interest

== Buildings ==
Name and location	Photograph	Date	Notes	Grade
St James' Church; 52.80130°N 1.23203°W		13th century	The church has been altered and extended through the centuries, including a restoration in 1899–90 when the north transept was added. The church is built in stone, with some timber framing, and has roofs of tile and slate. It consists of a nave with a clerestory, a south porch, north and south transepts, a chancel, and a steeple at the crossing. The steeple has two stages, clasping buttresses, a corbel table, and a broach spire with two tiers of lucarnes.	I
75 Main Street; 52.80222°N 1.23223°W		15th century	The cottage is of cruck construction, and is timber framed with red brick nogging and some stone, partly on a stone plinth, and with a thatched roof. The gable end facing the street has close studding, two storeys, the upper storey jettied, and two bays. It contains a doorway, and a cross-casement window in each floor. Along the sides is a mix of casement and horizontally-sliding sash windows, a doorway with a trellis porch, and an eyebrow dormer. Inside the cottage are three crucks.	II
65 Main Street; 52.80296°N 1.23400°W		Mid 17th century	The cottage has a timber framed core, encased in whitewashed brick, and it has a thatched roof with red brick coped gables and kneelers. There is a single storey and attics, and six bays. On the front is a doorway, and a mix of casement and horizontally-sliding sash windows, some with segmental-arched heads, and in the attic are four eyebrow dormers.	II
Dovecote; 52.80318°N 1.23521°W	—	17th century	The dovecote is in stone and red brick, and has a slate roof with shaped brick gables. There is a single storey and a loft, and a single bay. It contains a single opening with a quoined surround and a doorway, and inside are plaster nesting boxes.	II
Home Farmhouse; 52.80215°N 1.23262°W	—	Mid 18th century	The farmhouse is in red brick, with some blue brick and stone, on a stone plinth, with floor bands, dentilled and dogtooth eaves, and a tile roof. There are two storeys, attics and cellars, and two bays. The windows are sashes, and there is a blocked cellar opening with a chequered segmental arch.	II
