= Listed buildings in Hawksworth, Nottinghamshire =

Hawksworth is a civil parish in the Rushcliffe district of Nottinghamshire, England. The parish contains six listed buildings that are recorded in the National Heritage List for England. Of these, one is listed at Grade II*, the middle of the three grades, and the others are at Grade II, the lowest grade. The parish contains the village of Hawksworth and the surrounding area. All the listed buildings are in the village, and consist of a church, its former rectory, houses, farmhouses and associated structures, and farm buildings.

== Key ==
| Grade | Criteria |
|---|---|
| II* | Particularly important buildings of more than special interest |
| II | Buildings of national importance and special interest |

== Buildings ==
| Name and location | Photograph | Date | Notes | Grade |
|---|---|---|---|---|
| Church of St Mary and All Saints; 52.98320°N 0.88003°W | | 13th century | The oldest part of the church is the west tower, the nave was rebuilt in 1812–13, the north aisles in 1837, and the chancel in 1851. The tower has two stages, the lower part is in stone, and the upper parts are in red brick. It has buttresses, a chamfered eaves band, and an embattled parapet with crocketed pinnacles. On the west side is a doorway with a moulded surround, shafts with round bases and capitals, and a hood mould. In the upper stage, the south front contains a re-set 11th-century tympanum with an inscription and an Adoration of the Cross, above which is a clock face, and on each side is a two-light bell opening. The body of the church is in stone, and attached to the chancel are an organ chamber and a vestry. | II* |
| Hawksworth Manor and pigeoncote 52.98189°N 0.87712°W | | Mid 17th century | The manor house was extended in the 19th century and a rear wing was added in 1910. It is in stone and brick on a plinth, with stone dressings and tile roofs. There are two storeys and attics, and an L-shaped plan, with a front range of five unequal bays. On the northwest front is a two-storey porch with a chamfered plinth and a gable with bargeboards, and the windows are casements. On the garden front is a stair light and two gabled dormers, and in the angle is a square parapeted porch. The pigeoncote dates from 1665, it has two storeys, a square plan, a string course, and a two-stage square timber glover with a pyramidal lead roof and a finial. It contains an opening and doorways with segmental heads, a datestone, and square pigeonholes, and adjoining it is a stable range. | II |
| Yew Tree Farmhouse and wall 52.98320°N 0.88109°W | — | Late 17th century | The farmhouse is in brick on a deep stone plinth, with stone dressings, quoins, a floor band, an eaves band, dentilled eaves, and a pantile roof. There are two storeys and attics, a front range of four unequal bays, and a rear wing. The windows are a mix of casements, some with mullions, and horizontally-sliding sashes, the windows on the front with segmental heads. The garden wall is in brick with a partial stone plinth, and is about 12 metres (39 ft) long, and to the west is a mud wall with pantile coping 10 metres (33 ft) long. | II |
| Boundary walls, Top Farm; 52.98292°N 0.88059°W | | Late 18th century | The brick boundary wall encloses the garden on its north and west sides, and it was extended in the 19th century. The earlier part, along Top Street, has dentilled stepped brick coping, and contains a pair of square-panelled gate piers with chamfered plinths, moulded bands and caps, and stone obelisk finials, and between them is a pair of scrolled iron gates. The later part is lower and has ramped gabled brick coping. The wall extends for about 50 metres (160 ft). | II |
| Hawksworth Place and garden walls 52.98308°N 0.87969°W | | c. 1820 | The rectory, later a private house, is in brick, partly stuccoed, on a stone plinth, with stone dressings and a hipped slate roof. There are two storeys, the main block has a square plan and fronts of three and four bays, and to the left is a service wing. Segmental steps lead up to a central Doric portico and a doorway with a fanlight, and the windows are sashes. The garden wall to the southwest is in brick with gabled coping, and the wall to the east has ramped slab coping, and it contains an elliptical-headed doorway. | II |
| Farm buildings, Top Farm; 52.98272°N 0.88024°W | | 1837 | The buildings at the model farm are in brick, with chamfered eaves and pantile roofs, and are arranged around a square courtyard. At the entrance is a three-storey tower with coped gables, kneelers and finials, and on the roof is a square cupola with chamfered openings, and a lead ogee dome. In the ground floor is a doorway with a four-centred arched head and a hood mould, and above it are casement windows, the lower window mullioned. The tower is flanked by single-storey wings with hipped roofs. Elsewhere, the buildings are in one and two storeys, and include stables, one containing an elliptical-headed carriage entrance, and cartsheds. | II |
