= Normantown =

Normantown may refer to:

- Normantown, West Virginia
- Normantown, Illinois, a former settlement in Wheatland Township, Will County, Illinois
- Normantown, Georgia
