= Charles Thoroton =

Lieutenant-Colonel Charles Thoroton CMG
- Born: Charles Julian Thoroton; 9 August 1875
- Died: 17 January 1939 (aged 63)
- Allegiance: Royal Navy
- Branch: Royal Navy
- Rank: Admiral
- Commands: British Naval Intelligence
- Conflicts: First World War

Lieutenant-Colonel Charles Julian Thoroton, CMG (9 August 1875 – 17 January 1939) was the Chief of British Naval Intelligence for the Mediterranean from Gibraltar (and Spain), to North Africa and Greece, between 1913 and 1919. He reported to Admiral Sir Reginald (Blinker) Hall, RN, Head of Room 40. Thoroton was described as one of Winston Churchill's "brilliant confederacy – whose names even now are better wrapt in mystery" (The World Crisis 1911–1914, Chapter XX.).
