= Robert Thoroton =

17th-century antiquary from Rushcliffe, Nottinghamshire, England

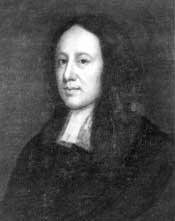
Robert Thoroton

Dr Robert Thoroton (4 October 1623 – c. 21 November 1678) was an English antiquary, mainly remembered for his county history, The Antiquities of Nottinghamshire (1677).

== Life ==
Thoroton belonged to an old Nottinghamshire family, which took its name from Thoroton, near Newark. He resided mainly at another village in the same neighbourhood, Car Colston, where he practised as a physician, and lived the life of a country gentleman. He took little part in the Civil War, but his sympathies were with the royalists. However, as a magistrate he was very active in persecuting the Quakers. In return, the Quakers were active in recording the occasions on which he imposed heavy fines on poor members of their faith, often depriving them of the tools to make a living.

In 1667 Thoroton, aided by a band of helpers, began work on his great county history, The Antiquities of Nottinghamshire. This was published in London in 1677. It was dedicated to the eminent antiquarian William Dugdale, and illustrated by engravings by Wenceslaus Hollar. It was Dugdale who had urged Thoroton to complete the work of history begun by Thoroton's father-in-law.

Some six years before his death, Thoroton commissioned an elaborate coffin carved from red Mansfield stone, and incised with the coats of arms of his various ancestors. He was buried at Car Colston in the coffin; but in 1845, during restoration work on the chancel of St Mary's Church, it was unearthed and opened. Thoroton's skull was removed and placed in a shop in the village as a "curiosity". The vandalism was subsequently discovered, and the vicar ordered the remains to be collected, replaced within the coffin and reinterred.

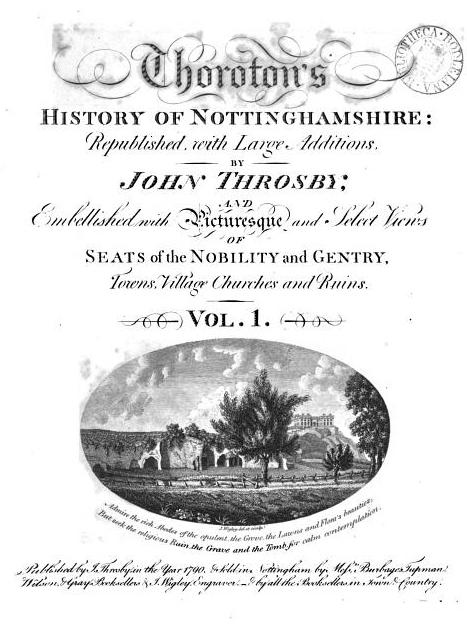
Title page of John Throsby's new edition of Thoroton's earlier History of Nottinghamshire, 1797

In 1797 a new edition of the Antiquities, expanded to three volumes, was published by John Throsby (1740–1803).

== Legacy ==
The Thoroton Society of Nottinghamshire was founded in 1897, and named in honour of the antiquarian, its object being to promote the study of the history and antiquities of Nottinghamshire. It publishes an annual volume of Transactions, and a separate Record Series of primary source materials.

A brass plaque to the memory of Thoroton is in Car Colston church.

Myles Thoroton Hildyard, a descendant of Robert Thoroton's brother and heir, who lived at Flintham Hall, Flintham, served as president of the Thoroton Society for many years until his death in 2005.

== See also ==
- Charles Thoroton
- Thoroton Society of Nottinghamshire
