= John Throsby =

English antiquary

John Throsby (1740–1803) was an English antiquary.

== Life ==
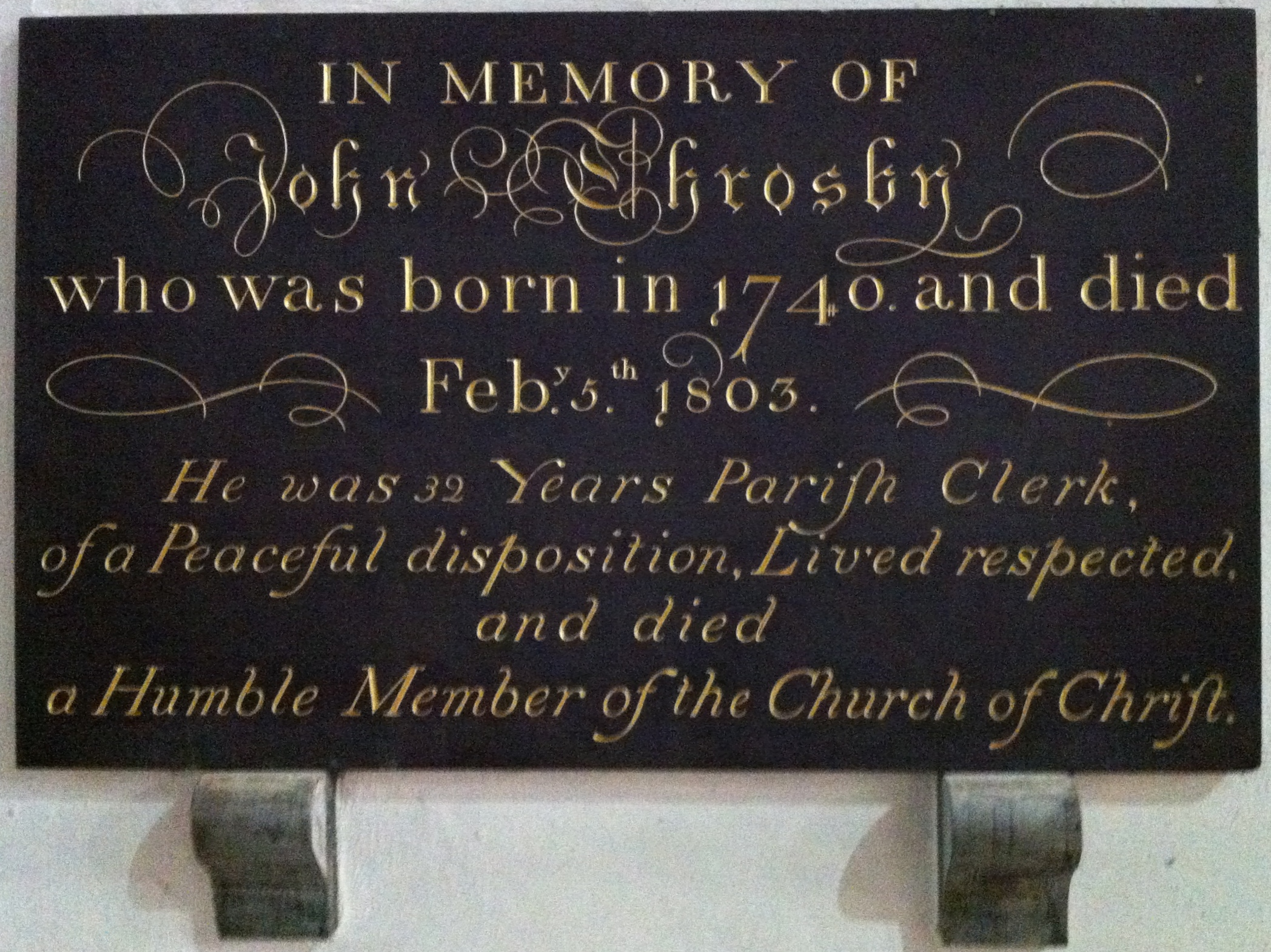
Memorial to John Throsby in Leicester Cathedral

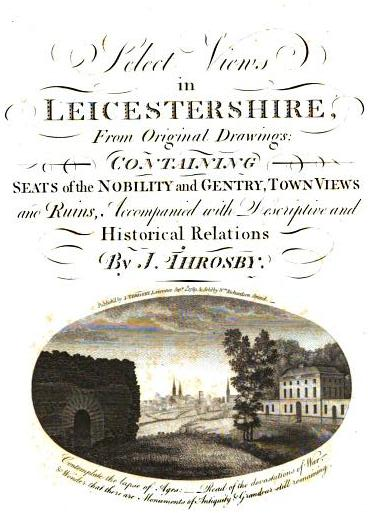
Title page of Throsby's Supplementary Volume to the Leicestershire Views, containing a Series of Excursions to the Villages and Places of Note in that County, 1790

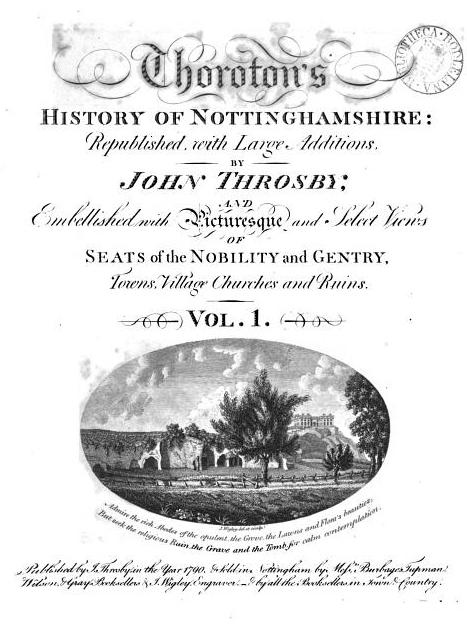
Title page of Throsby's new edition of Robert Thoroton's earlier History of Nottinghamshire, 1797

The son of Nicholas Throsby, alderman of Leicester and mayor in 1759, by Martha Mason, his second wife, was born at Leicester on 21 December 1740, and baptised at St. Martin's Church there on 13 January following. In 1770 he was appointed parish clerk of St. Martin's, which office he held until his death.

He early turned his attention to the study of local history and antiquities, and in 1777, at the age of thirty-seven, published his first work, The Memoirs of the Town and County of Leicester, which was issued at Leicester in six duodecimo volumes. In 1789 he brought out a quarto volume of Select Views in Leicestershire, from Original Drawings, containing historical and descriptive accounts of castles, religious houses, and seats in that county, and in the following year a Supplementary Volume to the Leicestershire Views, containing a Series of Excursions to the Villages and Places of Note in that County. This was followed in 1791 by The History and Antiquities of the Ancient Town of Leicester (Leicester, 4to). He also republished Robert Thoroton's Nottinghamshire, with large additions (3 vols. 4to, 1790, new edit. 1797).

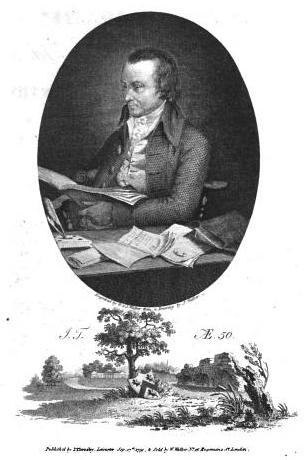
Portrait of John Throsby at age 50, published 1790

John Nichols incorporated most of Throsby's work in his History of Leicestershire. He describes him as "a man of strong natural genius, who, during the vicissitudes of a life remarkably chequered, rendered himself conspicuous as a draughtsman and topographer." In later life Throsby was in indifferent circumstances. He attempted many expedients to maintain his family, few of which were successful, but in his later years he was assisted by friends. He died, after a lingering illness, on 5 February 1803, and was buried on the 8th at St. Martin's, Leicester. Over the old vestry door is a tablet to his memory. He married at St. Martin's, on 29 October 1761, Ann Godfrey, by whom he had five sons and five daughters. His widow survived him, and died on 1 October 1813.

Besides those mentioned above, his works are: 1. Letter to the Earl of Leicester on the Recent Discovery of the Roman Cloaca at Leicester, with Some Thoughts on the Jewry Wall, Leicester, 8vo, 1793. 2. Thoughts on the Provincial Corps raised, and now raising in support of the British Constitution, at this awful period, 1795. An engraved portrait of Throsby at the age of fifty is prefixed to his Excursions and History of Leicester.
