= Denton, Lincolnshire =

Village and civil parish in the South Kesteven district of Lincolnshire, England

Coordinates: 52.8826°N 0.7119°W

Denton
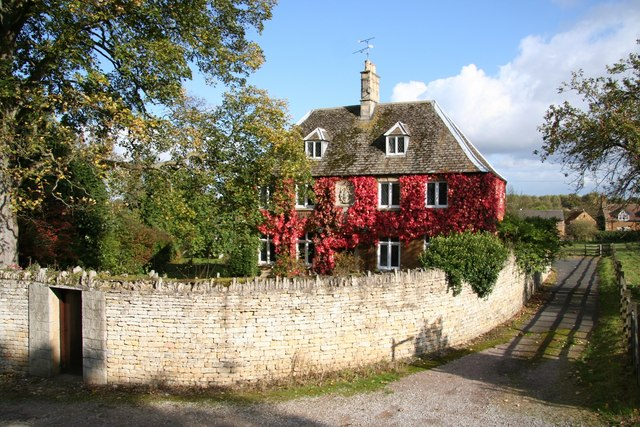
- Leys house

- Location within Lincolnshire
- Population: 273 (2011)
- OS grid reference: SK867326
  - London: 95 mi (153 km) S
- Civil parish: Denton
- District: South Kesteven
- Shire county: Lincolnshire
- Region: East Midlands
- Country: England
- Sovereign state: United Kingdom
- Post town: GRANTHAM
- Postcode district: NG32
- Dialling code: 01476
- Police: Lincolnshire
- Fire: Lincolnshire
- Ambulance: East Midlands

Denton is a village and civil parish in the South Kesteven district of Lincolnshire, England. The population of the civil parish was 273 at the 2011 census. It is situated approximately 3 miles (5 km) both south-west of Grantham and west from the A1 road.

== History ==
The Denton name derives from the Old English 'dene+tun', meaning "village in a valley," but in Domesday it is written as "Dentune". Denton is the site of an ancient Roman settlement. It may also be a site of the Beaker culture, based on some archaeological finds made.

=== Iron industry ===
Iron ore was quarried in the parish from about 1888 onwards. Quarrying began north of Woolsthorpe Road close to the boundary with Woolsthorpe, continuing south of the road and finishing there in 1910. The ore was taken by narrow gauge tramway to the Great Northern Railway branch at Woolsthorpe. Quarrying began again in 1918 close to the Harston road and the boundary with Harston in Leicestershire. Until 1930 this was south of the road. By 1918 the Great Northern branch had been extended to a point near Socketwell Plantation to serve quarries at Harston. A narrow-gauge tramway was extended to serve the new Denton quarries from the Great Northern terminus. Quarrying was carried on north of the road from 1925 to 1931 and began again in Denton Park closer to Denton village, south of the road, in 1940. The Denton Park quarry closed in February 1974. The final quarry face was close to the A607. In 1948 the narrow gauge tramway was converted to standard gauge and connected to the branch railway so that the ore no longer had to be tipped from narrow gauge wagons into standard gauge wagons. Steam locomotives were used until 1967 when a diesel took over.

The first quarries were worked by hand with the aid of explosives, From 1918 steam diggers began to be introduced and from 1938 diesel and electric machines.

== Geography ==
Denton is situated just north off the main A607 road between Grantham and Melton Mowbray. Nearby villages include Harlaxton, Barrowby and Woolsthorpe. Denton is a 3 miles east from Belvoir Castle. The civil parish covers approximately 2,600 acres (11 km^{2}).

== Community ==
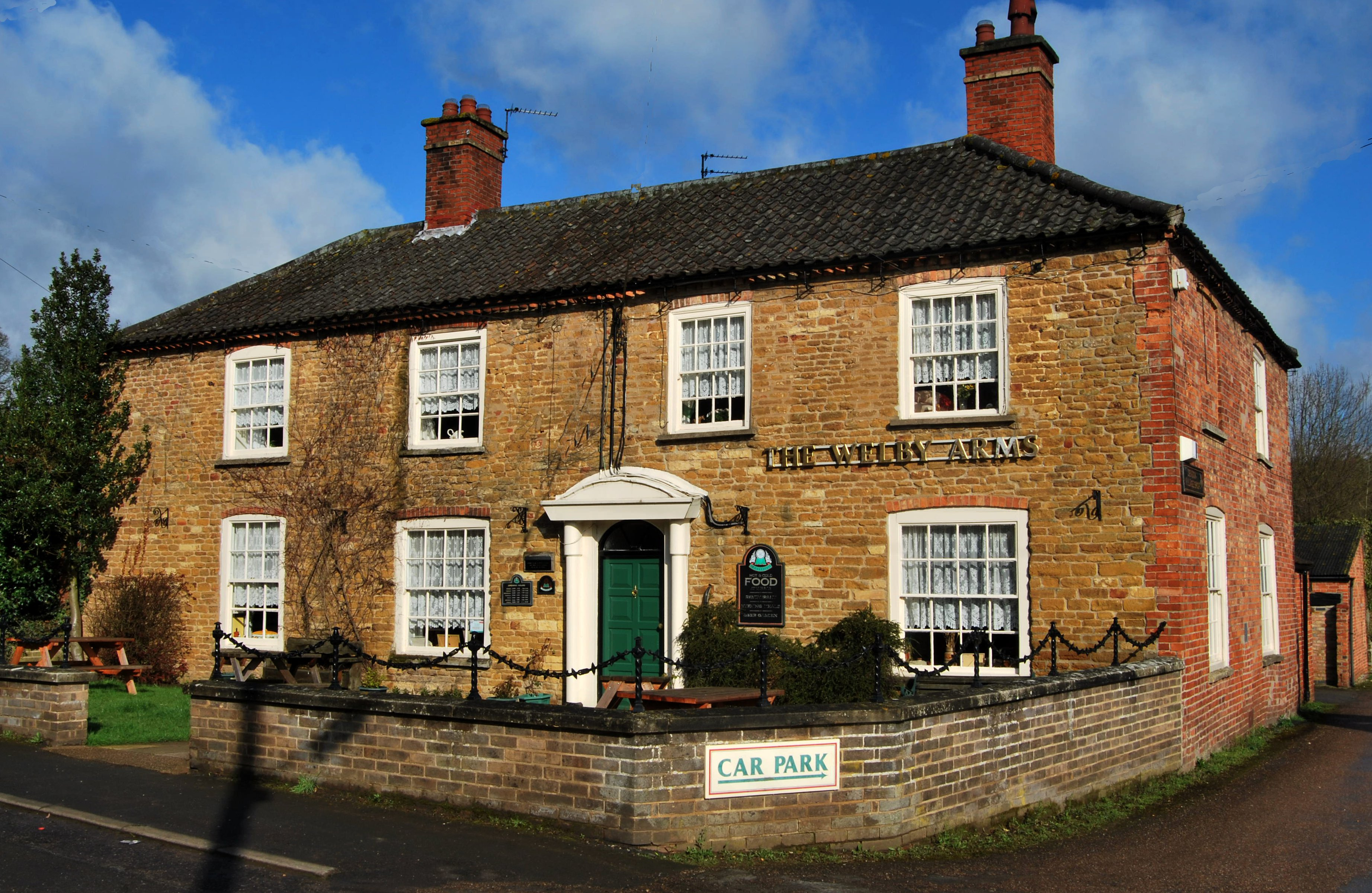
Welby Arms Denton.JPG

In 1984 Denton held its first street market, proceeds from which were equally divided between the Church, the School and the Village Hall. The street market is now held every year on the first Bank holiday Monday in May. The 2013 event was the 27th, (the 2001 and 2012 markets being cancelled because of foot and mouth and bad weather respectively) with over 150 stalls, food outlets, children's entertainment, and traditional village sports. Since the 2020 street market was cancelled due to Covid-19, the street market has not taken place again as of 2026.

The ecclesiastical parish is Denton, part of The Harlaxton Group of the Deanery of Grantham. The 2013 incumbent is the Rev'd Keith Hanson. The nearest non-conformist church is the Methodist chapel at Grantham.

The village public house, the Welby Arms, is an early 19th-century building constructed of coursed ironstone rubble, with the side walls of red brick, and although a number of alterations were made in the 20th century, it has been Grade II listed since 1979.

Denton has a village hall, managed by a parish council, but no village shop. It is served by the daily No. 9 bus service from Grantham.

== Landmarks ==
=== St Andrew's Church ===
Denton Grade I listed Anglican parish church is dedicated to St Andrew. Restored in 1888, it is mainly Perpendicular in style. In the south aisle is a table-tomb with an effigy of John Blyth, his wife Margaret and his six children; a monument to Richard Welby (d. 1713) is in the north aisle.

The church originally had only four bells, but now has six. The original bells were the now No.1, No.3, No.4 and No.5. These were augmented by two bells in 1782 by recasting four bells and adding the new No.2 and No.6 (the tenor). The bells were re-hung in 1855 by Denton wheelwright and machine-maker John Caborn. In 1994 the bells were again re-hung in metal frames by Hayward Mills Associates.

=== Denton Park ===
Denton Manor ( 52°52'58.17"N 0°43'15.72"W ) house is a Grade II listed 17th-century house standing in Denton Park. It is constructed of coursed ironstone rubble with ashlar quoins and Collyweston diminishing coursed slate roof in two storeys to an L-shaped plan with a 5 bay frontage. It was built for Sir Bruno Welby, with extensive alterations and additions in 1953 and 1965 by Marshall Sisson.

Another larger house, generally known as Denton Hall, was rebuilt by the Welby family in 1879 on the site of an earlier house to the designs of architect Sir Arthur Blomfield, was restored after a fire in 1906 but demolished in 1940. At one time it was owned by Sir William Welby-Gregory, 4th Baronet, MP for Grantham and South Lincolnshire and his well-known wife Victoria, Lady Welby, the philosopher of language, musician and water-colour artist. She was followed in 1887 by their son Sir Charles Welby, 5th Baronet, MP for Newark and Under-Secretary of State for War.

The park also houses a series of large ponds and a freshwater spring, St. Christopher's Well, which is hidden in a grotto built from fossils and shells in 1823. Within the cave is an inscription: "faery of the well".

=== Denton Reservoir ===
The main engineering feature of the Grantham Canal, which opened in 1797, was Harlaxton Drift near Grantham. This was a deep cutting which was built just wide enough for one-way traffic. Two passing places, where the canal was made wider, were added in 1801. Two reservoirs were also needed to feed the canal, one of which was built at Denton, close to the canal, and the other at Knipton, about 3 miles away. Both were on the Belvoir Estate, and the job of building them, along with the cutting, was the responsibility of William King, the agent for the Duke of Rutland.

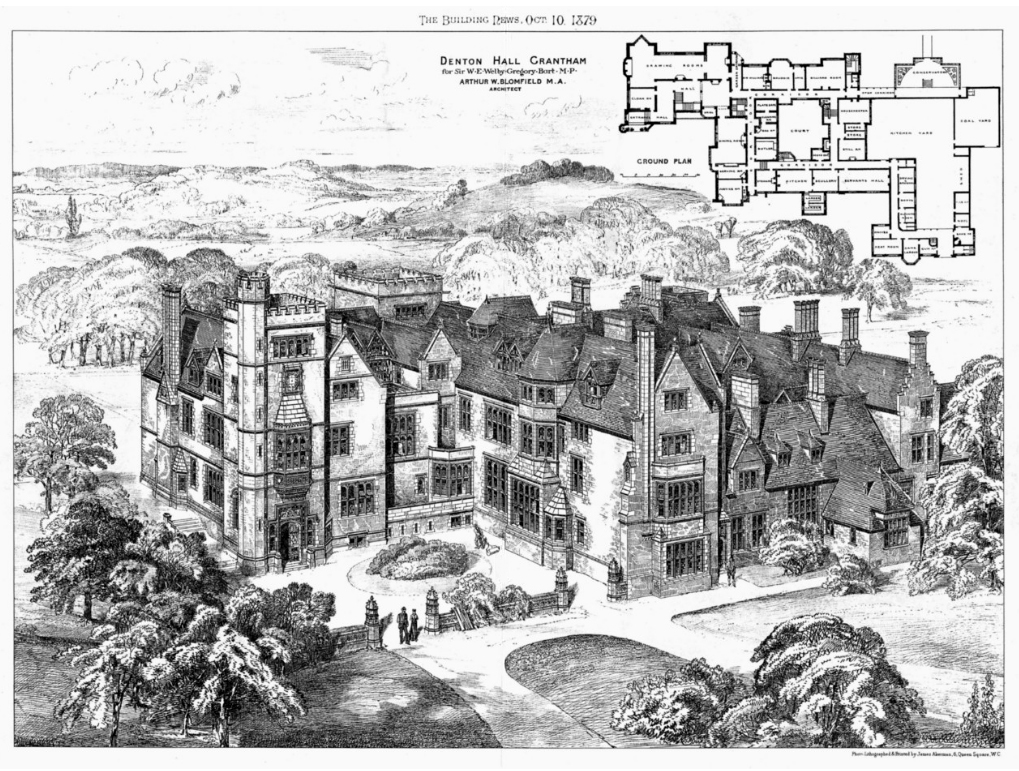
Denton Hall illustration and plan, 1879

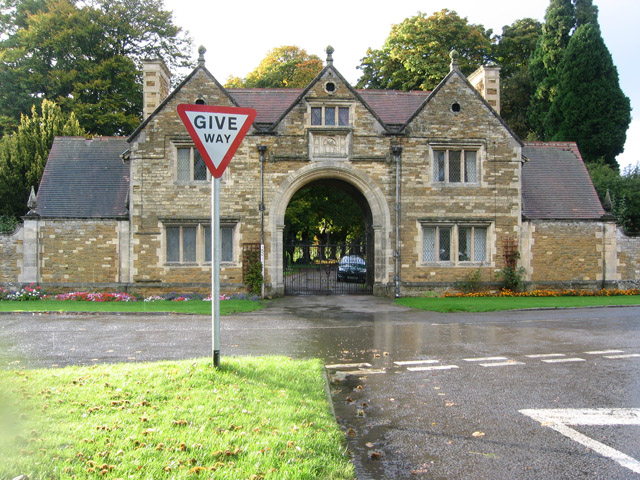
Denton Park gatehouse

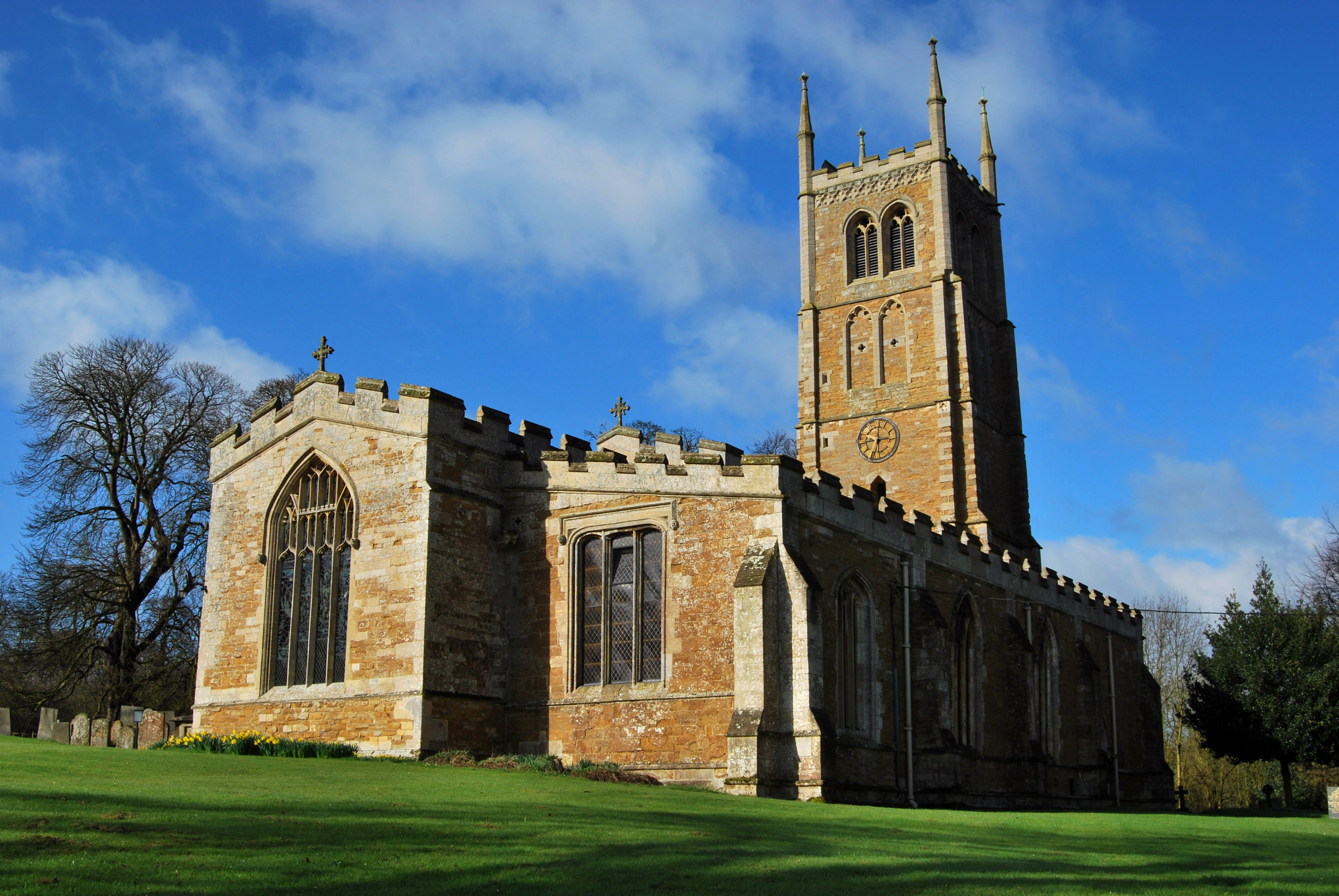
Church of St Andrew, Denton
