= Casthorpe =

Hamlet in Lincolnshire, England

Coordinates: 52.9104°N 0.723735°W

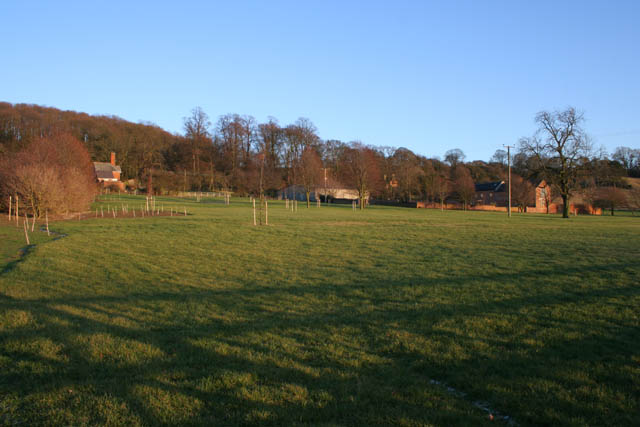
- Casthorpe Lodge

- Location within Lincolnshire
- OS grid reference: SK859355
  - London: 100 mi (160 km) S
- District: South Kesteven
- Shire county: Lincolnshire
- Region: East Midlands
- Country: England
- Sovereign state: United Kingdom
- Post town: GRANTHAM
- Postcode district: NG32
- Dialling code: 01476
- Police: Lincolnshire
- Fire: Lincolnshire
- Ambulance: East Midlands
- UK Parliament: Sleaford and North Hykeham

Casthorpe is hamlet in the civil parish of Barrowby and the South Kesteven District of Lincolnshire, England. It is 23 miles (40 km) south-southwest from the city and county town of Lincoln, 3 miles (5 km) west from Grantham town centre, and 1 mile (1.6 km) west from Barrowby village.

== History ==
There are two medieval sites at Casthorpe, defining the two former settlements of East and West Casthorpe, both recorded in 14th-century subsidy rolls. East Casthorpe (SK869355), with no evidence apart from earlier maps, was sited at or around Casthorpe Lodge. West Casthorpe (SK861357), was sited at Casthorpe House Farm, evidenced by aerial photographs faintly showing earthworks, enclosures, ridges and furrows, cropmarks, a possible moat, and possible crofts. Both settlements are mentioned in the Domesday Book, listed as "Caschingetorp", "Chaschingetorp", "Chaschintorp" and "Kaschingetorp" as four probable manors covering the Casthorpe settlement.

Kelly's Directory listed, as the only trades in Casthorpe, three farmers in 1855, two farmers in 1885, and one farmer in 1933. The 1872 White's Directory listed three farmers who were also graziers.

In 2002 Charles Richard Ferens of Casthorpe Lodge became High Sheriff of Lincolnshire.

== Geography ==
Casthorpe is a settlement of three farms, two rows of converted cottages, Longmeadow House and Casthorpe Lodge. The hamlet is centred to the north of the junction of Denton Lane and Casthorpe Road, and is at the foot of the Casthorpe Hills which rise to 384 feet (117 m) above sea level, and mark an eastern edge of the Vale of Belvoir. The Grantham Canal is at the south of the hamlet, crossed by Casthorpe Bridge. The Old Beck, a stream which runs north from the Grantham Canal, flows through the east of Casthorpe below Casthorpe Hills, eventually reaching the River Witham at Marston as the Foston Beck. A public footpath in the south of Casthorpe runs from the Grantham Canal, then along and over Old Beck, then east at the south of Casthorpe Lodge, ascends Casthorpe Hills, then to Westry Corner at the south of Barrowby. A second public footpath at the north starts at Longmeadow House on Woolsthorpe Lane at the west of Casthorpe, runs east through Casthorpe Farm, over Denton Lane, past Coe Farm, across the Old Beck, then ascends Casthorpe Hills, finishing at the north of the churchyard of All Saints Church, Barrowby.

== Landmarks ==
There are four listed structures in Casthorpe. The two-storey Casthorpe Farm House on Denton Lane is of brick, partly rendered, and dating to the early 18th century. Casthorpe Farmhouse on Casthorpe Road is a rendered and whitewashed two-storey house dating to c.1800 with an adjoining single storey range. Casthorpe Lodge on Casthorpe Road is a two-storey L-plan former farmhouse dating to c1770, with an early 19th-century U-shape Ha-ha.
