= Listed buildings in Kinoulton =

Kinoulton is a civil parish in the Rushcliffe district of Nottinghamshire, England. The parish contains 13 listed buildings that are recorded in the National Heritage List for England. Of these, one is listed at Grade II*, the middle of the three grades, and the others are at Grade II, the lowest grade. The parish contains the village of Kinoulton and the surrounding countryside. The Grantham Canal runs through the parish, and the listed buildings associated with it are a bridge and five mile posts. The other listed buildings consist of a church, headstones in the churchyard of a former, different church, houses and farmhouses.

== Key ==
Grade	Criteria
II*	Particularly important buildings of more than special interest
II	Buildings of national importance and special interest

== Buildings ==
Name and location	Photograph	Date	Notes	Grade
St Luke's Church; 52.86978°N 0.99646°W		1792–93	The church is in red brick on a stone plinth, with stone dressings and a slate roof with a coped gable. It consists of a nave, a chancel with an apse, a northeast vestry and a west tower. The tower has three stages, bands, a doorway and a window on the west side, a clock face on the south side, round-arched bell openings with imposts and keystones, a moulded eaves cornice, and a low pitched roof with a weathervane. The windows along the sides of the naves and the east window are round-headed with an impost band and keystones.	II*
Headstones, former Church of St Wilfred; 52.86711°N 1.01801°W		Late 18th century	The headstones in the churchyard of the former church are mainly in slate. There are 34 headstones, dated between 1692 and 1797, and they have various shapes, designs and inscriptions.	II
Clark's Bridge; 52.86255°N 0.95791°W		Late 18th century	An accommodation bridge over the Grantham Canal, it consists of a single elliptical arch. The bridge is in red brick with blue brick copings, and has a three course band at the base of the parapet, and swept sides with square end piers.	II
Mile post north of Irish Jack's Bridge; 52.87819°N 1.00724°W		Late 18th century	The milepost is on the east side of the Grantham Canal. It is in cast iron, and consists of a post with rounded top and a moulded edge. Riveted on it is a plate with raised letters indicating that it is 11 miles from the River Trent.	II
Mile post south of Irish Jack's Bridge; 52.87057°N 1.00082°W		Late 18th century	The milepost is on the northeast side of the Grantham Canal. It is in cast iron, and consists of a post with rounded top and a moulded edge. Riveted on it is a plate with raised letters indicating that it is 11½ miles from the River Trent.	II
Mile post 350 metres southeast of Main Street; 52.86773°N 0.99298°W		Late 18th century	The milepost is on the north side of the Grantham Canal. It is in cast iron, and consists of a post with rounded top and a moulded edge. Riveted on it is a plate with raised letters indicating that it is 12 miles from the River Trent.	II
Mile post 1200 metres southeast of Main Street; 52.86328°N 0.98469°W		Late 18th century	The milepost is on the east side of the Grantham Canal. It is in cast iron, and consists of a post with rounded top and a moulded edge. Riveted on it is a plate with raised letters indicating that it is 12½ miles from the River Trent.	II
Mile post east of Clark's Bridge; 52.86258°N 0.95454°W		Late 18th century	The milepost is on the northeast side of the Grantham Canal. It is in cast iron, and consists of a post with rounded top and a moulded edge. Riveted on it is a plate with raised letters indicating that it is 14¼ miles from the River Trent.	II
Elm Farmhouse; 52.86775°N 1.00532°W		Late 18th or early 19th century	The farmhouse is in red brick, with an eaves cornice, and a pantile roof with coped gables on square kneelers. There are two storeys and attics, a main range with a symmetrical front of three bays, and a lower two-storey single-bay extension on the left. The doorway has a fanlight, the windows are sashes, and all the openings have segmental heads. In the extension is a bay window.	II
Sausethorpe Farmhouse; 52.87038°N 0.99150°W	—	Early 19th century	The farmhouse, which was extended later in the century, is in red brick, with dentilled eaves, an eaves cornice and tile roofs. There are two storeys, the main range has a symmetrical front of three bays, and on each side is a lower two-bay extension. In the centre is an arched doorway with a fanlight, and the windows are sashes, some with segmental heads.	II
The Manor House; 52.87359°N 0.98826°W		Early 19th century	The house is in red brick with a tile roof. There are three storeys, a symmetrical front of three bays, and a lower gabled rear wing. In the centre is a gabled porch in timber and brick, and the windows are sashes.	II
Wolds Farmhouse; 52.86154°N 1.02727°W	—	Early 19th century	The farmhouse is stuccoed and has a hipped slate roof. There are two storeys and a symmetrical front of two bays, with recessed elliptical-arched panels between the bays. The central doorway has pilasters, a fanlight, and a triangular pediment. The windows on the front are sashes with moulded surrounds, and elsewhere there are casement windows.	II
The Old Vicarage and wall 52.86973°N 0.99332°W	—	1849–50	The vicarage, later a private house, was designed by T. C. Hine in Gothic style. It is in red brick with stone dressings and has a slate roof with ridge tiles and coped gables and kneelers. There are two storeys and attics, an asymmetrical plan, and a single-storey range linking the house to the coach house. There are multiple gables, and most of the windows are lancets. The doorway is arched, with a moulded surround and small attached columns with foliate caps. The wall along the west boundary is in brick with saddleback copings, and contains decorative moulded bricks and quatrefoil motifs.	II
