= Harston, Leicestershire =

Village in Leicestershire, England

Coordinates: 52.878°N 0.754°W

Harston
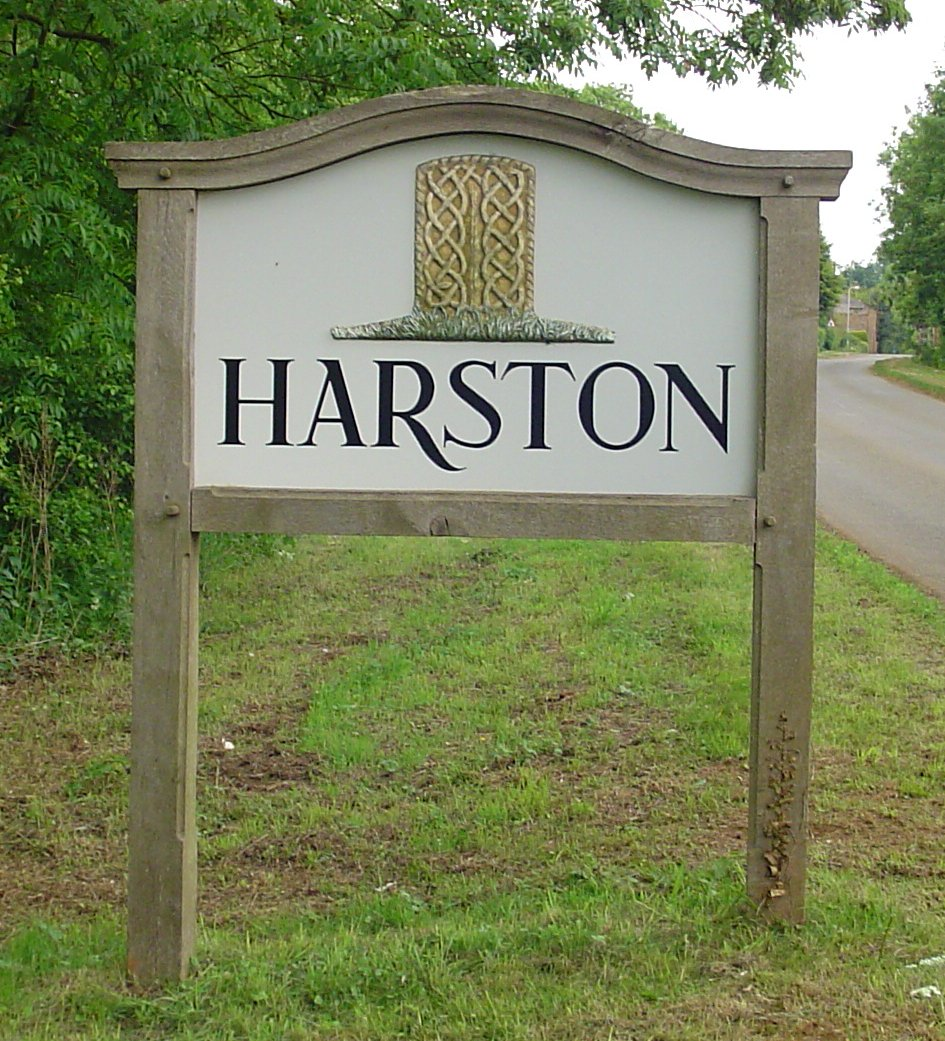
- Harston village sign

- Location within Leicestershire
- OS grid reference: SK839318
  - London: 100 mi (160 km) S
- Civil parish: Belvoir
- District: Melton
- Shire county: Leicestershire
- Region: East Midlands
- Country: England
- Sovereign state: United Kingdom
- Post town: GRANTHAM
- Postcode district: NG32
- Dialling code: 01476
- Police: Leicestershire
- Fire: Leicestershire
- Ambulance: East Midlands
- UK Parliament: Melton and Syston

Harston is a crossroads village and former civil parish, now in the parish of Belvoir, in the Melton district, in Leicestershire, England, near the border with Lincolnshire. The nearest town is Grantham, about 6 miles (10 km) to the north-east. It once contained several quarries for iron ore. Part of the village borders Lincolnshire. In 1931 the parish had a population of 182. On 1 April 1936 the parish was abolished and merged with Belvoir.

== The Church ==
The Church of England church dedicated to St Michael and All Angels, the only place of worship in the village, is a Grade II* listed building.

The oldest part appears to be the three-stage tower, probably from the earlier half of the 14th century. This is supported on angle buttresses. The chancel dates from 1871 and the nave from 1888.

The church belongs to High Framland group of six parishes, whose rector is Rev. David Cowie. The Rectory is in Wymondham.

== Transport ==
Harston is served by three weekday buses a day between Melton Mowbray and Grantham. The nearest railway station to Harston is Grantham (6 miles, 10 km). The main A607 road between Melton Mowbray and Grantham runs to the south of the village.

== History ==
=== Place name ===
The name of the village derives from the Old English hār-tūn meaning grey or boundary stone.

=== Domesday Book ===
At the time of the Domesday Book (1086) Harston, like Knipton to the west, was part of the Manor of Croxton Kerrial, which was owned by the King (William I)

=== Iron ore ===
Harston was the last place in Leicestershire where iron ore was quarried. This took place extensively to the north, east and south of the village from 1889 to 1972.

Stanton Ironworks Company had started quarrying in 1883 at Woolsthorpe-by-Belvoir, just over the border in Lincolnshire to the north of Harston. The company opened its first quarry in Harston in 1888, south of Denton Road to the east of the village. The ore was taken by a short narrow-gauge tramway to the terminus of a standard-gauge mineral branch of the Great Northern Railway (GNR). The GNR then took it to the Stanton Company's ironworks in Derbyshire. The GNR was later part of the London and North Eastern Railway and then nationalised in 1948. The Stanton company opened another quarry to the north of the road in 1889, also served by the same tramway. From 1901 the company quarried to the north of the village on either side of the Woolsthorpe Road. At first the ore from there was taken by another tramway leading to the GNR branch further down the line near the Grantham Canal. This tramway, the last part of which was a rope-worked incline, passed the original Woolsthorpe quarries. Later, when quarrying west of Woolsthorpe Road ended, the quarries east of the road used an extension of the tramway leading to the standard-gauge terminus.

The Harston quarries north of Denton Road were exhausted by 1923, but they had already been extended into the parish of Denton. South of Denton Road, the active quarries between 1918 and 1930 were all in Denton, just to the east of Sewstern Lane. New quarries were opened to the south of the village in that year and later extended into Knipton. So was the tramway to serve them, which in 1947–1948 was converted to standard gauge. Quarrying ceased at Harston in 1972, but the tramway was still used for trains to and from the quarries at Denton for another two years. Until 1948, the ore was tipped from the narrow-gauge trucks into standard-gauge ones at the terminus of the standard-gauge branch, where they were left for a main line railway locomotive to take away. After 1948 the wagons were loaded at the quarry face and taken to the British Railways terminus where they were later picked up by a British railways locomotive. Between 1951 and 1955 there was a quarry to the north-west of the village, not served by the tramway. Ore from it was loaded into lorries, which took it to a tipping dock at the head of the British Railways branch. A small part of the quarry to the south of the village was also worked in that way in the early 1960s. The last two steam engines on the tramway gave way to diesel in 1967.

Quarrying was initially done by hand with the aid of explosives. Steam quarrying machines were introduced from 1917 and replaced by diesel power from 1936. There were also some electric machines used from 1940.

The quarries were owned by Stewarts & Lloyds Minerals Ltd from 1950 and British Steel from 1970. In later years the ore was taken to Scunthorpe for smelting. Traces of the railway and tramways remain. Some fields previously quarried are now at a lower level than the roads, but few other signs of the quarrying remain. There are some company-built cottages near the Denton Road. The engine shed has been removed and re-erected at Rutland Railway Museum, Cottesmore, Rutland. The last two steam locomotives are used on preserved railways.
