= Belvoir, Leicestershire =

Village in Leicestershire, England

Coordinates: 52.89212°N 0.78315°W

Belvoir
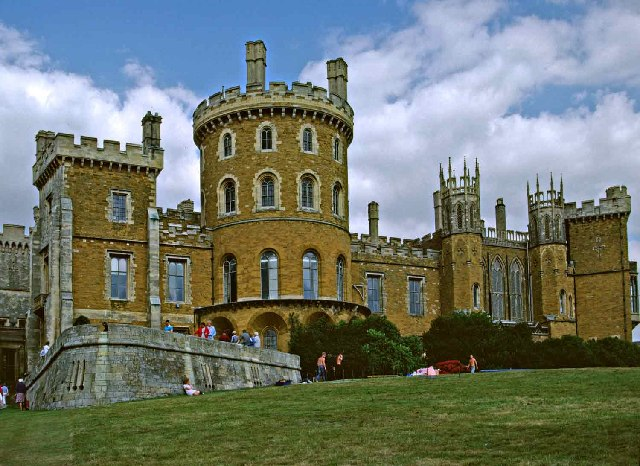
- Belvoir Castle

- Location within Leicestershire
- Population: 263 (Including Knipton and Harston. 2011)
- OS grid reference: SK819334
  - London: 100 mi (160 km) SSE
- Civil parish: Belvoir
- District: Melton
- Shire county: Leicestershire
- Region: East Midlands
- Country: England
- Sovereign state: United Kingdom
- Post town: GRANTHAM
- Postcode district: NG32
- Dialling code: 01476
- Police: Leicestershire
- Fire: Leicestershire
- Ambulance: East Midlands
- UK Parliament: Melton and Syston

Belvoir (/ˈbiːvər/ BEE-vər) is a village and civil parish in the Melton district of Leicestershire, England, close to the county boundary with Lincolnshire. The nearest town is Grantham, 13 kilometres (8 mi) east of the village.

== History ==
The village's name derives from bel-vedeir meaning 'the beautiful view'.

It was the location of Belvoir Priory.

Iron ore was formerly quarried in the parish and details can be found in the articles on Knipton and Harston. The quarries were near Harston, to the south of Knipton and between Belvoir and Knipton.

In December 1936 the civil parish was enlarged by gaining the former area of Harston and Knipton parishes which were abolished.

On 1 April 1965 the parish gained 146 acres from Woolsthorpe by Belvoir in Lincolnshire and 9 acres went the other way.

== Geography ==
The parish includes the villages of Belvoir, Knipton and Harston. Nearby places outside the parish are Woolsthorpe by Belvoir, Redmile, and Croxton Kerrial.

The village is the site of Belvoir Castle, which "stands on a prominent spur jutting northwards" into the Vale of Belvoir.
