= Kinoulton =

Village and civil parish in Nottinghamshire, England

Coordinates: 52.87°N 0.99°W

- Village and civil parish
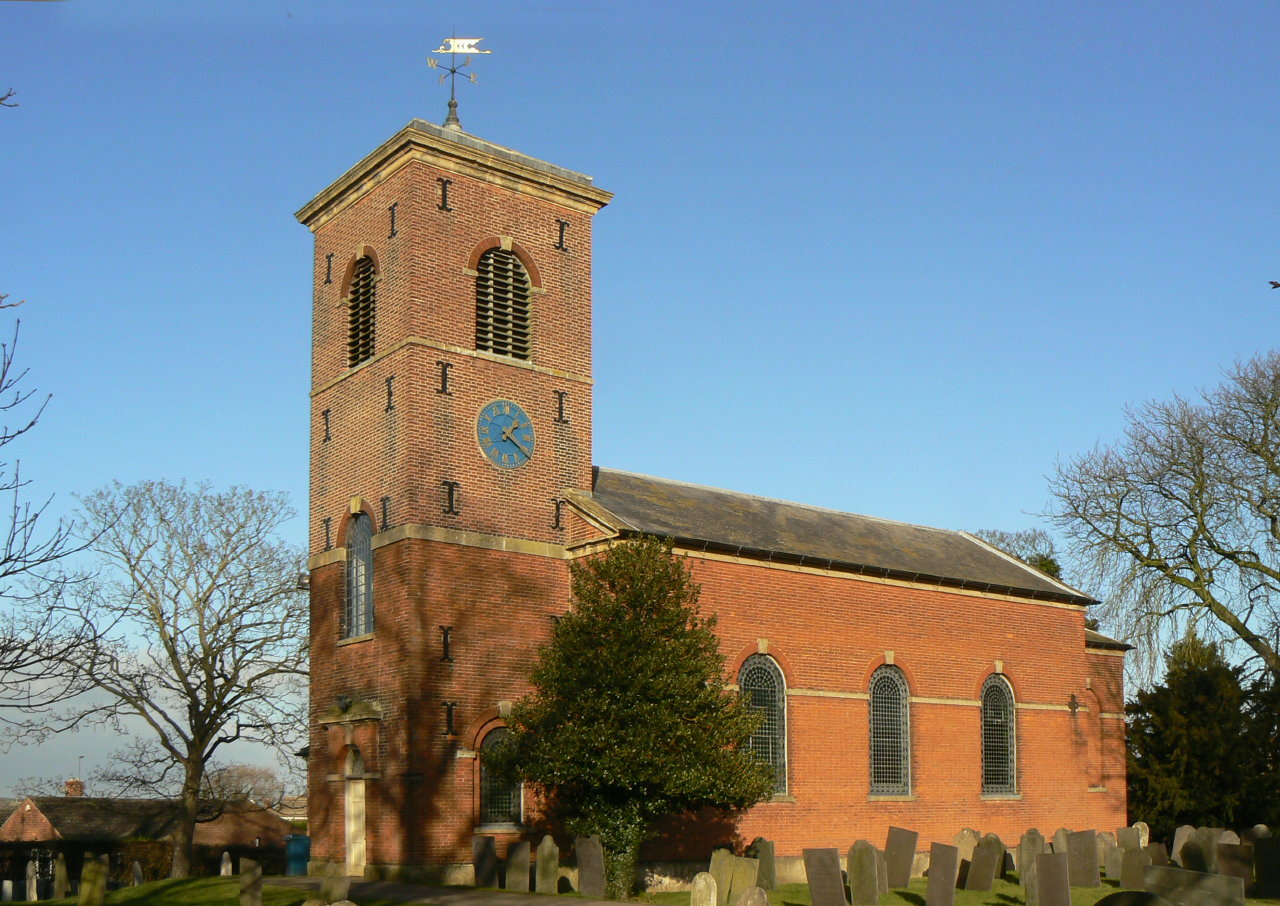
- St Luke's Church, Kinoulton

- Location within Nottinghamshire
- Interactive map of Kinoulton
- Area: 4.82 sq mi (12.5 km^{2})
- Population: 972 (2021)
  - Density: 202/sq mi (78/km^{2})
- OS grid reference: SK 682310
  - London: 100 mi (160 km) SSE
- District: Rushcliffe
- Shire county: Nottinghamshire
- Region: East Midlands
- Country: England
- Sovereign state: United Kingdom
- Post town: NOTTINGHAM
- Postcode district: NG12
- Dialling code: 01949
- Police: Nottinghamshire
- Fire: Nottinghamshire
- Ambulance: East Midlands
- UK Parliament: Rushcliffe
- Website: www.kinoulton.com

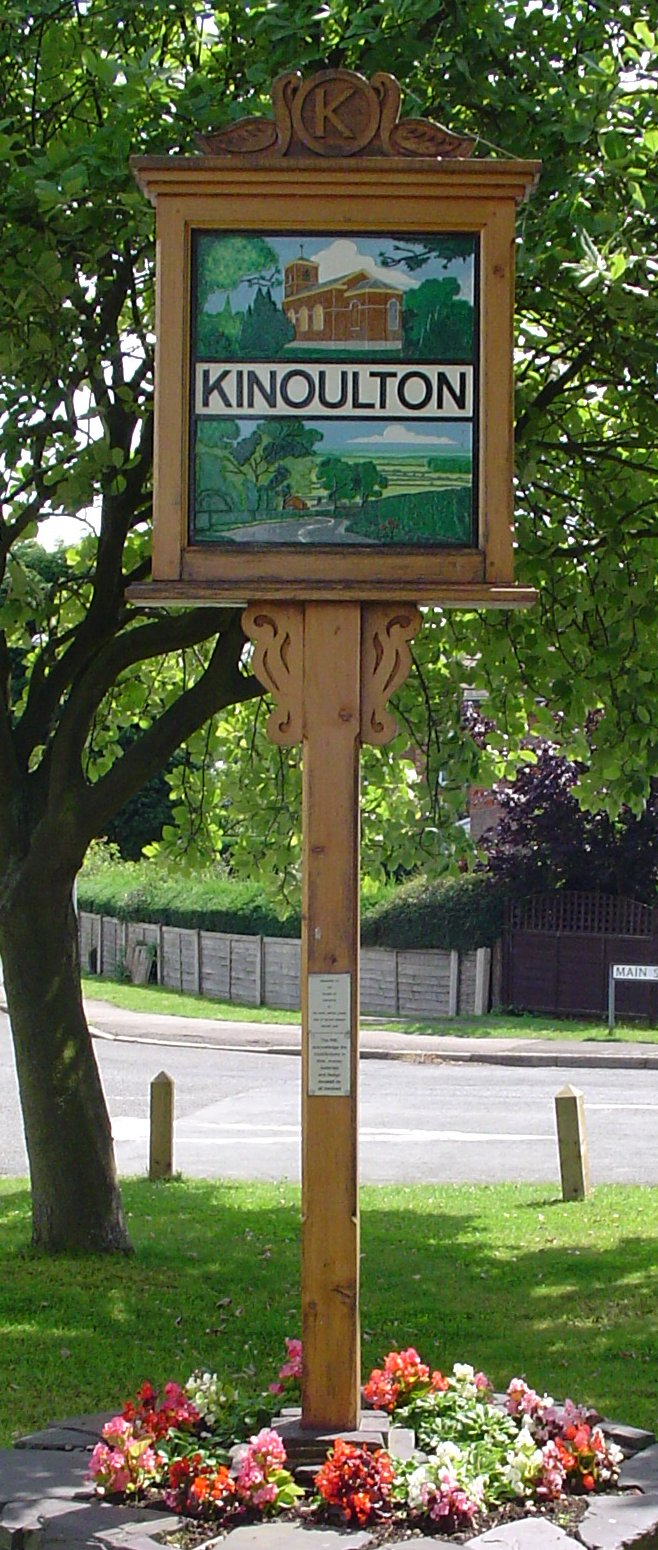
Signpost in Kinoulton

Kinoulton is a village, civil parish and ecclesiastical parish in Nottinghamshire, England, 11 miles (18 km) south east of the city of Nottingham. It is probably Saxon in origin, and once had a brick-making industry. It is close to the A46 road (Fosse Way), and has a population of about 1,000.

== Name ==
The name Kinoulton probably has Saxon origins and 'Cynhildestun (Cynhilds Farm) is a suggested starting point, the name having weathered though many variations over the years to become Kinoulton.

== History ==
The original settlement was close to the Roman Fosse Way, now the A46 trunk road, just north of its junction with the present day A606 Nottingham to Melton Mowbray road. It was close to the site of a civil war skirmish by the Lodge on the Wolds near the present day A46. Around the time when the Grantham Canal was opened in 1797, connecting the town of Grantham in Lincolnshire with the River Trent at Nottingham, the centre of the village migrated eastwards, downhill into the Vale of Belvoir. Some suggest highwaymen on the A46 as a cause for this, other suggest a movement away from the plague. A somewhat later driving factor towards pushing the centre of population down Kinoulton Hill was the canal (built 1790s) and the communication links it brought. The site of the village's pinfold, where stray animals were kept if their owners failed to properly supervise their use of common grazing land, is adjacent to the new church, now only remembered in street names.

Kinoulton was once home to a brickyard where bricks were manufactured. The site was close to what is now the 'Old School House' and situated upon the canal bank which enabled easy transportation of the bricks. The brickyard workers lived in cottages in what is now Baileys Row at the east end of the village. The remains of the wharf serving the brickyard are still evident on the canal bank in the form of stone edgings, although the remains are overgrown and difficult to see. Kinoulton brick was used to produce a number of buildings in the village including the church, Field Farm, Bishops Close (a house not a 'close' as we might know it) and many other buildings that now have a rendered exterior.

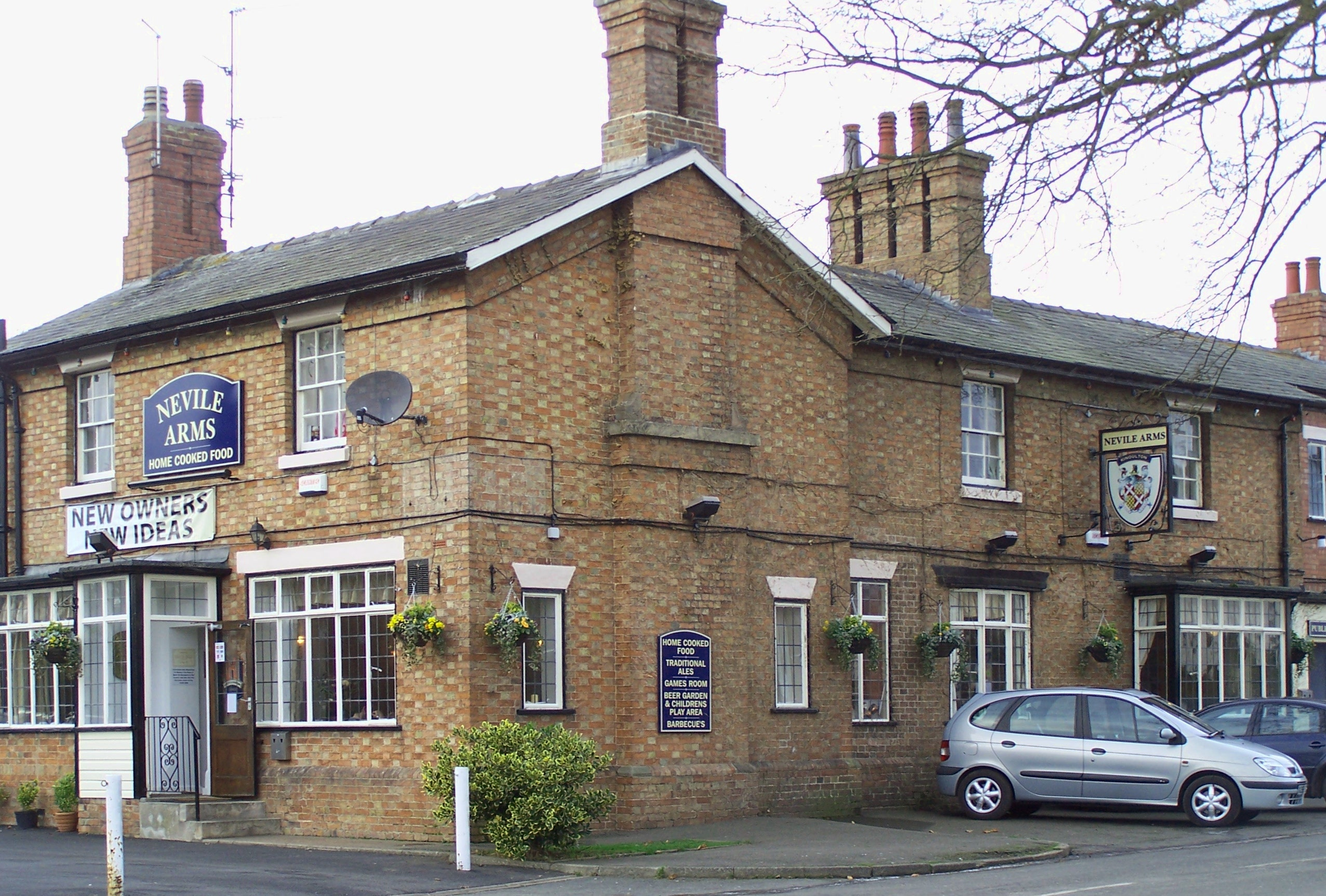
The Neville Arms, Kinoulton

Kinoulton once had permanent post office situated in Hall Lane. It closed in 2008 and became a private residence, but post office business survives in the church albeit on a part-time basis. Wednesday mornings are particularly busy in the church as there is a well frequented café running alongside the Post Office. Cake and coffee can be had for a small consideration along with vibrant conversation from the locals of all ages.

Kinoulton has one pub left, called the Nevile Arms. The pub has been closed since November 2024 and the owners are currently seeking new tennants. There has been a pub on this location since the 1860s and possibly slightly earlier. 19th century census documents show the Herrick family running the pub as well as farming during the 1800s, indicating the agricultural nature of the village during this period. The Nevile Arms had a brief spell as the Hind Arms during 1928 reflecting the local Hind family, but local dissension resulted in the Nevile name returning. Note the spelling of Nevile with a single 'l'. Previously the village had two other pubs, 'The Volunteer' and the 'Bull's Head', the former at what is now Rose Cottage and the latter by the canal at Bridge House serving ale to canal users, both now long gone.

== Religion ==
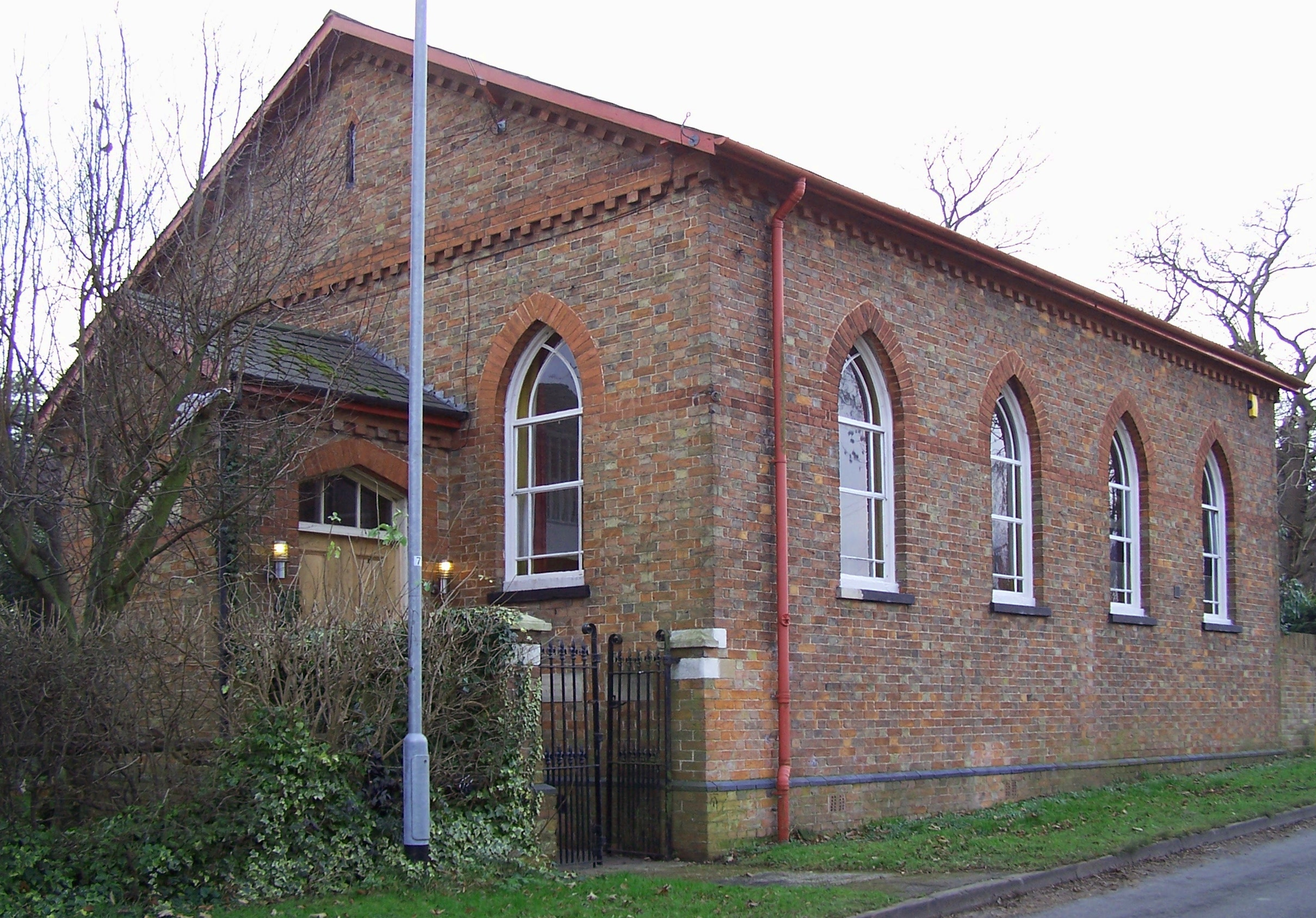
Wesleyan Chapel now a private house

A new parish church of St Luke was built for the Earl of Gainsborough in 1792–93, close to the canal, and is a relatively rare example of a village parish church from this period. It is built in red brick, consisting of a nave and chancel, with a vestry to the north-east and a three-stage tower at the western end. It has been Grade II* listed since 1965. It replaced a church dedicated to St Wilfred which was located to the north of Kinoulton Lane. Although the building was demolished, the churchyard remains and contains a group of 34 headstones dating from the 1700s.

The former Wesleyan chapel is now a private house.

== Demography ==
According to the 2001 census it had a population of 1,037. 2004 estimates indicate a population of 990. The population taken at the 2011 census was 1,050, this fell to 972 at the 2021 census.

== See also ==
- Listed buildings in Kinoulton
