= St Luke's Church, Kinoulton =

St Luke’s Church, Kinoulton
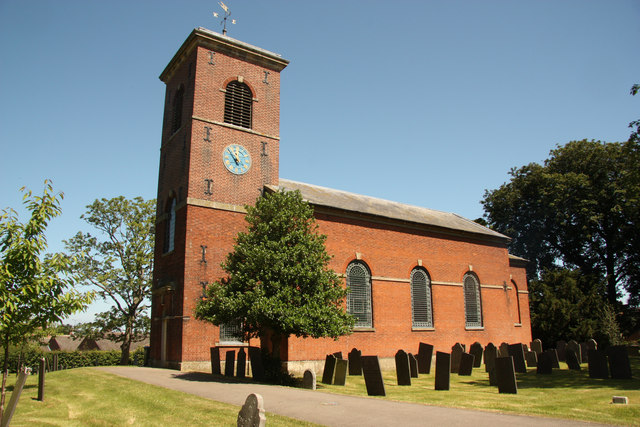
- St Luke’s Church, Kinoulton
- 52°52′11.1″N 0°59′47.2″W
- Location: Main Street, Kinoulton, Nottinghamshire NG12 3EN
- Country: England
- Denomination: Church of England

History
- Dedication: St Luke

Architecture
- Heritage designation: Grade II* listed

Administration
- Diocese: Southwell and Nottingham
- Archdeaconry: Notitngham
- Deanery: East Bingham
- Parish: Kinoulton

St Luke's Church, Kinoulton is a Grade II* listed parish church in the Church of England in Kinoulton.

== History ==
The church dates from 1793 and was built in the Classical style for Henry Noel, 6th Earl of Gainsborough.

It replaced a church dedicated to St Wilfred which was located to the north of Kinoulton Lane. Although the building was demolished, the churchyard remains and contains a group of 34 headstones dating from the 1700s.

It is in a joint parish with two other churches of the same dedication:

- St Luke's Church, Broughton Sulney
- St Luke's Church, Hickling

== Organ ==
The church has a one manual pipe organ fitted with an automatic barrel mechanism. It was installed in the church in 1947 by Cedric Arnold. A specification of the organ can be found on the National Pipe Organ Register.

== See also ==
- Grade II* listed buildings in Nottinghamshire
- Listed buildings in Kinoulton
