= Grantham Canal SSSI =

Protected area in Leicestershire, England

Coordinates: 52.895°N 0.867°W

- Site of Special Scientific Interest
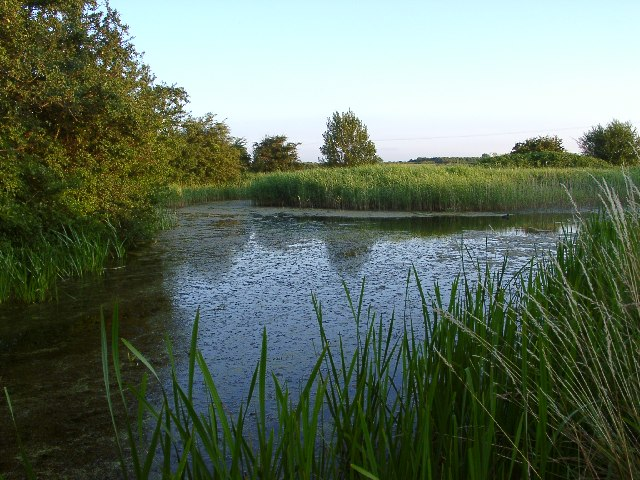
- Location of Grantham Canal SSSI.
- Area of search: Leicestershire
- Grid reference: SK 766 339
- Interest: Biological
- Area: 9.5 hectares
- Notification date: 1983
- Location map: Magic Map

Grantham Canal SSSI is a 9.5-hectare (23-acre) biological Site of Special Scientific Interest which runs along a stretch of the Grantham Canal and its banks between Redmile and Harby in Leicestershire.

This site has diverse aquatic and terrestrial habitats, which supports a varied insect community. The canal has floating plants such as fat duckweed and water fern, and there are breeding birds such as sedge warblers, moorhens and reed warblers.

There is access to the canal towpath.
