= Knipton =

Village in Leicestershire, England

Coordinates: 52.87269°N 0.77613°W

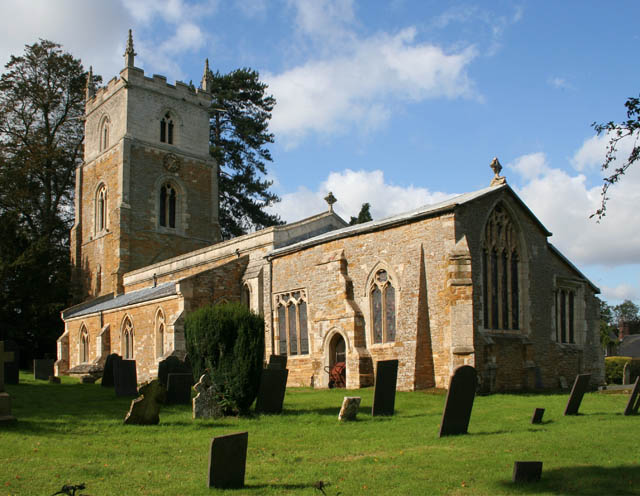
- All Saints' Church

- Location within Leicestershire
- OS grid reference: SK824312
  - London: 100 mi (160 km) SSE
- Civil parish: Belvoir
- District: Melton
- Shire county: Leicestershire
- Region: East Midlands
- Country: England
- Sovereign state: United Kingdom
- Post town: GRANTHAM
- Postcode district: NG32
- Dialling code: 01476
- Police: Leicestershire
- Fire: Leicestershire
- Ambulance: East Midlands
- UK Parliament: Melton and Syston

Knipton is a village and former civil parish, now in the parish of Belvoir, in the Melton district, in the county of Leicestershire, England. It lies about 6 miles (10 km) from the town of Grantham, just off the A607, and 10 miles (16 km) from Melton Mowbray. It borders the Duke of Rutland's estate at Belvoir Castle. Although the village is in Leicestershire, it has a Nottinghamshire postcode and a Lincolnshire (Grantham) STD code. In 1931 the parish had a population of 273. On 1 April 1936 the parish was abolished and merged with Belvoir.

== Architecture ==
The parish church of All Saints is a Grade II* listed building. It has a 13th-century tower at the west end and a chancel at the east end, separated by a 14th-century nave and a north aisle. A south aisle was added in 1869 by W. Thompson of Grantham. The churchyard includes two listed table tombs.

Knipton's village hall was built as a Church of England primary school in 1850–1854 in a Mock Tudor style, on orders from the Duke of Rutland, and extended to the rear in 1868. The slate roof carries a tall spire above a louvred bell turret. The building has been Grade II listed since 1979, but ceased to serve as a school in the late 20th century. The village has a number of houses built for the Belvoir Estate, including a couple of cottages ornés from early Victorian times and some late 19th-century houses.

Knipton Reservoir, built in the 1790s to supply water for the Grantham Canal, lies to the west of the village.

== Iron ore ==
Iron ore was quarried in two areas of Knipton. Both quarries have now been smoothed over and the fields are at a lower level than the roads.

=== Southern quarries ===
These were an extension of the quarries at Woolsthorpe and Harston. Quarrying began east of the road from Knipton to Croxton Kerrial in 1924, ceasing in 1943. A quarry on the west side of the road operated in 1941–1946. The quarries used steam and diesel quarrying machines. Ore was removed by a steam-operated narrow-gauge tramway to a tipping dock on the standard-gauge railway at Harston, where it was tipped into standard-gauge trucks for transport. In 1956 quarrying resumed where it had finished in 1946. By that time the narrow-gauge tramway had been replaced by a standard-gauge line worked by steam locomotives, which brought the trucks to the sidings at Harston from where British Railways locomotives took them away. From 1960 onwards, the ore from some of the quarries was loaded into lorries to be taken to the tramway or the sidings at Harston. The tramway was lifted in early 1964, but the lorry-worked quarries continued for a while. Production at Knipton had ceased by the end of 1964.

=== Waltham Iron Ore Company quarries ===
Quarrying began at High Leys, close to the Belvoir Road in 1949. The quarry closed in 1951, to be replaced by Granby pit, closer to the village on the east side of the road. Granby closed in 1955, when quarrying began on the opposite side of the road at Harts Pit. Quarrying ceased at Harts in 1958. These quarries were served by an extension of the Waltham Iron Ore Tramway that transported ore to a tipping stage at the terminus of British Railway's Eaton branch. Diesel quarrying machines were used. The tramway was removed in 1959, and most of the remaining rolling stock was scrapped on site in 1960. One locomotive Cambrai was preserved by the Narrow Gauge Railway Museum and is now on loan to the Irchester Narrow Gauge Railway Museum.

== The Red House Inn ==
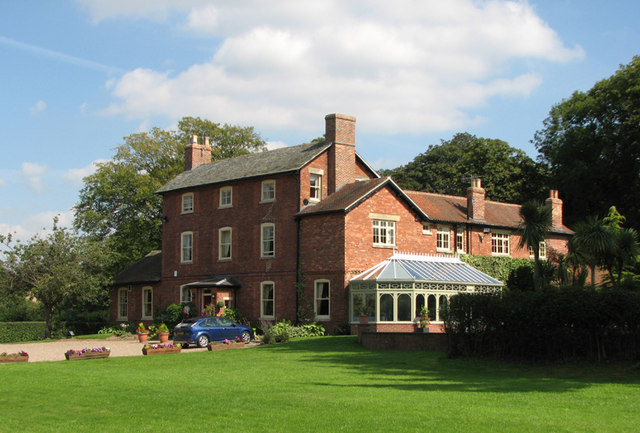
The Manners Arms

The village public house is now named the Manners Arms, after the family of the Duke of Rutland. Earlier there had been a Marquis of Granby in the village street. The Manners Arms occupies a late 18th-century brick building known as the Red House, with three bays and two-and-a-half storeys. It retains its slate roof and 19th-century plate-glass sash windows and shutters, and internally features an original closed-string staircase with a ramped handrail and turned balusters.

Originally part of one of the few freehold pieces of land dating back to Anglo-Saxon times, and so not part of the Belvoir estate, the land was used for various purposes, including a maltings and squatters' cottages. The current building was built in 1774–1790 as a private house for the Rev. Robert Jones, the 5th Duke's chaplain. On Jones's death, the house passed to his son and upon his death to the son's wife. Her son, the estates clerk, mortgaged the building in 1802 for £350. Unable to service the debt, he sold the building and mortgage to the 5th Duke for £750. The house was modified in the late 1920s as the intended dower house for Violet, the 8th Duchess, but she decided to live at Eastwell Hall. The next plan was to subdivide the house into five flats, but this failed to materialise. When converted into a public house in the late 20th century, it was called the Red House Inn, but renamed the Manners Arms in 2005 at the behest of the 11th Duke of Rutland.

== Transport ==
Knipton is served by three weekday buses a day between Melton Mowbray and Grantham. Grantham is the nearest railway station (8.6 miles, 13.8 km). The main A607 road between Melton Mowbray and Grantham runs to the south of the village.
