= Barrowby =

Village in South Kesteven district of Lincolnshire, England

Coordinates: 52.917°N 0.692°W

- Location within Lincolnshire
- OS grid reference: SK880363
  - London: 100 mi (160 km) S
- District: South Kesteven
- Shire county: Lincolnshire
- Region: East Midlands
- Country: England
- Sovereign state: United Kingdom
- Post town: GRANTHAM
- Postcode district: NG32
- Dialling code: 01476
- Police: Lincolnshire
- Fire: Lincolnshire
- Ambulance: East Midlands
- UK Parliament: Sleaford and North Hykeham

Barrowby is a village and civil parish in the South Kesteven district of Lincolnshire, England. It is 2 miles (3.2 km) west of Grantham. It overlooks the Vale of Belvoir and has a Grade I listed parish church. The hamlet of Casthorpe is part of the parish. The 2001 Census listed 795 households and a population of 1,996, which fell to 840 households with 1,952 inhabitants at the 2011 census. It was estimated at 1,986 in 2019.

== Etymology ==
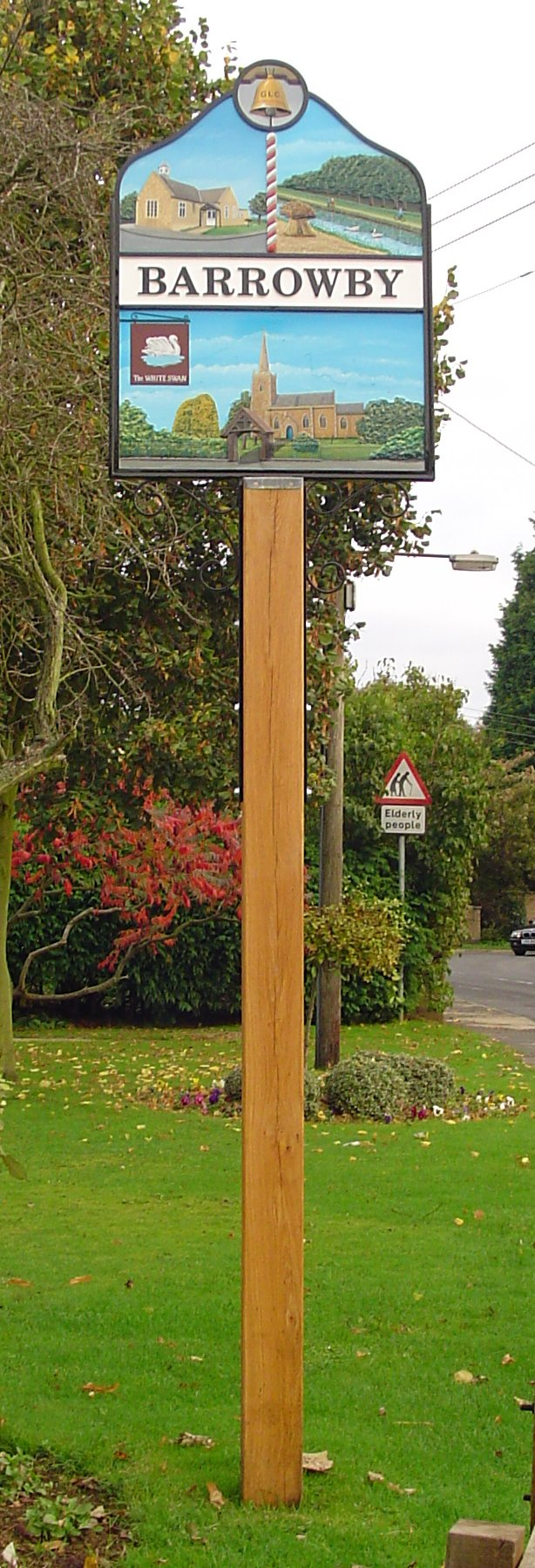
Barrowby signpost

The first written records for Barrowby appear in the Domesday Book of 1086, in which the village is referred to as "Bergebi". This is thought to derive from the Scandinavian languages' berg-by meaning village by the hill.

== History ==
The Domesday Book record shows there was a church with a priest and 60 acres (0.24 km^{2}) of meadow. The village belonged until the 19th century to the historical wapentake of Winnibriggs and Threo.

The Domesday village of Casthorpe is 1.5 miles (2.4 km) west from Barrowby. By the 14th century it was referred to in records as two holdings, East and West Casthorpe. It is now little more than a cluster of farm buildings. A further deserted medieval village is Newbo, 1.5 miles (2.4 km) to the north-west, site of Newbo Abbey. The village was located by archaeologists in 1970.

=== 1941 mid-air collision ===
On 11 October 1941, at 9.20pm, a Junkers Ju 88 'R4+NL', of Nachtjagdgeschwader 2, had a mid-air collision with a RAF Airspeed Ltd. aircraft; the British aircraft AB767 crashed at 87 Dysart Road. Three German aircrew were killed, after the Junkers aircraft crashed at Westry Corner.

- Leutnant Hans Hahn (21 February 1919- 1941, a Ritterkreuzträger, awarded on 9 July 1941)
- Unteroffizier Ernst-Wilhelm Meissler
- Unteroffizier Helmuth Scheidt

On Monday 21 April 1941 2.35am, over nearby Stroxton, Hans Hahn had shot down Fairey Battle 'P6674'.

== Geography ==
Barrowby stands where the A52 road crosses the A1 road, which separates the village from the western edge of Grantham. The village is close to the Lincolnshire border with Leicestershire and Nottinghamshire.

It is 300 feet (91 m) above sea level and adjacent to the Vale of Belvoir. From the village it is possible to see Belvoir Castle, Lincoln Cathedral, and multiple power stations in the Trent valley, including West Burton and Cottam, near Gainsborough over 40 miles (60 km) away.

Adjoining villages include Sedgebrook, Harlaxton, Denton and the hamlets of Casthorpe and Stenwith.

== Culture and community ==
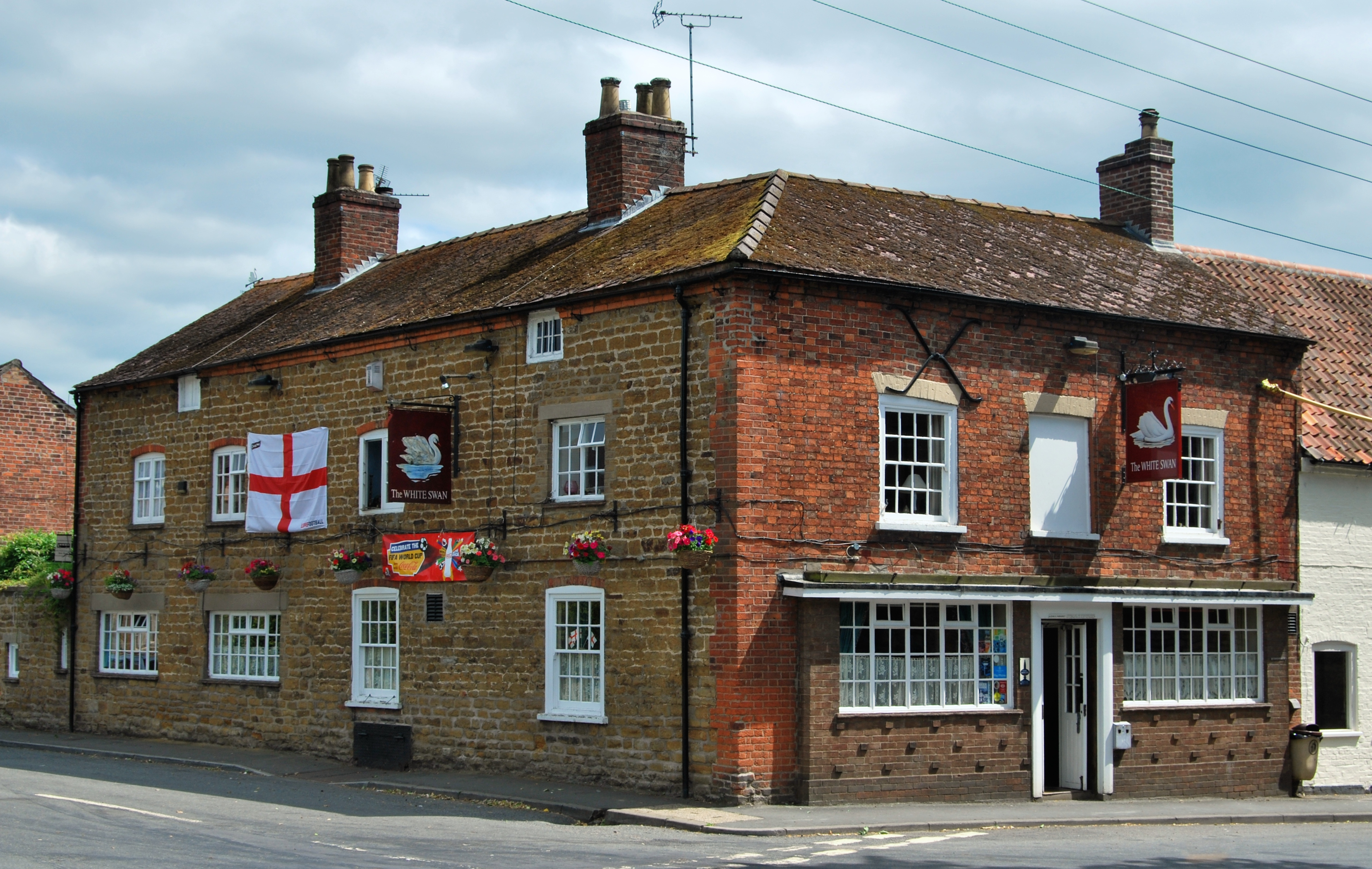
The White Swan, Barrowby

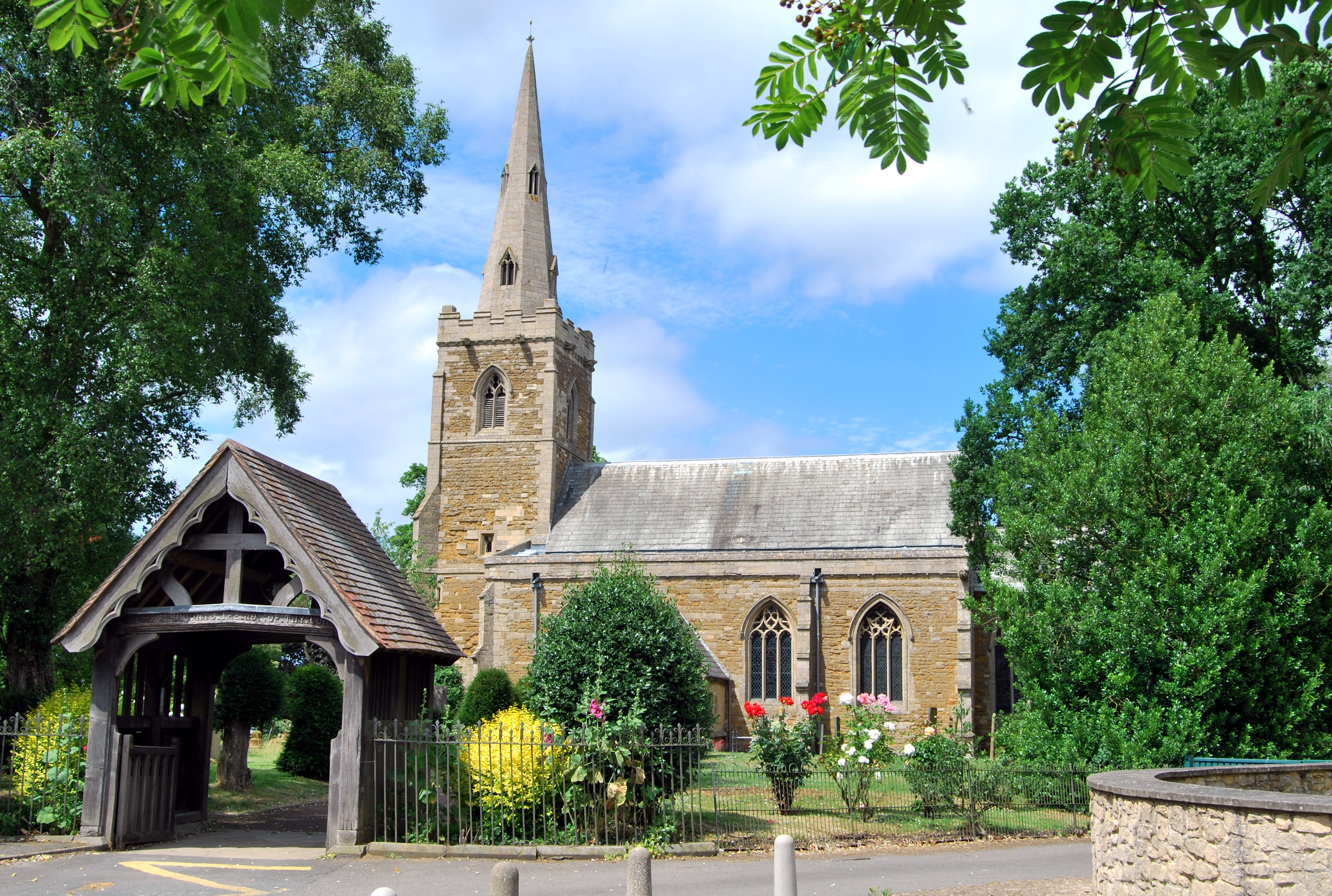
All Saints Church, Barrowby

There has been a Barrowby fête or gala in various forms since the 1950s. From 2004 until recently, an annual Barrowby Gala and Beer Festival was held on the village green. The event, with stalls, games, fairground rides, and tug of war, was organised by a committee of village residents.

Barrowby combines old buildings, cottages and manor houses, with newer buildings in a housing estate built within the last few decades. Linking the new housing estate and the original Barrowby centre are two main roads, High Road and Low Road. Some surrounding road names reflect the names of patrons and residents who established and shaped the village.

Barrowby contains a cafe and a Co-op. It had a post office till 2023 when the post mistress left and a butcher's that closed in 2023. The village public house is The White Swan. Until 1959 there was a second public house, The Marquis of Granby Inn, on the corner of Welby Court and Main Street. It is pictured in a 1910 postcard of the village.

The Anglican Grade I listed parish church, dedicated to All Saints, was built in the 13th and 14th centuries from ironstone and limestone, in the Early English and Perpendicular Gothic styles. The church was extensively restored in 1852 and 1870. It includes a medieval door on the south side of the chancel, a humorous corbel at the foot of a south window, depicting a head that seems to have been pinched out of place by the adjacent buttress, and a blocked north door. Significant internal features include stained glass windows.

The ecclesiastical parish belongs to the Barrowby and Great Gonerby group in the Deanery of Grantham, Diocese of Lincoln. The incumbent was Rev. Peter Hopkins until his retirement in 2019. Services are held in Gonerby and at All Saints.

There was a Methodist chapel in Chapel Lane, next to where the post office now stands.

== Education ==
Barrowby parish school was built in 1852 adjacent to the church. Part of the original school hall and bell tower remain. It has since been modernised with additional buildings. It has a school roll of about 240 pupils aged 4–11 and has received Basic Skills Mark, Healthy Schools, and Eco-Schools Silver Status awards.

== Notable people ==
- Dr Thomas Hurst was born in the village in 1598 and became rector of Barrowby in 1629. He became chaplain to King Charles I.
- Henry Savile, diplomat, MP for Newark and libertine (c1642-1687), was born at Rufford and was a great friend of the notorious Earl of Rochester.
- Sir John Thorold, 4th Baronet was a landowner who owned about a quarter of the parish, the other parts being split between the Duke of Devonshire and the Welby family. The Thorold family also owned land in the nearby villages of Casthorpe and Sedgebrook. Thorold Road is named after Sir John.
- Frank Jenkinson, OBE (1882–1965) was born Barrowby Vale, Jenkinson was a farmer, magistrate, and influential local politician. He served as Chairman of Kesteven County Council and was recognized for his contributions to agriculture and public service.
