= Grantham Canal =

Canal once running between Grantham and Nottingham

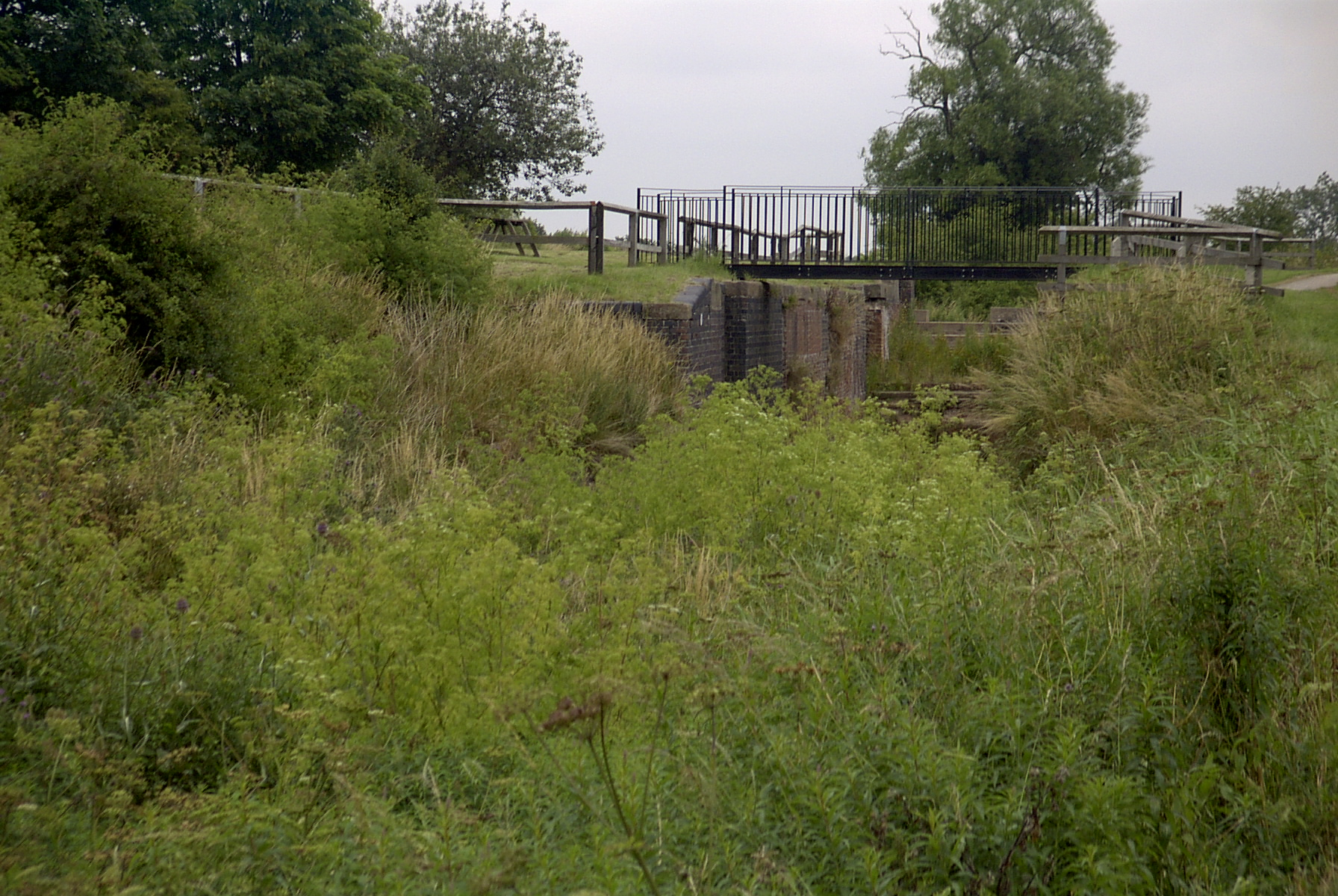
- A dry lock on the canal near Cropwell Bishop
- Interactive map of Grantham Canal

Specifications
- Maximum boat length: 75 ft 0 in (22.86 m)
- Maximum boat beam: 14 ft 0 in (4.27 m)
- Locks: 18
- Status: Parts restored
- Navigation authority: Canal and River Trust

History
- Original owner: Grantham Canal Co
- Principal engineer: William Jessop
- Other engineers: James Green, William King
- Date of act: 1793
- Date completed: 1797
- Date closed: 1936

Geography
- Start point: Grantham
- End point: West Bridgford
- Connects to: River Trent

The Grantham Canal ran 33 miles (53 km) from Grantham through 18 locks to West Bridgford, where it joined the River Trent. It was built primarily for the transportation of coal to Grantham. It opened in 1797 and its profitability steadily increased until 1841. It was then sold to a railway company, declined, and was finally closed in 1936. It was used as a water supply for agriculture, and so most of it remained in water after closure, although bridges were lowered. Since the 1970s, the Grantham Canal Society have been working to restore parts of it. Two stretches are now navigable to small vessels. A new route will be required where the canal joins the Trent, as road building has severed the original one.

== History ==
Grantham Canal Act 1793
- Act of Parliament
- Parliament of Great Britain
- Long title: An Act for making and maintaining a Navigable Canal from or nearly from the Town of Grantham, in the County of Lincoln, to the River Trent, near Nottingham Trent Bridge, and also a Collateral Cut from the said intended Canal, at or near Cropwell Butler, to the Town of Bingham, both in the County of Nottingham.
- Citation: 33 Geo. 3. c. 94
- Territorial extent: Great Britain

Dates
- Royal assent: 30 April 1793
- Commencement: 30 April 1793 (Note: The Acts of Parliament (Commencement) Act 1793.)
Other legislation
| Amended by | Grantham Canal Act 1797 |

Status: Amended

Text of statute as originally enacted

The concept of a canal from the River Trent to Grantham was first raised on 27 August 1791, as a way of supplying the district with cheaper coal. The intent was for the navigation to join the Trent below Nottingham at Radcliffe-on-Trent. As William Jessop was surveying the Nottingham Canal at the time, he was asked to survey the Grantham route as well, and a bill was put before Parliament in 1792. It was defeated, as there was opposition from coal suppliers, who delivered coal by road to Grantham, and from those who thought that the River Witham would be damaged by the project. A revised route was developed, with the junction now at West Bridgford, and an additional 3.6-mile (5.8 km) branch to Bingham. A second bill was put forward and the act of Parliament, the Grantham Canal Act 1793 (33 Geo. 3. c. 94), received royal assent on 30 April 1793. Building work on the canal started in 1793, with Jessop in overall charge, but with James Green and William King as resident engineers: Green, who was from Wollaton, was appointed engineer for the section of canal from the Trent to the Leicestershire border, while King, who was the agent for the Duke of Rutland, was responsible for the rest of the canal, including two reservoirs, one at Denton and the other at Knipton on the River Devon.

Grantham Canal Act 1797
- Act of Parliament
- Parliament of Great Britain
- Long title: An Act for enabling the Company of Proprietors of the Grantham Canal Navigation, to finish and complete the same, and the Collateral Cut to communicate therewith; and for amending the Act of Parliament passed in the Thirty-third Year of the Reign of His present Majesty, for making and maintaining the said Canal and Collateral Cut.
- Citation: 37 Geo. 3. c. 30
- Territorial extent: Great Britain

Dates
- Royal assent: 3 March 1797
- Commencement: 3 March 1797
Other legislation
| Amends | Grantham Canal Act 1793 |

Status: Current legislation

Text of statute as originally enacted

The act authorised an initial £75,000 to be raised to pay for construction, together with an option to raise a further £30,000, of which £20,000 should be raised by shares of £100 each among the initial subscribers, and £10,000 by mortgaging the future income of the canal. However, this amount proved insufficient, and there was also disagreement between the shareholders as to their liability to raise the additional £20,000. As a result, a second act of Parliament was sought. This received royal assent as the Grantham Canal Act 1797 (37 Geo. 3. c. 30) on 3 March 1797, and made clear the obligations of existing shareholders to pay the extra subscription, and also authorised an additional £24,000 to be raised. The second act also removed restrictions in the first act, and allowed the company to set whatever rates it chose for using the canal.

The eastern section from the Leicestershire border was opened on 1 February 1797, with the rest of the canal later that year. The canal was built with locks 75 by 14 feet (22.9 by 4.3 m), the same size as those on the Nottingham Canal to allow boats to use both. The branch to Bingham authorised by the first act of Parliament was not built. The 18 locks raised the level of the canal by 140 feet (43 m) from the Trent to Grantham. Eleven of them were in the first 4 miles (6.4 km) above the Trent, after which there was a level pound of around 20 miles (32 km) before a flight of seven locks at Woolsthorpe, and a much shorter upper pound to Grantham. At Harlaxton, the canal passed through a deep cutting (effectively crossing the watershed between the River Witham and the River Trent), which was only wide enough for a single boat, but this situation was partially rectified in 1801 when the cutting was widened in two places to allow boats travelling on opposite directions to cross. At Cropwell Bishop and Cropwell Butler, the route passed through gypsum beds, which resulted in problems with leakage.

=== Operation ===
The canal made sufficient money to repay substantial debts in 1804 and 1805, after which dividends were paid to the shareholders, beginning at 2 per cent in 1806, rising to 5 per cent in 1815, and reaching their highest level of 8.6 per cent in 1839. The tolls brought in an income which remained below £9,000 until 1823, but then rose steadily to reach £13,079 in 1841. Traffic towards Grantham included coal and coke, lime, groceries and building materials. Some of it supplied villages along the line of the canal, and some of that which travelled the full distance was distributed by land to villages beyond Grantham. Downward traffic was largely agricultural produce, including corn, beans, malt and wool. Such produce was normally loaded at Grantham or Harby.

Initially, some of the coal carried on the canal had been transported in boats owned by the canal company, but they had given up this practice in 1812. They resumed carrying coal in 1827, because they felt that coal stocks at Grantham were not adequate, but were accused of price-fixing. Although the penalty imposed by Lincoln Assizes was small, they ceased this trade, and the coal merchants agreed to maintain stocks of 2,660 tons at Grantham. In 1833, J. Rofe and his son made a proposal for a canal to connect Grantham and Sleaford, but this was not pursued.

=== Decline ===
In common with most canals, competition from railways posed a major threat, and in 1845 the canal owners agreed to sell it to the Ambergate, Nottingham, Boston and Eastern Junction Railway when their line from Ambergate to Grantham was opened. Although the railway was completed in 1850, the railway company did not honour the agreement. The canal company brought a large number of cases against the railway company, and successfully opposed several bills which the railway were trying to get passed in Parliament. Eventually the railway company agreed to pay, and shareholders received £45 per share in cash, with the balance being in railway mortgages. The agreement was reached on 1 June 1854, and the transfer of ownership took place on 20 December. Railway mergers meant that the canal came under the control of the Great Northern Railway in 1861, and later the London and North Eastern Railway.

Traffic declined as the railway companies neglected the canal, and were down to 18,802 tons in 1905, on which the tolls amounted to £242 and the London and North Eastern Railway (General Powers) Act 1936 (26 Geo. 5 & 1 Edw. 8. c. cxxvii) formally closed the canal, though there had been no boat traffic since 1929. The closure act stipulated that water levels should be maintained at 2 feet (60 cm) to support agricultural needs. This effectively guaranteed the continued existence of the canal channel, but structures such as locks and bridges deteriorated, and in the 1950s 46 of the 69 bridges over the canal were lowered as part of road improvement schemes. Although the low bridges act as barriers to navigation, large parts of the canal are still in water.

In 1948 Britain's railways, and hence the canal, were nationalised, and became the responsibility of the British Transport Commission. In 1963 control of the canal passed to British Waterways. Under the terms of the Transport Act 1968, all waterways within the jurisdiction of British Waterways were classified as commercial, cruising or remainder waterways. Remainder waterways were those that were deemed to have no economic future, and maintenance would only be carried out where failure to do so would create health or safety issues. The Grantham Canal was listed in this latter category.

== Restoration ==
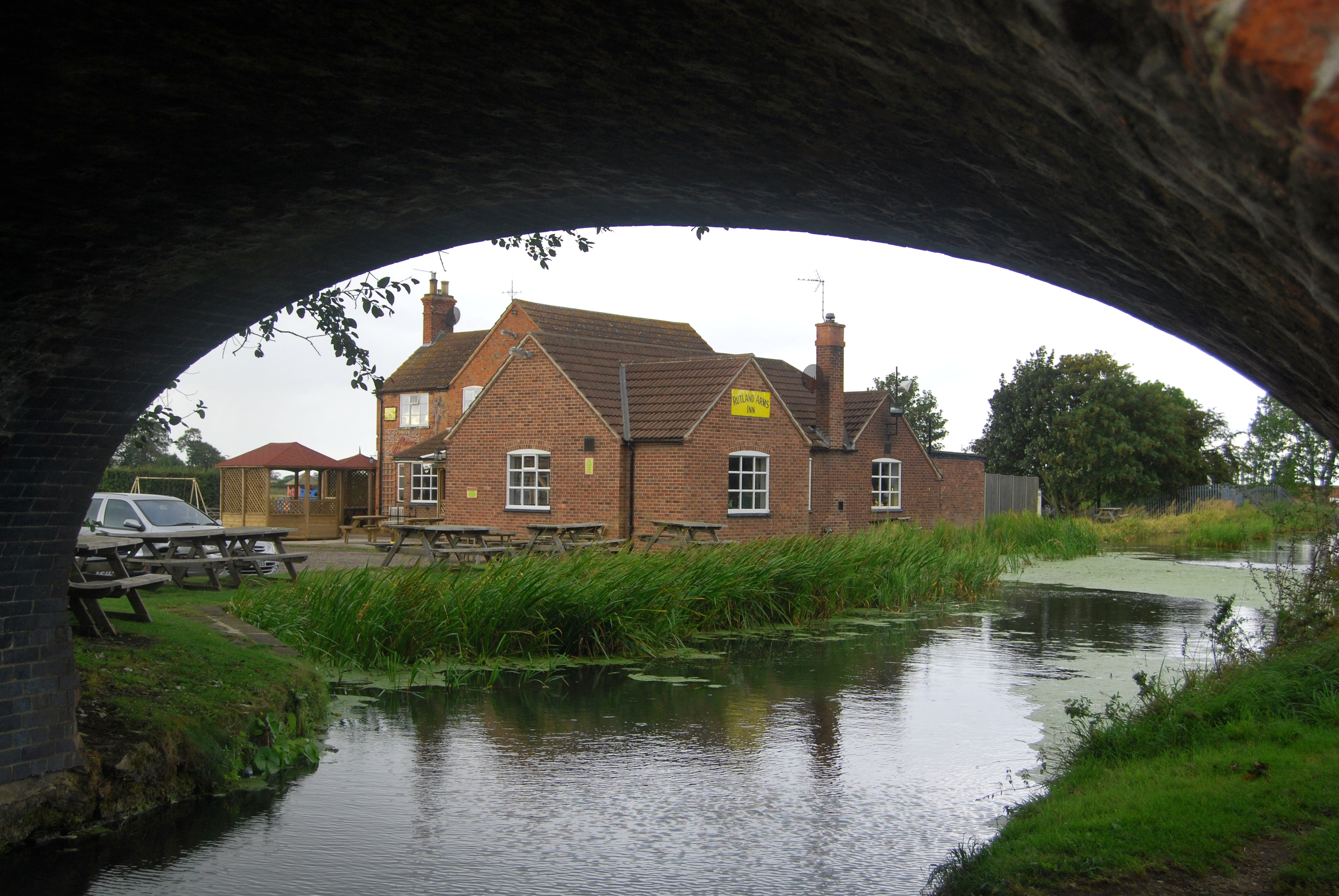
The "Dirty Duck" at Woolsthorpe viewed through bridge 61

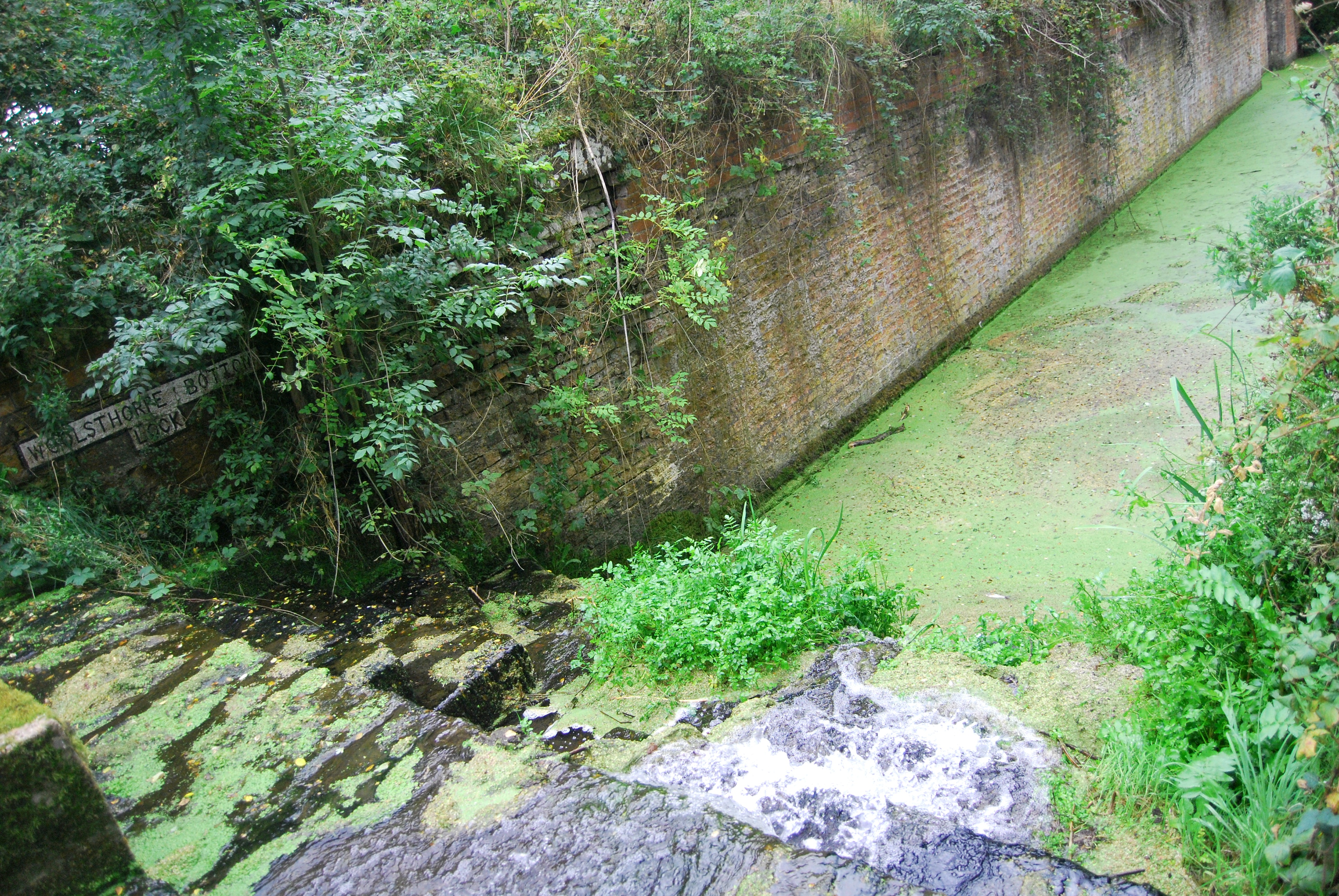
Woolsthorpe Bottom Lock

A plan to fill in a section of the canal in Nottingham resulted in a number of letters appearing in the local press in 1963, and a student at Kesteven College produced a report on the state of the canal, which was presented to the Grantham Civic Society. In 1970, the British Waterways Board attempted to obtain an act of Parliament which would have allowed them to cease maintaining the water levels of the canal. The Inland Waterways Association campaigned against the bill, and the clause was amended. The Grantham Canal Society was formed soon afterwards, to promote restoration of the waterway. In 1974, a National Boat Rally was held at Nottingham, to gain support for the restoration scheme, and to promote the idea of a new link to the Trent, which would pass through old gravel workings.

Together with British Waterways, the Inland Waterways Association and the Waterway Recovery Group, the society began the work of restoration of the canal to navigation, a process which is still ongoing. A major development was the granting of permission in 1992 to remove an old railway embankment, which blocked the route near the top of the Woolsthorpe flight of locks. The task was completed by a number of Waterway Recovery Group workcamps. New gates were fitted to the top three locks, and rebuilding of Casthorpe bridge was funded by Lincolnshire County Council, opening up 4.4 miles (7.1 km) of the canal for navigation. Further down the canal, restoration of a 2.3-mile (3.7 km) section between Hickling Basin and Hose was funded by a derelict land grant of £400,000, received in 1993. The Grantham Canal Partnership was formed in 1997, as a way to take the project forwards. It consisted of representatives from each of the six local authorities through which the route passes, British Waterways, the Inland Waterways Association, the Grantham Canal Restoration Society and the Grantham Navigation Association, a group which had split off from the Canal Society in 1992. As a result of the co-operation, British Waterways formulated a draft business plan for the canal.

Following the restoration of the top three locks at Woolsthorpe in the 1990s, a 10-mile (16-km) section from the A1 to Redmile will be completed once the bottom four locks of the flight are restored. The rebuilding of locks 6 and 7, completed in 2000, brought the number of locks restored to five, and approximately one quarter of the canal has been restored to navigable standard. Much improvement of the towpath has also taken place, and access to it is possible at most of the bridges.

A major setback occurred in 2007, when one of the walls of Woolsthorpe Top Lock had to be propped to prevent it collapsing, and British Waterways took the decision to fill it in, as funding was not available to rebuild it. The Inland Waterways Association received a legacy of £100,000 from the estate of Fredrick Woodman, designated for the Grantham Canal, but British Waterways ruled that no work could start until the whole cost of £175,000 had been found. The balance was made up by grants of £40,000 from Lincolnshire County Council and £35,000 from the East Midlands Development Agency. The wall was demolished and rebuilt in three sections, utilising 290 cubic yards (220 m^{3}) of concrete and 7,500 new bricks.

The Canal and River Trust applied for a Heritage Lottery Fund (HLF) grant to cover the costs of rebuilding locks 12 to 15 of the Woolsthorpe flight using volunteers. A visit by the Heritage Lottery Fund in November 2014 resulted in a grant of £830,000, to cover reconstruction of locks 14 and 15, which was match funded by money from the Canal and River Trust and from Grantham Canal Society. Work began in August 2015, and was completed by July 2018, with an official opening taking place on 13 September 2019. The Society were assisted by the Waterway Recovery Group, and because of the HLF funding, the project included training of their own volunteers in the skills needed to build locks. This enabled them to begin restoring lock 13 in 2024, the next in the flight, without the need to involve outside labour. The restoration is expected to take about two years and cost around £250,000.

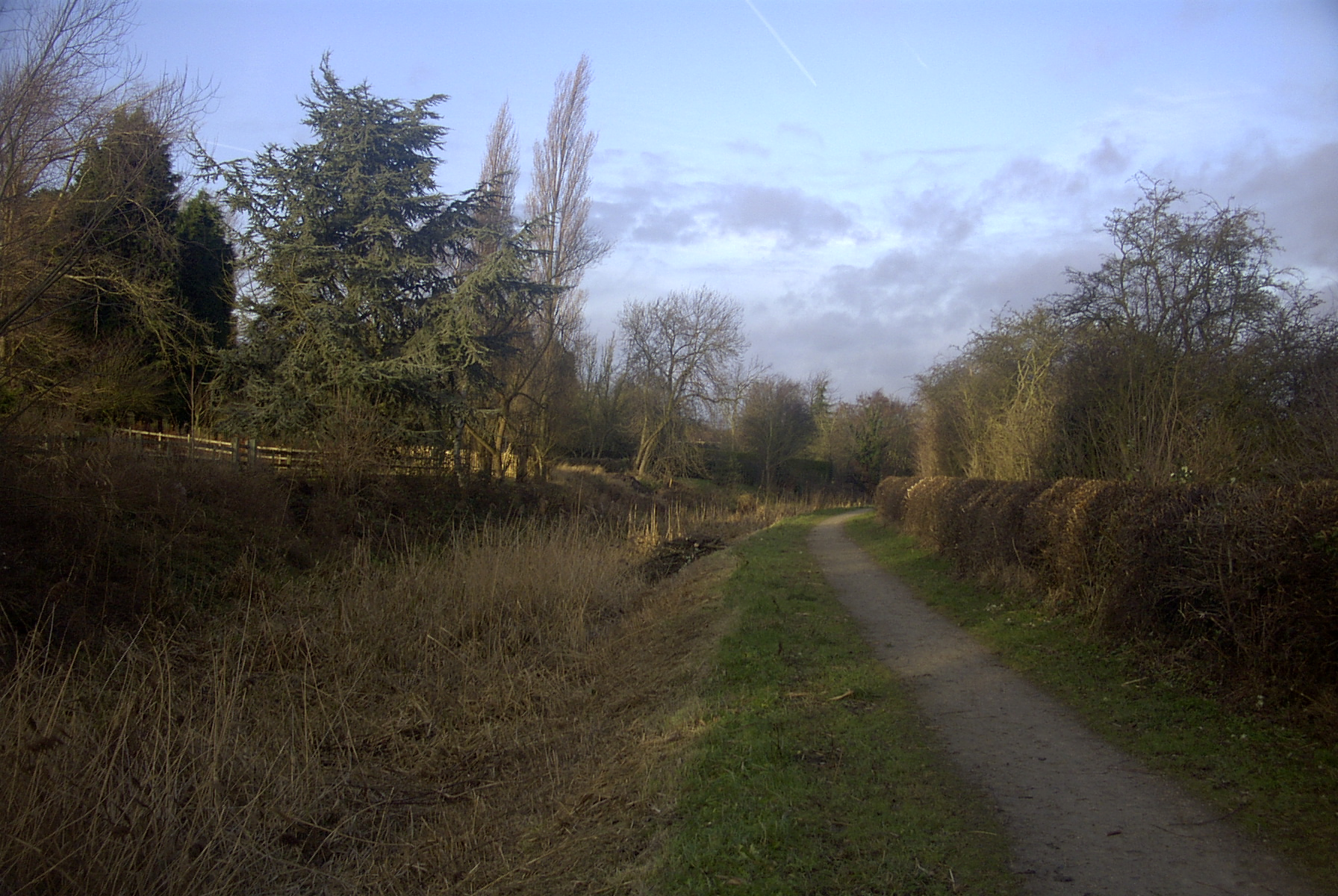
A dry section of the canal near Cropwell Bishop

Restoration of most of the canal does not present major problems, but challenges are presented by the final sections at both ends. The original route to join the Trent has been severed by the building of the A52 road. A route was identified which followed the course of the Polser Brook, which passes under the A52 to the north of the canal, but by 2009, three possible solutions were under consideration. These pose additional problems in finding funding, since they do not count as restoration, and many of the traditional funding sources are not then available. At Grantham, an embankment carrying the A1 road blocks the line of the canal, and the terminal basin has been filled in. There are plans for a tunnel under the A1 as part of a cycle route to improve access to Grantham, and the basin could be redeveloped in due course.

There is also a 5-mile (8 km) dry section between Cotgrave and Kinoulton, which has presented problems since construction in the 18th century: gypsum in the soil reacted with the waterproof clay leading to leaking.

In early 2005, the Grantham Canal Partnership appointed a full-time Grantham Canal restoration manager, Kevin Mann, for an initial 18-month trial period. He would be responsible for planning and managing funding schemes for the restoration, identifying development opportunities and the promotion and interpretation of the canal. The trial proved to be successful, as he was still doing the job in 2009.

The canal and its banks between Redmile and Harby is designated a biological Site of Special Scientific Interest as Grantham Canal SSSI.

== Points of interest ==
| Point | Coordinates (Links to map resources) | OS Grid Ref | Notes |
|---|---|---|---|
| Original terminus | 52.9086°N 0.6512°W | SK908354 | now a scrapyard |
| A1 embankment | 52.8985°N 0.6661°W | SK898342 | |
| Denton Reservoir | 52.8955°N 0.7069°W | SK870339 | |
| Woolsthorpe top lock | 52.9060°N 0.7454°W | SK844350 | |
| Woolsthorpe bottom lock | 52.9220°N 0.7612°W | SK833367 | |
| Bottesford wharf | 52.9277°N 0.8040°W | SK804373 | |
| Spencers Bridge | 52.8889°N 0.9886°W | SK681328 | Start of dry section |
| Stathern bridge | 52.8837°N 0.8786°W | SK755323 | |
| Long Clawson bridge | 52.8613°N 0.9313°W | SK720298 | |
| Bridge Farm Hickling | 52.8584°N 0.9756°W | SK690294 | |
| A46 Foss Bridge | 52.9248°N 1.0023°W | SK671368 | End of dry section |
| A46 New Foss Bridge | 52.924758°N 1.002944°W | SK67123683 | Construction 2011 |
| Mann's Bridge | 52.919142°N 1.012238°W | SK66513620 | Controversial Bridge non-reinstatement in 2009 |
| Hollygate bridge | 52.9160°N 1.0297°W | SK653358 | |
| A52 embankment | 52.9244°N 1.0985°W | SK607367 | |
| A6011 bridge | 52.9311°N 1.1109°W | SK598374 | |
| Junction with River Trent | 52.9416°N 1.1323°W | SK584385 | |

== Belvoir tramway ==
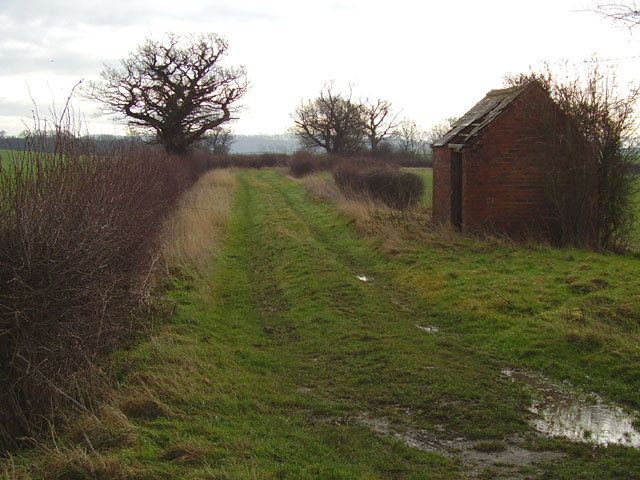
The line of the Belvoir tramway

The Duke of Rutland also constructed a private wagonway or tramway between the wharf at Muston Gorse and Belvoir Castle. It was constructed in 1814–15, and remained operational for 100 years. It was constructed with fish-belly rail set into stone chairs, some of which, and some wagons, still exist in the castle cellars. The gauge was 4 ft 4 1/2 in (1,333 mm), and the rails were supplied by The Butterley Company. Some are in the collection of the science museum, and the National Railway Museum where there is the chassis of one of the wagons.

== See also ==
- Canals of the United Kingdom
- History of the British canal system

== Bibliography ==
- Cumberlidge, Jane (1998). Inland Waterways of Great Britain (7th ed.). Imray Laurie Norie and Wilson. ISBN 978-0-85288-355-6.
- Cumberlidge, Jane (2009). Inland Waterways of Great Britain (8th ed.). Imray Laurie Norie and Wilson. ISBN 978-1-84623-010-3.
- De Salis, H.R. (1904). Bradshaw's Canals and Navigable Rivers. David and Charles Reprints.
- Hadfield, Charles (1970). The Canals of the East Midlands. David and Charles. ISBN 978-0-7153-4871-0.
- Potter, Hugh (July 2006). Restoring the Grantham Canal. Waterways World. ISSN 0309-1422.
- Priestley, Joseph (1831). "Historical Account of the Navigable Rivers, Canals, and Railways of Great Britain". Archived from the original on 4 March 2016.
- Shill, Ray (2011). Silent Highways – The forgotten heritage of the Midlands Canals. The History Press. ISBN 978-0-7524-5842-7.
- Squires, Roger (2008). Britain's Restored Canals. Landmark Publishing. ISBN 978-1-84306-331-5.
