= Redmile (disambiguation) =

Redmile is a village in Leicestershire, England.

Redmile may also refer to:

- Redmile railway station, station serving the village
- Matt Redmile (born 1976), British football central defender
