= Jack Crossland =

English cricketer (1852–1903)

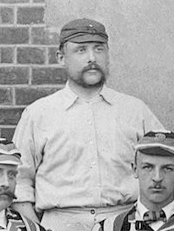

Personal information
- Full name: John Crossland
- Born: 2 April 1852; Sutton-in-Ashfield, Nottinghamshire, England
- Died: 26 September 1903 (aged 51); Blackburn, Lancashire, England
- Batting: Right-handed
- Bowling: Right-arm fast

Domestic team information
- Years: Team
- 1878–1885: Lancashire
- First-class debut: 8 August 1878 Lancashire v Yorkshire
- Last First-class: 12 May 1887 CI Thornton's XI v Cambridge University

Career statistics
Competition	First-class
Matches	84
Runs scored	1,172
Batting average	10.95
100s/50s	0/1
Top score	51
Balls bowled	10,250
Wickets	322
Bowling average	12.48
5 wickets in innings	25
10 wickets in match	6
Best bowling	8/57
Catches/stumpings	32/–
- Source: ESPNcricinfo, 1 January 2013

John Crossland (2 April 1852 – 26 September 1903) was an English professional cricketer who played first-class cricket between 1878 and 1887. Crossland was recognised as one of the fastest bowlers in county cricket, but critics generally believed that he threw, rather than bowled the ball, a practice illegal in cricket. Contemporaries suggest that, but for the suspicions over his bowling action, Crossland would have played Test cricket for England.

Crossland was born in Nottinghamshire, but qualified to play for Lancashire County Cricket Club through his residency there. He made his first-class debut for his adopted county in 1878 and reached his peak as a bowler between 1881 and 1884. His most effective year was 1882, when he headed the national bowling averages, claiming 112 wickets at an average of just over ten runs per wicket. (Note: Bowling average is calculated by dividing the number of runs a bowler has conceded by the number of wickets they have taken.) The presence of Crossland and other bowlers with suspect actions in the Lancashire team caused some counties to refuse fixtures against them during the mid-1880s. In 1885, a ruling from the Marylebone Cricket Club (MCC) barred Crossland from playing for Lancashire as his qualification for the county had technically lapsed when he lived in Nottinghamshire outside of the cricket season. The ruling forced his retirement from county cricket, although he sporadically played other first-class matches for a few years.

As a right-arm fast bowler, Crossland claimed 322 wickets in all first-class cricket at an average of 12.48. He claimed ten or more wickets in a match on six occasions. Primarily a tail-end batsman, he scored 1,172 runs with a top score of 51.

== Early career ==
Crossland was born in Sutton-in-Ashfield in Nottinghamshire on 2 April 1852. Employed as a coal miner, he was one of a number of Nottinghamshire-born cricketers who sought professional contracts in Lancashire. The Lancashire cricket leagues began paying the best players to appear for them, creating an exodus of cricketing talent to the county. Crossland first gained employment as a professional cricketer in 1876, with Enfield Cricket Club. In a single innings match against Burnley that season, he took eight wickets and conceded 88 runs (abbreviated as "eight for 88"). The following season he once again took eight wickets against the same opposition, finishing with figures of eight for 50. Towards the end of 1877, he was chosen to play for a "Gentlemen and Players XI" against Burnley in a benefit match for Burnley's professional John Melling. He took five for 10 in the match from his five overs to help his side win on first innings. In early 1878, Crossland improved upon his previous efforts, taking eight for 28 against Burnley.

== Lancashire professional ==
Crossland's performances for Enfield drew the attention of Lancashire County Cricket Club, for whom he was qualified on the basis of residency. He made his debut against Yorkshire in August 1878. He was not required to bowl in the first innings, and after scoring one run, bowled eight overs without a wicket in the second innings. He took his maiden wicket in first-class cricket in his second match, against Kent. In another benefit match played for Melling, Crossland took eight for 60 for "Burnley District XI" against Burnley in September 1878. His first match for Lancashire in 1879 came in June, when he claimed four for 26 against Derbyshire; his best bowling that season. He claimed wickets consistently through the season, and finished with fifteen wickets from his seven matches at an average of 14.53. He only played three times for Lancashire in 1880, taking seven wickets at 16.28. He bowled with little effect in most of 1881, but took ten wickets in a match against Surrey at the Oval. Across his other six matches that year, he only claimed three further wickets, and completed the season with thirteen wickets at an average of 7.15.

The 1882 season was Crossland's best; though he started with a wicket-less match against the Marylebone Cricket Club. He took seven wickets against the touring Australians in early June, while in the following match, against Somerset, he took six for 7 in the second innings, to help Lancashire to an innings victory. He took five wickets in an innings on ten occasions during the season, including twice in a match against Middlesex, to claim ten wickets in the match. Playing a match for Liverpool and District against the touring Australians, he took his best bowling figures in an innings that season, claiming seven wickets for 72. Crossland took a pair of five-wicket hauls against Surrey in late August to finish with eleven wickets in the match. His final match of the season was a further fixture against the Australians, in which he took eight wickets in the match for the North. In all, Crossland took 112 first-class wickets at an average of 10.06 in 1882, topping the national bowling averages. Lancashire were recognised by some publications as being champion county, or more commonly as joint champions with Nottinghamshire in 1882, and in addition to Crossland, Lancashire's George Nash, Dick Barlow and Alexander Watson took fifty or more wickets at an average of under thirteen.

== Throwing controversies ==
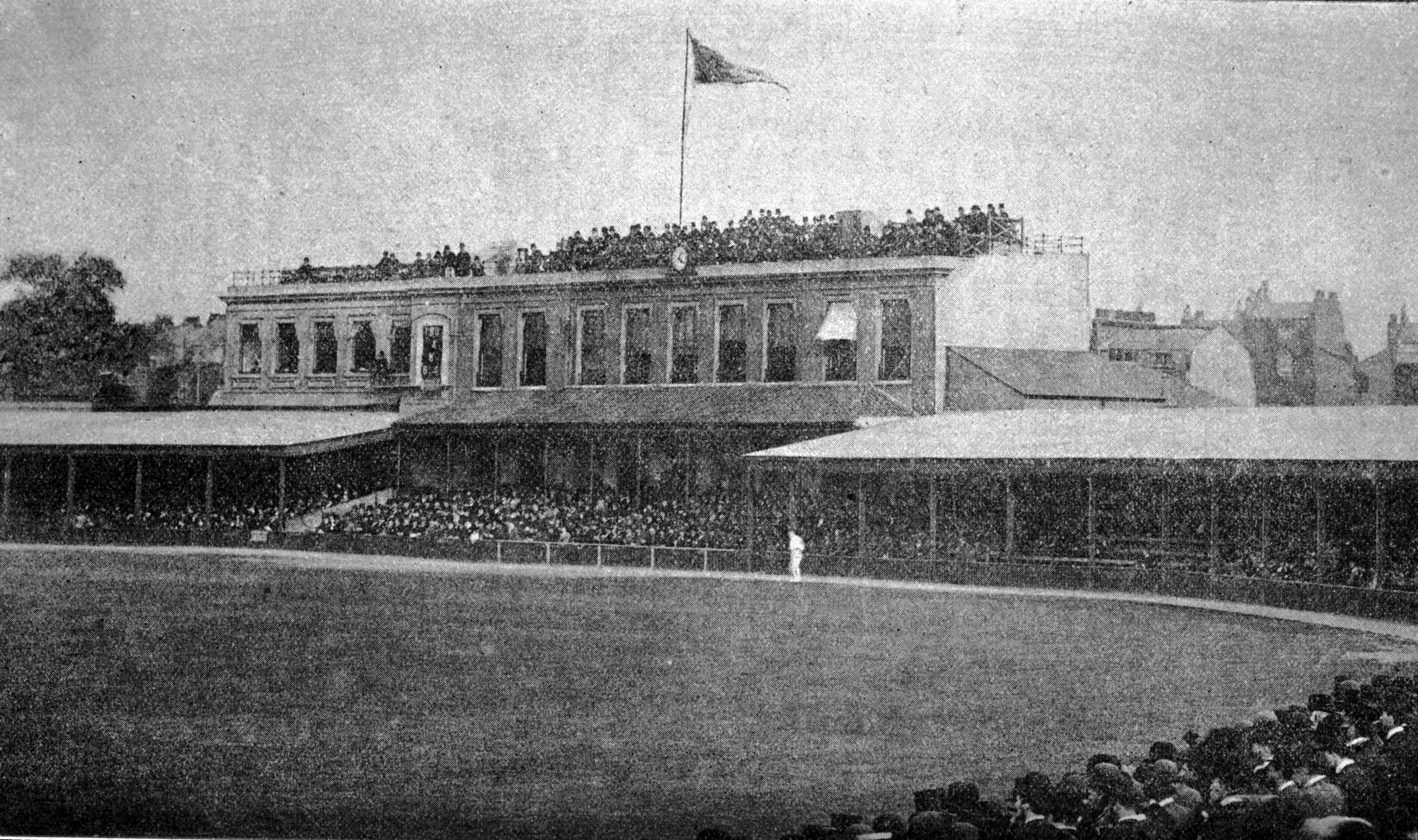
Protests about Crossland's bowling at the Oval in 1882 and 1883 drew attention to the matter.

Crossland's delivery was the cause for much discussion throughout his most successful year of 1882, but despite a commonly held view that he threw the ball, umpires never called a no-ball against him for throwing in first-class matches. His bowling action during the match against Surrey at the Oval was the subject of significant complaints from the crowd, who accused him of throwing. During his bowling spell, he was heckled by the crowd, with shouts of "well-thrown" and "take him off", and he was later surrounded by Surrey supporters when he returned to the changing rooms. The Times addressed the issue in their match report, with a reminder that the umpires are the "judges of fair or unfair play", while the gossip columnist in Cricket: A Weekly Record of the Game suggested that it was "very obvious and frequent infringement of the laws defining bowling", and that it was clear that umpires lacked the expertise and the bravery to no-ball a bowler.

A week after the match against Surrey, the only Test match of the Australian's tour was played, also at the Oval. In his obituary in Wisden Cricketers' Almanack, it was suggested that were it not for the accusations of throwing against Crossland, he would have been selected for the match. Cricket agreed, submitting that due to Fred Morley's absence from the England team due to injury, Crossland was the obvious choice to replace him, as he was the best fast bowler in the country. Despite this, they said that his non-selection showed that his action was not deemed fair by the selection panel. The Morning Post went a step further, and claimed that as Crossland had demonstrated he was England's best fast bowler, he should be selected to play in the Test match if his action was deemed fair, but that if it was not considered fair, he should not be allowed to continue to play for Lancashire either. An article written for The Argus, a Melbourne-based daily newspaper, by an unnamed member of the Australian side in 1882 reported that Crossland bowled; "with a delivery so like a throw that I feel sure it would not be allowed in Australia; but, as we all know, throwing in England is just as common as bowling – more's the pity", and it was speculated that the Australian team would have protested had Crossland been chosen for the Test match.

In 1883, Middlesex refused to arrange matches with Lancashire due to the perceived unfair bowling of Crossland and some of his teammates. Nottinghamshire had their own complaints, and protested to the MCC regarding Crossland's residential qualification to play for Lancashire. During the previous season, a letter had been written to Cricket magazine suggesting that Crossland's qualification for Lancashire was invalid, as they claimed that although he was engaged on the Old Trafford ground staff for the summer, he continued to reside in Sutton-in-Ashfield during the winter. Crossland was summoned to Lord's over the matter, but the Lancashire committee refused to send him, stating that he was playing for them that day. The protest was eventually dismissed, though the MCC noted that "it would be of value ... to have the evidence on both sides for future reference." Neutral umpires were introduced in 1883, (Note: Prior to the 1883 season, both teams supplied an umpire each for their matches.) and there was some concern in Lancashire about whether Crossland would be no-balled during the first match of the year. The match against Derbyshire featured one of the most highly regarded umpires, Thomas Brownhill from Yorkshire, and Crossland bowled without censure. In June that season, Crossland travelled as part of the Lancashire team to Lord's, to play against the Marylebone Cricket Club. The umpires for the match had been advised to be strict in applying the law on throwing, and it was noted in the press that Crossland had modified his bowling action, and no complaints could be made against it. The Daily News did suggest that "if [Crossland] always bowled as he bowled yesterday there would be no disputes about him—and he would not get many wickets."

He generally continued to bowl effectively during 1883, and peaked towards the end of the season, claiming seven wickets in an innings against "The Rest" while playing for a combined Lancashire and Yorkshire side, another seven in an innings for Lancashire against Surrey, and the best bowling figures of his career, eight for 57 for the North against the South. During the match against Surrey, the complaints from the crowd were again strong, and such were the vehemence of the protests, they almost drew the Lancashire captain, A. N. Hornby to refuse to complete the match. Crowd protests were also made at Clifton where Lancashire faced Gloucestershire, but W. G. Grace, who was batting at the time, warned the crowd to stop, or he would close the ground. In an end of season match for Dick Barlow's XI against Tom Emmett's XI; he scored his highest first-class score with the bat, reaching 51 runs in the second innings. He took 72 wickets in 1883 at an average of 12.97, placing him third in the national bowling averages. Lancashire's policy of recruiting professional bowlers without much regard for their qualification to play for the county caused some bad-feeling with other counties, most notably Crossland's native Nottinghamshire. The bickering between the counties escalated and in 1883, after receiving a provocative Christmas card from Lancashire, the Nottinghamshire committee sent an aggressive response:

LANCASHIRE COUNTY CRICKET. The only rules necessary for players in the County Eleven are that they shall neither have been born in, nor reside in, Lancashire. Sutton-in-Ashfield men will have the preference.

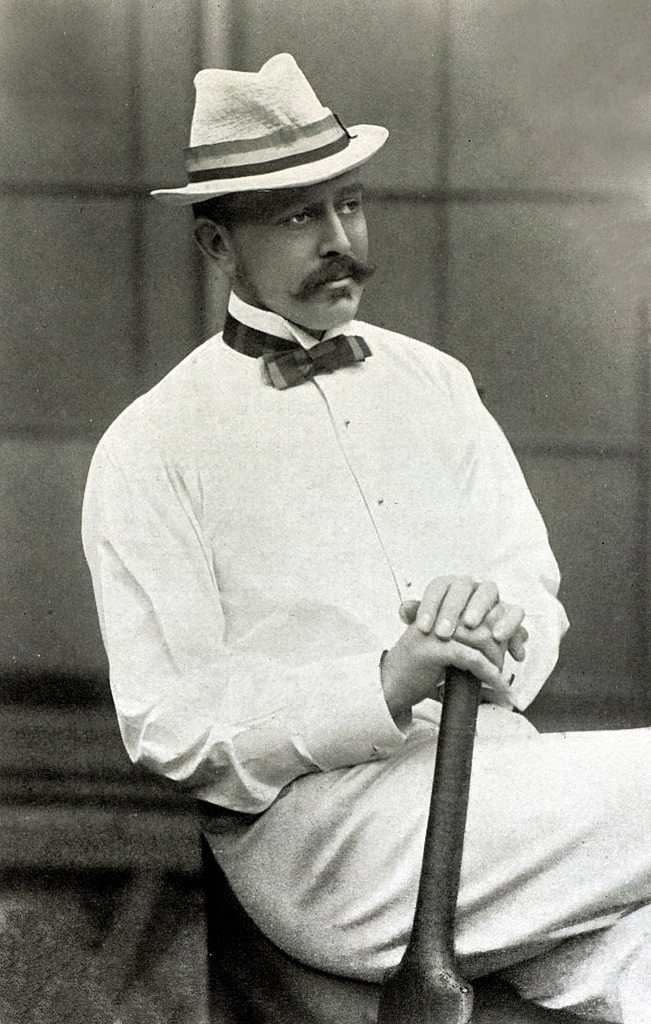
Kent's captain, Lord Harris, campaigned vigorously against throwing and took particular issue with Lancashire's bowlers.

At the end of the 1883 season, a meeting of county representatives at Lord's was held, during which a proposal was made "that the undermentioned counties agree among themselves not to employ any bowler whose action is at all doubtful." The proposal was essentially a gentlemen's agreement to try and prevent unfair bowling, necessitated by the umpires' refusal to intervene. The resolution was signed by representatives from Derbyshire, Kent, Middlesex, Nottinghamshire, Surrey and Yorkshire, but those from Gloucestershire and Sussex refused to sign it, along with Alexander Rowley from Lancashire. During the meeting, Hornby defended Crossland's action, saying that "he had never seen Crossland bowl otherwise than fairly." As a result, Middlesex were joined by Nottinghamshire and Cambridge University in boycotting Lancashire in 1884. Crossland was strong again, and claimed ten wickets in a match on three occasions, first against Oxford University in late May–early June. In his next match, for the North against the South, he claimed seven wickets in each innings to record match figures of fourteen for 80. The crowd at Lord's followed the example previously set at the Oval, heckling Crossland throughout the match. He collected seven wickets in an innings again, in a match not classified as first-class against Leicestershire, and completed the ten-wicket haul with four wickets in the second innings. He faced the touring Australians twice during June, taking two wickets for the North, before collecting eleven wickets for Liverpool and District. The report in The Argus once again vilified Crossland, writing that "owing principally to the successful throwing of Crossland" the Australian first innings closed for 140.

Crossland was named in the initial twelve-man squad for the first Test against Australia, which was played at Lancashire's Old Trafford ground. An official from the home ground chose the England team for each match. Lord Harris announced that he would not participate in the Test at Old Trafford if Crossland was selected. As a result, Lord Harris was withdrawn from the team and replaced by Tim O'Brien, although in the end Crossland did not play either. Lord Harris, who was both the captain of Kent and England in 1884, led the protests against throwing. He forced the retirement of two of Kent's bowlers, but was reasonably satisfied with Lancashire in 1884: for their match against Kent at Old Trafford, they dropped Nash, and by the meeting of the two sides in August that year, neither Crossland nor Nash were in the side. Lord Harris had hoped that this indicated that Lancashire were making efforts to "of [their] own free will, and without agreement with other counties, to place [their] eleven in an irreproachable position", though Lancashire later clarified that Crossland had only missed the match as he was suffering from a shoulder injury; while Nash's bowling was not suited to the hard pitches those matches were played on. Crowd protests against Crossland spread; there was trouble during matches at both Yorkshire and Derbyshire in 1884. Towards the end of that season, the London Truth reported that during a club match in his home town of Sutton-in-Ashfield, Crossland was no-balled by an umpire on account of throwing. Upon this, Crossland demanded the umpire retire from the match, and when the opposing captain refused, the match was abandoned. Crossland then announced, via the town crier, that his bowling would "pass unquestioned" in his next county match.

== Termination of county cricket career ==
In 1885 Lancashire once again were unable to face either Middlesex or Nottinghamshire as the two sides maintained their boycott. Crossland was chosen to appear for Charles Thornton's England XI against Cambridge University, in which he took seven wickets for 117. In late May, he took four for 52 and three for 51 against Kent at Old Trafford. When Lord Harris was clean bowled by Crossland, the Lancashire crowd "seemed fairly beside themselves with delight. Hats and coats were thrown up" according to the Manchester Guardian, which also observed that some felt Crossland had achieved his revenge against Lord Harris. After the match, Lord Harris, unhappy with the return of Crossland and Nash to the Lancashire side, requested that the Kent committee cancel the home fixture against Lancashire. The committee agreed with his argument, and Kent became the third first-class county to refuse to play against Lancashire. Crossland only played six matches for Lancashire in 1885 before, acting upon objections raised by Nottinghamshire County Cricket Club, the Marylebone Cricket Club ruled that he had breached his residency qualification by returning to live in Sutton-in-Ashfield during the winter period. Due to this, he was not allowed to play for Lancashire, effectively ending his first-class career. Nash retired from county cricket at the end of 1885 due to criticisms about his own action, and fixtures between Lancashire and Middlesex, Nottinghamshire and Kent resumed in 1886. Crossland played two further first-class matches, in 1886 and 1887, both for Charles Thornton's XI against Cambridge University.

== Later life and career ==
Crossland remained in Lancashire after his expulsion from their county side, playing for a variety of club sides; East Lancashire from 1885 to 1889, Church and Oswaldtwistle in 1890 and Colne in 1891. He also worked in a coal pit at Clayton-le-Moors. He died on 26 September 1903 in Blackburn. His burial was paid for by Lancashire County Cricket Club.

== Playing style and legacy ==
At his peak in 1882, Crossland was considered one of the fastest bowlers in England, and his yorker was described as W. G. Grace as being "exceedingly difficult to play." In his Wisden obituary, it was reported that "the majority of experts having no hesitation in describing him as a rank thrower." Grace was scarcely kinder, noting that he was "inclined to think that he ought to have been no-balled in every over." Despite the widespread opinion against his action, the umpires, themselves professional, were reluctant to no-ball him. There was a feeling in the press that the biggest fault lay with the cricket authorities; both the umpires and the MCC; The Daily News, echoed by Cricket magazine, said that "no blame can possibly attach to a bowler who continues a delivery which is habitual with him ... when the proper authorities decline [to signify] their disapproval of it." As a batsman, he was an aggressive tail-ender, while he was considered a good fielder with a long throw. In all first-class matches, Crossland claimed 322 wickets at an average of 10.95. He took ten wickets in a match on six occasions, and five wickets in an innings 25 times. He scored 1,172 runs with a high score of 51. Throwing in cricket came to a head in the early part of the twentieth century when the careers of a number of professional bowlers came to a close, most notably those of Lancashire's Arthur Mold, Somerset's Ted Tyler and Leicestershire's Frederic Geeson.

== Bibliography ==
- Altham, H.S.; Swanton, E.W. (1938) [1926]. A History of Cricket (Second ed.). London: George Allen & Unwin Ltd. OCLC 557645553.
- Barrett, Norman, ed. (1994). The Daily Telegraph Chronicle of Cricket. Enfield, Middlesex: Guinness Publishing. ISBN 0-85112-746-0.
- Bearshaw, Brian (1990). From the Stretford End: The Official History of Lancashire County Cricket Club. London: Partridge Press. ISBN 1-85225-081-X.
- Birley, Derek (1993). Sport and the making of Britain. Manchester University Press. ISBN 0-7190-3758-1.
- Birley, Derek (2007). A Social History of English Cricket. London: Aurum Press. ISBN 978-1-85410-941-5.
- Brooke, Robert; Goodyear, David (1991). A Who's Who of Lancashire County Cricket Club. Derby: Breedon Books Sport. ISBN 0-907969-85-2.
- Gordon, Sir Home (1939). Background of Cricket. London: Taylor & Francis. OCLC 314898699.
- Grace, W.G. (1980) [1899]. 'W.G.' Cricketing Reminiscences & Personal Recollections. London: The Hambledon Press. ISBN 0-9506882-0-7.
- Green, Benny, ed. (1979). Wisden Anthology 1862–1900. London: Queen Anne Press. ISBN 0-354-08555-7.
- Lewis, Tony (1987). Double Century. Sevenoaks, Kent: Hodder & Stoughton. ISBN 0-340-38336-4.
- Mortimer, Gavin (2013). A History of Cricket in 100 Objects. London: Serpent's Tail. ISBN 978-1-84668-940-6.
- Vamplew, Wray (2004). Pay Up and Play the Game. Cambridge University Press. ISBN 0-521-35597-4.
