= John Melling =

John Melling may refer to:

- John Melling (cricketer) (1848–1881), English cricketer
- John Melling (wrestler) (born 1971), British wrestler
- John Kennedy Melling (1927–2018), British accountant and writer and broadcaster on theatre.
