= Plungar =

Village in Leicestershire, England

Coordinates: 52.8966°N 0.85887°W

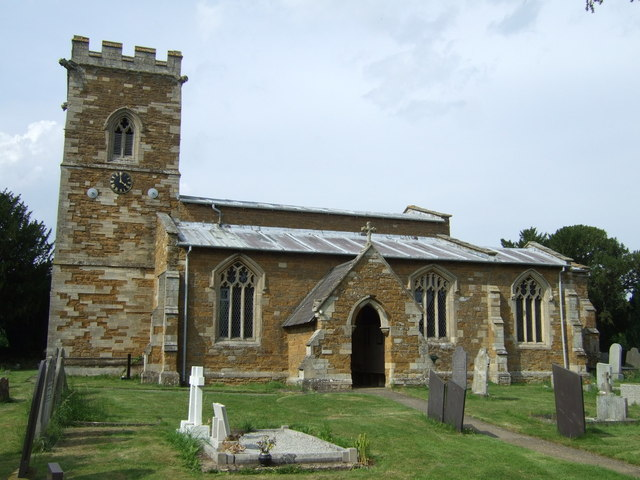
- St Helen's Church, Plungar

- Location within Leicestershire
- OS grid reference: SK768338
  - London: 100 mi (160 km) S
- Civil parish: Redmile
- District: Melton
- Shire county: Leicestershire
- Region: East Midlands
- Country: England
- Sovereign state: United Kingdom
- Post town: NOTTINGHAM
- Postcode district: NG13
- Dialling code: 01949
- Police: Leicestershire
- Fire: Leicestershire
- Ambulance: East Midlands
- UK Parliament: Melton and Syston

Plungar is a village and former civil parish, now in the parish of Redmile, and the Melton district of Leicestershire, England. It is about nine miles (14 kilometres) north of the market town of Melton Mowbray and seven miles (11 kilometres) west from Grantham. Plungar is adjacent to the Grantham Canal and stands in the Vale of Belvoir. In 1931 the parish had a population of 205.

== History ==
The Plungar name derives through the c. 1130 name "Plunard", itself from the Old English "plume" with the Old English "gara" or Old Scandinavian "garthr", meaning "Triangular plot where plum trees grow" or plum tree enclosure.

In 1870 Plungar was a village and civil parish, and part of the district of Bingham. Parish area was 1,310 acres (530 hectares) with a population of 251, and 59 houses. At the time a Wesleyan chapel was recorded.

Several Plungar children were educated at a free school in Barkestone. It had two rooms with a school house for a master and mistress. By 1830 the school had taught 14 children from Barkestone and 12 from Plungar, chosen by parish churchwardens. The lord of the manor was the Duke of Rutland. The population in 1830 was 280, including seven farmers, two tailors, two shoemakers, a bricklayer, a shopkeeper, a blacksmith, a wheelwright, a lace maker, an auctioneer, and the landlord of The Anchor public house. It also housed a parish curate and a gentleman.

=== Oilfield ===
An oilfield was discovered at the village in October 1953 by the Anglo-Iranian Oil Company (BP from 1954). This was the first onshore UK oilfield to be discovered since the end of World War Two. Oil was discovered at a depth of 2,817 feet (859 metres) and commercial production commenced in 1956. In 1958, UK onshore oil was 80,000 tons, mostly from Eakring and Plungar.

== Governance ==
On 1 April 1936 Plungar and the adjoining civil parish of Barkestone were merged with Redmile, sometimes known as Barkestone, Plungar and Redmile, which had a population of 829 in 2001.

== Amenities ==
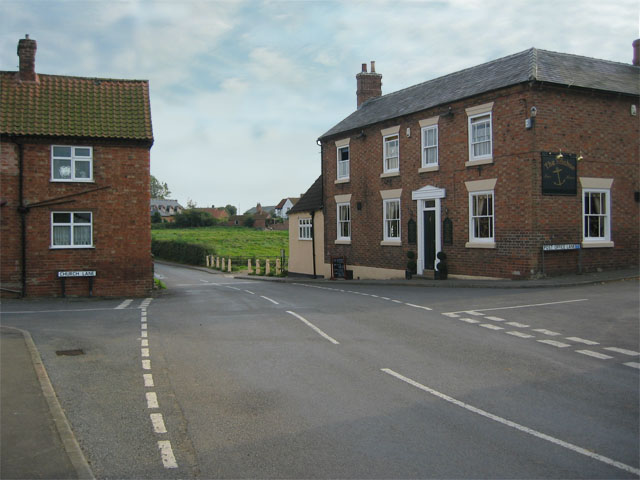
The Anchor, Plungar

The village public house, The Anchor, is close to the Grantham Canal. There is also a village hall.

Plungar lies on bus routes to Bottesford or Bingham to the north and Melton Mowbray to the south. All three destinations have railway stations, the nearest being at Bottesford (6 mi or 10 km), which has services to Nottingham and beyond, and to Grantham (for London) and Skegness.

The nearest primary school to Plungar is at Redmile. Bottesford has a primary, a secondary and an independent school.

== Landmarks ==
The parish church of St Helen dates from the 14th century, with additions made in the 15th. The church was repaired in 1829, while rebuilding work in 1855–1856 added a chapel and replaced the south aisle. The church was listed as Grade II* historic building in 1968.

To the east of the village, in neighbouring Nottinghamshire, is the site of Plungar's disused RAF air base, for No. 38 and No. 90 squadrons. A plaque at Plungar commemorates the crew of six of a Lancaster bomber, which crashed near Plungar in 1943. An obelisk to the dead of the First and Second World Wars stands in Harby Road.
