= Barkestone-le-Vale =

Village in Leicestershire, England

Coordinates: 52.89°N 00.84°W

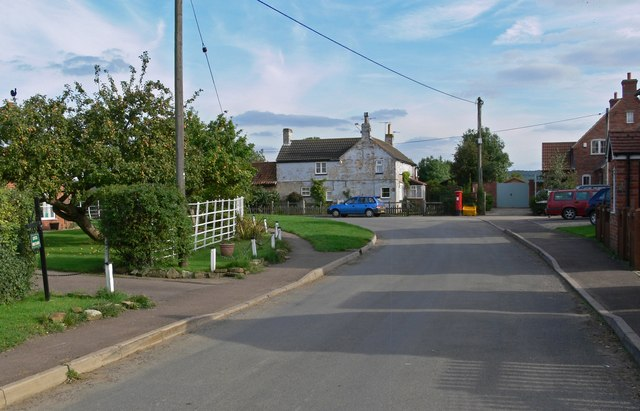
- Chapel Street, Barkestone-le-Vale

- Location within Leicestershire
- OS grid reference: SK7834
- Civil parish: Redmile
- District: Melton
- Shire county: Leicestershire
- Region: East Midlands
- Country: England
- Sovereign state: United Kingdom
- Post town: NOTTINGHAM
- Postcode district: NG13
- Dialling code: 01949
- Police: Leicestershire
- Fire: Leicestershire
- Ambulance: East Midlands
- UK Parliament: Melton and Syston

Barkestone-le-Vale is a village and (as just "Barkestone") a former civil parish, now in the parish of Redmile, in the Melton district, in the north east of Leicestershire, England. In 1931 the parish had a population of 238.

== History ==
The name Barkestone means "farm/settlement of Bark".

The village originated as a settlement in the 7th century. It features as a parish in the 1086 Domesday Book. On 1 April 1936 the parish was abolished and merged with Redmile.

== Heritage ==
There are 120 dwellings in Barkestone-le-Vale. The village had a primary school, which was closed in the late 1980s, by which time it had only 11 pupils. The school building was converted for residential use, as was the former mill house and a large derelict farmhouse.

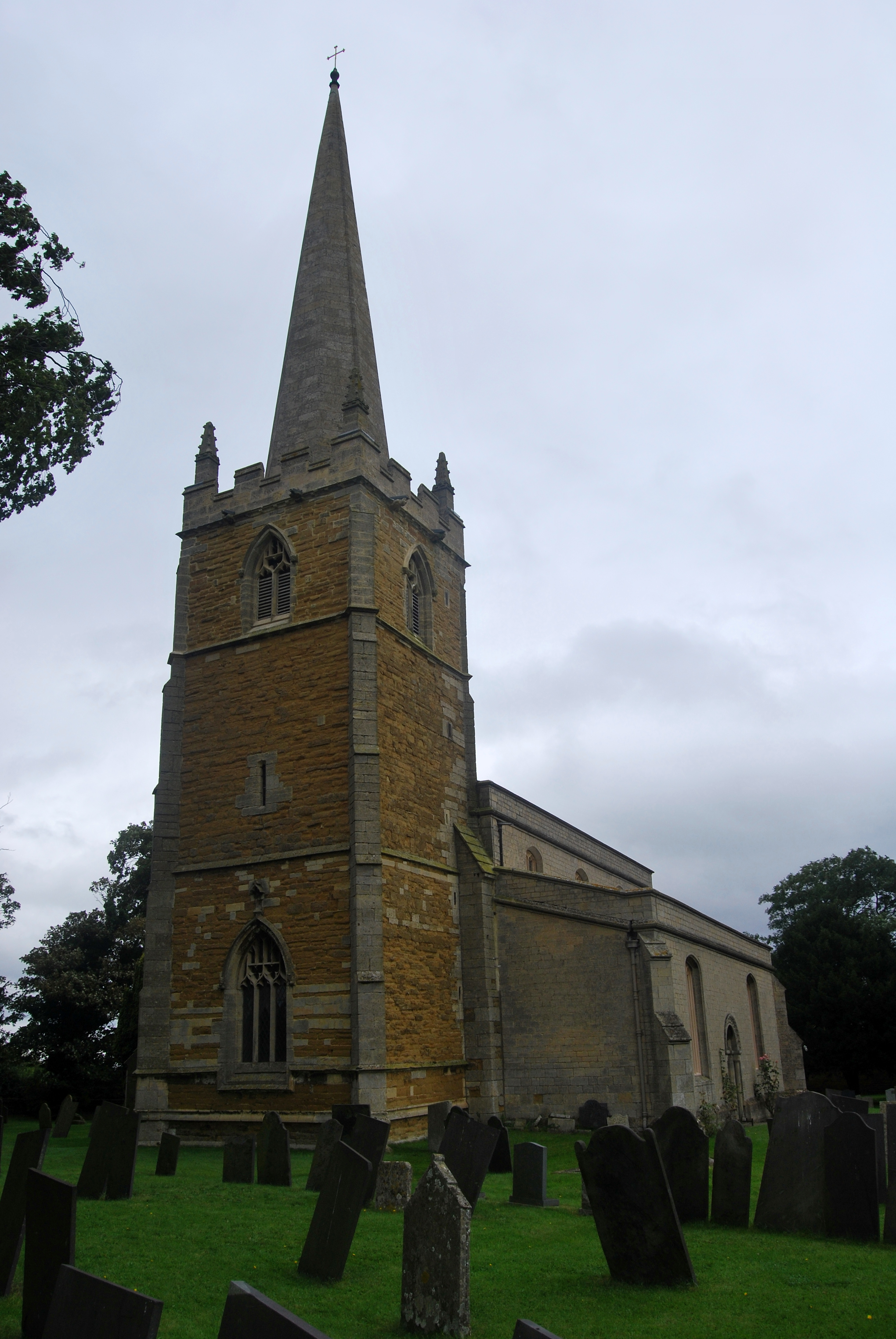
Church of St Peter and St Paul, Barkestone-le-Vale

The Church of St Peter and St Paul is a listed building Grade II* dating mainly from the 14th century with 15th-century additions. Most of the windows are in the Perpendicular style of Gothic. Parts of the church were rebuilt in 1840 and the whole was restored in 1857. The congregation belongs to the Vale of Belvoir group.

A Primitive Methodist chapel was built in 1825, but not mentioned in gazetteers later in the century. It closed for lack of support in 1927.

== Countryside ==
There are several footpaths serving the village, one of them linking it with Belvoir Castle. The rural countryside makes it suitable for bird-watching. Among the species seen round the village are the buzzard, the quail, and the reed and sedge warblers.

The Grantham Canal, which opened in 1797, is no longer in commercial use. It passes to the north and west of the village, parallel with the disused railway.

== Public transport ==
The nearest railway station is Bottesford (5½ miles, 8.9 km) on the Nottingham to Grantham/Skegness line. Redmile railway station (1½ miles, 2.4 km), with trains between Melton Mowbray and Grantham or Newark-on-Trent, closed to passengers in 1951.

Barkestone is served by daytime buses between Bottesford and Melton Mowbray six times a day on Monday to Saturday.

== Amenities ==
There is a primary school in Redmile (1.6 miles, 2.6 km). The nearest shops and a secondary school are in Bottesford (4.8 miles, 7.7 km). The village pub, The Chequers, has become a bar and grill, open most evenings. Plungar (1 mile, 1.6 km) has the nearest traditional pub, The Anchor. The local post office opens for only two hours a week.
