= Bottesford South railway station =

Former railway station In Leicestershire, England

Coordinates: 52.94157°N 0.81398°W

Bottesford South

General information
- Location: Bottesford, Leicestershire; England
- Grid reference: SK798389
- Platforms: 2

Other information
- Status: Disused

History
- Pre-grouping: Great Northern and London and North Western Joint Railway

Key dates
- 1 September 1879: Opened
- 1 May 1882: Closed
Location

Bottesford South railway station was a railway station serving the village of Bottesford, Leicestershire, on the Great Northern and London and North Western Joint Railway. It opened in 1879 and was served by LNWR trains running between Northampton and Newark and Great Northern Railway trains running between Melton Mowbray and Grantham. The station closed when the Northampton to Newark through service was withdrawn and replaced by an infrequent connecting service in 1882.

Former Services

Preceding station	Disused railways	Following station
Redmile	Great Northern Railway; Leicester Belgrave Road to Newark	Cotham
Redmile	Great Northern Railway; Leicester Belgrave Road to Grantham	Bottesford
