= Sedgebrook railway station =

Former railway station in Lincolnshire, England

Coordinates: 52.9351°N 0.7297°W

Sedgebrook

General information
- Location: Sedgebrook, Lincolnshire; England
- Grid reference: SK854383
- Platforms: 2

Other information
- Status: Disused

History
- Pre-grouping: Great Northern Railway
- Post-grouping: London and North Eastern Railway; Eastern Region of British Railways

Key dates
- 15 July 1850: Opened
- 2 July 1956: Closed
Location

Sedgebrook railway station was on the Nottingham to Grantham line in the East Midlands of England. The station lay between Bottesford and Grantham. It served a population of about 900 in the villages of Sedgebrook and Allington and the hamlet of Casthorpe, all in Lincolnshire. It was closed in 1956.

== The line ==
The line opened as the Ambergate, Nottingham, Boston and Eastern Junction Railway on 15 July 1850. It was then leased to the Great Northern Railway in 1855, but remained nominally independent until it was taken over by the London and North Eastern Railway in 1923.

Preceding station	Disused railways	Following station
Bottesford	Great Northern Railway; Nottingham to Grantham; Leicester Belgrave Road to Grantham	Grantham
