= Church of St Peter and St Paul, Barkestone-le-Vale =

Church in Barkestone-le-Vale, Leicestershire

Coordinates: 52°54′23″N 0°50′42″W

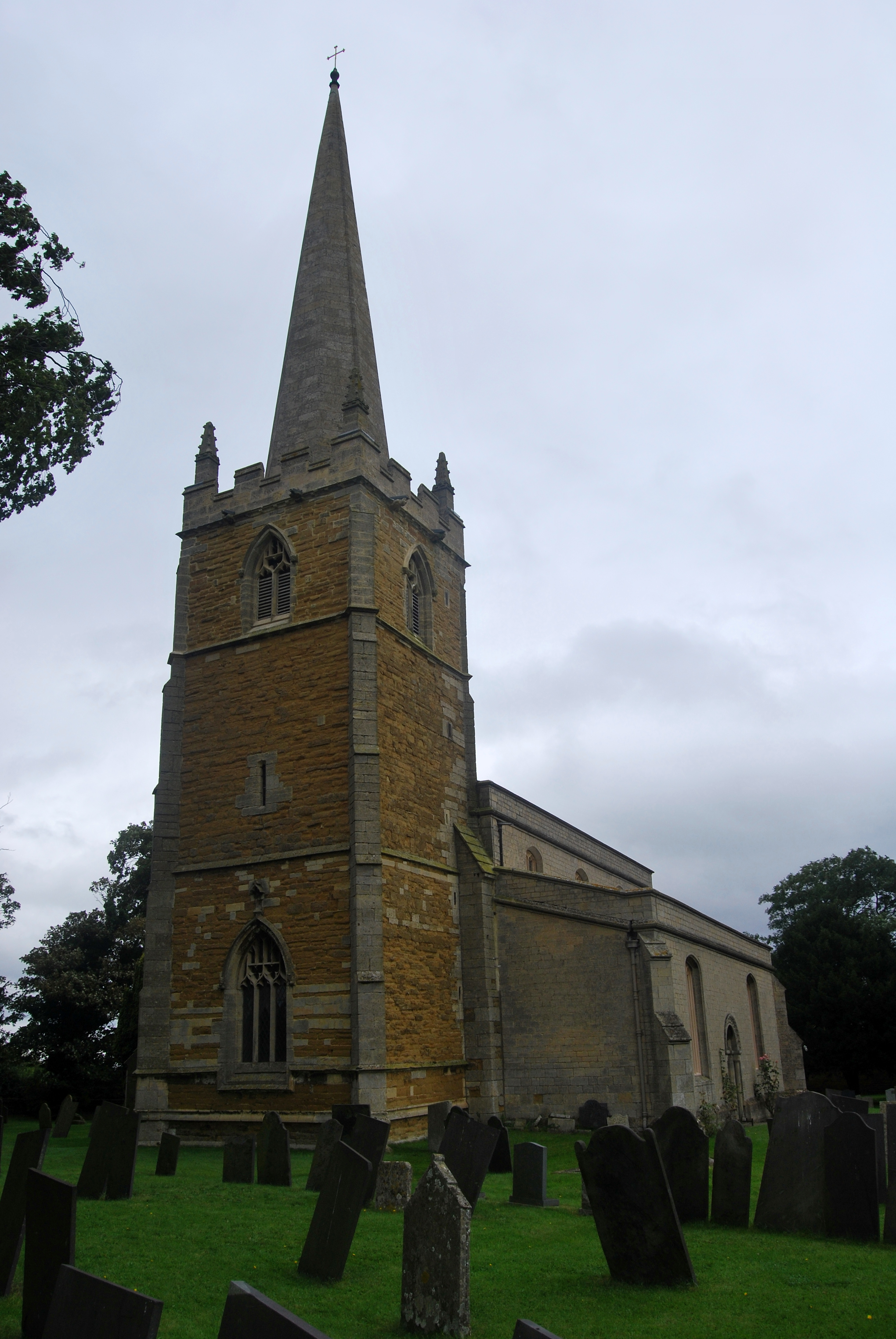
- Denomination: Church of England

History
- Dedication: St Peter, St Paul

Administration
- Diocese: Leicester
- Archdeaconry: Leicester
- Parish: Barkestone-le-Vale, Leicestershire

Clergy
- Rector: Ann Dunlop

The Church of St Peter and St Paul is a church in Barkestone-le-Vale, Leicestershire, England. It is a Grade II* listed building.

== History ==
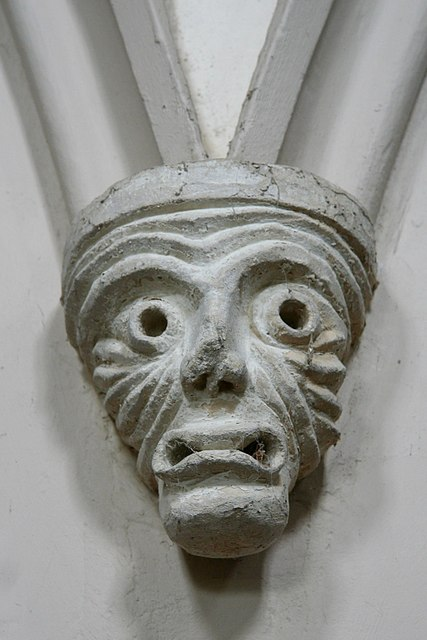
Label stop in the north arcade of the church, such figures were intended to portray a vision of hell to medieval parishioners

The church is mostly 14th century but with some 15th century additions. Several of the windows are built in the Gothic style. In 1840, the nave, north aisle, clerestory, tower and chancel were rebuilt, and the south aisle built. The whole church was then restored 17 years later.

The congregation belongs to the Vale of Belvoir group.
