= Elton and Orston railway station =

Railway station in Nottinghamshire, England

Coordinates: 52°57′06″N 00°51′21″W

Elton and Orston
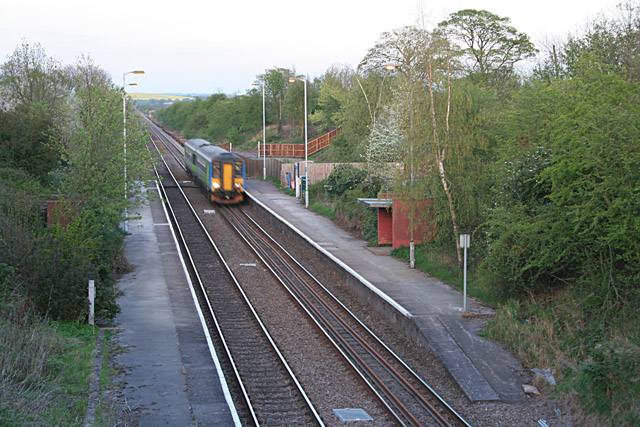

General information
- Location: Elton on the Hill, Rushcliffe; England
- Grid reference: SK770400
- Manager: East Midlands Railway
- Platforms: 2

Other information
- Station code: ELO
- Classification: DfT category F2

History
- Opened: 15 July 1850
- Original company: Ambergate, Nottingham, Boston and Eastern Junction Railway
- Pre-grouping: Great Northern Railway
- Post-grouping: London and North Eastern Railway

Passengers
- 2021/22: ▲40
- 2022/23: ▲56
- 2023/24: ▲212
- 2024/25: ▼68
- 2025/26: ▲102
Location
Notes
- Passenger statistics from the Office of Rail and Road

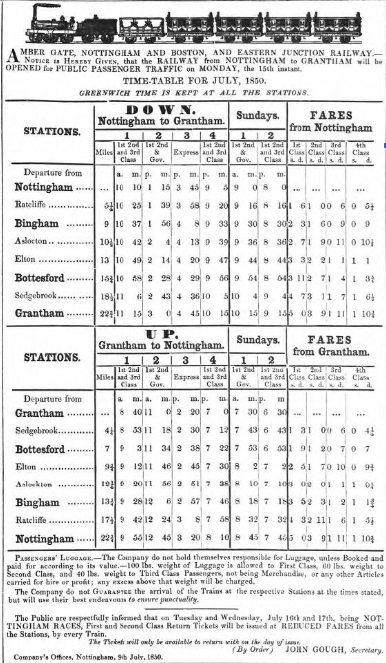
Timetable of the services for July 1850 from the Nottinghamshire Guardian, Thursday 11 July 1850

Elton and Orston (formerly Elton) railway station serves the villages of Elton on the Hill and Orston in Nottinghamshire, England. It is owned by Network Rail and managed by East Midlands Railway, but now provides minimal rail services.

== History ==
The station lies on the line first opened by the Ambergate, Nottingham, Boston and Eastern Junction Railway. Passenger services began on 15 July 1850. The line was taken over by the Great Northern Railway in 1855. The master's lodge and ticket office building was designed by Thomas Chambers Hine.

From 7 January 1963 passenger steam trains between Grantham, Bottesford, Elton and Orston, Aslockton, Bingham, Radcliffe-on-Trent, Netherfield and Colwick, Nottingham London-road (High Level) and Nottingham (Victoria) were replaced by diesel multiple-unit trains.

Images show how the station looked in 1967. No station buildings by Hine survived by 2008. There is a small 1980s brick-built shelter on one platform. The name of the station was still "Elton" in 2004.

The 2021/22 statistics recorded only 40 entries/exits at the station, and in 2024/25 recorded only 68, making it Britain’s least used station in those periods. It is Nottinghamshire's least used station and is one stop down the line from Leicestershire's least used station, Bottesford.

== Services ==
The station is unstaffed and offers no facilities other than two shelters, bicycle storage, timetables and modern "Help Points". The full range of tickets for travel can be purchased from the guard on the train at no extra cost. There are no retail facilities at the station.

On weekdays there is one service to Nottingham per day at 07:04 and one service to Skegness per day at 17:12. On Saturdays there is one service to Nottingham at 05:57 and one service to Skegness at 17:10. There is no Sunday service. The service operates on most bank holidays.

Two bus routes pass by the station, although no fixed bus stop has been provided.

Preceding station	National Rail	Following station
Aslockton	East Midlands Railway Nottingham–Grantham line Mondays–Saturdays only	Bottesford
	Historical railways	
Aslockton; Line and station open	Great Northern Railway; Nottingham to Grantham	Bottesford; Line and station open
Aslockton; Line and station open	Great Northern Railway; Nottingham to Newark	Cotham; Line and station closed
