= Cotham railway station =

Former railway station in Nottinghamshire, England

Coordinates: 53.0066°N 0.8117°W

Cotham
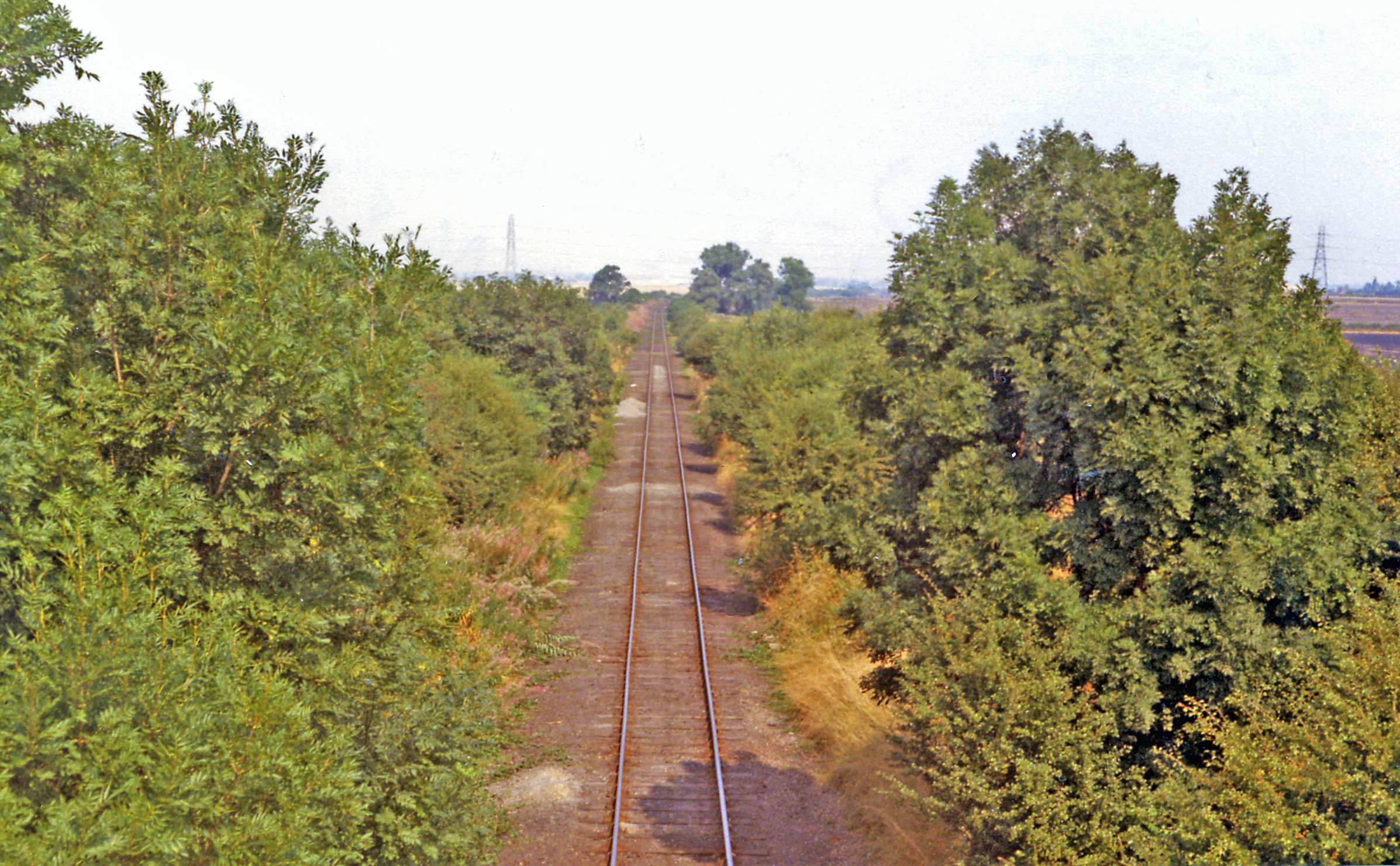
- Site of the station in 1983

General information
- Location: Cotham, Nottinghamshire; England
- Grid reference: SK798460
- Platforms: 2

Other information
- Status: Disused

History
- Pre-grouping: Great Northern Railway
- Post-grouping: LNER

Key dates
- 15 December 1879: Opened
- 11 September 1939: Closed
Location

Cotham railway station was a railway station serving the village of Cotham, Nottinghamshire. It was the only intermediate station on the Great Northern Railway Newark to Bottesford line, which was effectively a northern continuation of the Great Northern and London and North Western Joint Railway. It opened in 1879. It was served by through services to the joint line, but only one of these remained in 1910 and this had been withdrawn by 1922. Although Cotham station itself closed in 1939 occasional passenger services between Nottingham to Newark continued to use the line until 1955. The singled branch line was then freight only until it closed on 16 April 1987. The track was lifted in 1988. The line from Bottesford West Junction to Newark had remained in use until 1987 mainly for oil trains from Immingham on the River Humber to an oil refinery at Rectory Junction, Colwick. After closure of the line these trains ran via Nottingham or Grantham.

Preceding station	Disused railways	Following station
Bottesford South	Great Northern Railway; Leicester Belgrave Road to Newark	Newark North Gate
Elton	Great Northern Railway; Nottingham Victoria to Newark	Newark North Gate
