= Grantham rail accident =

Rail accident in Lincolnshire on 19 September 1906

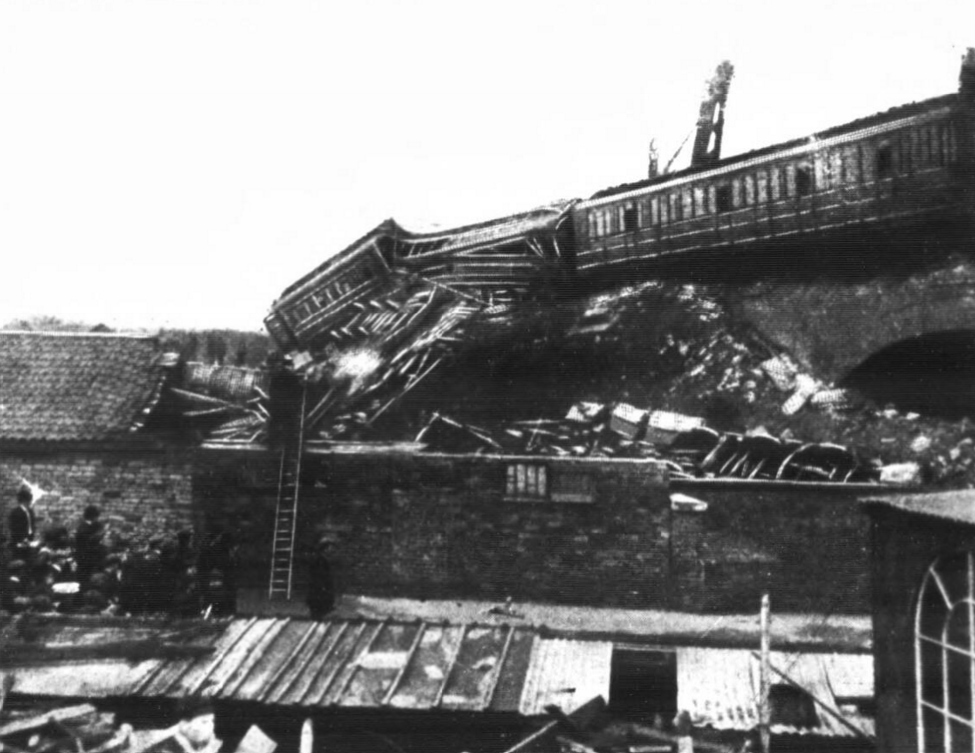
- Only the rearmost three carriages remained on the track

Details
- Date: 19 September 1906; 23:04
- Location: Grantham, Lincolnshire
- Coordinates: 52.9097°N 0.6467°W
- Country: England
- Line: East Coast Main Line
- Cause: Driver's error

Statistics
- Trains: 1
- Deaths: 14
- Injured: 17

The Grantham rail accident occurred on 19 September 1906. An evening Sleeping-Car and Mail train of the Great Northern Railway, running from London Kings Cross to Edinburgh Waverley hauled by Ivatt 'Atlantic' No 276 derailed, killing 14. The accident was never explained; the train ran through Grantham station, where it was scheduled to stop, and derailed on a set of points on a sharp curve at the end of the platform, which at the time had been set for a freight train. No reason was ever established as to why the train did not stop as scheduled, or obey the Caution and Danger signals.

== Events ==
Late in the night of 19 September, the Semi-Fast Mail train was due to call at Grantham. The signalman at Grantham south had his down signals off, but the signalman at Grantham North had all of his down signals at danger and the junction points set from down main to down branch to protect a goods train crossing from the up Nottingham line to the up main line - across the down main line on which the Mail was approaching. It was a clear night with patchy rain, as the Mail roared towards the station passing the south box. When the headlights came into view at the end of the platform, the locomotive appeared to be going much too fast to stop. To the alarm of the postal sorters and the station staff who realised it was the Mail train, it sped towards Grantham North box where the points, which had a 15 mph (25 km/h) speed limit, were set against it. A loud explosion was heard and fire lit up the entire North yard. The locomotive rode the curve, but its long tender derailed on the reverse curve following it and swept away the parapet of an underbridge for 65 yards (60 m), before falling off the edge of it. This derailed the locomotive, which was slung broadside across both tracks. The carriages ran down the embankment after the bridge, and only the last three remained undamaged.

== Possible causes ==
Many explanations were put forward, such as the driver going mad, being drunk, taken ill or having a fight with the fireman. One possibility is that the driver had a seizure or "micro-sleep" and the inexperienced fireman did not realise until too late. The Board of Trade inquiry, conducted by Lieutenant colonel P. G. von Donop, concluded that "it is feared therefore that the primary cause of this accident must for ever remain a mystery." The railway historian and writer L. T. C. Rolt described the Grantham accident as "the railway equivalent of the mystery of the Marie [sic] Celeste".

=== Illness ===
Lt Col von Donop decided that a sudden illness on the part of the driver was the most likely cause of the accident, but admitted that there was no conclusive evidence for that or any other possible cause.

Evidence was received that the driver of the express, Fleetwood, had reported himself ill and unfit to work on three occasions during 1906 (for 12 days in February, ten days in May/June and 30 days in August/September). A GNR fireman also testified that in June, Fleetwood had been taken ill while on the footplate of the train they were working but continued to drive it safely to their destination, where he reported himself ill, made the return trip as a passenger and then took his six-day holiday leave, thus not reporting himself ill to his immediate superiors. On none of these occasions did Fleetwood consult a doctor, and since he made no call on the GNR's own sick-pay fund, the company did not require him to have any medical examination either while he was on leave or before return to work. (Lt Col von Donop called for the GNR to review these policies in his report.) The fireman with whom Fleetwood was taken ill, Brooks, and the driver's mother-in-law (who lived with him and acted as his housekeeper) both testified that he only ever claimed to be suffering from recurring sciatica, but there was no official medical evidence to corroborate or expand on this.

The other man on the engine of the train, Talbot, was not a footplateman. He was a premium apprentice at the GNR's Doncaster Works, in training to be a mechanical engineer. His knowledge of the route and the road his train was running on was not as extensive as a trained and experienced express train fireman and if his driver was incapacitated he might not have realised the situation in time and not known the junction points were not set for the main line, as both arms of the junction signals were on and gave no indication of which way the points were lying. The evidence of signalman Day at Grantham South box was that he had seen both men "standing looking out of their respective glasses in front of them, but they did not actually seem to be doing anything." Fireman Brooks stated that it had always been Fleetwood's habit, when approaching Grantham from the south, to shut off steam at the summit of Stoke Bank, then open the regulator slightly to let the train coast down the gradient to Grantham. He would shut off steam again at Saltersford (the signal box before Grantham), even when not booked to stop at the station. He would always sound the whistle at Grantham South box and, if stopping, sound it again on the approach to the station itself. No witnesses either on the train, in signal boxes or at the station reported any whistles coming from the train.

The platform staff at Grantham were sure that the train was travelling at over 40 mph (65 km/h). Initial news reports that the wrecked locomotive's regulator was open, indicating that the driver had not shut off the steam to the engine, were not interpreted the same way by the official enquiry - the regulator handle was found to be one-third open, but had also been bent from the impact of the crash, having been subject to a blow that would have pushed it open. The blower valve was also open, which would not have been the case when the locomotive was running, leading the investigator to conclude that steam had been shut off before the derailment.

=== Drunkenness ===
The inquiry heard evidence that Fleetwood was known to 'over-drink'. Two witnesses who were friends of the fireman, Talbot, stated that he had expressed concerns when he was to start working with Fleetwood because the driver had a reputation for drinking, and they discussed the possibility that Talbot would have to take over control of the engine from Fleetwood if he was incapable due to drink - Talbot saying that he would "be alright" and would try and "stun" Fleetwood if he resisted. However both witnesses also stated that Talbot did not say how he knew of Fleetwood's reputation and that on a later occasion, having worked for two days with Fleetwood, Talbot stated that the driver had been entirely sober and "all right so far". Other drivers and officials of the GNR, and Fleetwood's mother-in-law testified that, while he drank alcohol, he had never been seen drunk at work or at home, and Lt Col von Donop concluded that Talbot's initial fears were based only on hearsay from unknown sources. Fleetwood left home on the day of the accident with a basket containing food and two full bottles of tea, and there was no evidence that he drank before the journey started or that he ever left his engine at Peterborough.

=== Brake failure ===
Another theory, proposed in 2006 in the Railway Magazine, is a brake failure due to incorrect procedures when the engine was changed at the previous stop, Peterborough, but eyewitness accounts at Peterborough dispute this. Evidence take by the inquiry by both the shunter who attached the locomotive to the train at Peterborough (not fireman Talbot, as some have speculated) and the foreman who supervised the work confirmed that the brake system was attached properly and that the driver tested the brakes once they were connected. The guard travelling in the rear brake van testified that the vacuum gauge in his compartment was reading correctly during the journey to Grantham, while his colleague in the van near the front of the train reported that his vacuum gauge showed zero when he went to apply the brake just before the derailment. Both guards reported that the wheels of the vehicles they were travelling in were skidding just before the derailment, which was confirmed by witnesses who were in Grantham station as the train passed through, some of whom also reported sparks coming from the wheels. These reports would suggest that the braking system of the train was working correctly but was not applied until the last moments. The brake handle in the cab of the locomotive was examined, and found in the position to release the brakes, but had almost certainly been moved by the impact of the crash and no conclusions were drawn from its position. Fireman Brooks - who had worked as Fleetwood's fireman for four months before Talbot took his place - testified that Fleetwood was consistent in checking the operation of the brakes on a train when leaving a station.

=== Disorientation ===
Lt Col von Donop also considered whether the engine crew lost track of their position on a dark night and did not realise they were quickly approaching Grantham as the train picked up speed on a long downhill gradient. But the train's average speed throughout its journey from Peterborough was not excessive, even on the descent from Stoke Summit. A number of Great Northern footplate men testified that the approach to Grantham was unmistakable, and the investigator agreed (adding that even in the highly unlikely event that the driver was unsure of his position, signals were in any case set against his train and should have caused him to slow down). Von Donop did criticise the conduct of both of the train's guards, who should have been monitoring the train's position and its speed and could have signalled to the driver or applied the brakes themselves if they had realised they were not slowing for the booked stop at Grantham. The report noted that "The primary duty of a guard is the safe working of his train, and neither of these men seems to have shown himself on this occasion equal to his responsibilities."

=== Crew qualifications ===
Although the Board of Trade inquiry did not broach the subject, and von Donop accepted evidence from Talbot's superiors that he was "thoroughly competent to carry out [his] respective duties", other bodies stated concerns at letting unexperienced men act as firemen on express trains. Evidence submitted at the inquiry showed that Talbot, who had been with the GNR for five years, was nearing the end of his apprenticeship and for the 12 months before the accident (since August 1905) had been seconded to the railway's operating department to work on the footplate of the GNR's trains in service. These had included times travelling alongside a regular crew and acting as an inspector to record information about the running performance of the engines, a period spent examining brakes at York and times working as fireman on a variety of goods and passenger trains- a common practice on the GNR for engineering apprentices in order for them to gain practical experience of locomotive operations. Talbot had been officially 'passed' as a fireman by the GNR but was not yet officially rated as a driver. In over a year of work with the operation department Talbot had worked 119 days as a fireman and 50 days on the flootplate as an inspector.

After the accident, the Amalgamated Society of Railway Servants trade union made several resolutions and statements (including some by its general secretary Richard Bell who was also a Member of Parliament at the time) that apprentices should not be employed as firemen on express trains such as the one involved in the Grantham accident. These posts were usually taken by the most experienced firemen - often those already passed as drivers - who had many years of experience on the footplate and had built up detailed knowledge of the geography, features, lay-out and hazards of the routes they worked on. Despite Talbot's practical skill, the relatively short time he had worked on the footplate (only equivalent to a few months of regular work by a professional fireman) counted against him having the same working knowledge. The ASRS also expressed concern that having 'gentlemen' as fireman disrupted the established hierarchy on the footplate, with engineers/inspectors nominally being superior to drivers who none the less were officially responsible for the safe operation of the engine and supervision of the fireman. Mr. Bagely of the ASRS and Richard Bell both stated that a driver working with a 'gentleman apprentice' would not as freely instruct them or correct deficient performance as they would a regular fireman. They would also not be as trusting of their experience and so could feel forced to take on much of the duties usually done by the fireman, or shared between both men, which increased the chance of error or distraction. Conversely an apprentice acting as a fireman may not be as an effective assistant in terms of road knowledge as an express driver may have become used to. A GNR delegate to the ASRS conference in 1906 predicted that following the accident (and in line with restrictions already in place at several other railway companies) the GNR would no longer employ apprentices on the footplate as firemen, but only in an inspection role.

== Other derailments ==
The accident was the second in a series of three derailments due to excessive speed at night in a 16-month period. The others were at Salisbury (1906) and Shrewsbury (1907). All three resulted in deaths, including the footplate crews; the cause in each case was recorded as 'driver error' but there has been much speculation since.

== See also ==
- Lists of rail accidents
- List of British rail accidents
- Newark Bay rail accident, 1958 U.S. wreck where driver's decision to speed up towards an open drawbridge is similarly unexplained.

Other derailments in which the driver's momentary loss of attention was or may have been a factor:

- Moorgate tube crash
- 2016 Hoboken train crash
- Bourne End rail crash
- December 2013 Spuyten Duyvil derailment
