= Redmile =

Village in Leicestershire, England

Coordinates: 52.9108°N 0.81581°W

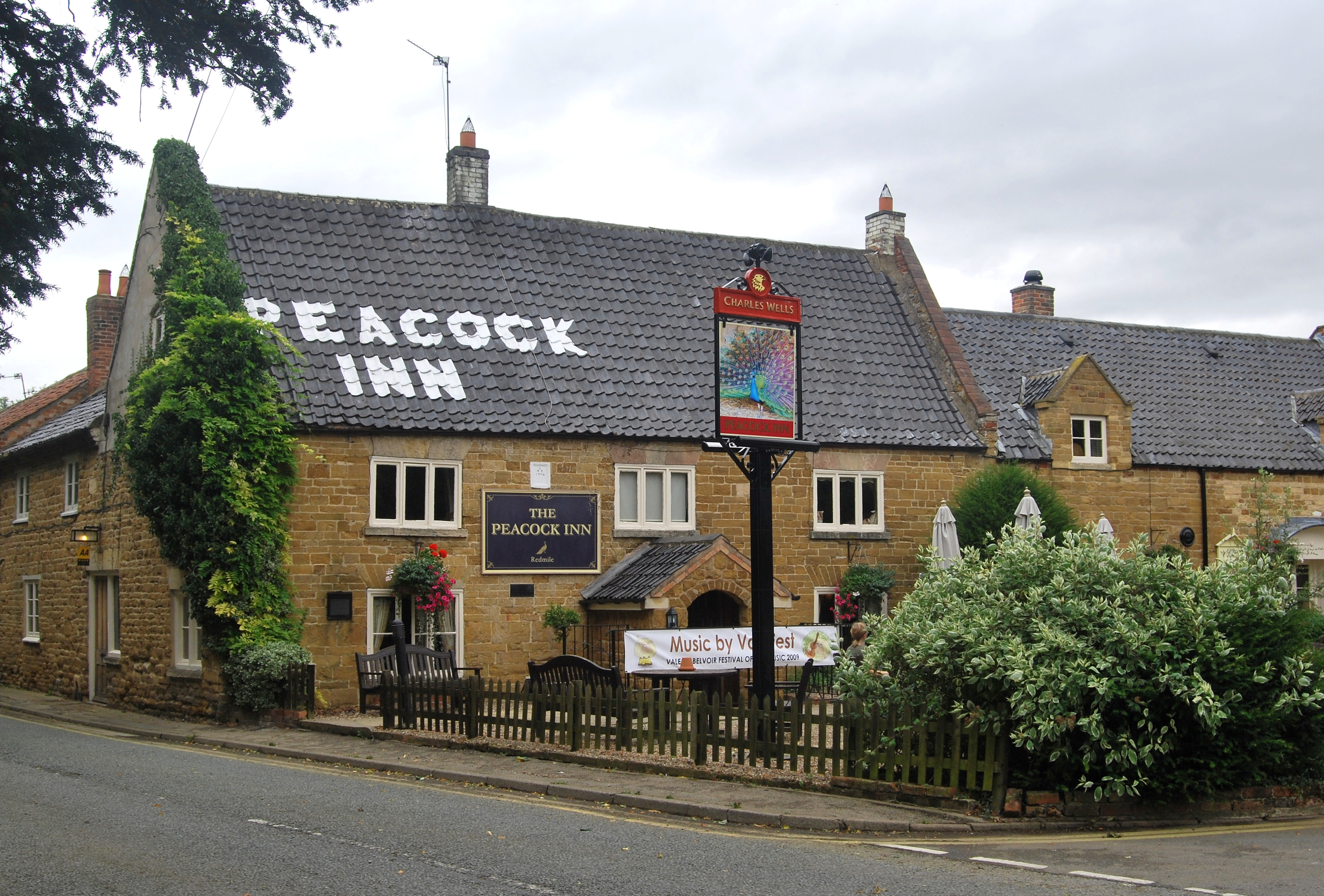
- Former public house, Redmile

- Location within Leicestershire
- Population: 921 (2011)
- OS grid reference: SK797354
  - London: 100 mi (160 km) S
- Civil parish: Redmile
- Shire county: Leicestershire
- Region: East Midlands
- Country: England
- Sovereign state: United Kingdom
- Post town: NOTTINGHAM
- Postcode district: NG13
- Dialling code: 01949
- Police: Leicestershire
- Fire: Leicestershire
- Ambulance: East Midlands
- UK Parliament: Melton and Syston

Redmile is an English village and civil parish in the Melton district of Leicestershire, about ten miles (16 km) north of Melton Mowbray and seven miles (11 km) west of Grantham. The population of the civil parish, which includes Barkestone-le-Vale and Plungar, was 921 at the 2011 census, up from 829 in 2001.

== Joint parish ==
The parish lies in the Vale of Belvoir close to the county boundary with Nottinghamshire to the west, where the nearest places are Granby, Sutton-cum-Granby and Elton on the Hill. Other places nearby are Bottesford, Belvoir, and Stathern. On 1 April 1936 the adjoining parishes of Barkestone and Plungar were merged into Redmile; the present-day parish is sometimes known as Barkestone, Plungar and Redmile.

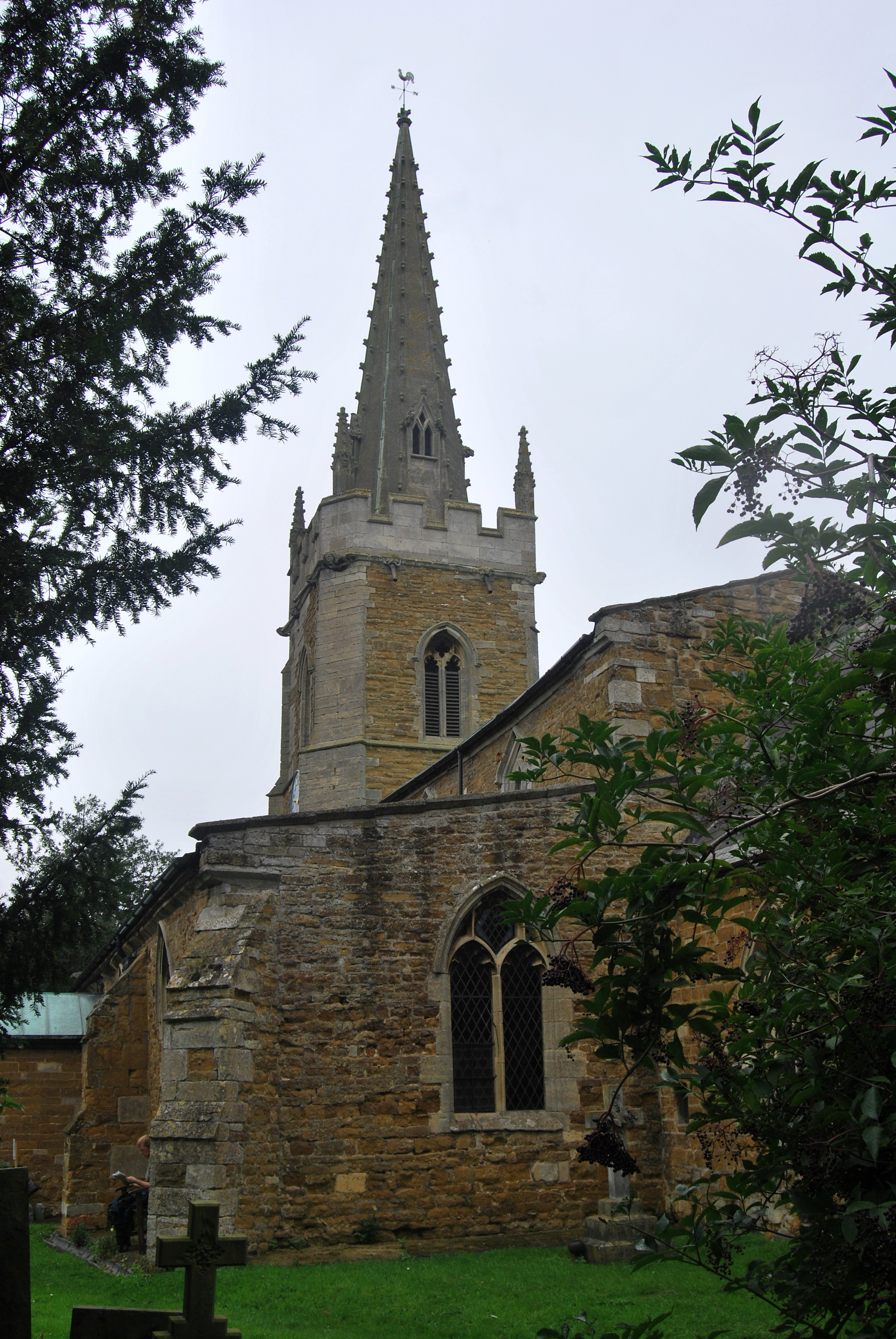
St Peter's Church, Redmile

== Amenities ==
Redmile has a Church of England primary school with about 70 pupils, which serves the whole parish. The original national school opened in 1839 and was rebuilt on the same site in 1871. New classrooms were added in 1999 and 2001 and a school hall in 2009. The most recent Ofsted report, in October 2013, found the school outstanding in all five of the main assessment criteria.

St Peter's Church dates from the 13th century: the earliest references are to an earlier building, to whose parish the prior of Belvoir Priory was patron in 1155 and whose first rector was installed in 1220. The parish is now served by the Vale of Belvoir Team. The present Church of England building is Grade II* listed and dates mainly from the 14th century, with additions and restorations in the 15th century and in 1840 and 1857. Three late 17th-century gravestones in the churchyard, also listed, exemplify a local type known as "Belvoir Angels", made of Swithland slate. One is dated 1690, making it the oldest such stone in the Vale.

The former Methodist Chapel, built in 1869, is now a private residence. There are ten other listed buildings in the village, some dating back to the 17th century.

Redmile has a pub, now doubling as restaurant: the Windmill Inn. The once-famed Peacock Inn closed in the mid-2010s.

== Screen appearances ==
Redmile was used as a filming location in most of the second-series episodes of the popular British comedy drama Auf Wiedersehen, Pet, about a group of seven British migrant construction workers, with the Windmill Inn serving as the Barley Mow. The village featured as the fictional town of Kings Oak in some location scenes for the 2001 revival of the television soap Crossroads.

== Transport ==
The village has a weekday daytime bus service to Melton Mowbray and Bottesford. The nearest railway station is at Bottesford (3.7 miles, 6.0 km) on the Nottingham to Grantham/Skegness line. Redmile and Belvoir railway station, on a line from Melton Mowbray North to Newark Castle station, with a branch at Bottesford for Grantham and Skegness, opened in 1879 but closed to passengers in 1951. The Grantham Canal to Nottingham opened in 1797 and closed in 1936. Short sections have reopened for leisure craft.

== Notable people ==
- Thomas Daffy (died 1680), who became rector of Redmile in 1666, invented a patent medicine, Daffy's Elixir, in about 1647.
- The Leicestershire cricketer Frederic Geeson (1862–1920) was born in Redmile.
- The international cricketer Luke Wright (born 1985) attended the village school.
