= Shrewsbury rail accident =

Train derailment in Shropshire, UK on 15 October 1907

Coordinates: 52°42′47″N 2°45′1″W

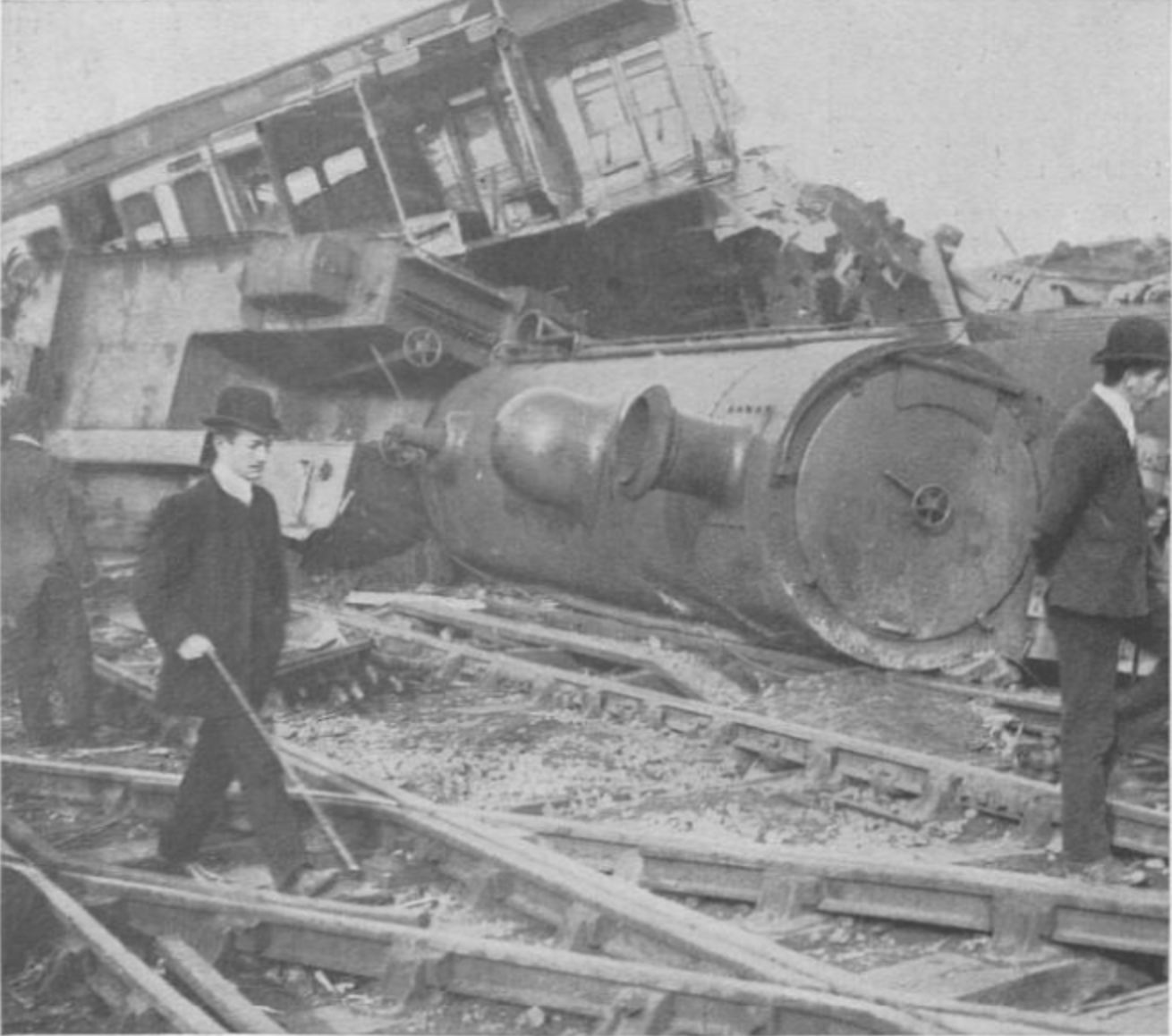
- From The Sphere, 19 October 1907

Details
- Date: 15 October 1907
- Location: Shrewsbury, Shropshire
- Country: England
- Line: Welsh Marches Line
- Incident type: Derailment caused by excessive speed
- Cause: Driver's error

Statistics
- Trains: 1
- Deaths: 18
- Injured: 33

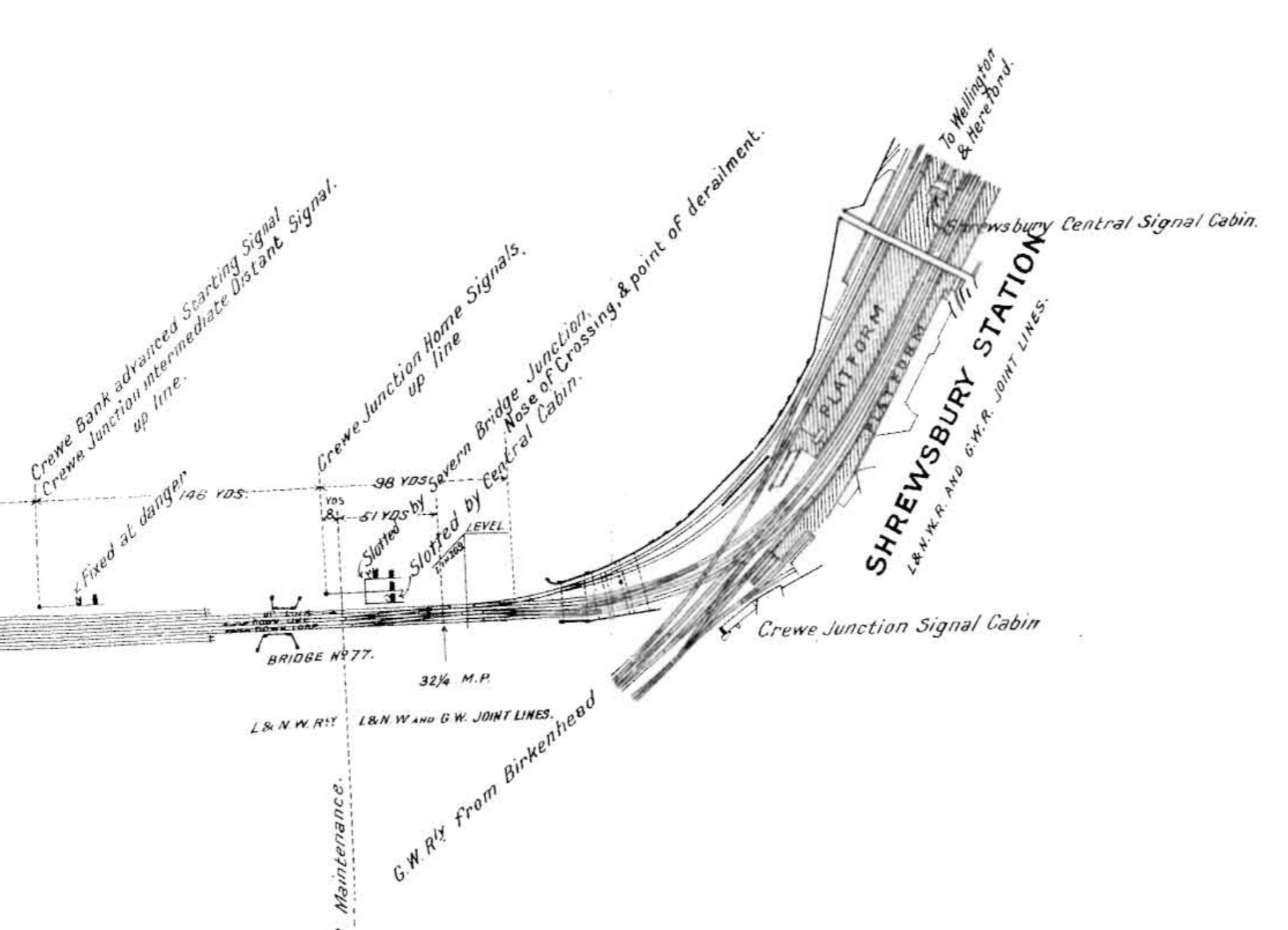
Diagram of the site of the accident; on this diagram, the train travelled from the left to the nose of the station points, where it derailed.

The Shrewsbury rail accident occurred on 15 October 1907. An overnight sleeping-car and mail train from Manchester to the West of England derailed on the sharply curved approach to Shrewsbury station, killing 18 people and injuring 33. The accident was concluded to be due to excessive speed on a dangerous curve.

== Casualties ==
Those killed were the engine driver and fireman, two guards, eleven passengers, and three Post Office sorters working in the Mail train. Thirty-three other people were reported injured.

== The train ==
Speed was estimated at 60 miles per hour (97 km/h) on a curve limited to 10 miles per hour (16 km/h). The train left Crewe at 01:20, having had extra carriages added (originating in Glasgow, York and Liverpool) to form a heavy, 15-carriage train, hauled by LNWR Experiment class 4-6-0 No. 2052 Stephenson.

== Other derailments ==
The accident was the last in a series of three derailments due to excessive speed at night in a 16-month period. The others were at Salisbury and Grantham (both in 1906). All three resulted in deaths, including the footplate crews; the cause in each case was recorded as 'driver error', but there has been much speculation since.

== Possible explanation ==
The day after the accident an official enquiry began, coinciding with an inquest into the driver and fireman. It was held in Shrewsbury and was attended by the President of the Board of Trade, David Lloyd George. It lasted three days, and the report was published on 12 February. No fault was found with the engine's brakes and reliability. After a detailed hearing into the health and sobriety of the driver, the finding was that alcohol and drugs were not present in his body from post-mortem examination and he had not suffered a seizure.

The report concluded the most likely explanation of the Shrewsbury crash was that the driver had dozed off briefly, missing the signal, and therefore had not braked in time on the downhill entry to Shrewsbury. The fireman was believed to have failed to recognize the driver's excessive speed until too late.

== Literary reference ==
An anonymous poem about the disaster was printed in the Shrewsbury Chronicle newspaper. It had been written by a young Meole Brace woman, Mary Meredith, after she read an account of the accident. (She was better known after her marriage as novelist Mary Webb). Her brother had submitted her poem to the newspaper without her knowledge. It drew appreciative letters to the paper and it is now believed to be Webb's first published writing.

== See also ==
- Lists of rail accidents
- List of British rail accidents
