= Frederic Geeson =

English cricketer

Frederic Geeson (23 August 1862 – 2 May 1920) was an English cricketer active from 1892 to 1913 who played for Leicestershire. He was born in Redmile, however towards the end of his lifetime he taught and coached cricket at King Edward VII School (Johannesburg), until his death in 1920. He appeared in 151 first-class matches as a righthanded batsman who bowled right arm medium pace and leg spin. He scored 3,694 runs with a highest score of 104* and took 472 wickets with a best performance of eight for 110.
