= John Kennedy Melling =

John Kennedy Melling (11 January 1927 – 10 October 2018) was a British accountant, writer and broadcaster on theatre.

Melling built a large collection of theatre ephemera and was a drama critic for The Stage for 30 years.

== Selected publications ==
- Southend Playhouses from 1793 (1969)
- Discovering Lost Theatres (1969)
- Discovering London's Guilds and Liveries (1973)
- Discovering Theatre Ephemera (1974)
- Murder Done to Death: Parody and Pastiche in Detective Fiction (1996)
