= Redmile railway station =

Former railway station in Leicestershire, England

Coordinates: 52.9169°N 0.8315°W

Redmile

General information
- Location: Redmile, Leicestershire; England
- Grid reference: SK786362
- Platforms: 2

Other information
- Status: Disused

History
- Pre-grouping: Great Northern and London and North Western Joint Railway
- Post-grouping: LNER & LMS Joint

Key dates
- 15 December 1879: Opened
- 10 September 1951: Closed
Location

Redmile railway station served the villages of Redmile and Barkestone-le-Vale, Nottinghamshire and also Belvoir Castle. It was on the Great Northern and London and North Western Joint Railway. It opened in 1879 and closed to passengers in 1951.

== Fuel deliveries ==
The station remained in use for oil deliveries into the 1980s. These were for Redmile Petroleum Storage Depot, constructed in the late 1930s and later expanded. A pumping station was added in 1943 as part of the pipeline network. The two tank farm sites were operated by Texaco until they were emptied in the early 1990s, after the end of the Cold War. There were four 500-ton and four 800-ton tanks originally equipped with both rail and road loading facilities. The rail facilities were removed in the 1980s, but the road loading gantry continued to operate until the tank farms were closed.

Former Services

Preceding station	Disused railways	Following station
Harby and Stathern	Great Northern Railway; Leicester Belgrave Road to Grantham; Leicester Belgrave Road to Newark	Bottesford South
