= John Melling (cricketer) =

English cricketer

John Melling (6 April 1848 – 31 January 1881) was an English cricketer active from 1874 to 1876 who played for Lancashire. He was born in Clayton-le-Moors and died in Burnley. He appeared in three first-class matches as a righthanded batsman, scoring 39 runs with a highest score of 20 and held four catches.
