= Bottesford railway station =

Railway station in Leicestershire, England

Bottesford
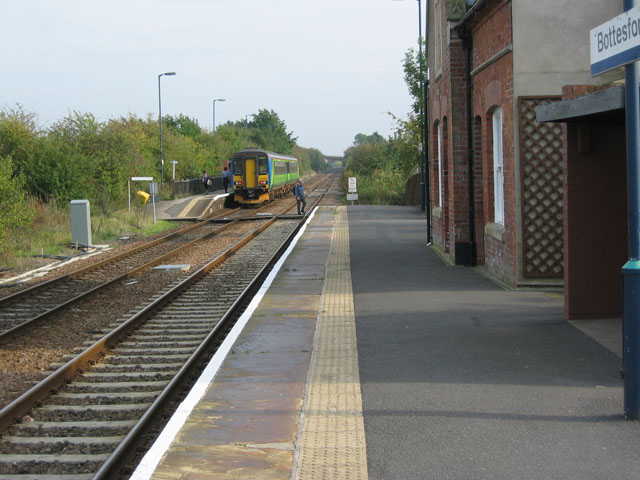

General information
- Location: Bottesford, Melton; England
- Coordinates: 52.94472°N 0.79529°W
- Grid reference: SK810392
- Manager: East Midlands Railway
- Platforms: 2

Other information
- Station code: BTF
- Classification: DfT category F2

History
- Opened: 15 July 1850
- Original company: Ambergate, Nottingham, Boston and Eastern Junction Railway
- Pre-grouping: Great Northern Railway
- Post-grouping: London and North Eastern Railway

Passengers
- 2021/22: ▲35,752
- 2022/23: ▲48,508
- 2023/24: ▲52,460
- 2024/25: ▲56,560
- 2025/26: ▲59,142
Location
Notes
- Passenger statistics from the Office of Rail and Road

Bottesford railway station serves the village of Bottesford in Leicestershire, England. The station is 15 miles (24 km) east of Nottingham, on the lines to Grantham and Skegness. It is the least used station in Leicestershire.

== History ==
The line through Bottesford was first opened by the Ambergate, Nottingham, Boston and Eastern Junction Railway on 15 July 1850, then taken over by the Great Northern Railway.

The station buildings were designed by Thomas Chambers Hine.

There was also a link to the old GNR Newark to Leicester cross-country route a short distance to the east; this remained in use for freight until 1988 but has since been lifted.

From 7 January 1963 passenger steam trains between Grantham, Bottesford, Elton and Orston, Aslockton, Bingham, Radcliffe-on-Trent, Netherfield and Colwick, Nottingham London-road (High Level) and Nottingham (Victoria) were replaced by diesel multiple-unit trains.

The station is now owned by Network Rail and managed by East Midlands Railway, which provides all rail services.

== Facilities ==
The station is unstaffed and offers limited facilities other than two shelters, bicycle storage, timetables and modern Help Points. The station does not have any ticket purchasing facilities, which means that all tickets must be purchased from the conductor on the train at no extra cost.

Plans to open a community garden on a derelict piece of land at the station started in early 2018. In June 2019, such a garden was opened by the Duchess of Rutland.

== Services ==
There is a daily service every hour or two hours westbound to Nottingham and eastbound to Skegness via Grantham. Several Grantham trains have connections to London King's Cross or to York.

An extra service to Liverpool stops every day, and on Sundays there is an extra service to Norwich.

Bottesford is the least used station in the county of Leicestershire and is one stop down the line from Nottinghamshire's least used station, Elton and Orston.

Preceding station	National Rail	Following station
Elton and Orston	East Midlands Railway Nottingham–Grantham line	Grantham

== Former services ==
The Great Northern and London and North Western Joint Railway opened in 1879, providing a Leicester to Grantham service from 1882 to 1953.

Former Services

Preceding station	Disused railways	Following station
Elton	Great Northern Railway; Nottingham to Grantham	Sedgebrook
Bottesford South	Great Northern Railway; Leicester Belgrave Road to Grantham	Sedgebrook
Terminus	Great Northern Railway; Denton branch (goods)	Denton
