= Grantham railway station =

Railway station in Lincolnshire, England

Grantham
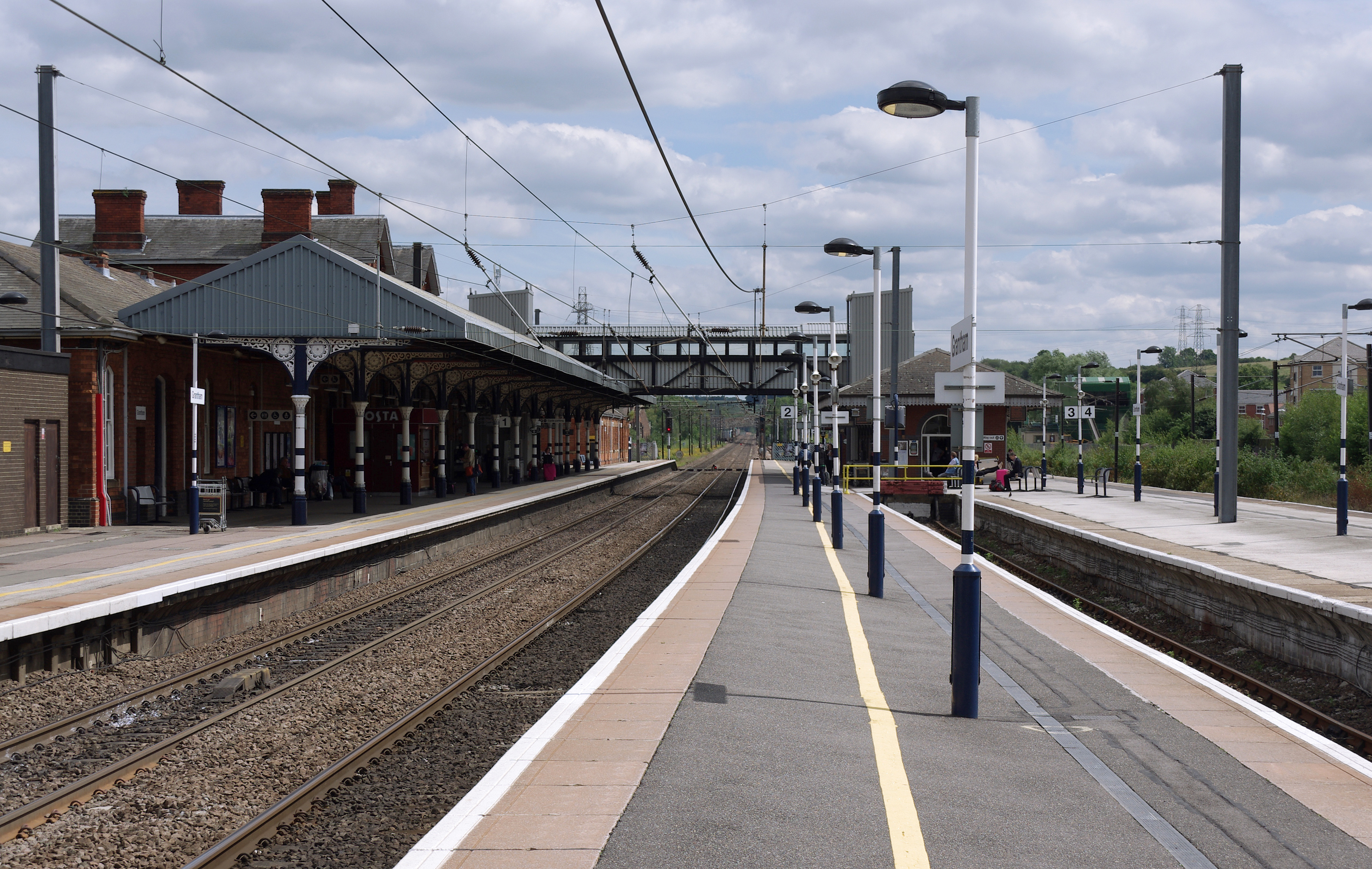
- Southbound view of the station from platform 2 (July 2012)

General information
- Location: Grantham, District of South Kesteven, England
- Coordinates: 52.906°N 0.642°W
- Grid reference: SK914351
- Manager: London North Eastern Railway
- Platforms: 4

Other information
- Station code: GRA
- Classification: DfT category C1

History
- Opened: 1852

Key dates
- 1906: Grantham rail accident
- 1988: Main line electrification
- 2006: Allington Chord opened

Passengers
- 2020/21: ▼0.348 million
- Interchange: ▼46,645
- 2021/22: ▲1.192 million
- Interchange: ▲0.172 million
- 2022/23: ▲1.260 million
- Interchange: ▲0.229 million
- 2023/24: ▲1.278 million
- Interchange: ▲0.265 million
- 2024/25: ▲1.484 million
- Interchange: ▲0.305 million
Location
Notes
- Passenger statistics from the Office of Rail and Road

Grantham railway station is a stop on the East Coast Main Line, serving the market town of Grantham, in Lincolnshire, England. It lies 105 miles 38 chains (169.7 km) down the line from London King's Cross; on the main line, it is situated between Peterborough to the south and Newark Northgate to the north. Two secondary lines diverge from the main line north of Grantham: the Poacher Line to Skegness and a branch line to Nottingham.

== History ==
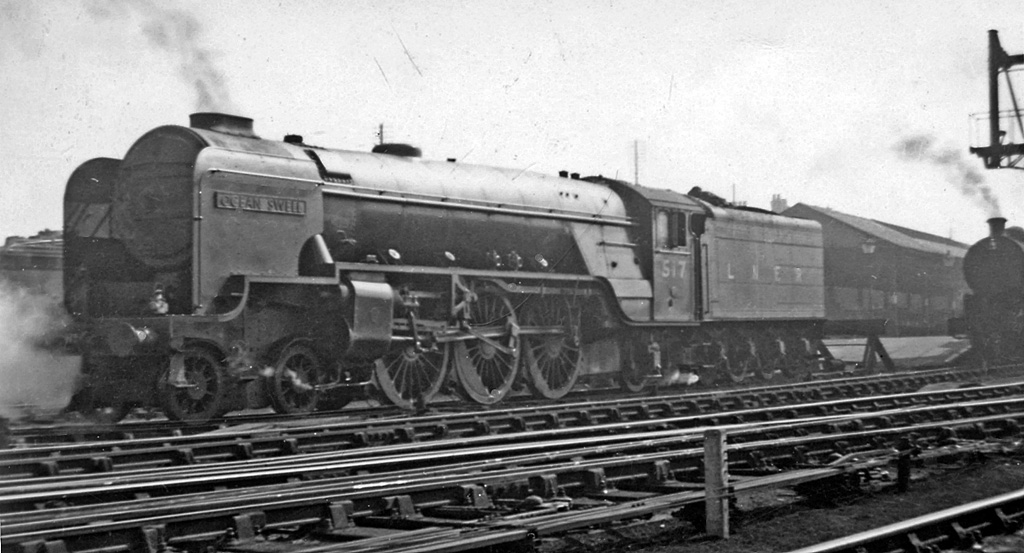
Thompson Class A2 on Grantham Shed, on a spring day in 1947

The original station at Grantham, Old Wharf, was opened when the Ambergate, Nottingham, Boston and Eastern Junction Railway opened its line from Nottingham on 15 July 1850. This line was taken over by the Great Northern Railway (GNR) in 1854. This was replaced by the present station which opened on 1 August 1852; the Old Wharf station closed the following day.

The new station was on the GNR's direct line between Peterborough and Retford (the Towns Line), which was completed in 1852. The alternative route via Boston and Lincoln (the Fens Loop Line) had already opened in 1850. The Boston, Sleaford and Midland Counties Railway opened their line from Barkston Junction, 2 miles (3.2 km) north of Grantham, to Sleaford in 1857 and on to Boston in 1859. This railway was taken over by the GNR in 1864. The Grantham to Lincoln line, which branched off the Sleaford line at Honington, was opened in 1867. Finally, the Great Northern and London and North Western Joint Railway was opened in 1879. This ran from Market Harborough and Leicester Belgrave Road in the south, through Melton Mowbray to Nottingham and Newark in the north, crossing the Grantham to Nottingham line near Bottesford. The GNR operated a Grantham to Leicester service via this route.

In 1937, the LNER announced that they planned to lengthen the down platform. At 800 feet (240 m) long, it was too short to accommodate the increasing length of the main line express trains and the work would extend it to 950 feet (290 m). At the same time, the whole platform length was to be raised to a standard height of 3 feet (0.91 m) and a new awning over the platform opposite the station buildings would be added.

A first class lounge was opened by Virgin Trains East Coast in March 2017.

| Preceding station | Historical railways | Following station |
|---|---|---|
| Great Ponton; Line open, station closed | Great Northern Railway; East Coast Main Line | Barkston; Line open, station closed |
| Terminus | Great Northern Railway; Grantham to Boston | Barkston; Line open, station closed |
| Terminus | Great Northern Railway; Grantham to Lincoln | Barkston; Line open, station closed |
| Terminus | Great Northern Railway; Grantham to Nottingham | Sedgebrook; Line open, station closed |
| Terminus | Great Northern Railway; Grantham to Leicester Belgrave Road | Sedgebrook; Line open, station closed |

=== Accidents and incidents ===
Two train crashes have occurred at Grantham:

- 7 July 1898: The 9.25pm up express from Manchester collided with a goods engine which was crossing from the up sidings to the down main line. Six passengers, the guard and both drivers were slightly injured.
- 19 September 1906: the Grantham rail crash, where a sleeper train was derailed after overrunning signals and passing through the station at excessive speed. Fourteen people were killed and seventeen were injured.

The early life of the station was marred by some unfortunate accidents to individuals:

- On 25 July 1868, William Collins, a GNR cleaner, was run over by a guard's van and killed.
- On 4 November 1868, John Boswell, aged 80, was walking along the line near the station when he was killed by a down train.
- On 23 May 1873, Thomas Robinson, a GNR engine driver, was struck fatally by a ballast-engine whilst crossing the yard at the station.
- On 12 March 1887, Eli Addlesee, a driver, was killed by some wagons being shunted in the station.
- On 27 November 1898, John William Frisby, a GNR shunter, was killed whilst crossing the line near to the station.

== Layout ==
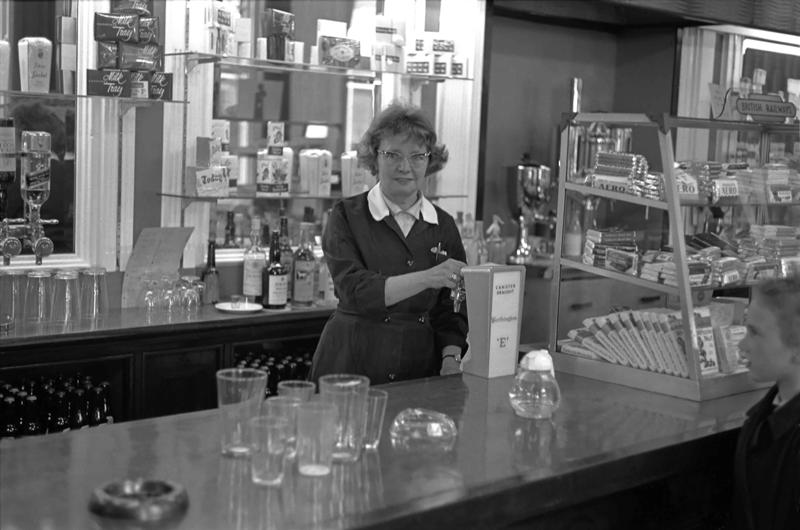
The station buffet in 1968

Junctions near the town also connect to branches to Nottingham, and to Sleaford and Skegness. The station was built close to the factory of Richard Hornsby & Sons.

The station has four platforms:

- 1 is on the East Coast Main Line (ECML) for express services to London King's Cross, via Peterborough and Stevenage.
- 2 serves Leeds, York, Newcastle and Edinburgh Waverley on the ECML.
- 3 is a bay platform at the northern end of the station that is used to allow local trains to reverse.
- 4 is a two-way platform that is used by East Midlands Railway services.

Platforms 2, 3 and 4 are formed from a large island platform structure. Only platform 1 has amenities, including toilets and a buffet.

Prior to the reopening of the Allington Chord in 2006, trains between Nottingham and Skegness entered the station on the ECML, reversed and then crossed the ECML via a flat junction, adding to congestion on the main line. Since the opening of the chord, they reverse and travel whence they came using the chord, crossing under the ECML using existing tracks.

== Services ==
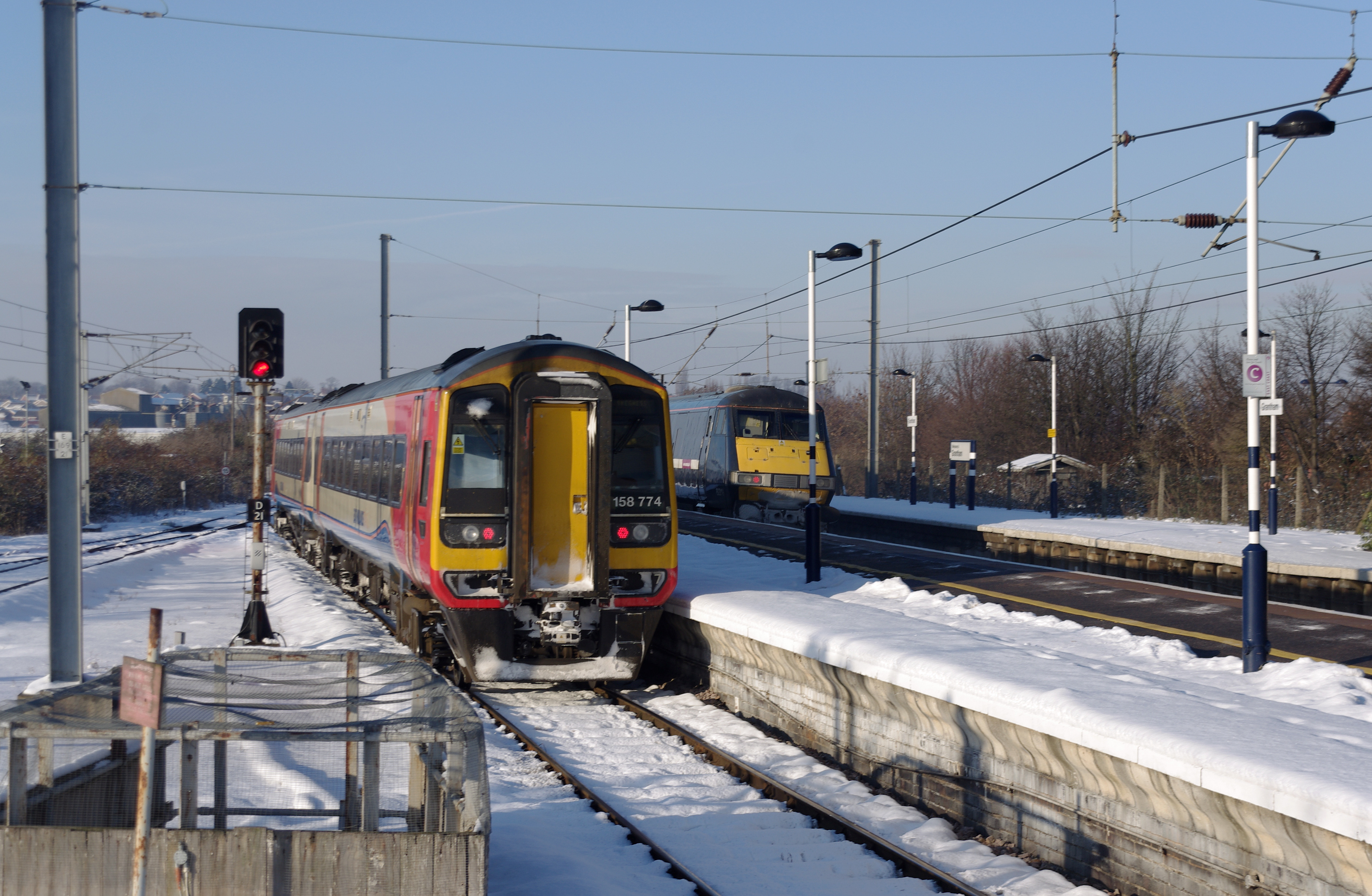
Trains at Grantham in the snow

The station is served by three train operating companies, which provide the following services in trains per hour (tph):

London North Eastern Railway:

- 5 tp2h to London Kings Cross
- 1 tph to Leeds
- 1 tph to Newcastle
- 1 tp2h to Lincoln.

Hull Trains:

- 1 tp2h to London Kings Cross
- 1 tp2h to Hull Paragon.

East Midlands Railway:

- 1 tph to Liverpool Lime Street, via Sheffield and Manchester Piccadilly
- 1 tph to Norwich, via Ely
- 1 tph to Nottingham
- 1 tph to Skegness, via Sleaford.

| Preceding station | National Rail | Following station |
|---|---|---|
| Peterborough or Stevenage | London North Eastern Railway; London-Leeds | Newark Northgate or Doncaster |
| Peterborough | London North Eastern Railway; London-Hull | Newark Northgate or Doncaster |
| Peterborough | London North Eastern Railway; London-Lincoln/Newark/Doncaster/ York/Newcastle/Edinburgh | Newark Northgate |
| Nottingham | East Midlands Railway Nottingham–Grantham line and East Coast Main Line (part) | Peterborough |
| Bottesford | East Midlands Railway Nottingham–Grantham line Poacher Line | Sleaford |
| Bottesford | East Midlands Railway Nottingham–Grantham line Poacher Line | Ancaster Limited Service |
| London King's Cross | Hull Trains; London-Hull/Beverley | Retford |
| Stevenage | Hull Trains; London-Hull/Beverley | Retford |
