= Gedling Borough Council elections =

Local government elections in Nottinghamshire, England

Gedling Borough Council elections are held every four years. Gedling Borough Council is the local authority for the non-metropolitan district of Gedling in Nottinghamshire, England. Since the last boundary changes in 2015, 41 councillors have been elected from 19 wards.

== Council elections ==
- 1973 Gedling Borough Council election
- 1976 Gedling Borough Council election (New ward boundaries)
- 1979 Gedling Borough Council election
- 1983 Gedling Borough Council election
- 1987 Gedling Borough Council election (Some new ward boundaries & borough boundary changes also took place)
- 1991 Gedling Borough Council election (Borough boundary changes took place but the number of seats remained the same)
- 1995 Gedling Borough Council election
- 1999 Gedling Borough Council election
- 2003 Gedling Borough Council election (New ward boundaries reduced the number of seats by 7)
- 2007 Gedling Borough Council election
- 2011 Gedling Borough Council election
- 2015 Gedling Borough Council election (New ward boundaries reduced the number of seats from 50 to 41)
- 2019 Gedling Borough Council election
- 2023 Gedling Borough Council election

== Borough result maps ==
2003 results map

2007 results map

2011 results map

2015 results map

2019 results map

2023 results map

== By-elections ==
=== 1995-1999 ===
Woodthorpe By-Election 17 October 1996
Party	Candidate	Votes	%	±%
Conservative		1,146	58.1	
Labour		656	33.3	
Liberal Democrats		169	8.6	
Majority		490	24.9	
Turnout		1,971	41.2	
Conservative hold		Swing		

=== 2011-2015 ===
Phoenix By-Election 15 September 2011
Party	Candidate	Votes	%	±%
Liberal Democrats	Andrew Ellwood	566	49.0	+1.2
Labour	Allan Leadbeater	445	38.5	−13.7
Conservative	James Faulconbridge	98	8.5	N/A
UKIP	Lee Waters	46	4.0	N/A
Majority		121	10.5	
Turnout		1,155	30.8	
Liberal Democrats gain from Labour		Swing		

Kingswell By-Election 2nd May 2013
Party	Candidate	Votes	%	±%
Labour	David Ellis	547	36.3	−1.2
Conservative	Michael Adams	483	32.0	−8.6
UKIP	Lee Waters	397	26.3	+26.3
Liberal Democrats	Rhiann Stansfield-Coyne	80	5.3	−1.6
Majority		64	4.3	
Turnout		1,507	39.5	
Labour hold		Swing		

Gedling By-Election 27 March 2014
Party	Candidate	Votes	%	±%
Labour	Lynda Pearson	482	32.6	
Liberal Democrats	Margaret Susan Dunkin	428	28.9	
UKIP	Claude-Francois Loi	337	22.8	
Conservative	James Faulconbridge	233	15.7	
Majority		54	3.6	
Turnout		1,488	39.5	
Labour gain from Liberal Democrats		Swing		

=== 2019-2023 ===
Cavendish By-Election 6 January 2022
Party	Candidate	Votes	%	±%
Liberal Democrats	Andrew Dunkin	344	35.1	+15.4
Labour	John Butterworth	303	30.9	−24.6
Conservative	Darren Maltby	250	25.5	+0.8
Independent	Fran Loi	56	5.7	+5.7
Green	Joe Norris	26	2.7	+2.7
Majority		41	4.2	
Turnout		979	23.2	
Liberal Democrats gain from Labour		Swing		

Gedling By-Election 26 May 2022
Party	Candidate	Votes	%	±%
Labour	Lynda Pearson	693	39.4	−14.4
Conservative	Charlie Godwin	544	30.9	+4.7
Liberal Democrats	Maggie Dunkin	428	24.3	+4.4
Green	Paul Sergent	95	5.4	+5.4
Majority		149	8.5	
Turnout		1,760		
Labour hold		Swing		

=== 2023-2027 ===
Bestwood St Albans By-Election 16 September 2024
Party	Candidate	Votes	%	±%
Conservative	Darren Maltby	358	47.8	
Labour	John Taylor	300	40.1	
Liberal Democrats	Patrick Shannon	91	12.1	
Majority		58	7.7	
Turnout		749		
Conservative gain from Labour		Swing		

Porchester By-Election 1 May 2025
Party	Candidate	Votes	%	±%
Labour	Pauline Allan	1,066	43.9	
Reform UK	John Semens	621	25.6	
Conservative	Mark Dillon	363	14.9	
Green	Richard Sutton	244	10.0	
Liberal Democrats	Robert Swift	136	5.6	
Majority		445	18.3	
Turnout		2,430		
Labour hold		Swing		

Calverton By-Election 3 July 2025
Party	Candidate	Votes	%	±%
Independent	Andy Meads	1,245	66.3	
Reform UK	Keith Walters	337	17.9	
Labour	Aimee Kimpton	150	8.0	
Conservative	Izzy Corbally	117	6.2	
Green	Oscar Power	21	1.1	
Liberal Democrats	Andrew Davies	8	0.4	
Majority		908	48.3	
Turnout		1,878		
Independent gain from Conservative		Swing		
