= 2027 Gedling Borough Council election =

Local election in England

- 6 May 2026

All 41 seats to Gedling Borough Council 21 seats needed for a majority

| | First party | Second party | Third party |
|---|---|---|---|
| Leader | John Clarke | Michael Adams | Paul Hughes |
| Party | Labour | Conservative | Liberal Democrats |
| Leader's seat | Netherfield | Trent Valley | Cavendish |
| Last election | 28 | 9 | 4 |
| Seats before | 24 | 9 | 4 |
| Swing | | | Party 4. Independent Group. Leader- Andy Meads. Last Election 0 Seats Before 4 Party 5. Reform UK Leader Sam Boultby Last Election 0 Seats Before 0 Party 6. Green Party. Leader Jim Stuart. Last Election 0 Seats Before 0 |
Leader before election
John Clarke
Labour
Leader after election
TBD

The 2027 Gedling Borough Council election will take place on 6 May 2027, to elect all 41 members of Gedling Borough Council in England. This will be on the same day as other local elections held across the United Kingdom.

== Background ==
Gedling is one of the seven non-metropolitan districts that make up Nottinghamshire County Council. From its creation in 1973 to 2011 the borough elected Conservative majorities aside from 1995 and 2003. More recently, Gedling has trended towards Labour, with the party forming administrations since 2011. At the 2023 election Labour won 28 seats, the Conservatives won 9, and the Liberal Democrats won 4.

=== Local government reorganisation ===
Gedling is one of the boroughs planned to be abolished as part of upcoming structural changes to local government in England. The northern part of the borough is expected to form part of the Nottinghamshire unitary authority, with the southern part forming part of the Greater Nottingham unitary authority.

Initial plans for the reorganisation scheduled elections for the unitary authorities in May 2027 which entailed Gedling's election being cancelled. Following the receipt of legal advice the Ministry of Housing, Communities and Local Government confirmed that the 2027 elections would take place on current local government boundaries.

== Previous council composition ==
| After 2023 election | | Before 2027 election | |
| Party | Seats | Party | Seats |
|---|---|---|---|
| Labour | 28 | Labour | 24 |
| Conservative | 9 | Conservative | 9 |
| Liberal Democrats | 4 | Liberal Democrats | 4 |
| Independent | 0 | Independent | 4 |

Changes 2023 — 2027:

- October 2023: Russell Whiting (Labour) leaves party to sit as an independent
- November 2023: Des Gibbons (Labour) leaves party to sit as an independent
- August 2024: Des Gibbons (Independent) resigns — by-election held September 2024
- September 2024: Darren Maltby (Conservative) gains by-election from Labour
- March 2025: Michelle Welsh (Labour) resigns — by-election held May 2025
- April 2025: Lorraine Brown (Conservative) dies — by-election held July 2025
- May 2025: Pauline Allan (Labour) wins by-election
- July 2025: Andy Meads (Independent) gains by-election from Conservatives
- October 2025: Roxanne Ellis (Labour) leaves party to sit as an independent
- May 2026: David Ellis (Labour) leaves party to sit as an independent
