= 2023 Gedling Borough Council election =

2023 English local election

- 4 May 2023

All 41 seats to Gedling Borough Council 21 seats needed for a majority

	First party	Second party
Leader	John Clarke	Michael Adams
Party	Labour	Conservative
Last election	29	8
Seats before	28	8 (Note: Including one vacant seat previously held by Conservative councillor Simon Murray prior to his resignation in November 2022.)
Seats after	28	9
Seat change	▼1	▲1
	Third party	Fourth party
Leader	Andrew Ellwood	Pat Bosworth
Party	Liberal Democrats	Independent
Last election	2	2
Seats before	3	2
Seats after	4	0
Seat change	▲2	▼2
- Map of the results
Leader before election
John Clarke
Labour
Leader after election
John Clarke
Labour

An election was held on 4 May 2023, to elect all 41 members of Gedling Borough Council in England. This took place as part of the 2023 United Kingdom local elections.

The council was under Labour majority control prior to the election. This election saw the Conservatives and the Liberal Democrats making some gains, but Labour retained its majority with 28 of the 41 seats on the council.

== Background ==
Gedling is one of the seven non-metropolitan districts that make up Nottinghamshire County Council. The Conservatives controlled Gedling from its creation in 1973 until Labour took control in 1995. The Conservatives won control in 1999 and 2007, with a period of no overall control in 2003. Labour regained the council in 2011, and retained control in subsequent elections. In the 2019 election, Labour won 29 seats with 47.8% of the vote, the Conservatives won 8 with 32.0%, the Liberal Democrats won 2 with 12.0%, and independents won 2 with 4.5%.

== Previous council composition ==
After 2019 election		Before 2023 election	
Party	Seats	Party	Seats
Labour	29	Labour	28
Conservative	8	Conservative	7
Liberal Democrats	2	Liberal Democrats	3
Independent	2	Independent	2

=== Changes ===
- November 2021: Gary Gregory (Labour) resigns; by-election held January 2022
- January 2022: Andrew Dunkin (Liberal Democrats) wins by-election
- March 2022: Jennifer Hemingway (Labour) resigns; by-election held May 2022
- May 2022: Lynda Pearson (Labour) wins by-election
- November 2022: Simon Murray, Baron Murray of Blidworth (Conservative) resigns; seat left vacant until 2023 election

== Results summary ==
The overall results were:

2023 Gedling Borough Council election
Party	Candidates	Seats	Gains	Losses	Net gain/loss	Seats %	Votes %	Votes	+/−
Labour	41	28	1	1	0	68	52		
Conservative	41	9	3	1	2	22	34		
Liberal Democrats	34	4	1	0	1	10	10		
Green	9	0	0	0	0	0	2		
Independent	8	0	0	-2	-2	0	3		

== Ward results ==
An asterisk denotes an incumbent councillor. The results were:

=== Bestwood St Albans ===
Bestwood St Albans (2 seats)
Party	Candidate	Votes	%	±%
Labour	Rachael Ellis*	586	54.5	
Labour	Des Gibbons*	576	53.6	
Conservative	Josie Abbott	352	32.7	
Conservative	Katherine Randall	327	30.4	
Green	Margret Vince	115	10.7	
Liberal Democrats	Ray Poynter	66	6.1	
Liberal Democrats	Patrick Shannon	64	6.0	
Turnout		1,080	26.3	
Labour hold				
Labour hold				

=== Calverton ===
Calverton (3 seats)
Party	Candidate	Votes	%	±%
Conservative	Boyd Elliott*	1,075	53.2	
Conservative	Lorraine Brown	750	37.1	
Conservative	Jane Walker	711	35.2	
Labour	Dean Wilson	611	30.2	
Labour	Sarah Smith	458	22.7	
Independent	Mike Hope*	450	22.3	
Labour	Darcy Inchboard	408	20.2	
Independent	Pat Bosworth*	377	18.7	
No description	John Bailey	352	17.4	
Independent	Sam Gordon	313	15.5	
Turnout		2,050	34.5	
Conservative gain from Independent				
Conservative hold				
Conservative gain from Independent				

=== Carlton ===
Carlton (2 seats)
Party	Candidate	Votes	%	±%
Labour	Catherine Pope	845	56.1	
Labour	Paul Wilkinson*	816	54.2	
Conservative	Kai Harrison	527	35.0	
Conservative	Annabelle Banner	508	33.8	
Green	Ruth Tanner	120	8.0	
Liberal Democrats	Graham Dewberry	65	4.3	
Liberal Democrats	Johnathan Ho	60	4.0	
Turnout		1,509	36.0	
Labour hold				
Labour hold				

=== Carlton Hill ===
Carlton Hill (3 seats)
Party	Candidate	Votes	%	±%
Labour	Paul Feeney*	1,120	62.8	
Labour	Jim Creamer*	1,118	62.7	
Labour	Alex Scroggie*	1,016	57.0	
Conservative	Yvonne Godwin	499	28.0	
Conservative	James Greensmith	457	25.6	
Conservative	Steve Swann	450	25.2	
Liberal Democrats	Joseph Conboy	183	10.3	
Liberal Democrats	Anthony Gillam	147	8.2	
Liberal Democrats	Nadia Hajat	140	7.8	
Turnout		1,802	28.8	
Labour hold				
Labour hold				
Labour hold				

=== Cavendish ===
Cavendish (2 seats)
Party	Candidate	Votes	%	±%
Liberal Democrats	Andrew Dunkin*	605	46.3	
Liberal Democrats	Paul Hughes	562	43.0	
Labour	Liz Clunie*	536	41.0	
Labour	Dwayne Henry	518	39.7	
Conservative	Pat Blandamer	137	10.5	
Conservative	Collette Osborne	135	10.3	
Independent	Gary Gregory	40	3.1	
Independent	Karen Gregory	32	2.5	
Turnout		1,312	31.3	
Liberal Democrats gain from Labour				
Liberal Democrats gain from Labour				

=== Colwick ===
Colwick (1 seat)
Party	Candidate	Votes	%	±%
Labour	Russell Whiting	425	61.2	
Conservative	Kevin Doyle	238	34.3	
Liberal Democrats	Paul Milburn	31	4.5	
Turnout		700	33.6	
Labour hold				

=== Coppice ===
Coppice (2 seats)
Party	Candidate	Votes	%	±%
Labour	Marje Paling*	991	63.9	
Labour	Henry Wheeler*	979	63.2	
Conservative	Mick Abbott	437	28.2	
Conservative	Geoff Walker	407	26.3	
Green	Jim Stuart	129	8.3	
Liberal Democrats	Mark Simons	75	4.8	
Turnout		1,561	34.4	
Labour hold				
Labour hold				

=== Daybrook ===
Daybrook (2 seats)
Party	Candidate	Votes	%	±%
Labour	Sandra Barnes*	923	79.2	
Labour	Kyle Robinson-Payne	896	76.8	
Conservative	Chris Walker	235	20.2	
Conservative	Melissa Seaton	225	19.3	
Turnout		1,174	26.9	
Labour hold				
Labour hold				

=== Dumbles ===
Dumbles (1 seat)
Party	Candidate	Votes	%	±%
Conservative	Helen Greensmith*	555	55.1	
Labour	Daniel Taylor	275	27.3	
Green	Ian Smith	124	12.3	
Liberal Democrats	Catherine O'Riordan	53	5.3	
Turnout		1,012	43.2	
Conservative hold				

=== Ernehale ===
Ernehale (2 seats)
Party	Candidate	Votes	%	±%
Labour Co-op	David Ellis*	808	56.7	
Labour Co-op	Roxanne Ellis*	780	54.7	
Conservative	Ged Clarke	420	29.5	
Conservative	Sue Walker	356	25.0	
Independent	Paul Key	117	8.2	
Liberal Democrats	Jason Stansfield	112	7.9	
Independent	Desmond Peet	97	6.8	
Liberal Democrats	Judy Barson	90	6.3	
Turnout		1,429	31.3	
Labour hold				
Labour hold				

=== Gedling ===
Gedling (2 seats)
Party	Candidate	Votes	%	±%
Labour	Jenny Hollingsworth*	1,022	57.4	
Labour	Lynda Pearson*	913	51.2	
Conservative	Charlie Godwin	529	29.7	
Conservative	Darren Maltby	477	26.8	
Liberal Democrats	Maggie Dunkin	294	16.5	
Liberal Democrats	James O'Riordan	230	12.9	
Turnout		1,793	36.3	
Labour hold				
Labour hold				

=== Netherfield ===
Netherfield (2 seats)
Party	Candidate	Votes	%	±%
Labour	William John Clarke* (John Clarke)	766	69.4	
Labour	Alison Lesley	750	67.9	
Conservative	Mick Murphy	204	18.5	
Conservative	Michel Flor-Henry	197	17.8	
Green	Laurence Baldwin	142	12.9	
Liberal Democrats	Essop Hajat	33	3.0	
Liberal Democrats	Fran Hajat	33	3.0	
Turnout		1,116	27.7	
Labour hold				
Labour hold				

=== Newstead Abbey ===
Newstead Abbey (3 seats)
Party	Candidate	Votes	%	±%
Conservative	Martin Smith*	1,499	57.9	
Conservative	Stuart Bestwick	1,470	56.8	
Conservative	Sue Pickering	1,434	55.4	
Labour	Carol Wright	925	35.7	
Labour	Sharon Butterworth	729	28.2	
Labour	Cleon Nelson	725	28.0	
Liberal Democrats	Paul Bruch	309	11.9	
Liberal Democrats	John Sutherland	192	7.4	
Liberal Democrats	Jim Heath	182	7.0	
Turnout		2,604	37.7	
Conservative hold				
Conservative hold				
Conservative hold				

=== Phoenix ===
Phoenix (2 seats)
Party	Candidate	Votes	%	±%
Liberal Democrats	Andrew Ellwood*	766	58.0	
Liberal Democrats	Clive John Towsey-Hinton*	746	56.5	
Labour	Andrew Armstrong	413	31.3	
Labour	Richard Shipley	388	29.4	
Conservative	Alan Bexon	154	11.7	
Conservative	Tracy Maltby	148	11.2	
Turnout		1,324	33.1	
Liberal Democrats hold				
Liberal Democrats hold				

=== Plains ===
Plains (3 seats)
Party	Candidate	Votes	%	±%
Labour	Grahame Pope	1,291	51.0	
Labour	David Brocklebank	1,275	50.4	
Labour	Margaret Strong	1,241	49.1	
Conservative	Keith Seaton	1,065	42.1	
Conservative	Carol Walker	1,034	40.9	
Conservative	Ed Jayamaha	988	39.1	
Liberal Democrats	Luke Dunkin	176	7.0	
Liberal Democrats	Max Beeken	171	6.8	
Liberal Democrats	Martin Gladwell	160	6.3	
Turnout		2,545	37.7	
Labour hold				
Labour hold				
Labour gain from Conservative				

=== Porchester ===
Porchester (3 seats)
Party	Candidate	Votes	%	±%
Labour	Julie Najuk*	1,661	64.5	
Labour	Michelle Welsh	1,607	62.4	
Labour	Roy Allan	1,587	61.6	
Conservative	Linda Adams	619	24.0	
Conservative	Alison Smith	596	23.1	
Conservative	Tony Jenkins	581	22.6	
Green	Dennis Penaluna	334	13.0	
Liberal Democrats	Alan Dawson	209	8.1	
Liberal Democrats	Hannah Soar	180	7.0	
Liberal Democrats	Robert Swift	139	5.4	
Turnout		2,589	40.7	
Labour hold				
Labour hold				
Labour hold				

=== Redhill ===
Redhill (2 seats)
Party	Candidate	Votes	%	±%
Labour	Michael Payne*	1,291	73.9	
Labour	Kathryn Fox*	1,169	66.9	
Conservative	Kevin Lock	377	21.6	
Conservative	Gerry Kenwood	367	21.0	
Liberal Democrats	Tad Jones	127	7.3	
Liberal Democrats	David Snodgrass	53	3.0	
Turnout		1,761	36.6	
Labour hold				
Labour hold				

=== Trent Valley ===
Trent Valley (2 seats)
Party	Candidate	Votes	%	±%
Conservative	Mike Adams*	1,110	52.8	
Conservative	Sam Smith*	1,032	49.1	
Labour	Richard Fletcher	849	40.4	
Labour	Muhammad Malik	803	38.2	
Liberal Democrats	Richard Fife	165	7.8	
Liberal Democrats	John Flynn	161	7.7	
Turnout		2,112	44.8	
Conservative hold				
Conservative hold				

=== Woodthorpe ===
Woodthorpe (2 seats)
Party	Candidate	Votes	%	±%
Labour	Viv McCrossen*	1,281	64.8	
Labour	Ron McCrossen*	1,209	61.2	
Conservative	Myles Pike	490	24.8	
Conservative	Suzanna Adams	479	24.2	
Green	Steven Clarke	182	9.2	
Liberal Democrats	Roger Patterson	144	7.3	
Liberal Democrats	Andrew Swift	100	5.1	
Turnout		1,982	45.5	
Labour hold				
Labour hold				

== Changes 2023–2027 ==
In October and November 2023, Russell Whiting and Des Gibbons left the Labour Party to sit as independents.

David and Roxanne Ellis were suspended by the Labour Party and subsequently sat as independents.

The Conservatives gained Bestwood St Albans from an independent at the September 2024 by-election, Labour held Porchester in May 2025, and independent Andy Meads gained Calverton from the Conservatives in July 2025.

=== By-elections ===
==== Bestwood St Albans ====
The Bestwood St Albans by-election was triggered by the resignation on health grounds of independent councillor Des Gibbons, who had been elected for Labour in 2023 before leaving the party in November that year.

Bestwood St Albans by-election: 16 September 2024
Party	Candidate	Votes	%	±%
Conservative	Darren Maltby	358	47.8	+15.1
Labour	Stephen Taylor	300	40.1	–14.4
Liberal Democrats	Patrick Shannon	91	12.1	+6.0
Majority		58	7.7	
Turnout		755	18.03	
Conservative gain from Independent				

==== Porchester ====
The Porchester by-election was triggered by the resignation of Labour councillor Michelle Welsh.

Porchester by-election: 1 May 2025
Party	Candidate	Votes	%	±%
Labour	Pauline Allan	1,066	43.9	–14.9
Reform	John Semens	621	25.6	N/A
Conservative	Mark Dillon	363	14.9	–7.0
Green	Richard Sutton	244	10.0	–1.8
Liberal Democrats	Robert Swift	136	5.6	–1.8
Majority		445	18.3	
Turnout		2,438	37.73	
Labour hold				

==== Calverton ====
The Calverton by-election was triggered by the death of Conservative councillor Lorraine Brown.

Calverton by-election: 3 July 2025
Party	Candidate	Votes	%	±%
Independent	Andy Meads	1,245	66.3	N/A
Reform	Keith Walters	337	17.9	N/A
Labour	Aimee Kimpton	150	8.0	–16.6
Conservative	Izzy Corbally	117	6.2	–37.0
Green	Oscar Power	21	1.1	N/A
Liberal Democrats	Andrew Davies	8	0.4	N/A
Majority		908	48.4	N/A
Turnout		1,882	29.61	
Independent gain from Conservative				

Independent candidate Andy Meads won 66.3% of the valid votes, finishing 48.4 percentage points ahead of the second-placed Reform UK candidate.
