= 2014 Newark by-election =

UK parliamentary by-election

- 5 June 2014

Newark constituency
- Registered: 73,478
- Turnout: 52.79%
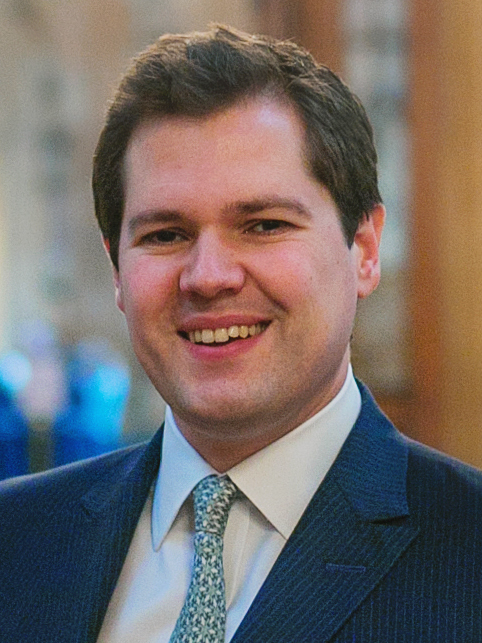

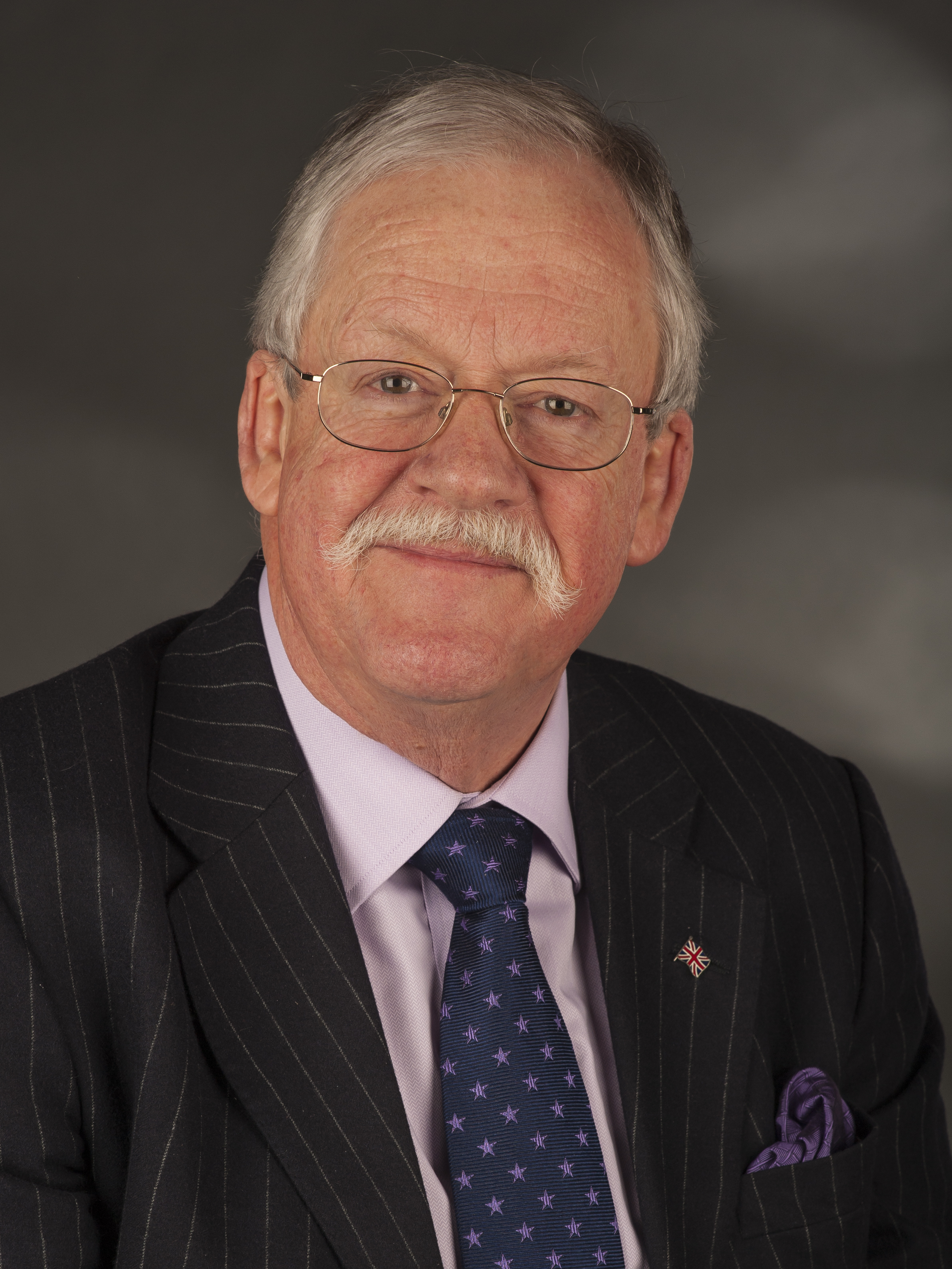

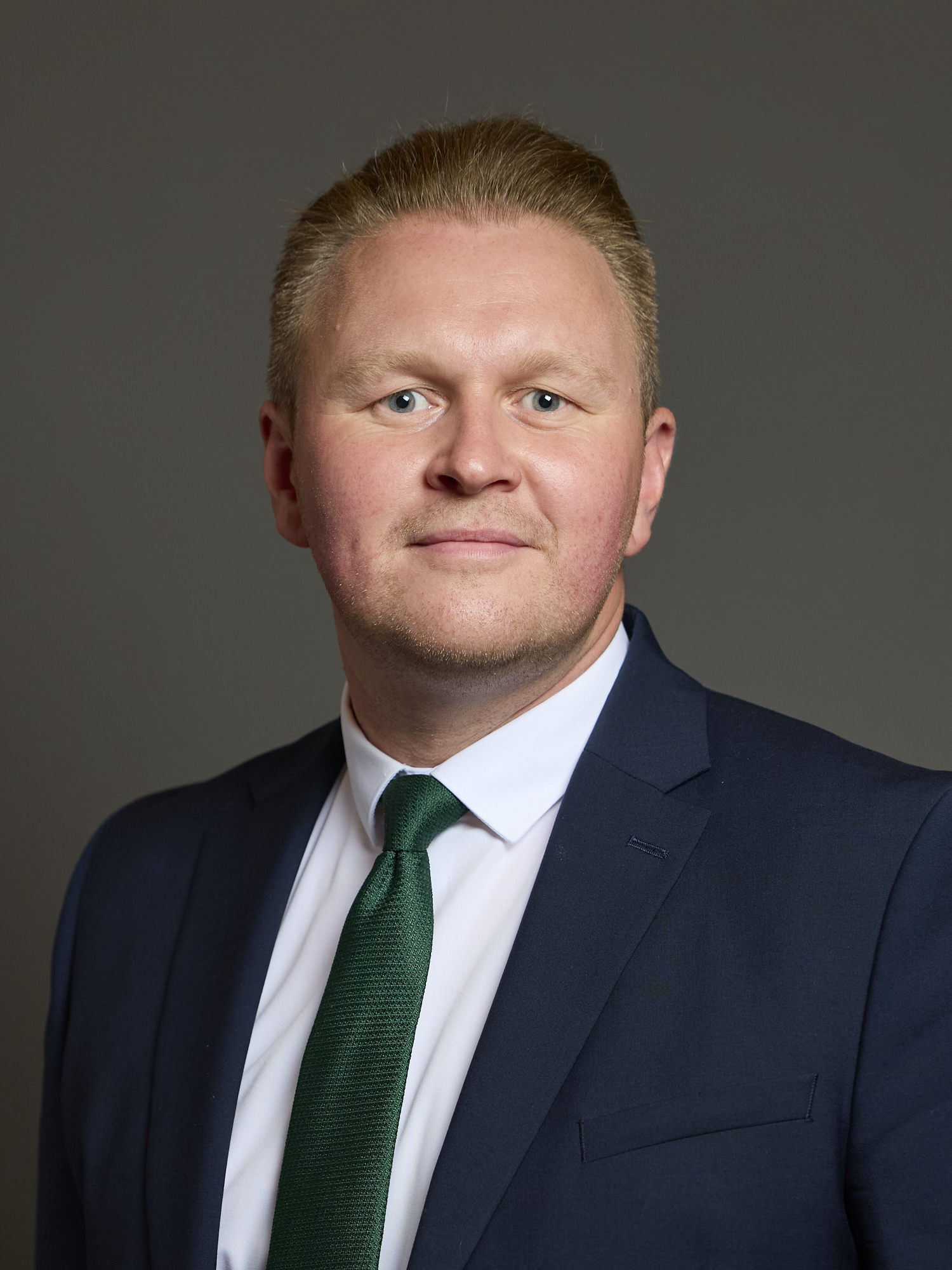
	First party	Second party	Third party
Candidate	Robert Jenrick	Roger Helmer	Michael Payne
Party	Conservative	UKIP	Labour
Popular vote	17,431	10,028	6,842
Percentage	45.0%	25.9%	17.7%
Swing	▼8.9 pp	▲22.1 pp	▼4.7 pp
MP before election
Patrick Mercer
Conservative
Subsequent MP
Robert Jenrick
Conservative

A by-election for the United Kingdom parliamentary constituency of Newark was held on 5 June 2014, following the resignation of incumbent Conservative Party MP Patrick Mercer after he was found breaching parliamentary lobbying rules. It was won by Conservative candidate Robert Jenrick, who held the seat albeit with a decreased majority.

== Background ==
Mercer resigned the Conservative Party whip on 31 May 2013 after an investigation by the BBC's Panorama programme regarding allegations of paid lobbying without registering the interest. He was paid £4,000 for asking questions in Parliament, and the Panorama team considered that he asked five parliamentary questions, but declared only £2,000 of the £4,000. As a consequence, he said at the time that he would not stand in the 2015 general election.

On 29 April, after being told that the Committee on Standards would recommend that he be suspended from the House of Commons for six months, Mercer announced that he would resign his seat: he told journalists on College Green that he was standing down from "God's county of Nottinghamshire". Mercer was appointed Steward and Bailiff of the Three Chiltern Hundreds on 30 April 2014, a mechanism by which MPs resign.

The writ for the by-election to be held was moved on 1 May 2014, and polling day was called for 5 June.

== Candidates ==
The nominations closed at 4pm on Tuesday 13 May with 11 candidates being nominated.

The local Conservative Party had already selected Robert Jenrick to fight the seat. Jenrick trained as a solicitor and was a director of Christie's auction house. He is married with two children.

Labour selected councillor Michael Payne, a former students' union president and deputy leader of Gedling Borough Council.

The Liberal Democrats chose David Watts, leader of Broxtowe Borough Council.

Nigel Farage was immediately interviewed on the evening of 29 April and said he was "tempted" to stand, but the next morning he ruled himself out. UKIP instead announced that outspoken former Conservative and current UKIP MEP for the East Midlands Roger Helmer would stand in the by-election.

The Bus Pass Elvis Party leader and perennial election candidate, David Bishop, announced on 6 May that he would stand in the by-election after taking fourth place ahead of the Liberal Democrats in a recent local authority by-election in Clifton North ward, Nottingham.

== Result ==
2014 Newark by-election
Party	Candidate	Votes	%	±%
Conservative	Robert Jenrick	17,431	45.0	–8.9
UKIP	Roger Helmer	10,028	25.9	+22.1
Labour	Michael Payne	6,842	17.7	–4.6
Independent	Paul Baggaley	1,891	4.9	New
Green	David Kirwan	1,057	2.7	New
Liberal Democrats	David Watts	1,004	2.6	–17.4
Monster Raving Loony	Nick The Flying Brick	168	0.4	New
Independent	Andy Hayes	117	0.3	New
Bus-Pass Elvis	David Bishop	87	0.2	New
Common Good	Dick Rodgers	64	0.2	New
Patriotic Socialist Party	Lee Woods	18	0.0	New
Majority		7,403	19.1	–12.5
Turnout		38,707	52.79	–19.61
Conservative hold		Swing	–15.5	

The Conservatives retained the seat with a majority of over 7,000 which was described by the BBC as 'a relatively comfortable victory'. While UKIP's performance decreased the Conservative majority the BBC's Alex Forsyth said this was 'not as much as Mr Farage had hoped - or predicted'. Christopher Hope, writing in The Daily Telegraph, argued that 'the scale of the victory is a vindication for the Tory high command which mounted a huge effort to win the seat' and claimed that David Cameron 'had halted the momentum of Ukip'. George Osborne hailed his party's victory and noted that it was the first time the Conservative's had held a seat at a by-election while in government for 25 years. However, both Nigel Farage and Labour's Chris Bryant suggested that the Conservative performance was not particularly impressive. It was suggested by Owen Jones in The Guardian that "Labour and Lib Dem voters clearly voted tactically to keep Ukip out". The poor performance for the Liberal Democrats was described by the BBC as one of 'worst performances in a post-war English by-election' for the party or its predecessors, and by The Telegraph as 'a disaster' for the party.

== Polling ==
Date(s) conducted	Polling organisation/client	Sample size	Con	Lab	LD	UKIP	Others	Lead
5 Jun 2014	2014 by-election	38,707	45.0%	17.7%	3%	25.9%	8%	19%
2–3 Jun	Survation	678	42%	22%	4%	27%	5%	15%
27 May–1 Jun	Lord Ashcroft	1,000	42%	20%	6%	27%	5%	15%
27–28 May	Survation/The Sun	606	36%	27%	5%	28%	5%	8%
6 May 2010	2010 Results (Newark only)	51,228	53.9%	22.3%	20.0%	3.8%	-	31.5%

== Previous result ==
General election 2010: Newark
Party	Candidate	Votes	%	±%
Conservative	Patrick Mercer	27,590	53.9	+3.4
Labour	Ian Campbell	11,438	22.3	−6.0
Liberal Democrats	Pauline Jenkins	10,246	20.0	+1.6
UKIP	Tom Irvine	1,954	3.8	+1.0
Majority		16,152	31.6	+9.4
Turnout		51,228	71.4	+8.0
Conservative hold		Swing	+4.7	

== See also ==
- 1943 Newark by-election
- 2014 United Kingdom local elections
- 2014 European Parliament election in the United Kingdom
- List of United Kingdom by-elections
