= Simon Murray, Baron Murray of Blidworth =

British barrister (born 1974)

The Right Honourable The Lord Murray of Blidworth EsqStJ
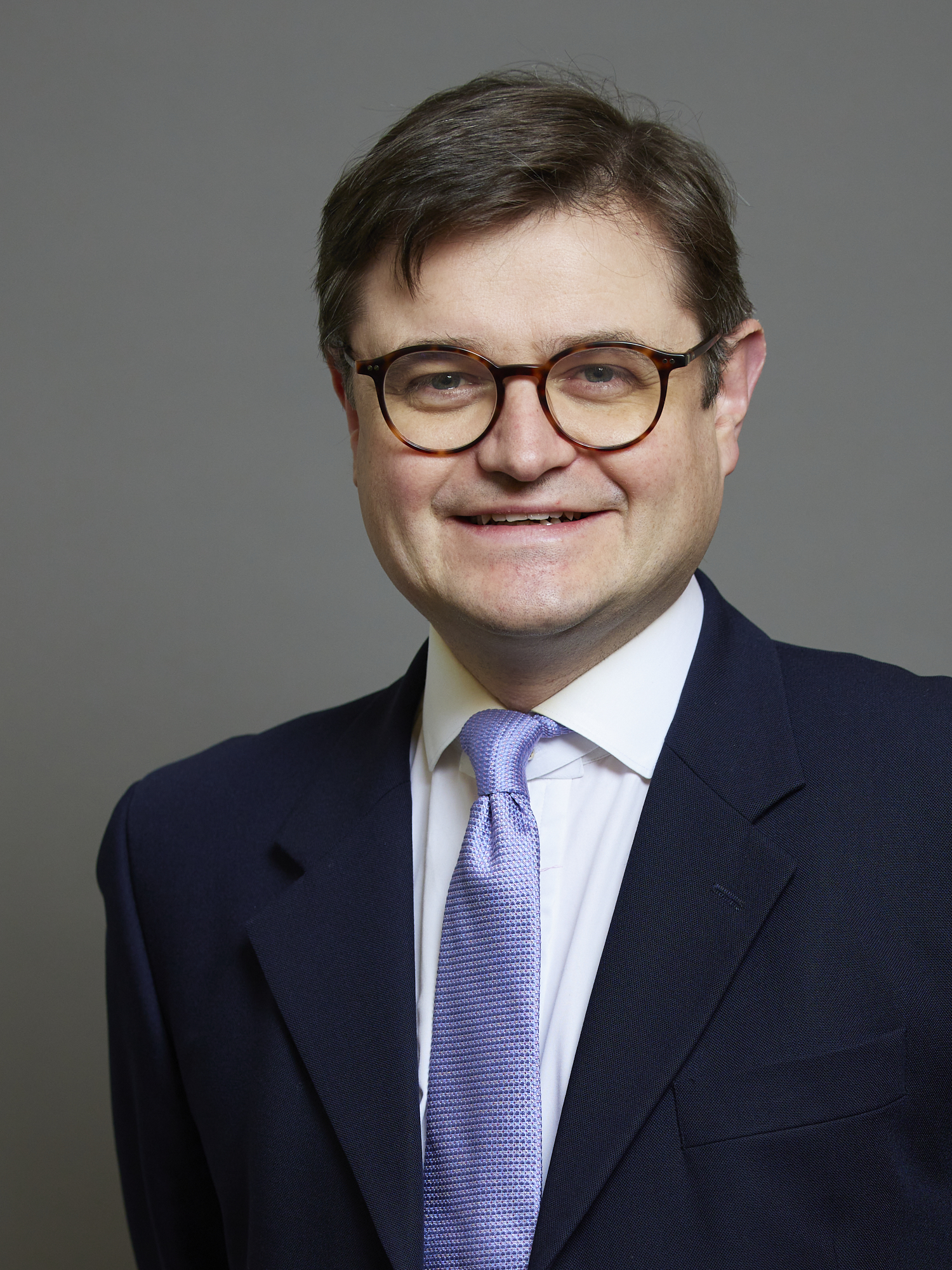
- Lord Murray of Blidworth, 2022

Shadow Minister for the Home Office
- In office 11 November 2024 – 15 January 2025
- Leader: Kemi Badenoch
- Preceded by: The Lord Sharpe of Epsom
- Succeeded by: The Lord Cameron of Lochiel (2026)

Parliamentary Under-Secretary of State for Migration and Borders (Note: Minister of State until 29 October 2022)
- In office 7 October 2022 – 14 November 2023
- Prime Minister: Liz Truss; Rishi Sunak
- Preceded by: Simon Baynes
- Succeeded by: Michael Tomlinson

Member of the House of Lords
- Lord Temporal
- Life peerage 21 October 2022

Personal details
- Born: Simon Peregrine Gauvain Murray; 2 August 1974 (age 52) London, England
- Party: Conservative
- Education: University of St Andrews

Simon Peregrine Gauvain Murray, Baron Murray of Blidworth (born 2 August 1974), is a British barrister and Conservative member of the House of Lords. He served as a minister for the Home Office (2022–2023).

== Early life and education ==
The only son of Dr Nigel Ormiston Gauvain Murray (1944–2002) and his wife Shirley née Arbuthnot (born 1949).

After graduating from the University of St Andrews with an undergraduate Master of Arts (MA Hons) in History, Murray took the Common Professional Examination at City, University of London. He was called to the Bar at the Inner Temple in 2000. Lord Murray practises public law at 39 Essex Chambers.

In 2011 he appeared on the BBC show, Fake or Fortune? for his family who claim ownership of the painting; even though the family did not remember owning the painting and presumably because they had realised its worth, Children Under a Palm by Winslow Homer, which had been found by a skip over 23 years earlier; although determined to be genuine, who owns this work of art is still a matter of dispute.

=== Political career ===
Elected to Gedling Borough Council at the 2019 local elections, Murray represented Newstead Abbey Ward as a Conservative Councillor until November 2022 after being appointed to HMG.

Appointed Minister of State for the Home Office by Prime Minister Liz Truss on 9 October 2022, he was created a Life Peer on 21 October 2022, taking the title of Baron Murray of Blidworth, of Blidworth in the County of Nottinghamshire.

Lord Murray made his maiden speech in the Upper House on 26 October 2022 during a debate on British Passports for those born the Republic of Ireland but living in Northern Ireland, and served in the Home Office as Parliamentary Under-Secretary from 30 October 2022 until 14 November 2023. He was a Shadow Minister for the Home Office under Kemi Badenoch from November 2024 to January 2025.

== Personal life ==
Murray married Amelia May Beaumont (born 1983). Lord and Lady Murray have two children.

A Freeman of the City of London and a liveryman of the Worshipful Company of Scriveners, Lord Murray is a member of MCC and since 2002 serves on the ceremonial staff as an Esquire of the Order of St John.

== See also ==
- Forms of address in the United Kingdom
- Home Office

Orders of precedence in the United Kingdom
Preceded by The Lord Johnson of Lainston	Gentlemen; Baron Murray of Blidworth	Followed by The Lord Soames of Fletching
Political offices
Preceded by The Baroness Williams of Trafford	Minister of State for Home Affairs; 2022	Vacant
Preceded by The Rt Hon. Chris Philp	Parliamentary Under-Secretary of State for the Home Office; 2022–2023	Succeeded by The Lord Sharpe of Epsom
