= Michael Payne (politician) =

British politician

Michael Payne MP
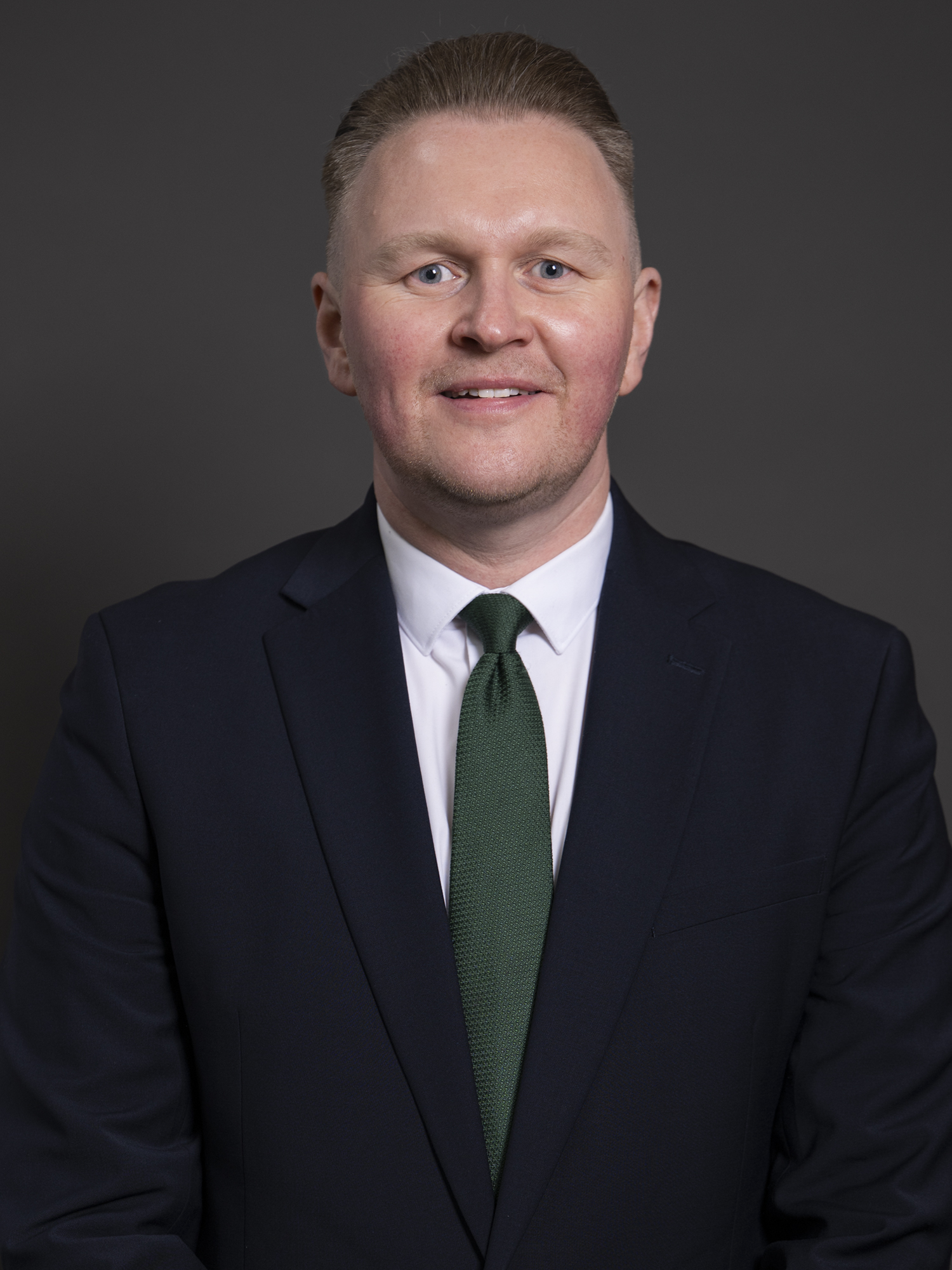
- Official portrait, 2025

Member of Parliament for Gedling
- Incumbent
- Assumed office 4 July 2024
- Preceded by: Tom Randall
- Majority: 11,881 (24.4%)

Personal details
- Born: Michael Richard Payne Arnold, Nottinghamshire, England
- Party: Labour
- Education: Lancaster University

Michael Richard Payne is a British Labour Party politician who has been the Member of Parliament for Gedling since 2024. He has been a Nottinghamshire County councillor and deputy leader of Gedling Borough Council, serving in both roles for thirteen years.

He was also chair of Nottinghamshire Fire and Rescue Service between 2019 and 2024 and served on the fire authority from 2013 to 2024.

== Biography ==
He studied at Lancaster University, where he became President of the Students' Union in 2008.

Payne unsuccessfully contested the seat of Newark at the 2014 Newark by-election and the 2015 General Election.

Payne served as the deputy leader of the Local Government Association’s (LGA) Labour Group and deputy chair of the LGA for seven years before stepping down to concentrate on running to be the MP for Gedling.

He also served as chair of the Local Government Information Unit from 2014 to 2024.

Payne is openly gay and is married to a fellow councillor. In January 2024, Pink News reported that a Conservative council candidate had been suspended after using a homophobic slur directed at Payne in a social media discussion.

On 11 May 2026, he was appointed Parliamentary Private Secretary to the Home Office.

== Elections contested ==
=== Parliamentary elections ===
Year	Constituency	Party	Votes	% votes	Position	Ref.
2014 Newark by-election	Newark	Labour	6,842	17.7	3rd of 11	
2015 general election	Newark	Labour	11,360	21.7	2nd of 6	
2024 general election	Gedling	Labour	23,278	47.8	Won	

=== Nottinghamshire County Council elections ===
Year	Ward	Party	Votes	% votes	Position	Ref.
2013	Arnold North	Labour	2,569	41.8	Elected	
2017	Arnold North	Labour	3,309	44.5	Elected	
2021	Arnold North	Labour	3,994	51.3	Won	

=== Gedling Borough Council elections ===
Year	Ward	Party	Votes	% votes	Position	Ref.
2011	St Mary's	Labour	1,136	18.8	Elected	
2015	Redhill	Labour	1,449	23.5	Won	
2019	Redhill	Labour	1,188	66.0	Won	
2023	Redhill	Labour	1,291	73.9	Won	
