= 2019 Gedling Borough Council election =

2019 UK local government election

- 2 May 2019

All 41 seats to Gedling Borough Council 21 seats needed for a majority
- Turnout: 36.1%

	First party	Second party
Party	Labour	Conservative
Last election	25 seats, 39.1%	15 seats, 36.9%
Seats won	29	8
Seat change	▲4	▼7
Popular vote	33,384	22,345
Percentage	47.8%	32.0%
Swing	▲8.7%	▼4.9%
	Third party	Fourth party
Party	Liberal Democrats	Independent
Last election	1 seat, 5.9%	0 seats, 0.5%
Seats won	2	2
Seat change	▲1	▲2
Popular vote	8,375	3,117
Percentage	12.0%	4.5%
Swing	▲6.1%	▲4.0%
- Map of the results
Council control before election
Labour
Council control after election
Labour

Elections to Gedling Borough Council in Nottinghamshire were held on 2 May 2019, the same day as the other local government elections in England and Northern Ireland. The election used the nineteen wards created as a result of boundary commission recommendations formulated for the 2015 contest, with each division electing between one and three Councillors using the first-past-the-post electoral system. A total of 41 representatives were elected.

After the 2015 election, a Labour majority administration of 25 was formed. In 2019, Labour gained four seats, increasing their numbers to 29, eight clear of the Council's majority threshold.

== Summary ==
=== Election result ===
2019 Gedling Borough Council election
Party	Candidates	Seats	Gains	Losses	Net gain/loss	Seats %	Votes %	Votes	+/−
Labour	41	29	5	1	▲4	70.7	47.8	33,384	+8.7
Conservative	41	8	0	7	▼7	19.5	32.0	22,345	–4.9
Liberal Democrats	31	2	1	0	▲1	4.9	12.0	8,375	+6.1
Independent	7	2	2	0	▲2	4.9	4.5	3,117	+4.0
UKIP	7	0	0	0	Steady	0.0	2.3	1,630	–14.0
Ind. Network	1	0	0	0	Steady	0.0	0.9	630	N/A
Green	2	0	0	0	Steady	0.0	0.5	377	–0.8

== Ward results ==
=== Bestwood St Albans ===
Bestwood St Albans (2)
Party	Candidate	Votes	%
Labour	Rachael Ellis	464	44.1
Labour	Des Gibbons	425	40.4
Conservative	Tammy Bisset	340	32.4
Conservative	Warren Bisset	311	29.6
Green	Margret Vince	185	17.6
UKIP	Anthony Hall	175	16.7
Turnout		1,051	
Rejected ballots		9	0.9
Labour hold			
Labour gain from Conservative			

=== Calverton ===
Calverton (3)
Party	Candidate	Votes	%
Independent	Mike Hope	860	37.7
Conservative	Boyd Elliott	843	36.9
Independent	Pat Bosworth	809	35.4
Independent	Sandra Harris	729	31.9
Conservative	Jane Walker	649	28.4
Conservative	Marie Knowles	612	26.8
Labour	Pamela Ede Cooper	439	19.2
Labour	Clive Foster	429	18.8
Labour	Matthew Spurr	386	16.9
UKIP	Fran Loi	333	14.6
Turnout		2,283	
Rejected ballots		17	0.7
Independent gain from Conservative			
Conservative hold			
Independent gain from Conservative			

=== Carlton ===
Carlton (2)
Party	Candidate	Votes	%
Labour	Nicki Brooks	895	60.8
Labour	Paul Wilkinson	836	56.8
Conservative	Ged Clarke	386	26.2
Conservative	Gerald Kenwood	367	24.9
Liberal Democrats	Amanda Burrows	133	9.0
Liberal Democrats	Max Beeken	124	8.4
Turnout		1,472	
Rejected ballots		51	3.5
Labour hold			
Labour hold			

=== Carlton Hill ===
Carlton Hill (3)
Party	Candidate	Votes	%
Labour	Jim Creamer	1,255	63.7
Labour	Paul Feeney	1,193	60.6
Labour	Alex Scroggie	1,158	58.8
Conservative	Patricia Blandamer	523	26.5
Conservative	James Greensmith	490	24.9
Conservative	Kevin Lock	477	24.2
Liberal Democrats	Hannah Soar	165	8.4
Liberal Democrats	Nadia Hajat	140	7.1
Liberal Democrats	Paul Milburn	138	7.0
Turnout		1,970	
Rejected ballots		67	3.4
Labour hold			
Labour hold			
Labour hold			

=== Cavendish ===
Cavendish (2)
Party	Candidate	Votes	%
Labour	Gary Gregory	704	53.7
Labour	Liz Clunie	695	53.0
Conservative	George Miller	314	23.9
Conservative	Mitchell Remzi	272	20.7
Liberal Democrats	Andrew Dunkin	250	19.1
Liberal Democrats	Paul Hughes	236	18.0
Turnout		1,312	
Rejected ballots		52	4.0
Labour hold			
Labour hold			

=== Colwick ===
Colwick (1)
Party	Candidate	Votes	%
Labour	Meredith Lawrence	422	63.2
Conservative	Michel Flor-Henry	158	23.7
UKIP	Jean Katimertzis	78	11.7
Turnout		668	
Rejected ballots		10	1.5
Labour hold			

=== Coppice ===
Coppice (2)
Party	Candidate	Votes	%
Labour	Marje Paling	940	54.4
Labour	Henry Wheeler	895	51.8
Conservative	Geoff Walker	447	25.9
Conservative	Stuart Bestwick	409	23.7
UKIP	David Voce	303	17.5
Green	Jim Stuart	192	11.1
Turnout		1,727	
Rejected ballots		13	0.8
Labour hold			
Labour hold			

=== Daybrook ===
Daybrook (2)
Party	Candidate	Votes	%
Labour	Peter Barnes	888	64.5
Labour	Sandra Barnes	878	63.8
UKIP	Jordan Green	239	17.4
Independent	James Gamble	201	14.6
Conservative	Mark Riddle	173	12.6
Conservative	Eric Major	169	12.3
Turnout		1,377	
Rejected ballots		11	0.8
Labour hold			
Labour hold			

=== Dumbles ===
Dumbles (1)
Party	Candidate	Votes	%
Conservative	Helen Greensmith	618	61.4
Labour	Lee Garland	233	23.1
Liberal Democrats	Janet Dudley	128	12.7
Turnout		1,007	
Rejected ballots		28	2.8
Conservative hold			

=== Ernehale ===
Ernehale (2)
Party	Candidate	Votes	%
Labour	David Ellis	799	50.3
Labour	Roxanne Ellis	782	49.3
Conservative	Antony Burrows	362	22.8
Conservative	Robert Dawson	311	19.6
UKIP	Philip Smith	283	17.8
Independent	Paul Key	153	9.6
Independent	Desmond Peet	129	8.1
Liberal Democrats	Jason Stansfield	101	6.4
Liberal Democrats	Raymond Poynter	72	4.5
Turnout		1,587	
Rejected ballots		5	0.3
Labour hold			
Labour hold			

=== Gedling ===
Gedling (2)
Party	Candidate	Votes	%
Labour	Jenny Hollingsworth	917	54.6
Labour	Jennifer Thomas	792	47.2
Conservative	Jane Cook	447	26.6
Conservative	Alan Bexon	444	26.5
Liberal Democrats	Maggie Dunkin	339	20.2
Liberal Democrats	Martin White	268	16.0
Turnout		1,678	
Rejected ballots		38	2.3
Labour hold			
Labour gain from Conservative			

=== Netherfield ===
Netherfield (2)
Party	Candidate	Votes	%
Labour	John Clarke	775	67.0
Labour	Barbara Miller	762	65.9
Conservative	Anthony Pitman	218	18.9
Conservative	Curtis Large	209	18.1
Liberal Democrats	Fran Hajat	103	8.9
Liberal Democrats	Essop Hajat	97	8.4
Turnout		1,156	
Rejected ballots		51	4.4
Labour hold			
Labour hold			

=== Newstead Abbey ===
Newstead Abbey (3)
Party	Candidate	Votes	%
Conservative	Chris Barnfather	1,748	65.7
Conservative	Martin Smith	1,538	57.8
Conservative	Simon Murray	1,468	55.2
Labour	Carol Wright	686	25.8
Labour	Ben Harding	502	18.9
Labour	Adam Huckerby	489	18.4
Liberal Democrats	Tom Sutherland	449	16.9
Liberal Democrats	Margaret Swift	290	10.9
Liberal Democrats	Mark Tetley	221	8.3
Turnout		2,659	
Rejected ballots		38	1.4
Conservative hold			
Conservative hold			
Conservative hold			

=== Phoenix ===
Phoenix (2)
Party	Candidate	Votes	%
Liberal Democrats	Andrew Ellwood	828	56.0
Liberal Democrats	Clive Towsey-Hinton	790	53.4
Labour	Cheryl Hewlett	438	29.6
Labour	Verna Henry	429	29.0
Conservative	Charlie Godwin	194	13.1
Conservative	Chris Taylor	174	11.8
Turnout		1,479	
Rejected ballots		18	1.2
Liberal Democrats hold			
Liberal Democrats gain from Labour			

=== Plains ===
Plains (3)
Party	Candidate	Votes	%
Labour	Rosa Keneally	1,043	40.5
Labour	Michael Boyle	1,026	39.8
Conservative	John Parr	937	36.4
Labour	John Butterworth	928	36.0
Conservative	Kevin Doyle	887	34.4
Conservative	James Faulconbridge	886	34.4
Ind. Network	Sarah Hewson	630	24.5
Independent	Don Stickland	236	9.2
Liberal Democrats	Jen Pearce	203	7.9
Liberal Democrats	Martin Gladwell	173	6.7
Liberal Democrats	David Steele	154	6.0
Turnout		2,575	
Rejected ballots		31	1.2
Labour gain from Conservative			
Labour gain from Conservative			
Conservative hold			

=== Porchester ===
Porchester (3)
Party	Candidate	Votes	%
Labour	Bob Collis	1,503	57.0
Labour	Julie Najuk	1,482	56.2
Labour	John Truscott	1,447	54.9
Conservative	Alison Smith	591	22.4
Liberal Democrats	Alan Dawson	541	20.5
Liberal Democrats	Seb Soar	534	20.3
Conservative	Stephen Swann	533	20.2
Conservative	Stephen Powell	520	19.7
Liberal Democrats	Robert Swift	447	17.0
Turnout		2,635	
Rejected ballots		47	1.8
Labour hold			
Labour hold			
Labour hold			

=== Redhill ===
Redhill (2)
Party	Candidate	Votes	%
Labour	Michael Payne	1,188	65.5
Labour	Kathryn Fox	1,075	59.2
Conservative	Michael Abbott	437	24.1
Conservative	Malcolm Littlefair	329	18.1
UKIP	Andrew Lowdon	219	12.1
Liberal Democrats	Tadeusz Jones	102	5.6
Liberal Democrats	John Sutherland	66	3.6
Turnout		1,815	
Rejected ballots		13	0.7
Labour hold			
Labour hold			

=== Trent Valley ===
Trent Valley (2)
Party	Candidate	Votes	%
Conservative	Michael Adams	658	41.3
Conservative	Sam Smith	595	37.4
Labour	Margaret Strong	494	31.0
Labour	Femi Ogundipe	464	29.1
Liberal Democrats	Richard Fife	428	26.9
Liberal Democrats	John Flynn	422	26.5
Turnout		1,592	
Rejected ballots		20	1.3
Conservative hold			
Conservative hold			

=== Woodthorpe ===
Woodthorpe (2)
Party	Candidate	Votes	%
Labour	Viv McCrossen	1,124	55.0
Labour	Ron McCrossen	1,104	54.0
Conservative	Mark Clipsham	663	32.4
Conservative	James Stephenson	638	31.2
Liberal Democrats	Roger Patterson	221	10.8
Liberal Democrats	Andrew Swift	212	10.4
Turnout		2,044	
Rejected ballots		38	1.9
Labour hold			
Labour gain from Conservative			

== Changes 2019–2023 ==
- Simon Murray, elected as a Conservative councillor for Newstead Abbey, was created a life peer as Simon Murray, Baron Murray of Blidworth and appointed a Minister of State at the Home Office in October 2022; the resulting vacancy, notified in November 2022, fell within six months of the next ordinary election and so was not filled by a by-election, remaining vacant until the 2023 election.

=== By-elections ===
==== Cavendish ====
Cavendish by-election: 6 January 2022
Party	Candidate	Votes	%	±%
Liberal Democrats	Andrew Dunkin	344	35.1	+15.4
Labour	John Butterworth	303	30.9	−24.6
Conservative	Darren Maltby	250	25.5	+0.7
Independent	Fran Loi	56	5.7	N/A
Green	Jim Norris	26	2.7	N/A
Majority		41	4.2	
Turnout		981	23.3	
Registered electors		4,216		
Liberal Democrats gain from Labour		Swing	▲20.0	

The by-election was triggered by the sudden resignation of the sitting Labour councillor, Gary Gregory, in November 2021.

==== Gedling ====
Gedling by-election: 26 May 2022
Party	Candidate	Votes	%	±%
Labour	Lynda Pearson	693	39.3	N/A
Conservative	Charlie Godwin	544	30.9	N/A
Liberal Democrats	Maggie Dunkin	428	24.3	N/A
Green	Paul Sergent	95	5.4	N/A
Majority		149	8.5	
Turnout		1,762	36	
Rejected ballots		2	0.1	
Labour hold		Swing		

The by-election was triggered by the resignation of the sitting Labour councillor, Jennifer Thomas (who by then sat as Jennifer Hemingway), on 29 March 2022 after moving away from the borough.
