= 2007 Gedling Borough Council election =

2007 UK local government election

| ← 2003 | 3 May 2007 | 2011 → |

All 50 seats to Gedling Borough Council 26 seats needed for a majority
| | First party | Second party | Third party |
|---|---|---|---|
| Party | Conservative | Labour | Liberal Democrats |
| Seats before | 21 | 21 | 7 |
| Seats won | 28 | 9 | 9 |
| Seat change | +7 | -12 | +2 |
| | Fourth party |
| Party | Independent |
| Seats before | 1 |
| Seats won | 4 |
| Seat change | +3 |

Map of the results of the 2007 Gedling council election. Conservatives in blue, Labour in red, Liberal Democrats in yellow, Calverton First Independents in pink and Independent in grey.

An election was held on 3 May 2007 to elect members of Gedling Borough Council in Nottinghamshire, England. The whole council was up for election and the Conservative Party gained overall control of the council from no overall control.

== Election result ==
The results saw the Conservatives win a majority on the council, which they had previously shared control of with Labour. The Conservatives took 28 seats, up from 22 before the election. Labour dropped 11 seats to end level with the Liberal Democrats, who gained 2 seats, on 9 councillors. Overall turnout in the election was 40.4%, up from 32.4% in 2003.

Gedling local election result 2007
| Party | Seats | Gains | Losses | Net gain/loss | Seats % | Votes % | Votes | +/− |
|---|---|---|---|---|---|---|---|---|
| Conservative | 28 | 7 | 1 | +6 | 56.0 | 44.9 | 37,183 | +2.0 |
| Labour | 9 | 1 | 12 | -11 | 18.0 | 33.7 | 27,925 | -7.4 |
| Liberal Democrats | 9 | 2 | 0 | +2 | 18.0 | 14.9 | 12,339 | +3.6 |
| Calverton First Independents | 3 | 2 | 0 | +2 | 6.0 | 4.0 | 3,334 | +0.7 |
| Independent | 1 | 1 | 0 | +1 | 2.0 | 1.3 | 1,063 | 0.0 |
| UKIP | 0 | 0 | 0 | 0 | 0.0 | 0.9 | 780 | +0.9 |
| Green | 0 | 0 | 0 | 0 | 0.0 | 0.2 | 165 | +0.1 |

One Labour candidate was unopposed at the election.

== Ward results ==
Bestwood Village
| Party | Candidate | Votes | % | ±% |
|---|---|---|---|---|
| Labour | Denis Beeston | unopposed | | |
| Labour hold | | Swing | | |

Bonington (3)
| Party | Candidate | Votes | % | ±% |
|---|---|---|---|---|
| Conservative | Wilf Doe | 867 | | |
| Conservative | Gillian Fullwood | 854 | | |
| Conservative | Sally Mason-Kempster | 838 | | |
| Labour | Stella Lane | 737 | | |
| Labour | Andrew Rigby | 725 | | |
| Labour | Vivienne McCrossen | 707 | | |
| Turnout | | 4,728 | 32.3 | +6.4 |
| Conservative gain from Labour | | Swing | | |
| Conservative gain from Labour | | Swing | | |
| Conservative gain from Labour | | Swing | | |

Burton Joyce & Stoke Bardolph (2)
| Party | Candidate | Votes | % | ±% |
|---|---|---|---|---|
| Conservative | Patricia Blandamer | 702 | | |
| Conservative | Alan Bexon | 663 | | |
| Liberal Democrats | Richard Berry | 658 | | |
| Liberal Democrats | Richard Fife | 595 | | |
| Labour | Ian Howarth | 291 | | |
| Labour | Brigitte Maguire | 274 | | |
| Turnout | | 3,183 | 54.6 | +10.7 |
| Conservative hold | | Swing | | |
| Conservative hold | | Swing | | |

Calverton (3)
| Party | Candidate | Votes | % | ±% |
|---|---|---|---|---|
| Calverton First Independents | William Peet | 1,175 | | |
| Calverton First Independents | Anthony Barton | 1,094 | | |
| Calverton First Independents | Grant Withers | 1,065 | | |
| Labour | Gareth Griffiths | 669 | | |
| Labour | Pat Osbaldiston | 444 | | |
| Labour | Daniel Taylor | 443 | | |
| Turnout | | 4,890 | 34.4 | −0.6 |
| Independent hold | | Swing | | |
| Independent gain from Labour | | Swing | | |
| Independent gain from Labour | | Swing | | |

Carlton (3)
| Party | Candidate | Votes | % | ±% |
|---|---|---|---|---|
| Conservative | Robert Day | 991 | | |
| Conservative | Wendy Golland | 980 | | |
| Conservative | Richard Goodwin | 959 | | |
| Labour | Dennis Jones | 706 | | |
| Labour | Cheryl Hewlett | 677 | | |
| Labour | Christina Luckett | 657 | | |
| Liberal Democrats | Andrew Dunkin | 385 | | |
| Liberal Democrats | Andrew Sowter | 325 | | |
| Turnout | | 5,680 | 39.9 | +11.3 |
| Conservative hold | | Swing | | |
| Conservative hold | | Swing | | |
| Conservative hold | | Swing | | |

Carlton Hill (3)
| Party | Candidate | Votes | % | ±% |
|---|---|---|---|---|
| Labour | Seamus Creamer | 992 | | |
| Labour | Darrell Pulk | 987 | | |
| Labour | Paul Feeney | 961 | | |
| Conservative | Elaine Goodwin | 799 | | |
| Conservative | Thomas Butcher | 771 | | |
| Conservative | Mick Middleton | 768 | | |
| Liberal Democrats | Michael Shucksmith | 324 | | |
| Turnout | | 5,602 | 38.4 | +8.7 |
| Labour hold | | Swing | | |
| Labour hold | | Swing | | |
| Labour hold | | Swing | | |

Daybrook (2)
| Party | Candidate | Votes | % | ±% |
|---|---|---|---|---|
| Labour | Peter Barnes | 706 | | |
| Labour | Sandra Barnes | 693 | | |
| Conservative | Hazel Wilson | 461 | | |
| Conservative | Michael Smedley | 459 | | |
| Turnout | | 2,319 | 33.8 | +5.4 |
| Labour hold | | Swing | | |
| Labour hold | | Swing | | |

Gedling (3)
| Party | Candidate | Votes | % | ±% |
|---|---|---|---|---|
| Liberal Democrats | Gordon Tunnicliffe | 1,115 | | |
| Liberal Democrats | Marguerite Wright | 1,041 | | |
| Liberal Democrats | Margaret Dunkin | 985 | | |
| Conservative | Edward Godfrey | 634 | | |
| Conservative | Judith Nicholson | 622 | | |
| Conservative | Kevin Pitman | 619 | | |
| Labour | Jenny Hollingsworth | 409 | | |
| Labour | Allan Leadbeater | 393 | | |
| Labour | Ned Flaherty | 348 | | |
| Green | Helen Collyer | 165 | | |
| UKIP | Gemma Wolfe | 102 | | |
| Turnout | | 6,433 | 43.7 | +7.5 |
| Liberal Democrats hold | | Swing | | |
| Liberal Democrats hold | | Swing | | |
| Liberal Democrats hold | | Swing | | |

Killisick
| Party | Candidate | Votes | % | ±% |
|---|---|---|---|---|
| Independent | Harvey Maddock | 356 | 58.2 | +58.2 |
| Labour | Henry Wheeler | 256 | 41.8 | −10.9 |
| Majority | | 100 | 16.4 | N/A |
| Turnout | | 612 | 36.4 | +7.8 |
| Independent gain from Labour | | Swing | | |

Kingswell (2)
| Party | Candidate | Votes | % | ±% |
|---|---|---|---|---|
| Conservative | Rodney Kempster | 954 | | |
| Conservative | Vernon Bradley | 893 | | |
| Labour | Julia Buckby | 446 | | |
| Labour | Paul Maguire | 399 | | |
| UKIP | Peter Foulkes | 145 | | |
| Turnout | | 2,837 | 41.5 | +4.4 |
| Conservative hold | | Swing | | |
| Conservative hold | | Swing | | |

Lambley
| Party | Candidate | Votes | % | ±% |
|---|---|---|---|---|
| Conservative | Roland Spencer | 514 | 74.8 | +0.5 |
| Labour | Marion Welton | 173 | 25.2 | −0.5 |
| Majority | | 341 | 49.6 | +0.9 |
| Turnout | | 687 | 42.2 | +7.7 |
| Conservative hold | | Swing | | |

Mapperley Plains (3)
| Party | Candidate | Votes | % | ±% |
|---|---|---|---|---|
| Conservative | Veronica Pepper | 1,360 | | |
| Conservative | Gerald Clarke | 1,341 | | |
| Conservative | John Parr | 1,308 | | |
| Labour | Jenny Gale | 492 | | |
| Labour | Paul Wilkinson | 487 | | |
| Labour | Peter Osbaldiston | 482 | | |
| Liberal Democrats | Vera West | 351 | | |
| Liberal Democrats | Margaret Swift | 333 | | |
| Liberal Democrats | Minna Patterson | 299 | | |
| Turnout | | 6,453 | 38.9 | +10.9 |
| Conservative hold | | Swing | | |
| Conservative hold | | Swing | | |
| Conservative hold | | Swing | | |

Netherfield & Colwick (3)
| Party | Candidate | Votes | % | ±% |
|---|---|---|---|---|
| Labour | William Clarke | 826 | | |
| Labour | Barbara Miller | 807 | | |
| Labour | James O'Riordan | 780 | | |
| Conservative | Allen Clarke | 541 | | |
| Conservative | Allen M Clarke | 462 | | |
| Conservative | Cheryl Clarke | 443 | | |
| Liberal Democrats | Nora Crossland | 243 | | |
| UKIP | Patricia Wolfe | 235 | | |
| Liberal Democrats | Michael Kirk | 232 | | |
| Turnout | | 4,569 | 32.1 | +8.8 |
| Labour hold | | Swing | | |
| Labour gain from Conservative | | Swing | | |
| Labour hold | | Swing | | |

Newstead
| Party | Candidate | Votes | % | ±% |
|---|---|---|---|---|
| Conservative | Patricia Andrews | 360 | 50.7 | +0.8 |
| Labour | Philip Burnham | 289 | 40.7 | −9.4 |
| UKIP | Peter Wolfe | 61 | 8.6 | +8.6 |
| Majority | | 71 | 10.0 | |
| Turnout | | 710 | 43.7 | +10.8 |
| Conservative gain from Labour | | Swing | | |

Phoenix (2)
| Party | Candidate | Votes | % | ±% |
|---|---|---|---|---|
| Liberal Democrats | Raymond Poynter | 637 | | |
| Liberal Democrats | Andrew Ellwood | 600 | | |
| Labour | Ivan Gollop | 522 | | |
| Labour | Marje Paling | 424 | | |
| Conservative | Colin Blandamer | 242 | | |
| Conservative | Susan Jakeman | 240 | | |
| Turnout | | 2,665 | 39.6 | +6.0 |
| Liberal Democrats hold | | Swing | | |
| Liberal Democrats gain from Labour | | Swing | | |

Porchester (3)
| Party | Candidate | Votes | % | ±% |
|---|---|---|---|---|
| Conservative | John Tanner | 1,127 | | |
| Conservative | Eric Collin | 1,060 | | |
| Conservative | Jennifer Spencer | 1,034 | | |
| Labour | John Truscott | 853 | | |
| Labour | Pauline Allan | 830 | | |
| Labour | Cameron Macleod | 715 | | |
| Liberal Democrats | Josephine James | 373 | | |
| Liberal Democrats | Alasdair Pratt | 320 | | |
| UKIP | Mark Brinsley-Day | 237 | | |
| Turnout | | 6,549 | 43.8 | +9.8 |
| Conservative hold | | Swing | | |
| Conservative hold | | Swing | | |
| Conservative hold | | Swing | | |

Ravenshead (3)
| Party | Candidate | Votes | % | ±% |
|---|---|---|---|---|
| Conservative | Christopher Barnfather | 1,506 | | |
| Conservative | Colin Powell | 1,433 | | |
| Conservative | Mark Spencer (British politician) | 1,148 | | |
| Independent | Raj Chandran | 707 | | |
| Labour | Carol Wright | 480 | | |
| Labour | Gwilym Griffith | 421 | | |
| Labour | John Kendrick | 411 | | |
| Turnout | | 6,106 | 47.8 | +10.1 |
| Conservative hold | | Swing | | |
| Conservative hold | | Swing | | |
| Conservative hold | | Swing | | |

St. James (2)
| Party | Candidate | Votes | % | ±% |
|---|---|---|---|---|
| Liberal Democrats | Anthony Gillam | 588 | | |
| Liberal Democrats | Christopher Pratt | 562 | | |
| Conservative | David Doherty | 411 | | |
| Conservative | Bernard Leaper | 404 | | |
| Labour | Christine Russell | 348 | | |
| Labour | Melanie Fredericks | 345 | | |
| Turnout | | 2,658 | 41.6 | +16.5 |
| Liberal Democrats hold | | Swing | | |
| Liberal Democrats hold | | Swing | | |

St. Marys (3)
| Party | Candidate | Votes | % | ±% |
|---|---|---|---|---|
| Conservative | Magdalen Roach | 1,033 | | |
| Conservative | Robert Tait | 1,033 | | |
| Conservative | Terence Pepper | 1,018 | | |
| Labour | Jennifer Cole | 845 | | |
| Labour | Stewart Ragsdale | 790 | | |
| Labour | Grace Millar | 786 | | |
| Turnout | | 5,505 | 38.6 | +9.6 |
| Conservative gain from Labour | | Swing | | |
| Conservative gain from Labour | | Swing | | |
| Conservative gain from Labour | | Swing | | |

Valley (2)
| Party | Candidate | Votes | % | ±% |
|---|---|---|---|---|
| Liberal Democrats | Paul Hughes | 511 | | |
| Liberal Democrats | Deva Kumarasiri | 491 | | |
| Labour | Gary Gregory | 436 | | |
| Labour | Colette Roberts | 379 | | |
| Conservative | Mavis Gunson | 244 | | |
| Conservative | Derek Smith | 223 | | |
| Turnout | | 2,284 | 36.5 | +5.9 |
| Liberal Democrats hold | | Swing | | |
| Liberal Democrats gain from Labour | | Swing | | |

Woodborough
| Party | Candidate | Votes | % | ±% |
|---|---|---|---|---|
| Conservative | Francis Boot | 646 | 79.8 | +0.2 |
| Labour | Rosemary Gollop | 164 | 20.2 | −0.2 |
| Majority | | 482 | 59.5 | +0.2 |
| Turnout | | 810 | 54.5 | +14.5 |
| Conservative hold | | Swing | | |

Woodthorpe (3)
| Party | Candidate | Votes | % | ±% |
|---|---|---|---|---|
| Conservative | Suzanne Prew-Smith | 1,478 | | |
| Conservative | Melvyn Shepherd | 1,375 | | |
| Conservative | Richard Nicholson | 1,365 | | |
| Labour | Ron McCrossen | 682 | | |
| Labour | Les Nourse | 629 | | |
| Labour | Joy Knowles | 609 | | |
| Liberal Democrats | Andrew Swift | 491 | | |
| Liberal Democrats | Sandra Thornley | 469 | | |
| Liberal Democrats | Roger Patterson | 411 | | |
| Turnout | | 7,509 | 47.3 | +7.6 |
| Conservative hold | | Swing | | |
| Conservative hold | | Swing | | |
| Conservative hold | | Swing | | |
