= Nottinghamshire (district) =

- Proposed unitary authority area
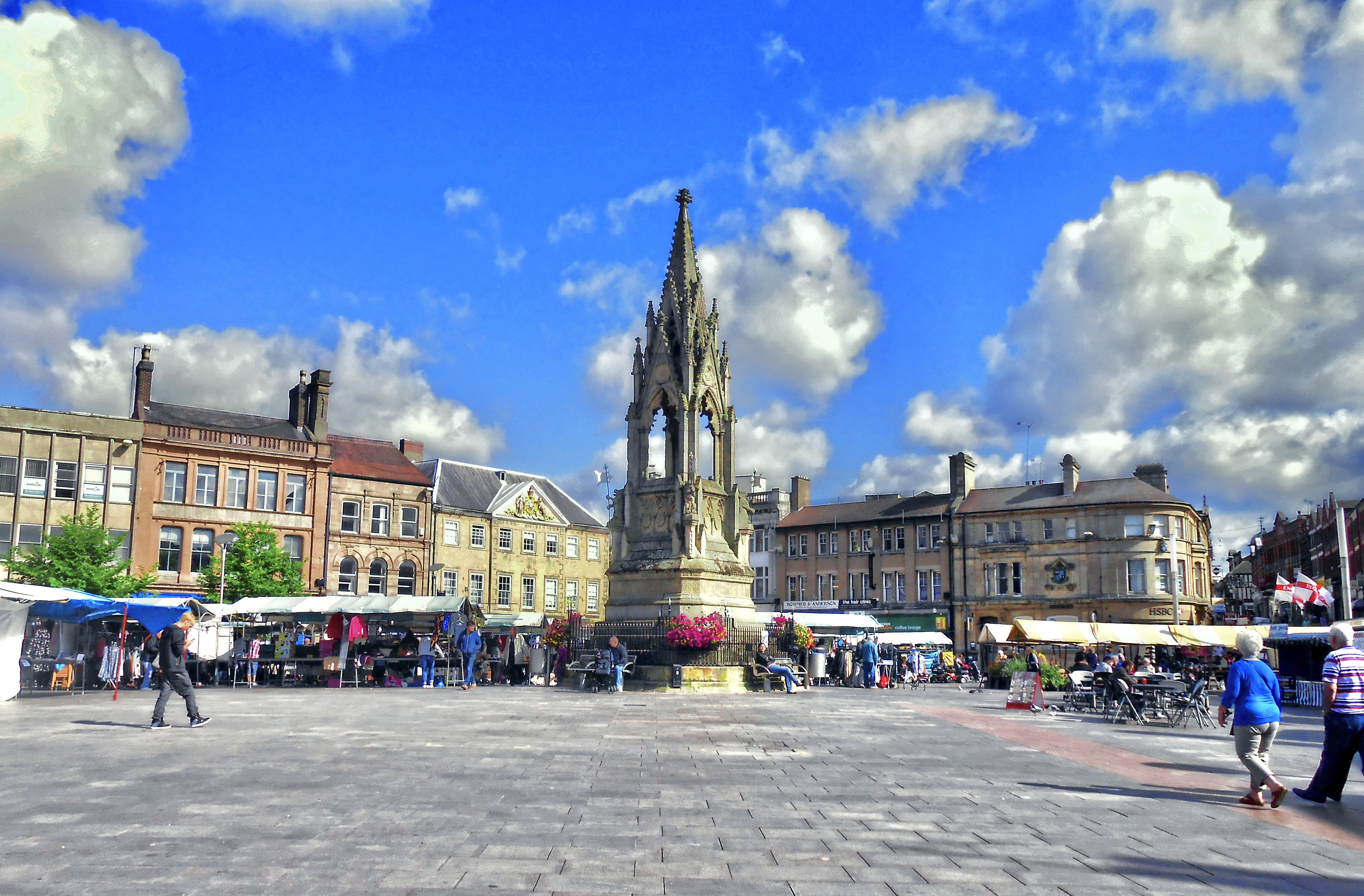
- Market Place in Mansfield

- Coordinates: 53.1512°N 1.2049°W
- Sovereign state: United Kingdom
- Country: England
- Region: East Midlands
- Ceremonial county: Nottinghamshire

Government
  - Type: Unitary authority
  - Body: Nottinghamshire Council

Area
  - Total: 640 sq mi (1,650 km^{2})

Population (2024 estimate)
  - Total: 569,587
- Time zone: UTC+0 (GMT)
  - Summer (DST): UTC+1 (BST)

Nottinghamshire or North and East Nottinghamshire was a proposed unitary authority area in the ceremonial county of Nottinghamshire, England. It was planned to be formed on 1 April 2028, with elections to a shadow authority planned to take place in May 2027. It would have covered Nottinghamshire outside of the Nottingham Urban Area, and its largest settlement would have been Mansfield. Other settlements include Kirkby, Newark-on-Trent, Retford, Southwell, Sutton-in-Ashfield and Worksop. In the south it includes Hucknall, an outlying part of the Nottingham Urban Area.

The area had an estimated population of 561,213 in 2023.

It would be formed from the existing two-tier districts of Ashfield, Bassetlaw, Mansfield, Newark and Sherwood and portions of the existing districts of Broxtowe, Gedling and Rushcliffe. The remaining portions of those districts would, with Nottingham itself, have formed the Greater Nottingham unitary authority.

It was being formed as part of ongoing local government changes throughout England, in which all areas of the country that have separate county councils and district councils will see those replaced with single-tier, or unitary, local governance. The two alternative proposals for two unitaries in the Nottinghamshire and Nottingham area were not accepted.

East Retford, Hucknall, Kirkby-in-Ashfield, Mansfield, Mansfield Woodhouse, Sutton-in-Ashfield and Worksop are currently unparished, the rest of the area is parished.

In September 2026, the Nottinghamshire proposals were halted by the government and placed under review. The 2027 election was cancelled. In October 2026, plans to create it were withdrawn. The decision was threatened with judicial review by Nottinghamshire County Council.
