= Michelle Welsh =

British politician

Michelle Welsh MP
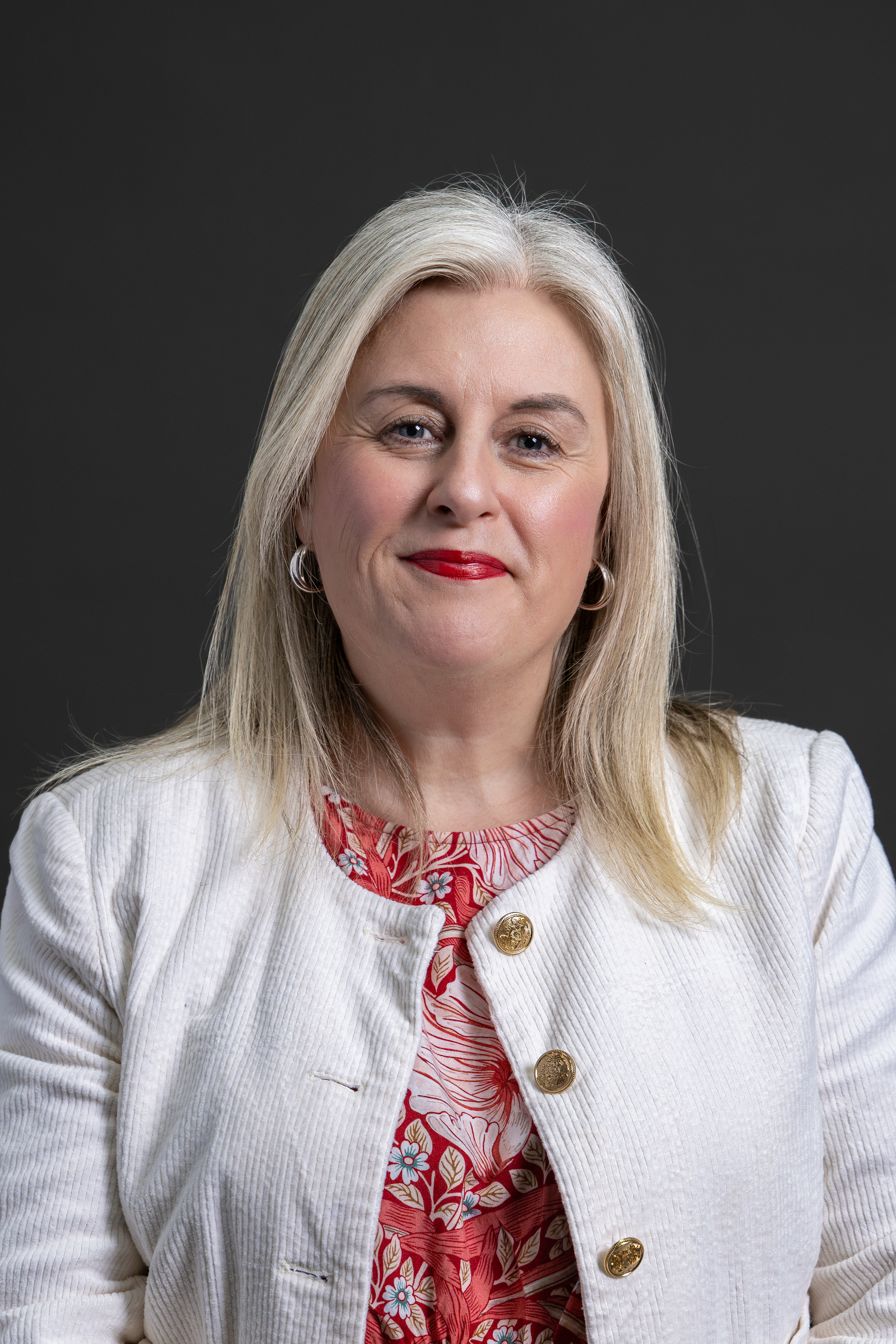
- Official portrait, 2026

Member of Parliament for Sherwood Forest
- Incumbent
- Assumed office 4 July 2024
- Preceded by: Mark Spencer
- Majority: 5,443 (11.2%)

Personal details
- Party: Labour

Michelle Welsh is a Labour Party politician who has been Member of Parliament for Sherwood Forest since 2024.

Before her election to Parliament, LabourList described her as "a councillor on Gedling Borough Council, representing Porchester ward, and on Nottinghamshire County Council, representing Arnold South." She was elected as a borough councillor in 2023 and a county councillor in 2021.

Welsh is also a school governor at Arnold View Primary School.

In May 2026 she was appointed as the Government's Maternity Adviser.
