= 2015 Gedling Borough Council election =

2015 UK local government election

- 7 May 2015

All 41 seats to Gedling Borough Council 21 seats needed for a majority
	First party	Second party	Third party
Party	Labour	Conservative	Liberal Democrats
Seats before	31	15	3
Seats won	25	15	1
Seat change	-6	0	-2
Popular vote	51,256	48,067	7,687
Percentage	39.2%	36.8%	5.9%
Swing	-7.5%	-1.1%	-5.4%
- Map of the results

An election was held on 7 May 2015 to elect all members of Gedling Borough Council in Nottinghamshire, England as part of the English local elections coinciding with the 2015 General Election. Each councillor serves a four-year term of office.

Following Boundary Commission recommendations boundary change took place for this election to provide for 19 wards, many of which are two or three-member, thus electing 41 councillors.

== Results ==
=== Summary of Results ===
Labour Party candidates won a majority, exceeding the 21 member threshold needed to reach majority party status, formerly having 64% of councillors. The Conservative group was formerly the opposition party on the council, holding 15 seats out of 50 on the larger council between 2011 and 2015. The remainder of councillors comprised Liberal Democrat members, formerly holding 3 seats on the council from 2011 to 2015, returned 1 of the council's 41 councillors.

Gedling Borough 2015
Party	Candidates						Votes		
Party	Stood	Elected	Gained	Unseated	Net	% of total	%	No.	Net %
Labour	41	25	-	-	-	61.0%	39.2%	51,256	-
Conservative	41	15	-	-	-	36.6%	36.8%	48,067	-
Liberal Democrats	22	1	-	-	-	2.4%	5.9%	7,687	-
UKIP	41	0	-	-	-	0.0%	16.3%	21,228	-
Green	8	0	-	-	-	0.0%	1.3%	1,645	-
Independent	3	0	-	-	-	0.0%	0.5%	636	-
TUSC	1	0	-	-	-	0.0%	0.1%	94	-

== Ward results ==
=== Bestwood St Albans ===
Bestwood St Albans (2)
Party	Candidate	Votes	%
Labour	Denis Beeston	1,143	27.7
Conservative	Tammy Bisset	884	19.1
Labour	Ron McCrossen	859	18.5
Conservative	Lucy Shipley	756	16.3
UKIP	Dawn Rood	521	11.2
UKIP	Simon Rood	473	10.2
Turnout			

=== Calverton ===
Calverton (3)
Party	Candidate	Votes	%
Conservative	Boyd Elliott	1,610	15.6
Conservative	Paul Stirland	1,432	13.9
Conservative	Jane Walker	1,357	13.2
Labour	Mike Hope	1,246	12.1
Labour	Nick Quilty	1,162	11.3
Labour	Pat Marks	1,112	10.8
UKIP	Patrica Rutt	706	6.8
UKIP	Robin Rutt	683	6.6
UKIP	Grant Withers	662	6.4
Independent	Pat Bosworth	348	3.4
Turnout			

=== Carlton ===
Carlton (2)
Party	Candidate	Votes	%
Labour	Nicki Brooks	1,362	26.1
Labour	Paul Wilkinson	1,119	21.4
Conservative	Robert Dawson	798	15.3
Conservative	Bernard Leaper	706	13.5
UKIP	Sally Cook	509	9.7
UKIP	Steve Cook	501	9.6
Liberal Democrats	Philip Whitaker	128	2.5
Liberal Democrats	Michel Flor-Henry	105	2.0
Turnout			

=== Carlton Hill ===
Carlton Hill (3)
Party	Candidate	Votes	%
Labour	Jim Creamer	1,924	17.3
Labour	Paul Feeney	1,865	16.7
Labour	Alex Scroggie	1,705	15.3
Conservative	Geoffrey Trout	982	8.8
Conservative	April Jackson	949	8.5
Conservative	Irene Trout	909	8.2
UKIP	Frank Browett	791	7.1
UKIP	Patricia Browett	733	6.6
UKIP	Nina Peterson-Tait	638	5.7
Liberal Democrats	Anne Talbot	251	2.3
Liberal Democrats	Jenet Dudley	212	1.9
Liberal Democrats	Roger Patterson	186	1.7
Turnout			

=== Cavendish ===
Cavendish (2)
Party	Candidate	Votes	%
Labour	Gary Gregory	953	18.7
Labour	Emily Bailey	943	18.5
Liberal Democrats	Andrew Dunkin	630	12.4
Liberal Democrats	Paul Hughes	612	12.0
Conservative	Tanya Hinds	599	11.7
UKIP	Charles Jansan	503	9.9
Conservative	Terry Pepper	490	9.6
UKIP	Deva Kumarasiri	373	7.3
Turnout			

=== Colwick ===
Colwick (1)
Party	Candidate	Votes	%
Labour	Meredith Lawrence	566	41.4
Conservative	James Faulconbridge	515	37.7
UKIP	Benjamin Scott-Nelson	204	14.9
Green	Jean Katimertzis	81	5.9
Turnout			

=== Coppice ===
Coppice (2)
Party	Candidate	Votes	%
Labour	Marje Paling	1,250	21.1
Labour	Henry Wheeler	1,191	20.1
Conservative	Ged Clarke	1,024	17.3
Conservative	Julie Catkin	1,017	17.1
UKIP	David Voce	575	9.7
UKIP	Anthony Hall	542	9.1
Green	Jim Stuart	170	2.9
Green	Margret Vince	164	2.8
Turnout			

=== Daybrook ===
Daybrook (2)
Party	Candidate	Votes	%
Labour	Peter Barnes	1,392	28.5
Labour	Sandra Barnes	1,344	27.6
Conservative	David Ward	584	12.0
Conservative	Gerald Kenwood	534	11.0
UKIP	Andrew Brierley	514	10.5
UKIP	James Gamble	509	10.4
Turnout			

=== Dumbles ===
Dumbles (1)
Party	Candidate	Votes	%
Conservative	Helen Greensmith	1,265	67.3
Labour	John Bailey	390	20.7
UKIP	Wes Stala	226	12.0
Turnout			

=== Ernehale ===
Ernehale (2)
Party	Candidate	Votes	%
Labour	Roxanne Ellis	1,068	18.5
Labour	David Ellis	1,060	18.4
Conservative	Vanessa Faulconbridge	911	15.8
Conservative	Natalie Sharpe	893	15.5
UKIP	John Hart	575	10.0
UKIP	Lee Waters	501	8.7
Green	Jeannie Thompson	180	3.1
Liberal Democrats	Jason Stansfield	164	2.8
Independent	Paul Key	145	2.5
Independent	Desmond Peet	143	2.5
Liberal Democrats	Margaret Swift	137	2.4
Turnout			

=== Gedling ===
Gedling (2)
Party	Candidate	Votes	%
Labour	Jenny Hollingworth	1,176	20.1
Conservative	Alan Bexon	994	17.0
Labour	Lynda Pearson	927	15.9
Conservative	Tony Pitman	693	11.9
Liberal Democrats	Maggie Dunkin	652	11.2
Liberal Democrats	Martin White	448	7.7
UKIP	Philip Pritchard	381	6.5
UKIP	Piero Loi	375	6.4
Green	Paul Sergent	203	3.5
Turnout			

=== Netherfield ===
Netherfield (2)
Party	Candidate	Votes	%
Labour	William Clarke	1,183	25.6
Labour	Barbara Miller	1,128	24.4
Conservative	Maureen Cook	524	11.4
Conservative	Valerie Skerritt	473	10.3
UKIP	Gary Bird	462	10.0
UKIP	Sacha Loi	381	8.3
Green	Nick Martin	276	6.0
Liberal Democrats	Nora Crossland	100	2.2
Liberal Democrats	Marguerite Wright	88	1.9
Turnout			

=== Newstead Abbey ===
Newstead Abbey (3)
Party	Candidate	Votes	%
Conservative	Chris Barnfather	3,126	23.4
Conservative	Bruce Andrews	2,944	22.1
Conservative	Colin Powell	2,590	19.4
Labour	Caro Wright	1,213	9.1
Labour	David Ringwood	968	7.3
Labour	Michael Towers	909	6.8
UKIP	Raj Chandran	659	4.9
UKIP	Christina Stala	508	3.8
UKIP	Rhea Waters	431	3.2
Turnout			

=== Phoenix ===
Phoenix (2)
Party	Candidate	Votes	%
Liberal Democrats	Andrew Ellwood	885	17.4
Labour	Kathryn Fox	876	17.2
Labour	Cheryl Hewlett	844	16.6
Liberal Democrats	Clive Towsey-Hinton	743	14.6
Conservative	Geoffrey Richardson	473	9.3
UKIP	Graham Roebuck	449	8.8
UKIP	Fran Loi	432	8.5
Conservative	Gwen White	398	7.8
Turnout			

=== Plains ===
Plains (3)
Party	Candidate	Votes	%
Conservative	Carol Pepper	1,982	14.7
Conservative	John Parr	1,975	14.6
Conservative	Sarah Hewson	1,924	14.2
Labour	Desmond Gibbons	1,520	11.2
Labour	Errol Henry	1,397	10.3
Labour	John Butterworth	1,390	10.3
UKIP	Gillian Barker	754	5.6
UKIP	John Barlow	739	5.5
UKIP	Peter Foulkes	633	4.7
Green	Kathy Read	295	2.2
Green	Jim Norris	273	2.0
Liberal Democrats	Vera West	259	1.9
Liberal Democrats	Max Beeken	197	1.5
Liberal Democrats	Raymond Poynter	187	1.4
Turnout			

=== Porchester ===
Porchester (3)
Party	Candidate	Votes	%
Labour	Bob Collis	2,323	18.0
Labour	John Truscott	2,224	17.2
Labour	Muriel Weisz	2,084	16.1
Conservative	Eric Collin	1,665	12.9
Conservative	Ashley Foster	1,405	10.9
Conservative	Linda Foster	1,397	10.8
UKIP	Mark Brinsley-Day	683	5.3
UKIP	Allan Hare	627	4.9
UKIP	Gloria Roberts	504	3.9
Turnout			

=== Redhill ===
Redhill (2)
Party	Candidate	Votes	%
Labour	Michael Payne	1,449	23.5
Labour	Pauline Allan	1,406	22.8
Conservative	Sam Smith	1,141	18.5
Conservative	Geoffrey Walker	1,092	17.7
UKIP	George Rose	551	8.9
UKIP	Philip Smith	523	8.5
Turnout			

=== Trent Valley ===
Trent Valley (2)
Party	Candidate	Votes	%
Conservative	Kevin Doyle	1,206	20.0
Conservative	Stephen Poole	1,170	19.4
Labour	Jeanette Johnson	906	15.0
Labour	Margaret Strong	809	13.4
Liberal Democrats	Richard M^{ac}Duff Fife	584	9.7
Liberal Democrats	John Flynn	534	8.9
UKIP	Colin Blandamer	426	7.1
UKIP	Pat Blandamer	398	6.6
Turnout			

=== Woodthorpe ===
Woodthorpe (2)
Party	Candidate	Votes	%
Labour	Viv McCrossen	1,396	21.3
Conservative	Michael Adams	1,379	21.0
Conservative	Suzanne Prew-Smith	1,301	19.8
Labour	Rob Pearson	1,229	18.7
Liberal Democrats	Andrew Swift	316	4.8
UKIP	Paul Marshall	296	4.5
UKIP	Sandra Marshall	277	4.2
Liberal Democrats	Minna Patterson	269	4.1
TUSC	Ian Mansell	94	1.4
Turnout			
