= Greater Nottingham =

- Proposed unitary authority area
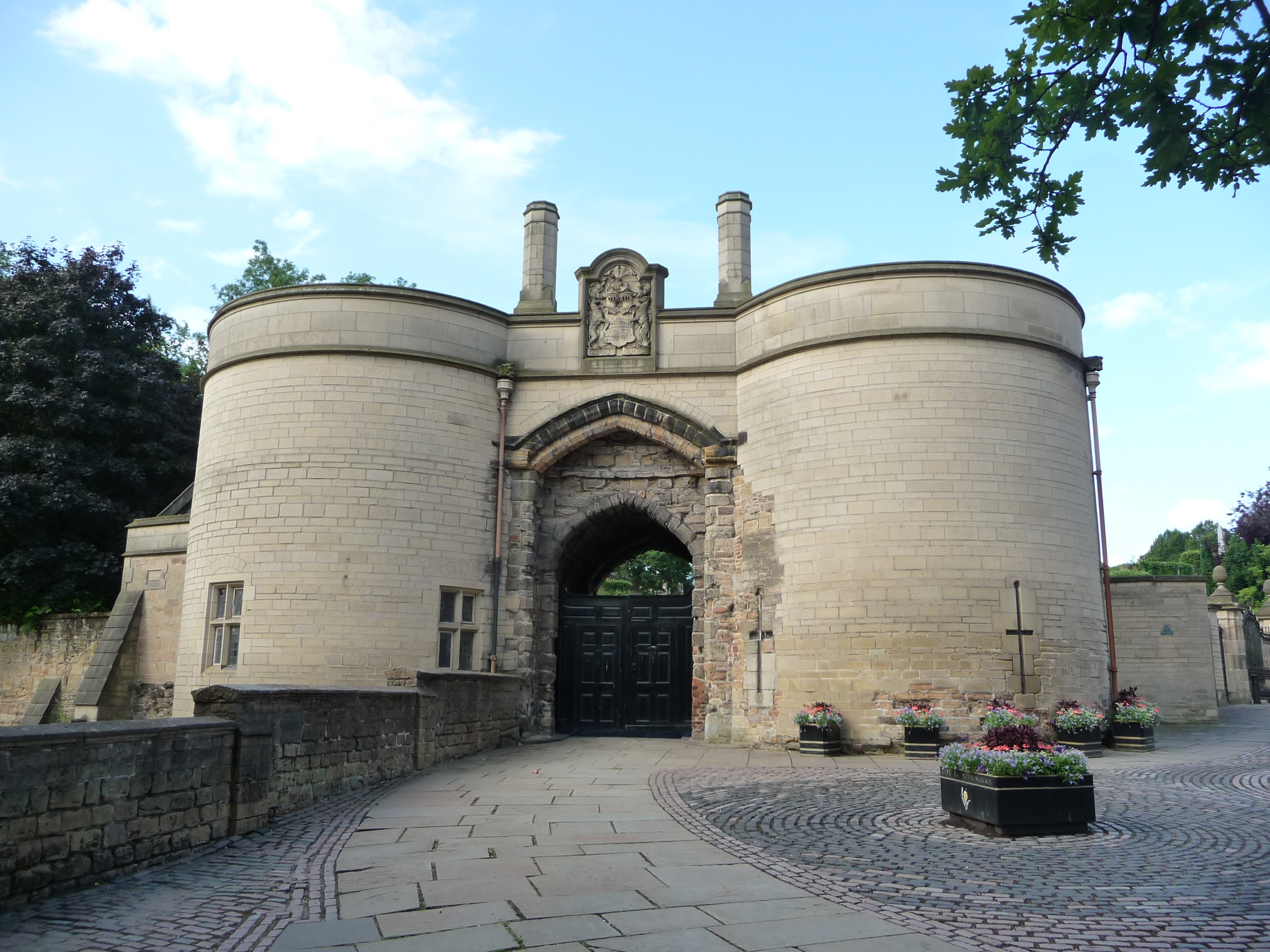
- Nottingham Castle

- Interactive map
- Coordinates: 52.9564°N 1.1506°W
- Sovereign state: United Kingdom
- Country: England
- Region: East Midlands
- Shire county: Nottinghamshire
- Combined authority: the East Midlands

Government
  - Type: Unitary authority
  - Body: Greater Nottingham Council

Area
  - Total: 190 sq mi (500 km^{2})

Population (2024 estimate)
  - Total: 618,503
- Time zone: UTC+0 (GMT)
  - Summer (DST): UTC+1 (BST)

Greater Nottingham or Southwest Nottinghamshire was a proposed unitary authority area in the ceremonial county of Nottinghamshire, England. It was planned to be formed on 1 April 2028 and the first elections was planned to take place in May 2027. It was to cover most of the Nottingham Urban Area and some adjacent countryside and villages. The area has a population of 612,557 (2023 ONS estimate).

It would have been formed from the existing unitary authority of Nottingham and portions of the two-tier Nottinghamshire districts of Broxtowe, Gedling and Rushcliffe. The remaining portions of those districts would have formed part of a Nottinghamshire unitary authority. Plans to create it were halted in September 2026 and the 2027 election was cancelled. In October 2026, plans to create it were withdrawn.

== Geography ==
It was to cover most of the Nottingham Urban Area including Nottingham, Arnold, Beeston, West Bridgford, Carlton, Kimberley, and Ruddington. It would have also include the smaller settlements of Radcliffe on Trent, Keyworth and East Leake and various outlying villages. Some of the conurbation would not be covered, including Hucknall which is to be part of the Nottinghamshire unitary, and Long Eaton, which is over the border in Derbyshire and would have become part of the Southern Derbyshire unitary.

=== Parishes ===
Arnold, Carlton, Nottingham, West Bridgford and the Beeston area are currently unparished, the rest of the area is parished. The parishes in the district would have been:

- Awsworth
- Barton in Fabis
- Bradmore
- Bunny
- Burton Joyce
- Clipston
- Colwick
- Cossall
- Costock
- Cotgrave
- East Leake
- Fairham (Note: To be established prior to the local elections in 2027.)
- Gamston
- Gotham
- Greasley (part)
- Holme Pierrepont
- Keyworth
- Kimberley
- Kingston on Soar
- Normanton on Soar
- Normanton-on-the-Wolds
- Nuthall
- Plumtree
- Radcliffe on Trent
- Ratcliffe on Soar
- Rempstone
- Ruddington
- Stanford on Soar
- Stanton-on-the-Wolds
- Stapleford
- Stoke Bardolph
- Sutton Bonnington
- Tollerton
- Thorpe in the Glebe
- Thrumpton
- Trowell
- West Leake
- Widmerpool
- Willoughby on the Wolds
- Wysall

== Formation ==
Greater Nottingham was being formed as part of ongoing local government changes throughout England, in which all areas of the country that have separate county councils and district councils will see those replaced with single-tier, or unitary, local governance. The two alternative proposals for two unitaries, one of which would have seen all of Broxtowe and either Rushcliffe or Gedling joined with Nottingham were not accepted. Hucknall is in the Ashfield District, which was not included in any of these three proposals.

In September 2026, the Nottinghamshire proposals were halted by the government and placed under review. The 2027 election was cancelled. In October 2026, plans to create it were withdrawn. The decision was threatened with judicial review by Nottinghamshire County Council.
