= 1999 Gedling Borough Council election =

1999 UK local government election

← 1995	May 1999	2003 →

All 57 seats to Gedling Borough Council 29 seats needed for a majority
	First party	Second party	Third party
Party	Conservative	Labour	Liberal Democrats
Seats won	29	18	7
	Fourth party
Party	Independent
Seats won	3

An election was held on 6 May 1999 to elect members of Gedling Borough Council in Nottinghamshire, England. The whole council was up for election and the Conservative party gained overall control of the council from the Labour party.

== Background ==
At the last election in 1995 Labour took control of the council with 29 seats, compared to 20 for the Conservatives, 7 Liberal Democrats and 1 independent. Gedling was reported as being a swing council in 1999, with the Conservatives requiring 9 gains on a swing of 4.5% to win control.

== Election result ==
Overall turnout in the election was 35.0%, down from 44.7% in 1995.

Gedling local election result 1999
Party	Seats	Gains	Losses	Net gain/loss	Seats %	Votes %	Votes	+/−
Conservative	29			+10	50.9			
Labour	18			-12	31.6			
Liberal Democrats	7			0	12.3			
Independent	3			+2	5.3			
