= 2003 Gedling Borough Council election =

English council election

← 1999	May 2003	2007 →

All 50 seats to Gedling Borough Council 26 seats needed for a majority
	First party	Second party	Third party
Party	Conservative	Labour	Liberal Democrats
Seats won	21	21	7
	Fourth party
Party	Independent
Seats won	1

Map of the results of the 2003 Gedling council election. Conservatives in blue, Labour in red, Liberal Democrats in yellow and Independent in grey.

An election was held on 1 May 2003 to elect members of Gedling Borough Council in Nottinghamshire, England. The whole council was up for election with boundary changes since the last election in 1999 reducing the number of seats by 7. The Conservative Party lost overall control of the council to no overall control.

== Background ==
At the last election in 1999 the Conservatives gained control of the council from the Labour Party with 29 seats, compared to 18 for Labour, 7 Liberal Democrats and 3 independents.

Boundary changes between 1999 and 2003 reduced the number of seats from 57 to 50. The changes included removing the wards of Cavendish, Conway and Priory, while creating new wards of Daybrook and Valley.

== Election result ==
Overall turnout in the election was 32.4%, down from 35.0% in 1999.

Following the election a power sharing agreement was reached with the Conservative and Labour parties agreeing to share the post of leader of the council.

Gedling local election result 2003
Party	Seats	Gains	Losses	Net gain/loss	Seats %	Votes %	Votes	+/−
Conservative	21			-8	42.0	42.9	29,511	
Labour	21			+2	42.0	41.1	28,321	
Liberal Democrats	7			0	14.0	11.3	7,777	
Independent	1			-1	2.0	4.6	3,160	
Green	0			0	0	0.1	73	

== Ward results ==
Bestwood Village
Party	Candidate	Votes	%	±%
Labour	Denis Beeston	306	70.3	
Conservative	Thomas Roach	129	29.7	
Majority		177	40.6	
Turnout		435	33.5	

Bonington (3)
Party	Candidate	Votes	%	±%
Labour	Stella Lane	748		
Labour	Stephen Rigby	735		
Labour	Vivienne McCrossen	703		
Conservative	Terence Pepper	567		
Conservative	Robert Tait	560		
Conservative	Balraj Johal	499		
Turnout		3,812	25.9	

Burton Joyce & Stoke Bardolph (2)
Party	Candidate	Votes	%	±%
Conservative	Patricia Blandamer	551		
Conservative	Alan Bexon	515		
Liberal Democrats	Richard Berry	449		
Liberal Democrats	Andrew Ellwood	362		
Labour	Jeanette Johnson	331		
Labour	Brigitte Maguire	301		
Turnout		2,509	43.9	

Calverton (3)
Party	Candidate	Votes	%	±%
Calverton First Independents	William Peet	808		
Labour	James Woodward	786		
Labour	Gareth Griffiths	785		
Calverton First Independents	William Mellors	761		
Labour	Alan Woodward	730		
Calverton First Independents	Grant Withers	716		
Conservative	Mark Winter	383		
Conservative	Simon Massey	314		
Turnout		5,283	35.0	

Carlton (3)
Party	Candidate	Votes	%	±%
Conservative	Robert Day	712		
Conservative	Wendy Golland	691		
Conservative	Richard Goodwin	681		
Labour	Cheryl Hewlett	653		
Labour	Damian Belshaw	623		
Labour	Barbara Miller	611		
Liberal Democrats	Andrew Sowter	299		
Turnout		4,270	28.6	

Carlton Hill (3)
Party	Candidate	Votes	%	±%
Labour	Darrell Pulk	942		
Labour	Paul Feeney	939		
Labour	Seamus Creamer	938		
Conservative	Susan Jakeman	601		
Conservative	Peter Foulkes	594		
Conservative	Thomas Butcher	592		
Turnout		4,606	29.7	

Daybrook (2)
Party	Candidate	Votes	%	±%
Labour	Peter Barnes	731		
Labour	Sandra Barnes	713		
Conservative	Lorraine Beaumont	308		
Conservative	Michael Smedley	298		
Turnout		2,050	28.4	

Gedling (3)
Party	Candidate	Votes	%	±%
Liberal Democrats	Gordon Tunniclife	1,067		
Liberal Democrats	Marguerite Wright	1,060		
Liberal Democrats	Margaret Dunkin	970		
Conservative	Edward Godfrey	508		
Conservative	Andrew Bell	489		
Conservative	Kevin Alcock	461		
Labour	Jennifer Hollingsworth	317		
Labour	Allan Leadbeater	303		
Labour	James O'Riordan	269		
Turnout		5,444	36.2	

Killisick
Party	Candidate	Votes	%	±%
Labour	Harvey Maddock	280	52.7	
Liberal Democrats	Anthony Turner	92	17.3	
Conservative	Derek Smith	86	16.2	
Green	Henry Wheeler	73	13.7	
Majority		188	35.4	
Turnout		531	28.6	

Kingswell (2)
Party	Candidate	Votes	%	±%
Conservative	Rodney Kempster	845		
Conservative	Vernon Bradley	749		
Labour	Martin Hall	374		
Labour	Julia Buckby	335		
Independent	Edna Hindle	214		
Independent	Clifford Hindle	179		
Turnout		2,696	37.1	

Lambley
Party	Candidate	Votes	%	±%
Conservative	Roland Spencer	417	74.3	
Labour	Marjorie Paling	144	25.7	
Majority		273	48.6	
Turnout		561	34.5	

Mapperley Plains (3)
Party	Candidate	Votes	%	±%
Conservative	Veronica Pepper	1,013		
Conservative	John Parr	989		
Conservative	Gerald Clarke	979		
Labour	Peter Crossley	607		
Labour	Nicola Brooks	606		
Labour	Alan Hardy	592		
Turnout		4,786	28.0	

Netherfield & Colwick (3)
Party	Candidate	Votes	%	±%
Labour	Albert Clarke	768		
Labour	William Clarke	760		
Labour	Christina Lockett	728		
Conservative	Anthony Morris	397		
Conservative	Judith Nicholson	368		
Conservative	Richard Smedley	362		
Turnout		3,383	23.3	

Newstead
Party	Candidate	Votes	%	±%
Labour	John McCauley	265	50.1	
Conservative	Bruce Andrews	264	49.9	
Majority		1	0.2	
Turnout		529	32.9	

Phoenix (2)
Party	Candidate	Votes	%	±%
Labour	Ivan Gollop	539		
Liberal Democrats	Raymond Poynter	519		
Labour	Arthur Turney	501		
Liberal Democrats	Paul Hughes	471		
Conservative	Ann Collin	187		
Conservative	Colin Blandamer	186		
Turnout		2,403	33.6	

Porchester (3)
Party	Candidate	Votes	%	±%
Conservative	John Tanner	907		
Conservative	Donald Pycroft	892		
Conservative	Jennifer Spencer	854		
Labour	John Truscott	832		
Labour	Paul Barton	811		
Labour	Leslie Nourse	779		
Turnout		5,075	34.0	

Ravenshead (3)
Party	Candidate	Votes	%	±%
Conservative	William Grainger	1,226		
Conservative	Thambithurai Chandran	1,098		
Conservative	Mark Spencer (British politician)	1,085		
Labour	Gwilym Griffith	582		
Labour	John Kendrick	564		
Labour	Barrie Bowker	404		
Turnout		4,959	37.7	

St. James (2)
Party	Candidate	Votes	%	±%
Liberal Democrats	Anthony Gillam	654		
Liberal Democrats	Christopher Pratt	598		
Conservative	Eric Collin	351		
Conservative	Elaine Goodwin	325		
Labour	Gary Gregory	257		
Labour	Paul Wilkinson	234		
Turnout		2,419	25.1	

St. Marys (3)
Party	Candidate	Votes	%	±%
Labour	Jennifer Cole	794		
Labour	Grace Millar	779		
Labour	Stewart Ragsdale	762		
Conservative	Magdalen Roach	689		
Conservative	Paul Beaumont	647		
Conservative	Mavis Gunson	639		
Turnout		4,310	29.0	

Valley (2)
Party	Candidate	Votes	%	±%
Liberal Democrats	Andrew Dunkin	404		
Labour	Christopher Preston	379		
Labour	Daniel Taylor	368		
Liberal Democrats	Andrew Swift	353		
Conservative	Wesley Bleakley	208		
Conservative	Bernard Leaper	205		
Turnout		1,917	30.6	

Woodborough
Party	Candidate	Votes	%	±%
Conservative	John Glass	485	79.6	
Labour	Liz Delaney	124	20.4	
Majority		361	59.2	
Turnout		609	40.0	

Woodthorpe (3)
Party	Candidate	Votes	%	±%
Conservative	Suzanne Prew-Smith	1,216		
Conservative	Richard Nicholson	1,206		
Conservative	Francis Boot	1,183		
Labour	Ronald McCrossen	613		
Labour	Christine Russell	576		
Labour	Philip Miller	500		
Liberal Democrats	Margaret Swift	479		
Independent	Christine Hindle	266		
Independent	David Hindle	216		
Turnout		6,255	39.7	
