= 2011 Gedling Borough Council election =

Election in Nottinghamshire, England

- 5 May 2011

All 50 seats to Gedling Borough Council 26 seats needed for a majority
	First party	Second party	Third party
Party	Labour	Conservative	Liberal Democrats
Seats before	9	28	9
Seats won	31	15	4
Seat change	+22	-13	-5

Map of the results of the 2011 Gedling council election. Labour in red, Conservatives in blue and Liberal Democrats in yellow.

An election was held on 5 May 2011 to elect members of Gedling Borough Council in Nottinghamshire, England. The whole council was up for election and the Labour Party gained overall control of the council from the Conservative Party.

== Campaign ==
Before the election the Conservatives ran the council with 28 seats, compared to 9 for Labour, 8 Liberal Democrats and 5 independents.

A big issue in the election was the introduction of car parking charges by the Conservative council. Labour said that local businesses were suffering because of the charges and proposed to end the charges and cut the number of councillors, while the Conservatives said the charges enabled them to preserve services and keep council tax down. Meanwhile, the Liberal Democrats expected that they and the Conservatives would suffer due to the cuts being made by the national coalition government.

== Election result ==
The results saw Labour gain control of the council from the Conservatives, after taking 13 seats from the Conservative Party, 5 from the Liberal Democrats and all 5 independent seats. This left Labour with 32 seats, compared to 15 Conservatives and 3 Liberal Democrats. Overall turnout in the election was 45.3%.

Gedling local election result 2011
Party	Seats	Gains	Losses	Net gain/loss	Seats %	Votes %	Votes	+/−
Labour	31	22	0	+22	64.0	46.7	44,416	+13.0
Conservative	15	0	13	-13	30.0	37.9	36,033	-7.0
Liberal Democrats	4	0	5	-5	6.0	11.3	10,762	-3.6
Calverton First Independents	0	0	3	-3	0.0	2.1	2,017	-1.9
Independent	0	0	2	-2	0.0	1.1	1,056	-0.2
Green	0	0	0	0	0.0	0.6	550	+0.4
UKIP	0	0	0	0	0.0	0.2	228	-0.7

== Ward results ==
=== Bestwood Village ===
Bestwood Village
Party	Candidate	Votes	%
Labour	Denis Beeston	382	58.1
Conservative	Stuart Coull	275	41.9
Turnout		657	43.3
Labour hold			

=== Bonington ===
Bonington (3)
Party	Candidate	Votes	%
Labour	Roy Allan	1,048	18.3
Labour	Roxanne Ellis	995	17.4
Labour	Phil McCauley	961	16.8
Conservative	Gillian Fullwood	778	13.6
Conservative	Sally Mason-Kempster	758	13.2
Conservative	Geoff Walker	750	13.1
Liberal Democrats	Marion Smalley	175	3.1
Liberal Democrats	Minna Patterson	141	2.5
Liberal Democrats	Martin Walkyier	125	2.2
Turnout		5,731	39.8
Labour gain from Conservative			
Labour gain from Conservative			
Labour gain from Conservative			

=== Burton Joyce and Stoke Bardolph ===
Burton Joyce and Stoke Bardolph (2)
Party	Candidate	Votes	%
Conservative	Steve Poole	777	23.1
Conservative	Sarah Tomlinson	764	22.7
Liberal Democrats	Richard Fife	461	13.7
Liberal Democrats	John Flynn	437	13.0
Labour	Jeanette Johnson	359	10.7
Labour	Ferni Ogundipe	291	8.6
Independent	Pat Blandamer	166	4.9
Independent	Colin Blandamer	112	3.3
Turnout		3,367	58.7
Conservative hold			
Conservative hold			

=== Calverton ===
Calverton (3)
Party	Candidate	Votes	%
Labour	Emily Bailey	1,098	18.0
Labour	Nick Quilty	1,010	16.6
Labour	Mike Hope	1,003	16.5
Conservative	Boyd Elliott	970	15.9
Calverton First Independent	Bill Peet	777	12.7
Calverton First Independent	Tony Barton	664	10.9
Calverton First Independent	Grant Withers	576	9.5
Turnout		6,098	45.1
Labour gain from Independent			
Labour gain from Independent			
Labour gain from Independent			

=== Carlton ===
Carlton (3)
Party	Candidate	Votes	%
Labour	Nicki Brooks	1,363	20.0
Labour	Steve Ainley	1,357	19.9
Labour	Mark Glover	1,297	19.0
Conservative	Cheryl Clarke	793	11.6
Conservative	Richard Goodwin	755	11.1
Conservative	Wendy Golland	743	10.9
Liberal Democrats	Abigail Rhodes	186	2.7
Liberal Democrats	Philip Whitaker	174	2.6
Liberal Democrats	Michel Flor-Henry	154	2.3
Turnout		6,822	44.7
Labour gain from Conservative			
Labour gain from Conservative			
Labour gain from Conservative			

=== Carlton Hill ===
Carlton Hill (3)
Party	Candidate	Votes	%
Labour	Jim Creamer	1,378	21.6
Labour	Paul Feeney	1,334	20.9
Labour	Darrell Pulk	1,332	20.9
Conservative	Mark Butcher	686	10.7
Conservative	Tom Butcher	663	10.4
Conservative	Luke Warrington	553	8.7
Liberal Democrats	Graham Drewberry	159	2.5
Liberal Democrats	Matthew Newman	147	2.3
Liberal Democrats	Spiros Fafoutis	133	2.1
Turnout		6,385	41.8
Labour hold			
Labour hold			
Labour hold			

=== Daybrook ===
Daybrook (2)
Party	Candidate	Votes	%
Labour	Peter Barnes	919	33.8
Labour	Sandra Barnes	891	32.6
Conservative	Peter Mason-Kempster	383	14.1
Conservative	Hazel Wilson	351	12.9
Liberal Democrats	Amy Nash	91	3.4
Liberal Democrats	Nigel Blaylock	85	3.1
Turnout		2,720	38.8
Labour hold			
Labour hold			

=== Gedling ===
Gedling (3)
Party	Candidate	Votes	%
Labour	Jenny Hollingsworth	856	12.0
Labour	Krista Blair	855	12.0
Liberal Democrats	Gordon Tunnicliffe	788	11.0
Labour	Alexander Scroggie	759	10.6
Liberal Democrats	Marguerite Wright	724	10.1
Liberal Democrats	Maggie Dunkin	711	10.0
Conservative	Bernard Leaper	706	9.9
Conservative	Selim Catkin	677	9.5
Conservative	Helen Greensmith	677	9.5
Green	Jeannie Thompson	143	2.0
Green	Jim Norris	127	1.8
Green	Margret Vince	121	1.7
Turnout		7,144	47.7
Labour gain from Liberal Democrats			
Labour gain from Liberal Democrats			
Liberal Democrats hold			

=== Killisick ===
Killisick
Party	Candidate	Votes	%
Labour	Henry Wheeler	552	76.9
Independent	Harvey Maddock	166	23.1
Turnout		718	40.7
Labour gain from Independent			

=== Kingswell ===
Kingswell (2)
Party	Candidate	Votes	%
Conservative	Sarah Hewson	729	21.5
Labour	Paul Key	699	20.3
Conservative	Natalie Sharpe	672	19.5
Labour	Les Nourse	595	17.5
Independent	Mary Kempster	278	8.1
Independent	Paul Peet	235	6.8
Liberal Democrats	Margaret Swift	121	3.5
Liberal Democrats	Jensen Stansfield-Coynw	118	3.4
Turnout		3,447	48.2
Conservative hold			
Labour gain from Conservative			

=== Lambley ===
Lambley
Party	Candidate	Votes	%
Conservative	Roland Spencer	599	73.0
Labour	Patricia Osbaldiston	222	27.0
Turnout		821	47.7
Conservative hold			

=== Mapperley Plains ===
Mapperley Plains (3)
Party	Candidate	Votes	%
Conservative	Ged Clarke	1,283	17.6
Conservative	Carol Pepper	1,261	17.3
Conservative	John Parr	1,219	16.7
Labour	John Butterworth	995	13.7
Labour	Joy Knowles	983	13.5
Labour	Marion Welton	936	12.9
Liberal Democrats	Paul Buxton	212	2.9
Liberal Democrats	Neil King	210	2.9
Liberal Democrats	Max Beeken	188	2.6
Turnout		7,287	44.3
Conservative hold			
Conservative hold			
Conservative hold			

=== Netherfield and Colwick ===
Netherfield and Colwick (3)
Party	Candidate	Votes	%
Labour	John Clarke	1,087	21.0
Labour	Barbara Miller	1,070	20.6
Labour	Meredith Lawrence	1,052	20.3
Conservative	Allen Clarke	527	10.2
Conservative	Geoff Richardson	445	8.6
Conservative	Elliot Taylor	409	7.9
Liberal Democrats	Heather Stammers	165	3.2
Green	Jean Katimertzis	159	3.1
Liberal Democrats	Nora Crosland	137	2.6
Liberal Democrats	Susan Brownlee	136	2.6
Turnout		5,187	34.3
Labour hold			
Labour hold			
Labour hold			

=== Newstead ===
Newstead
Party	Candidate	Votes	%
Conservative	Patricia Andrews	433	56.0
Labour	John McCauley	340	44.0
Turnout		773	45.7
Conservative hold			

=== Phoenix ===
Phoenix (2)
Party	Candidate	Votes	%
Labour	Cheryl Hewlett	742	27.1
Labour	Ian Howarth	684	25.0
Liberal Democrats	Andrew Ellwood	680	24.8
Liberal Democrats	Richard Berry	636	23.2
Turnout		2,742	41.2
Labour gain from Liberal Democrats			
Labour gain from Liberal Democrats			

=== Porchester ===
Porchester (3)
Party	Candidate	Votes	%
Labour	Bob Collis	1,375	18.0
Labour	John Truscott	1,336	17.4
Labour	Muriel Weisz	1,279	16.7
Conservative	John Collin	1,040	13.6
Conservative	John Tanner	1,035	13.5
Conservative	Jenny Spencer	980	12.8
Liberal Democrats	Josephine James	235	3.1
Liberal Democrats	Raymond Poynter	199	2.6
Liberal Democrats	Christopher Pratt	181	2.4
Turnout		7,660	49.2
Labour gain from Conservative			
Labour gain from Conservative			
Labour gain from Conservative			

=== Ravenshead ===
Ravenshead (3)
Party	Candidate	Votes	%
Conservative	Christopher Barnfather	1,725	25.4
Conservative	Bruce Andrews	1,638	24.2
Conservative	Colin Powell	1,525	22.5
Labour	Carol Wright	711	10.5
Labour	John Kendrick	677	10.0
Labour	Paul Maguire	508	7.5
Turnout		6,784	52.5
Conservative hold			
Conservative hold			
Conservative hold			

=== St James ===
St James (2)
Party	Candidate	Votes	%
Labour	Kathryn Fox	605	20.1
Liberal Democrats	Tony Gillam	534	17.7
Labour	Steven Syme	504	16.7
Conservative	Julie Catkin	461	15.3
Liberal Democrats	Jason Stansfield	459	15.2
Conservative	James Faulconbridge	452	15.0
Turnout		3,015	47.6
Labour gain from Liberal Democrats			
Liberal Democrats hold			

=== St Mary's ===
St Mary's (3)
Party	Candidate	Votes	%
Labour	Pauline Allan	1,144	18.9
Labour	Michael Payne	1,136	18.8
Labour	Marje Paling	1,077	17.8
Conservative	Bob Tait	834	13.8
Conservative	Terry Pepper	827	13.7
Conservative	Mike Anthony	805	13.3
UKIP	Mark Brinsley-Day	228	3.8
Turnout		6,051	43.1
Labour gain from Conservative			
Labour gain from Conservative			
Labour gain from Conservative			

=== Valley ===
Valley (2)
Party	Candidate	Votes	%
Labour	Gary Gregory	546	22.1
Liberal Democrats	Paul Hughes	469	19.0
Liberal Democrats	Andrew Dunkin	463	18.8
Labour	Stewart Ragsdale	461	18.7
Conservative	Trevor Day	234	9.5
Conservative	Tanya Hinds	195	7.9
Independent	Deva Kumarasiri	55	2.2
Independent	Robert Dawson	44	1.8
Turnout		2,467	39.7
Labour gain from Independent			
Liberal Democrats hold			

=== Woodborough ===
Woodborough
Party	Candidate	Votes	%
Conservative	John Boot	658	77.9
Labour	Anne Hawkins	187	22.1
Turnout		845	56.6
Conservative hold			

=== Woodthorpe ===
Woodthorpe (3)
Party	Candidate	Votes	%
Conservative	Suzanne Prew-Smith	1,381	16.6
Conservative	Alan Bexon	1,315	15.8
Conservative	Richard Nicholson	1,292	15.5
Labour	Grahame Pope	1,242	14.9
Labour	Michael Towers	1,094	13.1
Labour	Peter Osbaldiston	1,089	13.1
Liberal Democrats	Andrew Swift	364	4.4
Liberal Democrats	Roger Patterson	292	3.5
Liberal Democrats	Martin Smalley	272	3.3
Turnout		8,341	53.3
Conservative hold			
Conservative hold			
Conservative hold			

== By-Elections between May 2011 – April 2015 ==
By-elections are called when a representative Councillor resigns or dies, so are unpredictable. A by-election is held to fill a political office that has become vacant between the scheduled elections.

=== Phoenix – 15 September 2011 ===
Phoenix By-Election 15 September 2011
Party	Candidate	Votes	%	±%
Liberal Democrats	Andrew Ellwood	566	49.2	+1.2
Labour	Allan Leadbeater	445	38.7	−13.3
Conservative	James Faulconbridge	98	8.5	New
UKIP	Lee Waters	42	3.7	New
Majority		121	10.5	N/A
Turnout		1,151		
Liberal Democrats gain from Labour		Swing		

=== Kingswell – 2 May 2013 ===
Kingswell By-Election 2 May 2013
Party	Candidate	Votes	%	±%
Labour	David Ellis	547	36.3	−1.2
Conservative	Michael Adams	483	32.0	−8.6
UKIP	Lee Waters	397	26.3	New
Liberal Democrats	Rhiann Stansfield-Coyne	80	5.3	−1.6
Majority		64	4.3	
Turnout		1,507	39.5	
Labour hold		Swing		

=== Gedling – 27 March 2014 ===
Gedling By-Election 27 March 2014
Party	Candidate	Votes	%	±%
Labour	Lynda Pearson	482	32.6	−1.7
Liberal Democrats	Maggie Dunkin	428	28.9	−2.7
UKIP	Claude-Francois Loi	337	22.8	New
Conservative	James Faulconbridge	233	15.7	−12.6
Majority		54	3.7	N/A
Turnout		1482		
Labour gain from Liberal Democrats		Swing		
