= Borough of Gedling =

Local government district in Nottinghamshire

Coordinates: 52.97531°N 1.07597°W

- Non-metropolitan district and borough
- Gedling
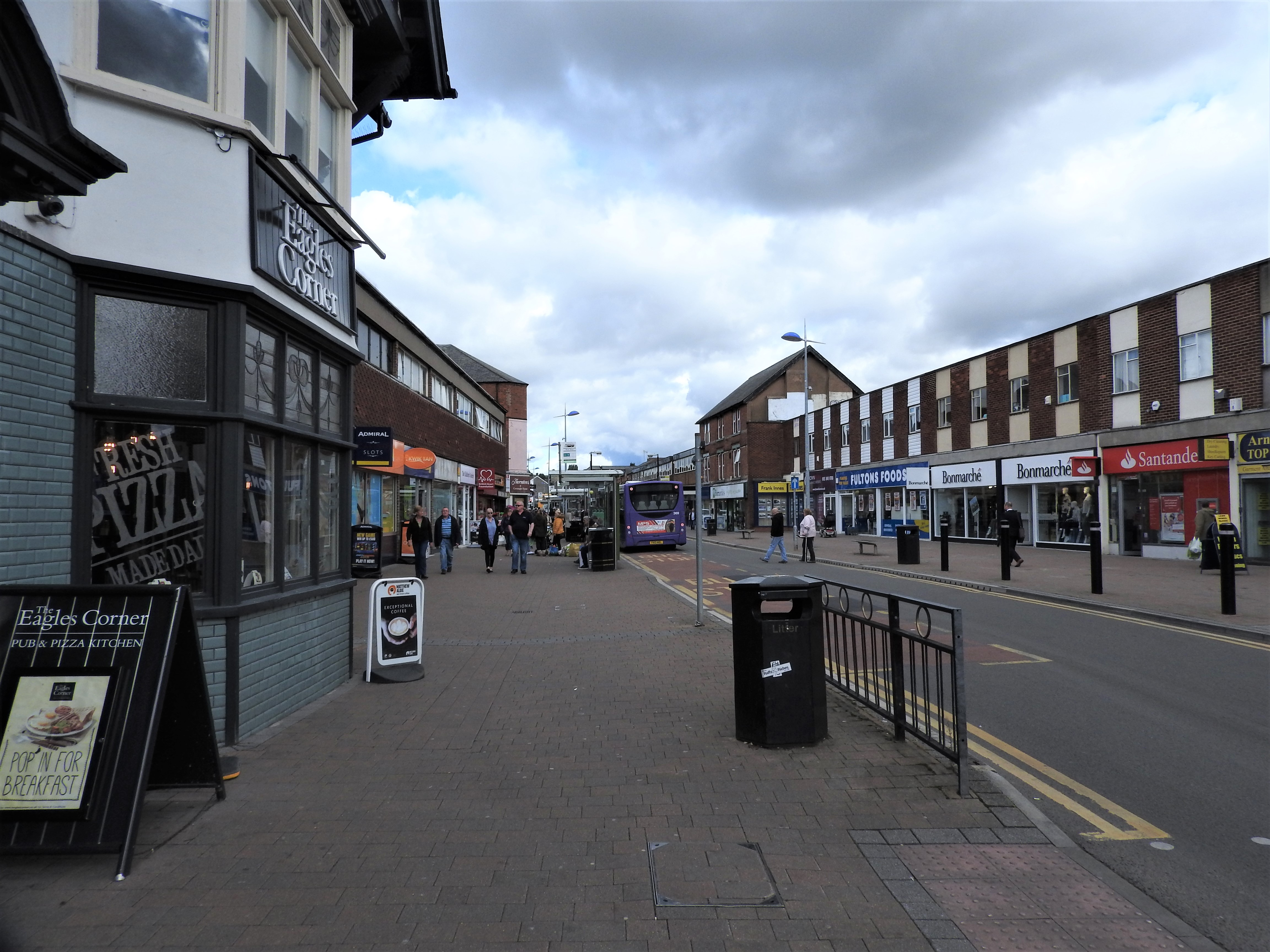
- Arnold, the largest settlement and the administrative centre of the district

- Coat of arms

- Shown within Nottinghamshire
- Sovereign state: United Kingdom
- Constituent country: England
- Region: East Midlands
- Administrative county: Nottinghamshire
- Administrative headquarters: Arnold

Government
  - Type: Gedling Borough Council
  - MPs: Michael Payne, Michelle Welsh

Area
  - Total: 46 sq mi (120 km^{2})
  - Rank: 179th

Population (2025)
  - Total: 121,105
  - Rank: Ranked 207th
  - Density: 2,600/sq mi (1,000/km^{2})

Ethnicity (2021)
  - Ethnic groups: List: 89.5% White; 3.9% Asian; 3.5% Mixed; 2.3% Black; 0.8% other

Religion (2021)
  - Religion: List: 50.4% no religion; 44.9% Christianity; 2.5% other; 2.2% Islam
- Time zone: UTC+0 (Greenwich Mean Time)
  - Summer (DST): UTC+1 (British Summer Time)
- ONS code: 37UE (ONS); E07000173 (GSS)

Gedling is a local government district with borough status in Nottinghamshire, England. The council is based in Arnold. The borough also includes Carlton and Netherfield along with various villages and rural areas to the north-east of Nottingham. The main built-up part of the borough around Arnold and Carlton forms part of the Nottingham Urban Area.

The neighbouring districts are Ashfield, Newark and Sherwood, Rushcliffe and Nottingham.

== History ==
The district was formed on 1 April 1974 under the Local Government Act 1972. The new district covered the whole area of two former districts and part of a third, which were all abolished at the same time:

- Arnold Urban District
- Basford Rural District (part, being the parishes of Bestwood Park, Burton Joyce, Calverton, Lambley, Linby, Newstead, Papplewick, Stoke Bardolph and Woodborough)
- Carlton Urban District

The new district was named after the old village of Gedling. The civil parish of Gedling had been abolished in 1935 and absorbed into the Carlton Urban District.

The new Gedling district was granted borough status from its creation, allowing the chair of the council to take the title of mayor.

Under current local government reorganisation plans, all district councils in Nottinghamshire, as well as the county council, will be abolished in 2028, with the district being split between a Nottinghamshire unitary authority and a Greater Nottingham unitary covering an area including and around Nottingham.

== Governance ==
Gedling Borough Council

Type
- Type: Non-metropolitan district

Leadership
- Mayor: Sandra Barnes, Labour since 20 May 2026
- Leader: John Clarke, Labour since 18 May 2011
- Chief Executive: Mike Hill since July 2020

Structure
- Seats: 41 councillors
- Graph of the party split among 41 seats.
- Political groups: Administration (24) Labour (24) Other parties (17) Conservative (9) Liberal Democrats (4) Independent (4)

Elections
- Voting system: First past the post
- Last election: 4 May 2023
- Next election: 6 May 2027

Meeting place
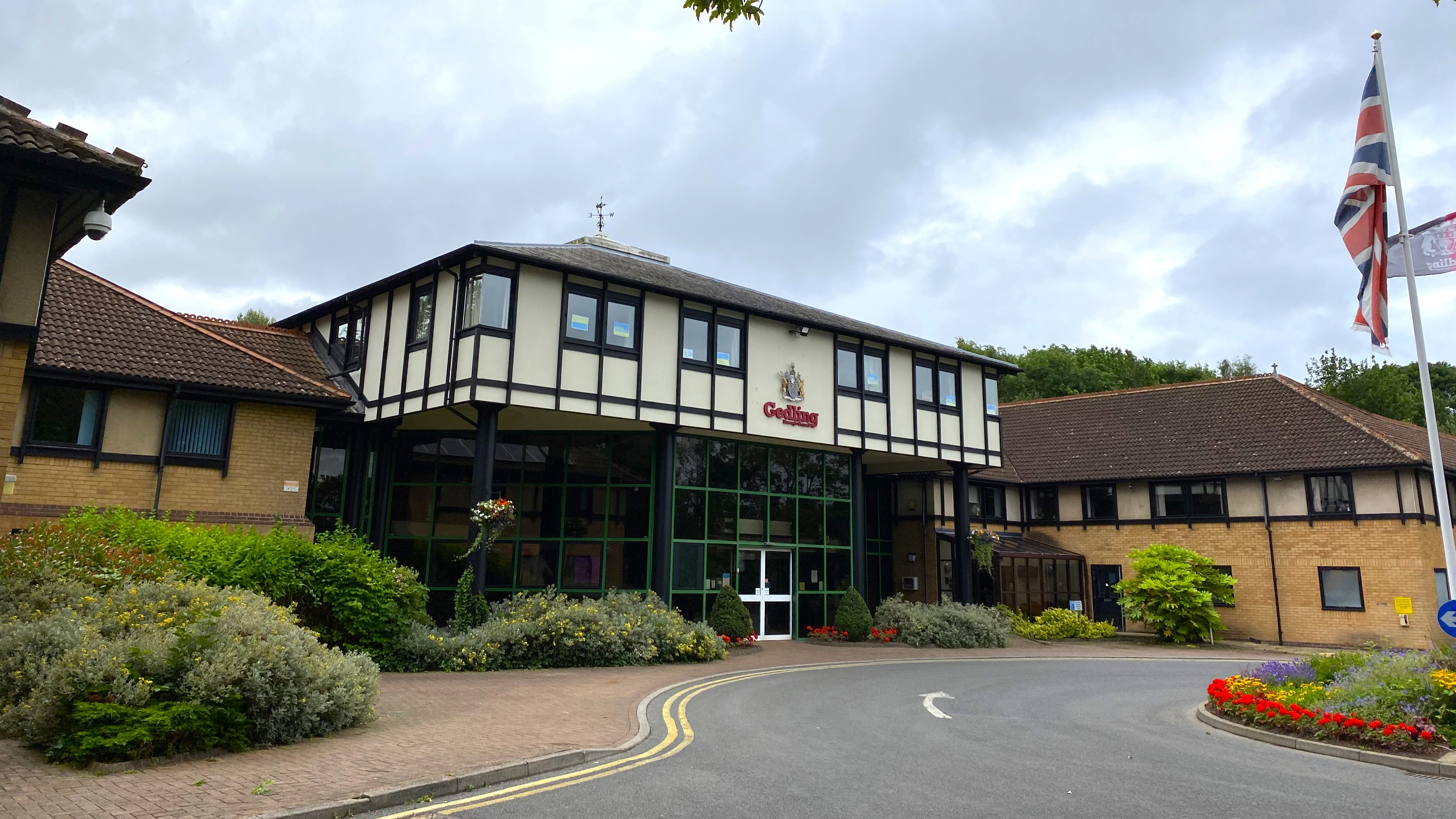
- Civic Centre, Arnot Hill Park, Arnold, Nottingham, NG5 6LU

Website
- www.gedling.gov.uk

Gedling Borough Council provides district-level services. County-level services are provided by Nottinghamshire County Council. Parts of the borough are also covered by civil parishes, which form a third tier of local government..

The borough has been a non-constituent member of the East Midlands Combined County Authority with a regional mayor as of May 2024.

=== Political control ===
The council has been under Labour majority control since 2011.

The first election to the council was held in 1973, initially operating as a shadow authority alongside the outgoing authorities until the new arrangements took effect on 1 April 1974. Political control of the council since 1974 has been as follows:

Party in control	Years
Conservative	1974–1995
Labour	1995–1999
Conservative	1999–2003
No overall control	2003–2007
Conservative	2007–2011
Labour	2011–present

=== Leadership ===
The role of mayor is largely ceremonial in Gedling. Political leadership is instead provided by the leader of the council. The leaders since 2002 have been:

Councillor	Party	From	To
Roland Spencer	Conservative	Jun 2002	May 2003
Ivan Gollop	Labour	2003	2004
Roland Spencer	Conservative	2004	2005
Ivan Gollop	Labour	11 May 2005	May 2006
Roland Spencer	Conservative	10 May 2006	May 2011
John Clarke	Labour	18 May 2011	

=== Composition ===
Following the 2023 election, and by-elections and changes of allegiance up to September 2026, the composition of the council was:

Party	Seats
Labour	24
Conservative	9
Liberal Democrats	4
Independent	4
Total	41

The next election is due in 2027.

=== Premises ===
The council is based at the Civic Centre in Arnot Hill Park. The building was purpose-built for the council in 1985 at a cost of £2.2 million. It was formally opened by Princess Anne on 1 November 1985.

== Elections ==
Since the last boundary changes in 2015 the council has comprised 41 councillors representing 19 wards, with each ward electing one, two or three councillors. Elections are held every four years.

=== Wards ===
The wards are:

- Bestwood St Albans
- Calverton
- Carlton
- Carlton Hill
- Cavendish
- Colwick
- Coppice
- Daybrook
- Dumbles
- Ernehale
- Gedling
- Netherfield
- Newstead Abbey
- Phoenix
- Plains
- Porchester
- Redhill
- Trent Valley
- Woodthorpe

=== Parliamentary ===
The borough is covered by two parliamentary constituencies. The more urban southern part of the borough adjoining Nottingham is in the Gedling constituency, which until 1983 was known as Carlton. The more rural northern part of the borough, including Calverton and Ravenshead, forms part of the Sherwood constituency.

== Parishes ==
Map of the Borough of Gedling

There are 13 civil parishes in the borough. The former Arnold Urban District and most of the former Carlton Urban District comprise an unparished area. The parish of Stoke Bardolph has a parish meeting rather than a parish council due to its small population.

- Bestwood Village
- Burton Joyce
- Calverton
- Colwick
- Deer Park
- Lambley
- Linby
- Newstead
- Papplewick
- Ravenshead
- St Albans
- Stoke Bardolph
- Woodborough

== Culture ==
The Bonington Theatre in Arnold is named after the landscape painter Richard Parkes Bonington.

The borough contains Newstead Abbey, a former Augustinian Priory. The building was converted into a house following the dissolution of the monasteries and was later the seat of the Byron family, including Lord Byron.

== Arms ==
Coat of arms of Borough of Gedling
Crest On a wreath of the colours issuant from a mural crown Or in front of two arrows in saltire points downwards a torch Sable enflamed Proper. Escutcheon Azure an oak tree fructed and eradicated Or on a chief lozengy Argent and Sable tree garbs of the second. Supporters On the dexter side a stag and on the sinister side a bear both Proper. Motto Omnibus Optimum (The Best For All)

== Freedom of the Borough ==
The following people and military units have received the Freedom of the Borough of Gedling.

=== Individuals ===
- Vernon, Lord Coaker: 17 June 2022.

=== Military units ===
- 2nd Battalion The Mercian Regiment: 20 October 2010.
