= List of civil parishes in Nottinghamshire =

This is a list of civil parishes in the ceremonial county of Nottinghamshire, England. There are 234 civil parishes in 8 districts.

== Ashfield ==
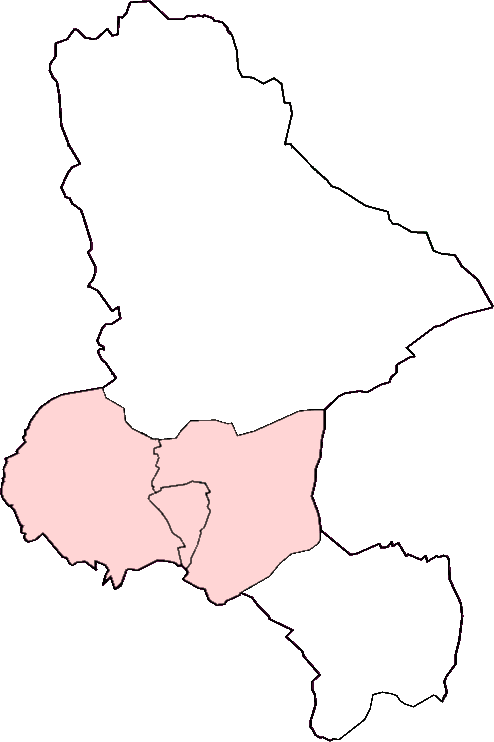

Three parishes. The former Hucknall Urban District, Kirkby in Ashfield Urban District and Sutton in Ashfield Urban District are unparished.

- Annesley ^{2}
- Felley ^{2}
- Selston ^{2}

== Bassetlaw ==

64 parishes. The former East Retford Municipal Borough and part of the former Worksop Municipal Borough are unparished.

- Askham ^{7}
- Babworth ^{7}
- Barnby Moor ^{7}
- Beckingham ^{7}
- Bevercotes ^{7}
- Blyth ^{21}
- Bole ^{7}
- Bothamsall ^{7}
- Carburton ^{21}
- Carlton in Lindrick ^{21}
- Clarborough and Welham ^{7}
- Clayworth ^{7}
- Clumber and Hardwick ^{20}
- Cottam ^{7}
- Darlton ^{7}
- Dunham-on-Trent ^{7}
- East Drayton ^{7}
- East Markham ^{7}
- Eaton ^{7}
- Elkesley ^{7}
- Everton ^{7}
- Fledborough ^{7}
- Gamston ^{7}
- Gringley on the Hill ^{7}
- Grove ^{7}
- Harworth Bircotes (town)^{21}
- Haughton ^{7}
- Hayton ^{7}
- Headon cum Upton ^{7}
- Hodsock ^{21}
- Laneham ^{7}
- Lound ^{7}
- Marnham ^{7}
- Mattersey ^{7}
- Misson ^{7}
- Misterton ^{7}
- Nether Langwith ^{21}
- Normanton on Trent ^{7}
- North and South Wheatley ^{7}
- North Leverton with Habblesthorpe ^{7}
- Norton, Cuckney, Holbeck and Welbeck ^{21}
- Ragnall ^{7}
- Rampton and Woodbeck ^{7}
- Ranskill ^{7}
- Rhodesia ^{20}
- Saundby ^{7}
- Scaftworth ^{7}
- Scrooby ^{7}
- Shireoaks ^{20}
- South Leverton ^{7}
- Stokeham ^{7}
- Sturton le Steeple ^{7}
- Styrrup with Oldcotes ^{21}
- Sutton ^{7}
- Torworth ^{7}
- Treswell ^{7}
- Tuxford (town)^{7}
- Walkeringham ^{7}
- Wallingwells ^{21}
- West Burton ^{7}
- West Drayton ^{7}
- West Markham ^{7}
- West Stockwith ^{7}
- Wiseton ^{7}

== Broxtowe ==

Nine parishes. Part of the former Beeston and Stapleford Urban District and Strelley are unparished.

- Awsworth ^{2}
- Brinsley ^{2}
- Cossall ^{2}
- Eastwood (town)^{8}
- Greasley ^{2}
- Kimberley (town)^{2}
- Nuthall ^{2}
- Stapleford (town)^{3}
- Trowell ^{2}

== Gedling ==
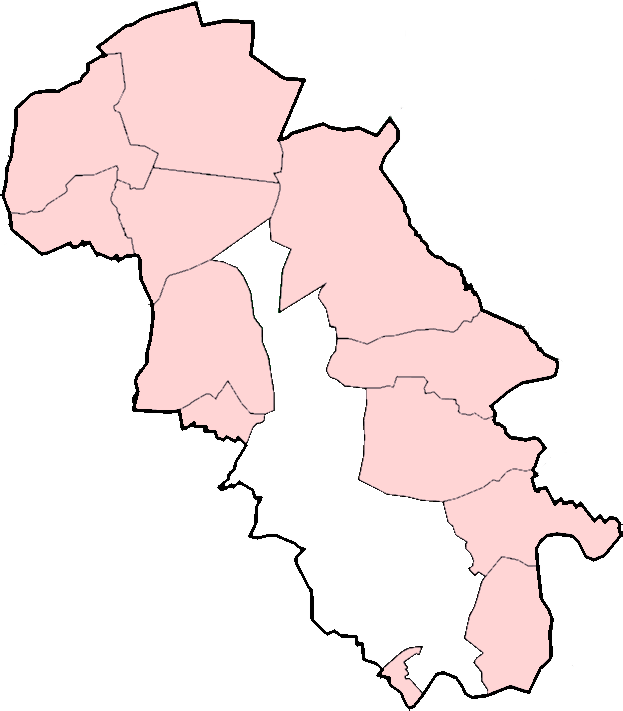

13 parishes. Part of the former Arnold Urban District and Carlton Urban District are unparished.

- Bestwood Village ^{2}
- Burton Joyce ^{2}
- Calverton ^{2}
- Colwick ^{5}
- Deer Park ^{2}
- Lambley ^{2}
- Linby ^{2}
- Newstead ^{2}
- Papplewick ^{2}
- Ravenshead ^{2} ^{16}
- St Albans ^{2}
- Stoke Bardolph ^{2}
- Woodborough ^{2}

== Mansfield ==
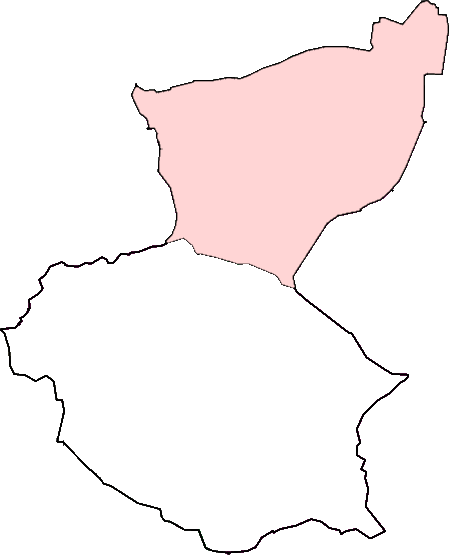

One parish. The former Mansfield Municipal Borough and Mansfield Woodhouse Urban District are unparished.

- Warsop ^{18}

== Newark and Sherwood ==

84 parishes. The whole of the district is parished.

- Alverton ^{14}
- Averham ^{16}
- Balderton ^{14}
- Barnby in the Willows ^{14}
- Bathley ^{16}
- Besthorpe ^{14}
- Bilsthorpe ^{16}
- Bleasby ^{16}
- Blidworth ^{16}
- Bulcote ^{16}
- Carlton on Trent ^{16}
- Caunton ^{16}
- Caythorpe ^{16}
- Clipstone ^{16}
- Coddington ^{14}
- Collingham ^{14}
- Cotham ^{14}
- Cromwell ^{16}
- Eakring ^{16}
- East Stoke ^{14}
- Edingley ^{16}
- Edwinstowe ^{16}
- Egmanton ^{16}
- Elston ^{14}
- Epperstone ^{16}
- Farndon ^{14}
- Farnsfield ^{16}
- Fernwood ^{14}
- Fiskerton cum Morton ^{16}
- Girton ^{14}
- Gonalston ^{16}
- Grassthorpe ^{16}
- Gunthorpe ^{16}
- Halam ^{16}
- Halloughton ^{16}
- Harby ^{14}
- Hawton ^{14}
- Hockerton ^{16}
- Holme ^{14}
- Hoveringham ^{16}
- Kelham ^{16}
- Kersall ^{16}
- Kilvington ^{14}
- Kings Clipstone
- Kirklington ^{16}
- Kirton ^{16}
- Kneesall ^{16}
- Langford ^{14}
- Laxton and Moorhouse ^{16}
- Lindhurst ^{16}
- Lowdham ^{16}
- Maplebeck ^{16}
- Meering ^{14}
- Newark (town)^{13}
- North Clifton ^{14}
- North Muskham ^{16}
- Norwell ^{16}
- Ollerton and Boughton (town)^{16}
- Ompton ^{16}
- Ossington ^{16}
- Oxton ^{16}
- Perlethorpe cum Budby ^{16}
- Rainworth ^{16}
- Rolleston ^{16}
- Rufford ^{16}
- South Clifton ^{14}
- South Muskham ^{16}
- South Scarle ^{14}
- Southwell (town)^{16}
- Spalford ^{14}
- Staunton ^{14}
- Staythorpe ^{16}
- Sutton-on-Trent ^{16}
- Syerston ^{14}
- Thorney ^{14}
- Thorpe ^{14}
- Thurgarton ^{16}
- Upton ^{16}
- Walesby ^{16}
- Wellow ^{16}
- Weston ^{16}
- Wigsley ^{14}
- Winkburn ^{16}
- Winthorpe ^{14}

== Nottingham ==
Nottingham-district

The former Nottingham County Borough is unparished.

== Rushcliffe ==

60 parishes. The former West Bridgford Urban District is unparished.

- Aslockton ^{4}
- Barton in Fabis ^{2}
- Bingham (town)^{4}
- Bradmore ^{2}
- Bunny ^{2}
- Car Colston ^{4}
- Clipston ^{4}
- Colston Bassett ^{4}
- Costock ^{2}
- Cotgrave (town)^{4}
- Cropwell Bishop ^{4}
- Cropwell Butler ^{4}
- East Bridgford ^{4}
- East Leake ^{2}
- Elton on the Hill ^{4}
- Flawborough ^{4}
- Flintham ^{4}
- Gamston ^{4}
- Gotham ^{2}
- Granby ^{4}
- Hawksworth ^{4}
- Hickling ^{4}
- Holme Pierrepont ^{4}
- Keyworth ^{4}
- Kingston on Soar ^{2}
- Kinoulton ^{4}
- Kneeton ^{4}
- Langar cum Barnstone ^{4}
- Newton ^{4}
- Normanton on Soar ^{2}
- Normanton on the Wolds ^{4}
- Orston ^{4}
- Owthorpe ^{4}
- Plumtree ^{4}
- Radcliffe on Trent ^{4}
- Ratcliffe-on-Soar ^{2}
- Rempstone ^{2}
- Ruddington ^{2}
- Saxondale ^{4}
- Scarrington ^{4}
- Screveton ^{4}
- Shelford ^{4}
- Shelton ^{4}
- Sibthorpe ^{4}
- Stanford on Soar ^{2}
- Stanton on the Wolds ^{4}
- Sutton Bonington ^{2}
- Thoroton ^{4}
- Thorpe in the Glebe ^{2}
- Thrumpton ^{2}
- Tithby ^{4}
- Tollerton ^{4}
- Upper Broughton ^{4}
- Upper Saxondale ^{4}
- West Leake ^{2}
- Whatton-in-the-Vale ^{4}
- Widmerpool ^{4}
- Willoughby on the Wolds ^{2}
- Wiverton Hall ^{4}
- Wysall ^{2}

== Notes ==
1. Formerly Arnold Urban District
2. Formerly Basford Rural District
3. Formerly Beeston and Stapleford Urban District
4. Formerly Bingham Rural District
5. Formerly Carlton Urban District
6. Formerly East Retford Municipal Borough
7. Formerly East Retford Rural District
8. Formerly Eastwood Urban District
9. Formerly Hucknall Urban District
10. Formerly Kirkby in Ashfield Urban District
11. Formerly Mansfield Municipal Borough
12. Formerly Mansfield Woodhouse Urban District
13. Formerly Newark Municipal Borough
14. Formerly Newark Rural District
15. Formerly Nottingham County Borough
16. Formerly Southwell Rural District
17. Formerly Sutton in Ashfield Urban District
18. Formerly Warsop Urban District
19. Formerly West Bridgford Urban District
20. Formerly Worksop Municipal Borough
21. Formerly Worksop Rural District

== See also ==
- List of civil parishes in England
