= First periodic review of Westminster constituencies =

1950s review of UK electoral boundaries

The first periodic review of Westminster constituencies was a review of constituency boundaries for the Westminster Parliament in the United Kingdom carried out by the boundary commissions created by the House of Commons (Redistribution of Seats) Act 1949. The commissions reported in 1954 and their recommendations took effect for the 1955 general election. Legal action over the procedure for such reviews resulted in the passage of the House of Commons (Redistribution of Seats) Act 1958.

== Summary of changes ==
Although the review was carried out only 5 years after the major overhaul of constituency boundaries enacted by the Representation of the People Act 1948 (taking effect for the 1950 general election), there were a number of significant changes, with the total number of seats increasing from 625 to 630. There were 36 new constituencies created and 31 abolished, resulting in a net increase of 5 constituencies which were all in England (506 to 511), with the number of constituencies in Wales (36), Scotland (71) and Northern Ireland (12) remaining the same.

There were changes to a further 137 constituencies involving the transfer of local authorities or wards/parishes therein. There were also minor changes to 42 constituencies which involved bringing the constituency boundaries in line with local authority boundaries which had been altered. The bulk of the changes affected the large cities outside London (Birmingham, Bradford, Bristol, Edinburgh, Glasgow, Leeds, Liverpool, Manchester and Sheffield). There were only a few marginal changes in Wales and no changes in Northern Ireland.

During the period 1951 to 1953, 29 Statutory Instruments, affecting 66 constituencies, had been passed under the provisions of the House of Commons (Redistribution of Seats) Act 1949 to bring boundaries in line with those of local authorities.

There was a considerable delay before the second periodic review was completed and approved by Parliament and this did not come into effect until the February 1974 general election. The boundaries and constituencies introduced by the First Review were therefore in use for the general elections of 1955, 1959, 1964, 1966 and 1970.

== List of constituencies created, abolished or altered ==
Source: Craig, F. W. S. (1972). Boundaries of Parliamentary Constituencies 1885-1972. Chichester: Political Reference Publications. ISBN 0-900178-09-4. Pages 49 to 116.

BC denotes a Borough Constituency; CC denotes a County Constituency.

=== England ===
County	Seats 1950-55	Created	Abolished	Major changes	Minor changes	Seats 1955-74
Bedfordshire	4				Bedford CC Mid Bedfordshire CC	4
Berkshire	6	Reading BC	Reading North BC Reading South BC	Newbury CC Wokingham CC		5
Buckinghamshire	5					5
Cambridgeshire	2					2
Cheshire	15	Nantwich CC		Crewe CC Knutsford CC Northwich CC		16
Cornwall	5					5
Cumberland	4					4
Derbyshire	10			South East Derbyshire CC Derby North BC Derby South BC		10
Devon	10			Plymouth, Devonport BC Plymouth, Sutton BC		10
Dorset	4					4
Durham	18			Jarrow CC (redesignated as a BC) Gateshead East BC Gateshead West BC		18
Essex	24	Chigwell CC South East Essex CC		Billericay CC Chelmsford CC Southend East BC Southend West BC Woodford BC		26
Gloucestershire	12	Stroud CC	Stroud and Thornbury CC	Cirencester and Tewksbury CC South Gloucestershire CC Bristol Central BC Bristol North East BC Bristol North West BC Bristol South BC Bristol South East BC Bristol West BC	Gloucester BC	12
Hampshire	13	Eastleigh CC		Basingstoke CC New Forest CC Petersfield CC Winchester CC Southampton, Itchen BC Southampton, Test BC	Portsmouth, Langstone BC Portsmouth South BC Portsmouth West BC	14
Herefordshire	2					2
Hertfordshire	7	East Hertfordshire CC		Barnet CC Hertford CC Hitchin CC St Albans CC		8
Huntingdonshire	1					1
Isle of Ely	1					1
Isle of Wight	1					1
Kent	18	Erith and Crayford BC		Chislehurst CC Gravesend CC Orpington CC Dartford BC (redesignated as a CC)	Rochester and Chatham BC	19
Lancashire	64	Blackburn BC Manchester, Openshaw BC	Blackburn East BC Blackburn West BC Droylesden BC Manchester, Clayton BC	Chorley CC Darwen CC Ormskirk CC Ashton-under-Lyne BC Bootle BC Crosby BC Liverpool, Edge Hill BC Liverpool, Exchange BC Liverpool, Garston BC Liverpool, Kirkdale BC Liverpool, Walton BC Liverpool, Wavertree BC Liverpool, West Derby BC Manchester, Ardwick BC Manchester, Cheetham BC Manchester, Exchange BC Manchester, Gorton BC Manchester, Withington BC Manchester, Wythenshawe BC	Huyton CC Newton CC Widnes CC Liverpool, Scotland BC Liverpool, Toxteth BC Oldham East BC Oldham West BC St Helens BC Warrington BC	62
Leicestershire	8			Harborough CC Leicester South East BC	Bosworth CC Loughborough CC	8
Lincolnshire (Parts of Holland)	1					1
Lincolnshire (Parts of Kesteven) and Rutlandshire	2					2
Lincolnshire (Parts of Lindsey)	6					6
London	43	Barons Court BC Fulham BC Hackney Central BC	Fulham East BC Fulham West BC Hammersmith South BC Hackney South BC	Bethnal Green BC Hammersmith North BC Stoke Newington and Hackney North BC	Woolwich East BC Woolwich West BC	42
Middlesex	28	Feltham BC		Spelthorne CC Harrow Central BC Harrow East BC Harrow West BC Heston and Isleworth BC		29
Norfolk	8					8
Northamptonshire	5					5
Northumberland	10			Newcastle upon Tyne Central BC Newcastle upon Tyne West BC		10
Nottinghamshire	10	Ashfield CC Nottingham North BC Nottingham West BC	Broxtowe CC Nottingham East BC Nottingham North West BC	Bassetlaw CC Mansfield CC Newark CC Rushcliffe CC Nottingham Central BC Nottingham South BC		10
Oxfordshire	3					3
Shropshire	4					4
Somerset	7					7
Staffordshire	18	Walsall North BC Walsall South BC	Walsall BC	Cannock CC Lichfield and Tamworth CC Wednesbury BC Wolverhampton North East BC Wolverhampton South West BC	Brierley Hill CC Bilston BC Rowley Regis and Tipton BC Stoke-on-Trent Central BC Stoke-on-Trent North BC Stoke-on-Trent South BC	19
Suffolk	5					5
Surrey	19	Croydon North East BC Croydon North West BC Croydon South BC Surbiton BC	Croydon East BC Croydon North BC Croydon West BC	Kingston upon Thames BC Wimbledon BC		20
Sussex (East)	7	Rye CC		Eastbourne CC East Grinstead CC Lewes CC Hastings BC	Brighton, Kemptown BC Brighton, Pavilion BC	8
Sussex (West)	4					4
Warwickshire	22	Meriden CC Birmingham, All Saints BC Birmingham, Selly Oak BC	Birmingham, Erdington BC Birmingham, King's Norton BC	Nuneaton CC Sutton Coldfield CC (redesignated as a BC) Birmingham, Aston BC Birmingham, Handsworth BC Birmingham, Ladywood BC Birmingham, Northfield BC Birmingham, Small Heath BC Birmingham, Sparkbrook BC Birmingham, Stechford BC Birmingham, Yardley BC		23
Westmorland	1					1
Wiltshire	5					5
Worcestershire	6				Dudley BC	6
Yorkshire (East Riding)	6	Haltemprice CC Howden CC Kingston upon Hull West BC	Beverley CC Kingston upon Hull, Haltemprice BC Kingston upon Hull Central BC	Bridlington BC Kingston upon Hull East BC Kingston upon Hull North BC		6
Yorkshire (North Riding)	6					6
Yorkshire (West Riding)	46	Bradford West BC Leeds East BC	Bradford Central BC Leeds Central BC Leeds North BC Sheffield, Neepsend BC	Colne Valley CC Hemsworth CC Penistone CC Bradford East BC Bradford North BC Bradford South BC Brighouse and Spenborough BC Dewsbury BC Huddersfield East BC Huddersfield West BC Leeds North East BC Leeds North West BC Leeds South East BC Leeds West BC Sheffield, Attercliffe BC Sheffield, Brightside BC Sheffield, Hallam BC Sheffield, Heeley BC Sheffield, Hillsborough BC Sheffield, Park BC		44

=== Wales ===
County	Seats 1950-55	Created	Abolished	Major changes	Minor changes	Seats 1955-74
Anglesey	1					1
Breconshire and Radnorshire	1					1
Caernarvonshire	2					2
Cardiganshire	1					1
Carmarthenshire	2				Carmarthen CC Llanelly CC	2
Denbighshire	2					2
Flintshire	2					2
Glamorganshire	16				Swansea East BC Swansea West BC	16
Merionethshire	1					1
Monmouthshire	6				Monmouth CC Newport BC	6
Montgomeryshire	1					1
Pembrokeshire	1					1

=== Scotland ===
County	Seats 1950-55	Created	Abolished	Major changes	Minor changes	Seats 1955-74
Aberdeenshire	4			Aberdeenshire East CC Aberdeenshire West CC	Aberdeen North BC Aberdeen South BC	4
Angus and Kincardineshire	4					4
Argyll	1					1
Ayrshire and Bute	5				Bute and North Ayrshire CC Central Ayrshire CC	5
Banffshire	1					1
Berwickshire and East Lothian	1					1
Caithness and Sutherland	1					1
Dumfriesshire	1					1
Dunbartonshire	2					2
Fife	4					4
Inverness-shire and Ross and Cromarty	3					3
Kirkcudbrightshire and Wigtownshire	1					1
Lanarkshire	22	Glasgow, Craigton BC Glasgow, Provan BC	Glasgow, Camlachie BC Glasgow, Tradeston BC	Glasgow, Bridgeton BC Glasgow Central BC Glasgow, Gorbals BC Glasgow, Govan BC Glasgow, Hillhead BC Glasgow, Kelvingrove BC Glasgow, Pollok BC Glasgow, Scotstoun BC Glasgow, Springburn BC Glasgow, Woodside BC		22
Midlothian	7	Midlothian CC		Edinburgh Central BC Edinburgh North BC Edinburgh, Pentlands BC Edinburgh West BC	Edinburgh East BC	8
Midlothian and Peeblesshire	1		Midlothian and Peebles CC			-
Moray and Nairnshire	1					1
Orkney and Shetland	1					1
Perthshire and Kinross-shire	2					2
Renfrewshire	4					4
Roxburghshire and Selkirkshire	1		Roxburgh and Selkirk CC			-
Roxburghshire, Selkirkshire and Peeblesshire	-	Roxburgh, Selkirk and Peebles CC				1
Stirlingshire and Clackmannanshire	3				West Stirlingshire CC Stirling and Falkirk Burghs BC	3
West Lothian	1					1

=== Northern Ireland ===
County	Seats 1950-55	Created	Abolished	Major changes	Minor changes	Seats 1955-74
Antrim	6					6
Armagh	1					1
Down	2					2
Fermanagh and Tyrone	2					2
Londonderry	1					1

== Details of major changes ==
Abbreviations

BC denotes a Borough Constituency; CC denotes a County Constituency.

CB - County borough; MB - Metropolitan borough; UD - Urban district; RD - Rural district

=== Berkshire (minus 1 seat, boundary changes) ===
- Reading BC created by the merger of the majority of the two abolished seats of Reading North BC and Reading South BC. The Tilehurst ward was transferred from Reading North to Newbury CC, the East ward from Reading South to Wokingham CC.

=== Cheshire (plus 1 seat, boundary changes) ===
- Nantwich CC created, comprising Nantwich UD and the bulk of Nantwich RD, transferred from Crewe CC; and Middlewich UD, Winsford UD, the southern part of Tarvin RD and a small part of Northwich RD, transferred from Northwich CC.
- Alsager UD and Sandbach UD transferred from Knutsford CC to Crewe.

=== Derbyshire (boundary changes) ===
The parishes of Chaddesden and Littleover in Shardlow RD were transferred from South-East Derbyshire CC to Derby North BC and Derby South BC respectively.

=== Devon (boundary changes) ===
- The Plymouth CB wards of Peverell, Tamerton and Trelawney were transferred from Plymouth, Devonport BC to Plymouth, Sutton BC in exchange for the wards of Drake and St Andrew.

=== Durham (boundary changes) ===
- The Gateshead CB wards of East-Central and North-East were transferred from Gateshead East BC to Gateshead West BC.
- Felling UD was transferred from Jarrow CC (now redesignated as a BC) to Gateshead East.

=== East Sussex (plus 1 seat, boundary changes) ===
- Rye CC was re-established, comprising Rye MB and parts of Battle RD transferred from Hastings BC; Bexhill MB and parts of Hailsham RD from Eastbourne CC, further parts of Hailsham RD from Lewes CC; and remaining parts of Battle RD from East Grinstead CC.
- Parts of Hailsham RD were also transferred from Lewes to Eastbourne.

=== Essex (plus 2 seats, boundary changes) ===
- Woodford BC was divided in two, retaining Wanstead and Woodford MB, with Chigwell UD forming the bulk of the new seat of Chigwell CC, which also included Ongar RD, transferred from Chelmsford CC.
- South East Essex CC was re-established, comprising the three urban districts of Benfleet, Canvey Island and Rayleigh, which were previously part of Billericay CC, together with the Rochford RD, transferred from Southend East BC.
- Billericay was reconfigured, retaining Billericay UD and gaining Brentwood UD, which was transferred from Romford BC.
- Parts of Southend West BC transferred to Southend East.

=== Gloucestershire (seat and boundary changes) ===
- Thornbury RD was transferred from Stroud and Thornbury CC to South Gloucestershire CC. Consequently, Stroud and Thornbury was abolished and the seat of Stroud CC was re-established.
- Tetbury RD was transferred from Cirencester and Tewkesbury CC to Stroud.
- Thornbury RD was transferred from Stroud to South Gloucestershire CC.
- Kingswood UD and Mangotsfield UD were transferred from South Gloucestershire to Bristol North East BC and Bristol South East BC respectively.
- The boundaries of the six constituencies in Bristol were redrawn following a redistribution of wards in Bristol CB. Bristol South East lost parts to Bristol South BC (Hengrove ward), which in turn lost parts to Bristol Central BC (Windmill Hill ward); and Bristol North West BC lost parts to Bristol West BC (Durdham ward).

=== Hampshire (plus 1 seat, boundary changes) ===
- Eastleigh CC created, based on Eastleigh MB which, along with parts of Romsey and Stockbridge RD, had previously been part of Winchester CC. Also included the parts of the Winchester RD which had been in Petersfield CC (area between Southampton and the River Hamble including Netley and West End) and part of New Forest RD, including Totton, which was transferred from New Forest CC.
- The parts of Romsey and Stockbridge RD in Basingstoke CC were transferred to Winchester.
- Changes to the boundaries of the two Southampton seats due to a redistribution of wards in the Southampton CB, including the transfer of Portswood ward from Southampton, Itchen BC to Southampton, Test BC.

=== Hertfordshire (plus 1 seat, boundary changes) ===
- East Hertfordshire CC created, comprising the bulk of the existing constituency of Hertford CC. Part of Braughing RD was transferred from Hitchin CC.
- Major changes to the constituency of Hertford with only Hertford MB and the part of Hertford RD retained. Welwyn Garden City UD and Welwyn RD were transferred from St Albans CC; Hatfield RD from Barnet CC; and the remainder of Hertford RD from Hitchin.

=== Kent (plus 1 seat, boundary changes) ===
- Dartford BC was divided in two with the majority of the seat, comprising the Erith MB and Crayford UD forming Erith and Crayford BC. Dartford retained Dartford MB and gained Swanscombe UD from Gravesend CC and the Dartford RD partly from Chislehurst CC and partly from Orpington CC. It was redesignated as a County Constituency.

=== Lancashire (minus 2 seats, seat and boundary changes) ===
- Blackburn BC was created by the merger of the abolished seat of Blackburn East BC and parts of the abolished seat of Blackburn West BC. Remaining (western) parts of Blackburn West were transferred to Darwen CC.
- Withnell UD was transferred back from Darwen to Chorley CC.
- Droylesden BC was abolished and split up as follows: Droylesden UD to Ashton-under-Lyne BC; Audenshaw UD and Denton UD to Manchester, Gorton BC; and Failsworth UD to the new constituency of Manchester, Openshaw BC.
- Manchester, Clayton BC was abolished and split up as follows: Miles Platting to Manchester, Cheetham BC; Beswick to Manchester, Exchange BC; and Bradford and Newton Heath to the new constituency of Manchester, Openshaw.
- Other changes following a redistribution of wards in Manchester CB included the transfer of Rusholme from Manchester, Withington BC to Manchester, Ardwick BC; New Cross ward transferred from Manchester, Ardwick to Manchester, Exchange in exchange for St Luke's ward; Levenshulme from Manchester, Gorton BC to Manchester, Withington BC; Openshaw from Manchester, Gorton to the new constituency of Manchester, Openshaw; and Barlow Moor from Manchester, Wythenshawe BC to Manchester, Withington.
- Changes following a redistribution of wards in Liverpool CB included the transfer of West Wavertree from Liverpool, Wavertree BC to Liverpool, Edge Hill BC; Low Hill from Liverpool, Edge Hill to Liverpool, Exchange BC; Childwall from Liverpool, Garston BC to Liverpool, Wavertree; and Tuebrook from Liverpool, West Derby BC to Liverpool, Kirkdale BC.
- The parish of Aintree was transferred back from Liverpool, Walton BC to Ormskirk CC.
- Litherland UD was transferred from Bootle BC to Crosby CC.

=== Leicestershire (boundary change) ===
- Oadby UD transferred from Harborough CC to Leicester South-East BC.

=== London (minus 1 seat, seat and boundary changes) ===
- Barons Court BC formed, comprising southern parts of the abolished seat of Hammersmith South BC (Broadway, Brook Green, Grove and Ravenscourt wards) and northern parts of the abolished seats of Fulham East BC (Barons Court and Lillie wards) and Fulham West BC (Margravine ward).
- Fulham BC re-established, comprising the remaining parts of the abolished seats of Fulham East (Sands End and Walham wards) and Fulham West (Hurlingham, Munster and Town wards).
- Hammersmith North BC gained the Addison, Olympia, and St Stephen's wards from the abolished seat of Hammersmith South.
- Hackney Central BC re-established, comprising the abolished seat of Hackney South BC, excluding southern parts which were transferred to Bethnal Green BC, together with south-eastern parts transferred from Stoke Newington and Hackney North BC.

=== Middlesex (plus 1 seat, boundary changes) ===
- Feltham BC created, comprising Feltham UD, transferred from Spelthorne CC, and the westernmost part of Heston and Isleworth UD (Cranford and Hounslow Heath wards), transferred from Heston and Isleworth BC.
- Kenton ward transferred from Harrow East BC to Harrow Central BC and Headstone ward from Harrow Central to Harrow West BC.

=== Northumberland (boundary change) ===
- Benwell ward transferred from Newcastle upon Tyne West BC to Newcastle upon Tyne Central BC.

=== Nottinghamshire (seat and boundary changes) ===
- Major changes with only Carlton CC remaining unchanged.
- Ashfield CC created from parts of the abolished seat of Broxtowe CC (Eastwood UD, Kirkby-in-Ashfield UD and parts of Basford RD - including Selston), together with Sutton-in-Ashfield UD, transferred from Mansfield CC.
- Remaining areas of the abolished seat of Broxtowe transferred to Rushcliffe CC (further parts of Basford RD - area to the west of Nottingham, including Greasley and Kimberley) and the new seat of Nottingham North BC (Hucknall UD).
- Warsop UD transferred from Bassetlaw CC to Mansfield.
- Mansfield Woodhouse UD transferred from Newark CC to Mansfield.
- West Bridgford UD transferred from Rushcliffe to Nottingham South BC.
- Nottingham East BC abolished. Byron and Mapperley wards included in the new constituency of Nottingham North. Manvers ward transferred to Nottingham South and St Ann's ward back to Nottingham Central BC.
- Nottingham North West BC abolished. Broxtowe and Wollaton wards included in the new constituency of Nottingham West BC; St Albans ward in the new constituency of Nottingham North.
- Castle ward transferred from Nottingham South to the new seat of Nottingham West.

=== Staffordshire (plus 1 seat, boundary changes) ===
- Walsall BC abolished and replaced by Walsall North BC and Walsall South BC. Walsall North also included Brownhills UD, transferred from Cannock CC. Walsall South also included Aldridge UD, transferred from Lichfield and Tamworth CC.
- Wednesfield UD transferred from Wednesbury BC to Cannock.
- Park Ward transferred from Wolverhampton North East BC to Wolverhampton South West BC.

=== Surrey (plus 1 seat, boundary changes) ===
- Kingston upon Thames BC divided in two, with Surbiton MB forming the new seat of Surbiton BC. Kingston-upon-Thames retained Kingston upon Thames MB and gained Malden and Coombe MB from Wimbledon BC.
- The constituencies of Croydon East BC, Croydon North BC and Croydon West BC were replaced by the corresponding seats of Croydon North East BC, Croydon North West BC and Croydon South BC, with the following exceptions: Addington ward in Croydon East was included in Croydon South; Thornton Heath ward in Croydon North was included in Croydon North East; and Whitehorse Manor ward in Croydon West was included in Croydon North West.

=== Warwickshire (plus 1 seat, boundary changes) ===
- Major changes to the 13 constituencies within Birmingham CB, with only Birmingham, Edgbaston BC and Birmingham, Perry Barr BC remaining unchanged.
- Birmingham, Erdington BC abolished, with the Erdington ward being transferred to Sutton Coldfield CC (which was redesignated as Borough Constituency) and the remaining wards being included in the re-constituted seat of Birmingham, Aston BC.
- Birmingham, King's Norton BC abolished, with its three wards (Brandwood, King's Norton, and Moseley and King's Heath) being distributed to three different constituencies.
- Birmingham, All Saints BC created (All Saints', Rotton Park and Soho wards).
- Birmingham, Selly Oak BC created (Balsall Heath, Moseley and King's Heath, and Selly Oak wards).
- Birmingham, Aston BC gained Gravelly Hill and Stockland Green wards and lost Lozells and St Paul's wards (retaining Aston ward).
- Birmingham, Hall Green BC gained Brandwood ward and lost Sparkhill ward (retaining Hall Green and Springfield wards).
- Birmingham, Handsworth BC gained Lozells ward and lost Soho ward (retaining Handsworth and Sandwell wards).
- Birmingham, Ladywood BC gained Duddeston and St Paul's wards and lost All Saints' and Rotton Park wards (retaining Ladywood ward).
- Birmingham, Northfield BC gained King's Norton ward and lost Selly Oak ward (retaining Northfield and Weoley wards).
- Birmingham, Small Heath BC gained Deritend ward and lost Duddeston ward (retaining Saltley and Small Heath wards).
- Birmingham, Sparkbrook BC gained Fox Hollies and Sparkhill wards and lost Balsall Heath and Deritend wards (retaining Sparkbrook ward).
- Birmingham, Stechford BC lost Sheldon ward (retaining Stechford and Washwood Heath wards).
- Birmingham, Yardley BC gained Sheldon ward and lost Fox Hollies ward (retaining Acock's Green and Yardley wards).
- Meriden CC created, comprising Meriden RD and Tamworth RD, transferred from Sutton Coldfield, and Atherstone RD, transferred from Nuneaton CC.

=== Yorkshire, East Riding (seat and boundary changes) ===
- Kingston-upon-Hull, Haltemprice BC reconstituted as Haltemprice CC. The two wards of Kingston-Upon-Hull CB (Pickering and St Andrew's) were included in the new constituency of Kingston-upon-Hull West BC.
- Kingston-Upon-Hull, Central BC abolished. Albert, Coltman, North Newington and South Newington wards included in the new seat of Kingston-upon-Hull West; East Central and Myton wards transferred to Kingston-upon-Hull East BC; Botanic, Paragon and West Central wards transferred to Kingston-upon-Hull North BC.
- Beverley CC abolished. Beverley MB and Beverley RD transferred to Haltemprice; remaining parts formed the basis of the new constituency of Howden CC, which also included Driffield UD and Driffield RD, transferred from Bridlington CC.

=== Yorkshire, West Riding (minus 2 seats, boundary changes) ===
- Bradford Central BC abolished. Bradford Moor and North East wards transferred to Bradford North BC; Exchange and South wards to Bradford East BC, and Manningham ward to the new constituency of Bradford West BC.
- The new seat of Bradford West also included Allerton and Heaton wards, transferred from Bradford North BC, and Great Horton and Thornton wards from Bradford South BC.
- North Bierley East and West Bowling wards transferred from Bradford East to Bradford South, in exchange for Listerhills ward.
- Bradford South also gained Queensbury and Shelf UD from Brighouse and Spenborough BC.
- Hecknondwike UD transferred from Dewsbury BC to Brighouse and Spenborough.
- Leeds Central BC abolished. Most of the constituency included in the revised seat of Leeds South East BC, with Wellington ward transferred to Leeds West BC.
- Leeds East BC re-established. Formed from the majority of the existing seat of Leeds South East (Cross Gates, Halton and Osmondthorpe wards), together with parts of Leeds North East BC (Burmantofts and Harehills wards).
- Leeds North BC abolished. Most of the constituency was included in the revised seat of Leeds North East, with Moortown ward transferred to Leeds North West BC.
- Leeds North East substantially revised, retaining only the Potternewton ward, now combined with the wards which had formed the majority of the abolished constituency of Leeds North. Burmantofts and Harehills wards included in Leeds East and Richmond Hill ward included in the revised constituency of Leeds South East.
- Leeds North East substantially revised, retaining only the East Hunslet ward, now combined with Richmond Hill ward, transferred from Leeds North East, and wards which had formed the majority of the abolished constituency of Leeds Central. Cross Gates, Halton and Osmondthorpe wards included in the new constituency of Leeds East.
- Denby Dale UD transferred from Penistone CC to Colne Valley CC.
- Kirkburton UD transferred from Colne Valley to Huddersfield BC.
- Royston UD transferred from Hemsworth CC to Wakefield BC.
- Sheffield, Neepsend BC abolished. Northern parts transferred to Sheffield, Brightside BC; south-western parts to Sheffield, Hillsborough BC; and south-eastern parts to Sheffield, Park BC.
- Other changes due to redistribution of wards within Sheffield CB, including Tinsley ward from Sheffield Brightside to Sheffield, Attercliffe BC; Crookesmoor ward from Sheffield, Hillsborough to Sheffield, Hallam BC; and Sharrow ward from Sheffield, Park to Sheffield, Heeley BC.

=== Aberdeenshire (boundary change) ===
- The Burgh and District of Huntley transferred from East Aberdeenshire CC to West Aberdeenshire CC.

=== Lanarkshire (seat and boundary changes) ===
- Major changes to the 15 constituencies within the City of Glasgow with only Glasgow, Cathcart BC, Glasgow, Maryhill BC and Glasgow, Shettleston BC remaining unchanged.
- Glasgow, Camlachie BC abolished. The bulk of the seat (Dennistoun and Provan wards) formed the new constituency of Glasgow, Provan BC. The part of the Mile-End ward transferred to Glasgow, Bridgeton BC.
- Glasgow, Tradeston BC abolished and absorbed into Glasgow, Govan BC, with the exception of part of the Kingston ward which was transferred to Glasgow, Gorbals BC.
- Glasgow, Craigton BC formed, comprising southern parts of Glasgow, Govan (Craigton ward and part of the Fairfield ward) and part of the Pollokshields ward previously in Glasgow, Pollok BC.
- As a consequence of the above changes to Glasgow, Govan, this constituency was completely redrawn, with only part of the Fairfield ward and the part of the Govan ward retained.
- Glasgow Central BC gained Cowscaddens wards from Glasgow, Springburn BC and lost part of Exchange ward to Glasgow, Kelvingrove BC.
- Glasgow, Hillhead BC gained part of the Whiteinch ward from Glasgow, Scotstoun BC and lost the part of the Partick East ward to Glasgow, Woodside BC.

=== Midlothian (boundary changes) ===
- Part of Gorgie-Dalry ward transferred from Edinburgh, Pentlands BC to Edinburgh Central BC.
- Part of St Bernard's ward transferred from Edinburgh West BC to Edinburgh North BC.

=== Midlothian, Peeblesshire, Roxburghshire and Selkirkshire (seat and boundary changes) ===
- The constituencies of Midlothian and Peebles CC and Roxburgh and Selkirk CC abolished as a result of the transfer of the county of Peeblesshire from the latter to the former, creating the two new constituencies of Midlothian CC and Roxburgh, Selkirk and Peebles CC.
