= Bassetlaw District Council elections =

Local government elections in Nottinghamshire, England

Bassetlaw District Council elections are held every four years. Prior to 2015, elections were generally held three years out of every four, with a third of the council being elected each time. Bassetlaw District Council is the local authority for the non-metropolitan district of Bassetlaw in Nottinghamshire, England. Since the last boundary changes in 2002, 48 councillors have been elected from 25 wards.

== Council elections ==
Year	Party in control	Turnout	SEATS					VOTE %					Notes
Year	Party in control	Turnout	Lab	Con	LD	Ind	Oth	Lab	Con	LD	Ind	Oth	Notes
1973	Labour	48.1%	29	11	0	11		43.9%	24.4%	0.0%	27.8%	3.8%	
1976	No overall control	47.3%	18	24	0	9		31.9%	37.8%	5.9%	17.6%	6.8%	
1979	Labour	76.9%	29	17	0	4		46.6%	37.3%	5.5%	8.5%	2.1%	New ward boundaries
1980	Labour	43.2%	31	15	0	4		53.7%	30.6%	4.7%	9.4%	1.7%	
1982	Labour	40.5%	28	14	1	7		37.1%	34.9%	23.9%	4.0%	0.0%	
1983	Labour	45.4%	27	19	1	3		46.0%	37.5%	13.6%	2.9%	0.0%	
1984	Labour	46.3%	26	17	0	7		52.3%	36.6%	9.8%	0.9%	0.4%	
1986	Labour	43.8%	27	19	0	4		49.2%	33.3%	11.8%	2.2%	3.5%	
1987	Labour	48.1%	27	18	0	1		45.8%	33.2%	14.4%	3.7%	2.9%	
1988	Labour	42.1%	26	19	0	5		55.8%	35.9%	4.4%	0.6%	3.4%	
1990	Labour	50.2%	29	15	1	5		61.6%	27.3%	6.8%	3.4%	0.9%	
1991	Labour	42.2%	29	15	1	5		51.4%	27.6%	7.7%	11.7%	1.6%	
1992	Labour	36.6%	30	17	1	2		44.9%	43.3%	6.6%	5.2%	0.0%	
1994	Labour	39.6%	30	16	2	2		59.1%	23.5%	9.9%	7.6%	0.0%	
1995	Labour	35.2%	33	12	2	3		62.1%	25.1%	6.4%	3.4%	3.0%	
1996	Labour	29.9%	34	6	3	5		59.1%	22.5%	5.9%	12.4%	0.0%	
1998	Labour	25.7%	35	8	3	4		54.1%	35.4%	8.6%	0.0%	2.0%	
1999	Labour	26.3%	32	12	3	3		50.3%	34.9%	8.4%	3.6%	2.8%	
2000	Labour	25.8%	31	14	3	2		44.6%	41.8%	10.1%	2.5%	1.0%	
2002	Labour	29.7%	28	16	3	1		41.1%	40.0%	8.3%	7.6%	3.0%	New ward boundaries
2003	Labour	27.3%	25	19	2	2		38.3%	40.1%	6.9%	11.8%	2.9%	
2004	No overall control	42.1%	18	24	1	5		42.2%	40.9%	4.5%	12.4%	-	
2006	Conservative	40.4%	14	28	1	5		46.3%	46.4%	-	6.5%	0.8%	
2007	Conservative	32.1%	16	27	0	5		45.9%	46.8%	0.7%	6.6%	-	
2008	Conservative	32.3%	16	30	0	2		39.9%	47.9%	-	11.1%	1.2%	
2010	Conservative	62.1%	25	20	0	3		55.4%	36.5%	2.1%	5.3%	0.7%	
2011	Labour	42.0%	27	18	0	3		62.7%	34.0%	1.2%	2.1%	-	
2012	Labour	32.2%	34	11	0	3		65.8%	29.1%	1.3%	3.7%	-	
2014	Labour	32.6%	35	10	0	3		49.8%	19.5%	1.5%	2.9%	26.3%	
2015	Labour	63.7%	33	12	0	3	0	41.1%	33.8%	1.4%	4.0%	19.7%	Change to all-out elections
2019	Labour	30.0%	37	5	1	5	0	45.4%	29.0%	4.7%	13.0%	8.0%	
2023	Labour	31.5%	38	8	0	2	0	47.1%	35.5%	4.0%	9.5%	3.9%	

== District result maps ==
2002 results map

2003 results map

2004 results map

2006 results map

2007 results map

2008 results map

2010 results map

2011 results map

2012 results map

2014 results map

2015 results map

2019 results map

2023 results map

== By-elections ==
=== 1995-1999 ===
East Retford East By-Election 30 July 1998
Party	Candidate	Votes	%	±%
Conservative	Mike Quigley	788	54.6	+5.1
Labour	Susan Shaw	492	34.1	−5.3
Liberal Democrats	Elizabeth Dobbie	163	11.3	+0.2
Majority		296	20.5	
Turnout		1,443	24.8	
Conservative gain from Labour		Swing		

=== 2003-2007 ===
Sutton By-Election 18 September 2003
Party	Candidate	Votes	%	±%
Conservative		335	87.5	+58.0
Labour		48	12.5	+12.5
Majority		287	75.0	
Turnout		383	24.0	
Conservative gain from Liberal Democrats		Swing		

=== 2007-2011 ===
Worksop South By-Election 16 September 2010
Party	Candidate	Votes	%	±%
Labour	Sylvia May	815	51.98	+4.22
Conservative	Alec Thorpe	669	42.67	−10.59
Liberal Democrats	Leon Maurice Duveen	84	5.36	+5.36
Turnout		1,568	28.5	

Harworth By-Election 21 October 2010
Party	Candidate	Votes	%	±%
Labour	Gloria June Evans	1,345	82.31	
Conservative	Tracey Lee Taylor	182	11.14	
Independent	Richard Vernon Bennett	68	4.16	
Liberal Democrats	Mark Peter Hunter	39	2.39	
Turnout		1,634	27.53	

Worksop North East By-Election 10 February 2011
Party	Candidate	Votes	%	±%
Labour	John William Henry Anderton	1,198	74.04	
Conservative	Barry Albert Bowles	317	19.59	
Independent	Geoffrey Ernest Coe	75	4.64	
Liberal Democrats	Mark Peter Hunter	28	1.73	
Turnout		1,618	32.09	

=== 2015-2019 ===
Worksop South East By-Election 22 March 2018
Party	Candidate	Votes	%	±%
Labour	Clayton Tindle	1,004	77.3	+21.1
Conservative	Lewis Antony Stanniland	197	15.2	+15.2
Liberal Democrats	Leon Maurice Duveen	98	7.5	+7.5
Turnout			23.28	
Conservative hold		Swing		

East Retford West By-Election 15 November 2018
Party	Candidate	Votes	%	±%
Labour	Matthew Callingham	441	49.9	+12.6
Conservative	Emma Auckland	296	33.5	+4.8
Liberal Democrats	Helen Tamblyn-Saville	146	16.5	+3.7
Majority		145	16.4	
Turnout		883		
Labour hold		Swing		

=== 2019-2023 ===
Ranskill By-Election 6 May 2021
Party	Candidate	Votes	%	±%
Conservative	Gerald Bowers	454	63.0	+34.0
Independent	Michael Gray	193	26.8	+1.7
Liberal Democrats	Leon Duveen	74	10.3	+3.9
Majority		261	36.2	
Turnout		721		
Conservative gain from Labour		Swing		

Sutton By-Election 6 May 2021
Party	Candidate	Votes	%	±%
Conservative	Denise Depledge	422	63.7	+37.3
Labour	Laura Sanders	134	20.2	+8.2
Liberal Democrats	Richard Harris	107	16.1	+16.1
Majority		288	43.4	
Turnout		663		
Conservative gain from Independent		Swing		

Tuxford and Trent By-Election 6 May 2021
Party	Candidate	Votes	%	±%
Conservative	Lewis Stanniland	745	57.7	+14.2
Labour	David Naylor	472	36.5	+16.9
Liberal Democrats	James Nixon	75	5.8	+5.8
Majority		273	21.1	
Turnout		1,292		
Conservative hold		Swing		

East Retford South By-Election 29 July 2021
Party	Candidate	Votes	%	±%
Conservative	Mike Introna	493	40.1	+22.5
Independent	Helen Richards	488	39.7	+39.7
Labour	James Napier	247	20.1	−42.0
Majority		5	0.4	
Turnout		1,288		
Conservative gain from Labour		Swing		

Sutton By-Election 24 November 2022
Party	Candidate	Votes	%	±%
Labour	Darrell Pulk	301	55.9	+35.7
Conservative	Fraser McFarland	224	41.6	−22.1
Liberal Democrats	Phil Ray	13	2.4	−13.7
Majority		77	14.3	
Turnout		538		
Labour gain from Conservative		Swing		

=== 2023-2027 ===
Rampton By-Election 4 July 2024
Party	Candidate	Votes	%	±%
Conservative	Simon Richardson	652	59.2	−11.4
Labour	Ray Fielding	278	25.2	−4.2
Liberal Democrats	Simon Russell	172	15.6	+15.6
Majority		374	33.9	
Turnout		1,102		
Conservative hold		Swing		

Beckingham By-Election 1 May 2025
Party	Candidate	Votes	%	±%
Reform	Warren Limber	279	33.7	+33.7
Conservative	Tracey Taylor	267	32.3	−8.7
Independent	Mark Watson	226	27.3	+27.3
Liberal Democrats	Leon Duveen	55	6.7	+6.7
Majority		12	1.5	
Turnout		827		
Reform gain from Independent		Swing		

Sturton By-Election 1 May 2025
Party	Candidate	Votes	%	±%
Reform	Matt Turner	331	43.0	+43.0
Conservative	James Purle	231	30.0	+7.6
Labour	Colette Roberts	139	18.1	−59.5
Liberal Democrats	Simon Russell	68	8.8	+8.8
Majority		100	13.0	
Turnout		769		
Reform gain from Labour		Swing		

East Markham By-Election 15 September 2026
Party	Candidate	Votes	%	±%
Reform	Matthew Evans	436	49.6	+49.6
Conservative	James Purle	250	28.4	−37.6
Labour	Colette Roberts	151	17.2	−4.0
Green	David Bean	42	4.8	+4.8
Majority		186	21.2	
Turnout		879		
Reform gain from Conservative		Swing		

Worksop East By-Election 29 October 2026
Party	Candidate	Votes	%	±%
Reform	Nancy Wright	600	45.9	
Labour	Cameron Holt	485	37.1	
Restore	Anne Froggatt	91	7.0	
Conservative	Ben Storey	89	6.8	
Green	Anne Kean	42	3.2	
Majority		115	8.8	
Turnout		1,307		
Reform gain from Labour		Swing		
