= Skegby Rural District =

Former local government area in the UK

Coordinates: 53.1°N 1.15°W

- History
  - Created: 1894
  - Abolished: 1935
  - Succeeded by: Southwell Rural District; Basford Rural District; Warsop Urban District; Sutton in Ashfield Urban District
- Status: Rural district

Skegby was a rural district in Nottinghamshire, England from 1894 to 1935.

It was created under the Local Government Act 1894 based on that part of the Mansfield rural sanitary district which was in Nottinghamshire (the rest becoming Blackwell Rural District in Derbyshire). It consisted of the parishes of Blidworth, Fulwood, Haywood Oaks, Lindhurst, Skegby, Sookholme and Teversal.

In 1935 the district was abolished under a County Review Order. Some urbanised parts went to Warsop and Sutton in Ashfield urban districts, with the rest going mainly to Southwell Rural District and part to Basford Rural District.
