= 1973 Bassetlaw District Council election =

1973 UK local government election

- 7 June 1973

All 51 seats to Bassetlaw District Council 26 seats needed for a majority
	First party	Second party	Third party
	Lab	Con	Ind
Party	Labour	Conservative	Independent
Seats won	29	11	11
- Map of the results of the election. Colours denote the party achieving the highest number of votes in each ward.
Council control before election
New
Council control after election
Labour

The 1973 Bassetlaw District Council election took place on 7 June 1973, to elect all 51 members of Bassetlaw District Council in England. This was on the same day as other local elections. The election resulted in the Labour Party winning a majority of seats on the council.

This was the first election to elect members of the new district council for Bassetlaw following its creation by the Local Government Act 1972. The council acted as a shadow authority until 1 April 1974, when it gained control over local government functions from its predecessor authorities; the East Retford Rural District, the Municipal Borough of East Retford, the Municipal Borough of Worksop and the Worksop Rural District councils.

== Result ==
Bassetlaw District Council election, 1973
Party	Seats	Gains	Losses	Net gain/loss	Seats %	Votes %	Votes	+/−
Labour	29							
Conservative	11							
Independent	11							

== Ward results ==
=== Blyth (1) ===
Blyth
Party	Candidate	Votes	%	±%
Independent	A. Buchanan	331	49.9%	N/A
Labour	K. Muskett	173	26.1%	N/A
Independent	C. Moxon	159	24.0%	N/A
Turnout			51.9%	

=== Carlton ===
Carlton (3)
Party	Candidate	Votes	%	±%
Independent	J. Lacey	828	43.2%	N/A
Independent	C. Dodd	564	29.4%	N/A
Labour	L. Russon	524	27.3%	N/A
Labour	J. Connolly	511		
Labour	L. Hince	479		
Turnout			47.9%	

=== East Retford West ===
East Retford West (3)
Party	Candidate	Votes	%	±%
Labour	E. Mitchell	1,114	54.5%	N/A
Labour	W. Cooper	1,052		
Labour	H. Pulford	947		
Conservative	Richard Alexander	929	45.5%	N/A
Conservative	D. Pitts	850		
Conservative	N. Myers	789		
Turnout			47.1%	
