= Charter trustee =

In England and Wales, charter trustees are set up to maintain the continuity of a town charter or city charter after a district with the status of a borough or city has been abolished, until such time as a civil parish council or in larger settlements, a town council is established. Duties are limited to ceremonial activities such as the election of a mayor, and various other functions depending upon local customs and laws.

The charter trustees are made up of local councillors in the district representing wards within the boundaries of the town/city. If there are fewer than three district councillors for the former borough, then qualified local electors may be co-opted to make the number up to three.

Charter trustees must hold an annual meeting within twenty-one days of the annual meeting of the district council. The first item of business is the election of a town or city mayor and deputy mayor for the next year.

As of 2023, there are nineteen areas in England which continue to appoint charter trustees.

== History ==
=== Local Government Act 1972 ===
The original bodies of charter trustees were set up in 1974, under section 246 of the Local Government Act 1972. The concept was introduced into the Bill by a government amendment in September 1972.

Section 245(4) of the Local Government Act 1972 allowed the shadow district councils to make a petition to the monarch for borough status, before their coming into effect on 1 April 1974. In this case, if "it is signified on behalf of Her Majesty before that date that She proposes to accede" to the request then, the style of borough could be used immediately from 1 April 1974, despite the fact that the charter would be presented only later.

For the new districts which made no such petition (or where it was refused), for each former municipal borough in the district which was to become an unparished area (rather than a successor parish), a body corporate was established under section 246(4) of the act, styled as the charter trustees of the town or city.

Charter Trustees Order 1974 (Note: Article 1.)
- Statutory Instrument
- Parliament of the United Kingdom
- Citation: SI 1974/176

Dates
- Made: 6 February 1974
- Laid before Parliament: 7 February 1974
- Commencement: 18 March 1974
Other legislation
Made under	Local Government Act 1972
Amended by	Local Authorities (Capital Finance) (Consequential, Transitional and Saving Provisions) Order 2004

Status: Amended

Text of statute as originally enacted

In the original legislation, charter trustees could also be formed in Welsh districts, but the Charter Trustees Order 1974 (SI 1974/176), which provided for the establishment of the trustees, stated that the section "shall not apply to the area consisting of the counties established by section 20 of the Act (new local government areas in Wales)", and "there will be no charter trustees in Wales."

=== Charter Trustees Act 1985 ===
Charter Trustees Act 1985 (Note: Section 2(1).)
- Act of Parliament
- Parliament of the United Kingdom
- Long title: An Act to provide for the continuation of the charter trustees of any city or town and for the preservation of their powers and of the privileges and rights of the inhabitants of their area upon that area becoming comprised in a borough.
- Citation: 1985 c. 45
- Territorial extent: England and Wales (Note: Section 2(3).)

Dates
- Royal assent: 16 July 1985
- Commencement: 16 July 1985 (Note: Section 4(b) of the Interpretation Act 1978.)
Other legislation
Amends	Local Government Act 1972

Status: Current legislation

Text of statute as originally enacted

Text of the Charter Trustees Act 1985 as in force today (including any amendments) within the United Kingdom, from legislation.gov.uk.

Originally, under section 246(7), when the district in which a town for which charter trustees had been established gained the status of a borough, the trustees would be immediately dissolved. Some new district councils petitioned for borough status soon after 1 April 1974, quickly dissolving the charter trustees.

This was changed by the Charter Trustees Act 1985 (c. 45), which provided that charter trustees would cease to exist only when a parish council was formed for the area of the former borough.

=== Local Government Act 1992 ===
Legislation passed in 1992 led to the establishment of a Local Government Commission whose remit was to review the system created in 1974. As a result there was a partial reorganisation, with a number of districts with borough or city status being abolished. The mechanism of creating charter trustees to preserve civic traditions was again used. However, trustees were created only where an outgoing council requested their establishment. The failure of the extinguished City of Rochester-upon-Medway council to appoint charter trustees for Rochester or to apply for Rochester's city status to be transferred to the replacement unitary authority of Medway led to Rochester losing its city status.

Some abolished boroughs such as Beverley included a large rural area. In such cases, the charter trustees were not established for the entire area of the former borough, but were limited to that part of the new authority which was unparished: the area identifiable as the town.

=== Local Government and Public Involvement in Health Act 2007 ===
A further wave of reorganisations came into effect in some areas of England on 1 April 2009, under the terms of the Local Government and Public Involvement in Health Act 2007. The reforms saw the creation of new unitary authorities and the abolition of a number of districts with city or borough status. The Charter Trustees Regulations 2009 (SI 2009/467) allow for the creation of trustees to preserve civic traditions in those areas where there is no obvious successor parish council. In the case of the cities of Chester and Durham the charter trustees area are identical to the entire abolished district, which includes not only the central unparished area but also the surrounding parishes.

== List ==
=== Current ===
Name of charter trustees	Area when established	Local government area	Ceremonial county	Created	Website
City of Bath	City of Bath district (1974–1996)	Bath and North East Somerset	Somerset	1996	
City of Carlisle	The wards of Belah and Kingmoor, Botcherby and Harraby North, Cathedral and Castle, Currock and Upperby, Denton Holme and Morton South, Harraby South and Parklands, Newtown and Morton North, Sandsfield and Morton West and Stanwix and Houghton.	Cumberland	Cumbria	2023	
City of Chester	The wards of Blacon, Boughton Heath and Vicars Cross, Broxton, City, Gowy, Hoole and Newton, Mickle Trafford, Overleigh and Upton.	Cheshire West and Chester	Cheshire	2009	
City of Durham	The electoral divisions of Belmont, Brandon, Coxhoe, Deerness Valley, Durham South, Elvet, Framwellgate Moor, Gilesgate, Neville’s Cross, Newton Hall and Sherburn	County Durham	County Durham	2009	
Cleethorpes	Unparished area of the Borough of Cleethorpes	North East Lincolnshire	Lincolnshire	1996	
East Retford	The Municipal Borough of East Retford	Bassetlaw	Nottinghamshire	1974	
Ellesmere Port	The wards of Grange and Rossmore, Groves and Whitby, the unparished part of the Central and Westminster ward, and the parts of the wards of Ledsham and Willaston and Sutton and Manor comprised in the Ledsham, Sutton, Sutton Green and Manor and Willaston and Thornton wards of the former Ellesmere Port and Neston Borough Council.	Cheshire West and Chester	Cheshire	2009	
Great Grimsby	Borough of Great Grimsby	North East Lincolnshire	Lincolnshire	1996	
High Wycombe	The Municipal Borough of High Wycombe	Wycombe	Buckinghamshire	1974	
Mansfield	The Municipal Borough of Mansfield	Mansfield district	Nottinghamshire	1974	
Margate	The Municipal Borough of Margate	Thanet	Kent	1974	
Scunthorpe	Borough of Scunthorpe	North Lincolnshire	Lincolnshire	1996	
Worksop	The Municipal Borough of Worksop	Bassetlaw	Nottinghamshire	1974	

=== Former ===
Former municipal borough	Successor district	County in 1974	Created	Parished/abolished
Andover	Test Valley District	Hampshire	1974	abolished 1976, successor the Borough of Test Valley, parished in 2010
Aylesbury	Aylesbury Vale	Buckinghamshire	1974	parished 2000
Banbury	Cherwell	Oxfordshire	1974	parished 2000
Barrow-in-Furness	Westmorland and Furness	Cumbria	2023	parished 2023
Basingstoke	Basingstoke District	Hampshire	1974	abolished 1978, successor the Borough of Basingstoke and Deane
Bedford	Bedford District	Bedfordshire	1974	abolished 1975, successor the Borough of North Bedfordshire
Beverley	East Riding of Yorkshire	Humberside	1996	parished 1999
Bexhill-on-Sea	Rother	East Sussex	1974	parished 2021
Bootle	Sefton	Merseyside	1974	abolished c. 1975, successor the Borough of Sefton
Bournemouth	Bournemouth Borough Council	Dorset	2019	parished 2026
Bridgwater	Sedgemoor	Somerset	1974	parished 2003
Burton upon Trent	East Staffordshire	Staffordshire	1974	abolished 1992 when East Staffordshire became a borough unparished area became various parishes in 2003
Chelmsford	Chelmsford District	Essex	1974	abolished 1977, successor the Borough of Chelmsford
Chippenham	North Wiltshire	Wiltshire	1974	parished 1984
Cleethorpes	Cleethorpes District	Humberside	1974	abolished 1975, successor the Borough of Cleethorpes
Colne	Pendle district	Lancashire	1974	abolished 1976, successor the Borough of Pendle
Crewe	Cheshire East	Cheshire	2009	parished 2013
Crosby	Sefton	Merseyside	1974	abolished c. 1975, successor the Borough of Sefton
Dartford	Dartford district	Kent	1974	abolished 1977, successor the Borough of Dartford
Daventry	Daventry district	Northamptonshire	1974	parished 2003
Deal	Dover district	Kent	1974	parished 1996
Dover	Dover district	Kent	1974	parished 1996
Dunstable	South Bedfordshire	Bedfordshire	1974	parished 1985
Folkestone	Shepway	Kent	1974	parished 2004
Grantham	South Kesteven	Lincolnshire	1974	parished 2024
Goole	Boothferry	Humberside	1974	abolished 1978, successor the Borough of Boothferry. The area was parished in 1983.
Harrogate	Harrogate District	North Yorkshire	2023	parished 2025
Hemel Hempstead	Dacorum District	Hertfordshire	1974	Abolished 1984, successor the Borough of Dacorum
City of Hereford	Herefordshire	Herefordshire	1998	parished 2000
Ilkeston	Erewash	Derbyshire	1974	abolished 1975, successor the Borough of Erewash
Kidderminster	Wyre Forest	Worcestershire	1974	parished 2016
King's Lynn	West Norfolk district	Norfolk	1974	Abolished 1981, successor the Borough of King's Lynn and West Norfolk
City of Lichfield	Lichfield district	Staffordshire	1974	parished 1980
Lowestoft	Waveney	Suffolk	1974	parished 2017
Lymington	New Forest district	Hampshire	1974	parished (as four parishes) 1979
Macclesfield	Cheshire East	Cheshire	2009	parished 2015
Maldon	Maldon	Essex	1974	parished 1987
Nelson	Pendle district	Lancashire	1974	Abolished 1976, successor the Borough of Pendle
Newark	Newark district	Nottinghamshire	1974	parished 1980
Newbury	West Berkshire	Berkshire	1974	parished 1997
Penzance	Penwith	Cornwall	1974	parished 1980
Poole	Poole Borough Council	Dorset	2019	parished 2026
Queenborough-in-Sheppey	Swale district	Kent	1974	Parished (as four parishes) in 1982
Ramsgate	Thanet	Kent	1974	parished 2009
Royal Leamington Spa	Warwick district	Warwickshire	1974	parished 2002
Royal Tunbridge Wells	Tunbridge Wells district	Kent	1974	Abolished 1974, successor the Borough of Tunbridge Wells
City of Salisbury (New Sarum)	Salisbury district	Wiltshire	1974	parished 2009
Scarborough	Scarborough District	North Yorkshire	2023	parished 2025
Southport	Sefton	Merseyside	1974	abolished c. 1975, successor the Borough of Sefton
Taunton	Taunton Deane District	Somerset	1974, re-established 2019	abolished 1975, successor the Borough of Taunton Deane. Parished 1 April 2023 (Taunton Town Council)
Weston-super-Mare	Woodspring (now North Somerset)	Avon	1974	parished 2000
Workington	Allerdale	Cumbria	1974	parished 1982
Yeovil	Yeovil district (now South Somerset)	Somerset	1974	parished 1984

== Changes ==
=== 2009 ===
The structural changes to local government in 2009 led to the formation of charter trustees for Crewe, Macclesfield, Chester and Ellesmere Port. The charter trustees for Crewe and Macclesfield were subsequently abolished and replaced by parishes.

=== 2019 ===
Charter trustees were established in April 2019 for Bournemouth, Poole and Taunton as a consequence of local government structural changes in Dorset and Somerset.

=== 2023 ===
On 1 April 2023 the unitary authorities of Cumberland, Westmorland and Furness, and North Yorkshire were established. Charter trustees were established for Carlisle (which also preserved its city status), Barrow, Harrogate and Scarborough. The charter trustees for Harrogate and Scarborough were subsequently abolished and replaced by parishes.

=== Planned ===
As part of another round of local government reform, charter trustees have been proposed for Newcastle-under-Lyme, Stoke-on-Trent and Surrey Heath.

== Sources ==
- Local Government Act 1972
- Charter Trustees Act 1985 (C.45)
- Local Government in England and Wales : A guide to the New System, HMSO, London 1974
