= South Wilford =

Coordinates: 52.933°N 1.159°W

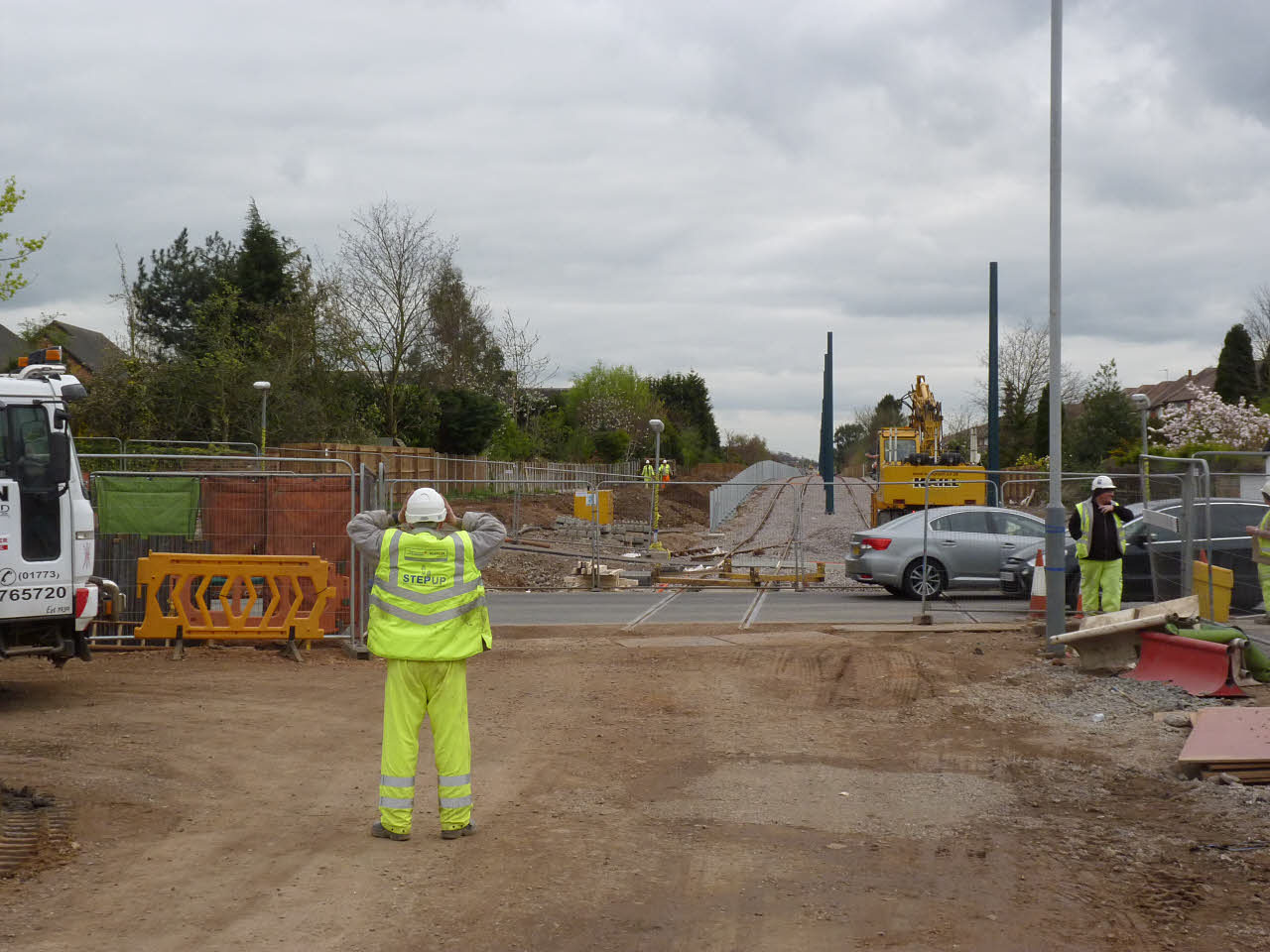
- Wilford Lane road crossing

- Location within Nottinghamshire
- District: Rushcliffe; Nottingham
- Shire county: Nottinghamshire
- Region: East Midlands
- Country: England
- Sovereign state: United Kingdom

South Wilford was a civil parish in Nottinghamshire, England from 1894 to 1935. It was formed under the Local Government Act 1894 from the parts of the parishes of Wilford and Lenton which were not part of the county borough of Nottingham. It formed part of the Basford Rural District.

On 1 April 1935, under a County Review Order, the parish was abolished and merged with West Bridgford and became part of the West Bridgford Urban District. In 1931 the parish had a population of 1097. The part of the parish west of the railway line was added to the city of Nottingham in 1952.
