= 141 Nottingham–Sutton-in-Ashfield =

Bus Route

Route 141 is a bus route that operates between Nottingham and Sutton-in-Ashfield.

In early July 2022, Trentbarton announced that it would stop running route 141 in September of that same year. However, later in the month it was announced that Nottinghamshire County Council would subsidise the service for a year and would tender the route with local bus operators. On 18 August 2022, it was announced that Stagecoach would take over the route on 5 September.

The service operates hourly between the city, towns and villages of Nottingham, Bestwood Village, Hucknall, Linby, Papplewick, Ravenshead, Blidworth, Mansfield, Skegby, Stanton Hill and Sutton-in-Ashfield. It formerly continued to Clay Cross, also serving the North East Derbyshire villages of Morton and Pilsley.

The route was extended in February 2024 to serve the newly-constructed Oak House in Linby, the headquarters of Nottinghamshire County Council.
