= Kirkby in Ashfield Urban District =

Former local government area in the UK

Kirkby in Ashfield
- Kirkby in Ashfield Urban District shown within Nottinghamshire in 1970
- Area
  - 1911: 5,814 acres (23.53 km^{2})
  - 1961: 5,830 acres (23.6 km^{2})
- Population
  - 1911: 15,378
  - 1961: 21,686
- History
  - Created: 1896
  - Abolished: 1974
  - Succeeded by: Ashfield
- Status: Urban District
- Government: Kirkby in Ashfield Urban District Council
  - HQ: Kirkby in Ashfield

Kirkby in Ashfield was an Urban District in Nottinghamshire, England, from 1896 to 1974. It was created under the Local Government Act 1894.

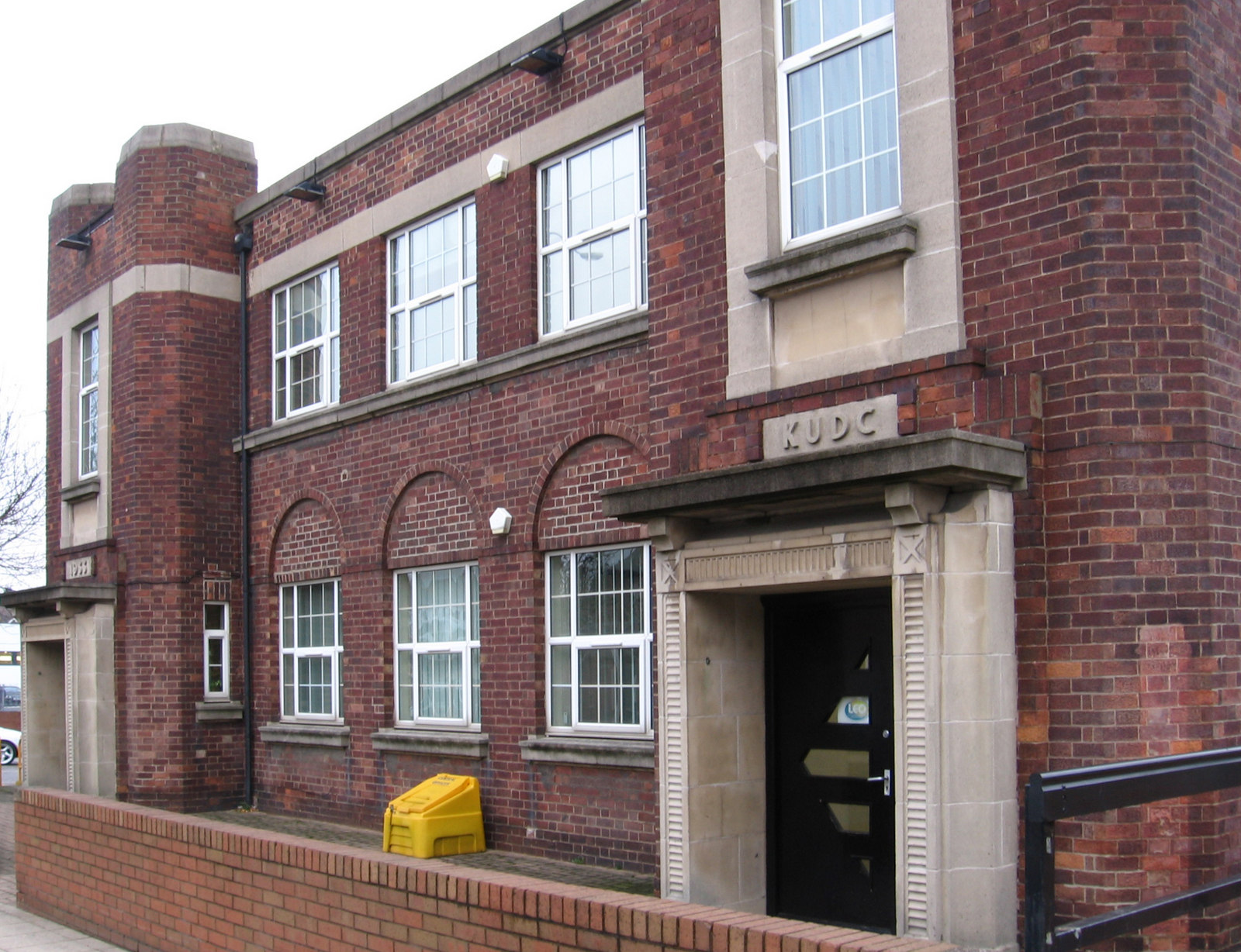
Ada Lovelace House, built 1933 as council's offices, with "KUDC" above the door

The council built itself a headquarters on Urban Road in 1933, now known as Ada Lovelace House.

The district was abolished in 1974 under the Local Government Act 1972 and combined with Sutton in Ashfield Urban District, Hucknall Urban District and part of Basford Rural District to form the new Ashfield District.
