= Clowne Rural District =

Former local government area in the UK

Coordinates: 53.28°N 1.25°W

Clowne
- Clowne Rural District shown within Derbyshire in 1970.
- History
  - Created: 1894
  - Abolished: 1974
  - Succeeded by: Bolsover
- Status: Rural district
- Government: Clowne Rural District Council

Clowne was a rural district in Derbyshire, England from 1894 to 1974.

It was created by the Local Government Act 1894 as that part of the Worksop rural sanitary district which was in Derbyshire (the rest becoming either Worksop Rural District or Kiveton Park Rural District). It consisted of four civil parishes :

- Barlborough
- Clowne
- Elmton
- Whitwell

It was abolished in 1974 under the Local Government Act 1972, going on to form part of the new district of Bolsover.
