= Carlton Urban District =

Urban District in Nottinghamshire, England

Carlton
- Carlton Urban District shown within Nottinghamshire in 1970.
- Area
  - 1911: 1,459 acres (5.90 km^{2})
  - 1961: 4,017 acres (16.26 km^{2})
- Population
  - 1911: 15,581
  - 1961: 38,815
- History
  - Created: 1894
  - Abolished: 1974
  - Succeeded by: Gedling
- Status: Urban District
- Government: Carlton Urban District Council
  - HQ: Carlton, Nottinghamshire

Carlton was an Urban District in Nottinghamshire, England, from 1894 to 1974. It was created under the Local Government Act 1894.

It was enlarged in 1935 when the Gedling civil parish and part of Colwick civil parish were transferred to the district from Basford Rural District.

The district was abolished in 1974 under the Local Government Act 1972 and combined with Arnold Urban District and part of Basford Rural District to form the new Gedling district.
