= Bingham Rural District =

Former local government area in the UK

Coordinates: 52.95°N 0.95°W

- Bingham Rural District shown within Nottinghamshire in 1970.
- History
  - Created: 1894
  - Abolished: 1974
  - Succeeded by: Rushcliffe
- Status: Rural District
  - HQ: Bingham, Nottinghamshire

Bingham was a rural district in Nottinghamshire, England from 1894 to 1974.

It was created under the Local Government Act 1894 from the Bingham rural sanitary district. It took in the parish of Gamston from Basford Rural District in 1935, and lost the parish of Edwalton to West Bridgford.

The district continued until 1974 when under the Local Government Act 1972 it was abolished, going to form part of the Rushcliffe district.
