= Kiveton Park Rural District =

Former local government area in the UK

Coordinates: 53.430°N 1.357°W

Kiveton Park
- Area
  - 1911: 20,070 acres (81.2 km^{2})
  - 1961: 20,070 acres (81.2 km^{2})
- Population
  - 1901: 6,659
  - 1971: 26,855
- History
  - Origin: Rural sanitary district
  - Created: 1894
  - Abolished: 1974
  - Succeeded by: Metropolitan Borough of Rotherham
- Status: Rural district
- Government: Kiveton Park Rural District Council
  - HQ: South Anston
  - Motto: Consilio et Animis (By Wisdom and Courage)
- Subdivisions
  - Type: Civil parishes

Kiveton Park was a rural district in the West Riding of Yorkshire from 1894 to 1974.

It was formed under the Local Government Act 1894 from that part of the Worksop rural sanitary district which was in the West Riding – the rest going to form Worksop Rural District in Nottinghamshire and Clowne Rural District in Derbyshire. The rural district took its name from the village of Kiveton Park.

The rural district originally comprised 11 civil parishes:

- Dinnington
- Firbeck
- Gildingwells
- Harthill with Woodall
- Letwell
- North and South Anston
- St Johns with Throapham
- Thorpe Salvin
- Todwick
- Wales
- Woodsetts

In 1954 the number of parishes was reduced to 10 when Dinnington and St Johns with Throapham were merged to form Dinnington St John's.

The district survived until 1974 when it was abolished by the Local Government Act 1972, becoming part of the Metropolitan Borough of Rotherham in South Yorkshire.

== Coat of arms ==
A coat of arms was granted to Kiveton Park Rural District Council by the College of Arms on 11 March 1949. The blazon of the arms was as follows:
Quarterly ermine and azure, on a cross Or between in the first quarter a cock and a magpie combatant proper, in the second quarter a hart trippant, in the third quarter a garb of the third and in the fourth quarter an oak tree eradicated also proper fructed gold, a torteau charged with a rose argent barbed and seeded also proper; and for a Crest: on a wreath of the colours, a castle of four towers Or.

The basic pattern of the arms was based on those of the Osborne family of Kiveton: quarterly ermine and azure overall a cross Or. Thomas Osborne was created Earl of Danby in 1674, Marquess of Carmarthen in 1689 and Duke of Leeds in 1694. In the first quarter were a cock and magpie (or pynot). This refers to the fact that The Earl of Danby was one of the "immortal seven" who signed the Invitation to William at the Cock and Pynot Inn in 1688. The hart stood for Hart Hill Walk. The garb or wheatsheaf and oak tree represented the rural nature of the area. In the centre of the arms was a Yorkshire rose. The crest was intended to depict Thorpe Salvin Hall, some time seat of the Osbornes.
