= Listed buildings in Linby =

Linby is a civil parish in the Gedling district of Nottinghamshire, England. The parish contains 27 listed buildings that are recorded in the National Heritage List for England. Of these, two are listed at Grade II*, the middle of the three grades, and the others are at Grade II, the lowest grade. The parish contains the village of Linby and the surrounding countryside. Most of the listed buildings are houses, cottages and associated structures, farmhouses and farm buildings. The others include a church, a headstone in the churchyard, two village crosses, a water mill, two boundary markers and a telephone kiosk.

== Key ==
Grade	Criteria
II*	Particularly important buildings of more than special interest
II	Buildings of national importance and special interest

== Buildings ==
Name and location	Photograph	Date	Notes	Grade
St Michael's Church; 53.05268°N 1.20398°W		12th century	The church has been altered and extended through the centuries, and it was restored 1897–98. It is built in stone with slate roofs, and consists of a nave, a south aisle, a north porch, a chancel, vestries and a west tower. The tower has two stages, a moulded string course, an eaves band with two gargoyles, and a moulded embattled parapet with four crocketed pinnacles. In the southwest corner is a canted stair turret, and on the west front is a 13th-century doorway with a moulded surround and a hood mould, over which is a triple lancet window with a hood mould. On the north front is a clock face, and the bell openings are double lancets with hood moulds. The porch is gabled with a cross finial, and has buttresses, and a doorway with a moulded surround, to the left of which is a squint, and above it are carved shields.	II*
Bottom Cross; 53.05482°N 1.20170°W		14th century	The village cross was altered in 1663 and restored in about 1869. It stands in an enclosure by a road junction, and is built over a stream. The cross is in stone, and has a square plinth of five steps, a broached square base, a chamfered square tapering shaft with a cornice, and a cross head which dates from about 1869.	II
Top Cross; 53.05364°N 1.20443°W		14th century	The village cross was restored in 1869. It stands in an enclosure by a road junction, and is in stone. There is an octagonal base of seven steps, a broached square plinth, and a chamfered tapered square cross with a cornice.	II
Hall Farmhouse, Cottage and wall 53.05467°N 1.20481°W	—	15th century	The wing of a former manor house, which has been altered, it is in stone and has a tile roof with coped gables. There are three storeys and an L-shaped plan, with a main range of seven bays. Most of the windows are two-light casements with mullions. The west front has a canted stair turret at each end, and a doorway with a moulded surround and a fanlight. To the right is a later addition in brick and stone with pantile and flat roofs, with two storeys and two bays, and there are two-storey rear wings. The adjoining boundary wall has flat and chamfered copings, and extends for about 30 metres (98 ft).	II
The Old Rectory; 53.05403°N 1.20212°W	—	17th century	The rectory, later a private house, was extended in 1856. It is in stone on a plinth, with rebated eaves, and a tile roof with coped gables. There are two storeys and a basement, and an L-shaped plan, with fronts of three and five bays. Most of the windows are sashes with projecting architraves, or casements with mullions. On the east front is a Doric portico with an open pediment, and a doorway with a reeded surround, a fanlight, and a keystone. On the north gable is a gabled bell turret.	II
Pigeoncote and walls, Hall Farm; 53.05439°N 1.20475°W	—	Late 17th century	The pigeoncote is in stone, and has a pantile roof with a plain tile verge, and a coped gable with kneelers. There are two storeys, two bays, and a rectangular plan. On the north side are garage doors and a square louvred opening, the west side has a lean-to toilet, and on the east side is an opening with a chamfered segmental head. The adjoining boundary walls have flat slab coping.	II
The Limes; 53.05424°N 1.20473°W	—	Late 17th century	A farmhouse, later a private house, in stone and brick, with quoins, and slate roofs with coped gables and finials. There are two storeys and three bays, and on the west side are three gables. In the centre is a rendered flat-roofed porch and a doorway with a fanlight. The windows are a mix of casements and sashes, and there are also canted bay windows and round windows.	II
Headstone; 53.05259°N 1.20384°W	—	1692	The headstone is in the churchyard of St Michael's Church, to the south of the chancel. It is in stone, with a shouldered and arched head, and has an inscription that is only partly legible.	II
Threshing barn, Hall Farm; 53.05520°N 1.20535°W	—	Mid 18th century	The barn is in stone with a roof of tile and asbestos. There are two storeys and three bays. The openings include doors and vents.	II
The Old Post Office; 53.05425°N 1.20270°W	—	Mid 18th century	The house is in stone with a pantile roof, two storeys and three bays, and the windows are horizontally-sliding sashes. On the front is a central doorway with a segmental head, a passage doorway to the right, and the ground floor windows have segmental heads. At the rear is a single-storey outbuilding, a lean-to bay window, and a porch.	II
Watermill Barn; 53.05402°N 1.20281°W	—	Mid 18th century	The barn, which has been converted into a house, is in stone with a pantile roof. There are two storeys, and an L-shaped plan, with a main range of five unequal bays, and later single-storey extensions with a slate roof. The windows are casements. On the front are a doorway, windows, a carriage opening and vents, and outside is a breast-shot water wheel, with a brick and stone parapet wall.	II
21 Main Street and outbuilding 53.05461°N 1.20175°W		c. 1770	The house and outbuilding are in stone with tile roofs. The house has two storeys and three bays. The doorway has a flat stone hood on shaped brackets, and the windows are a mix of casements and horizontally-sliding sashes. To the right is an outbuilding containing a round-headed doorway with a keystone.	II
Town Farmhouse; 53.05392°N 1.20302°W	—	c. 1770	The farmhouse, later a private house, is in stone and brick, with a tile roof. There are two storeys and attics, and an L-shaped plan, with a front range of two bays, and a lean-to extension with a slate roof on the right. Most of the windows are casements, some with mullions.	II
Western House; 53.05350°N 1.20557°W	—	c. 1775	A farmhouse and a service wing converted into a private house, it is stone, with moulded eaves and slate roofs. There are two storeys and an L-shaped plan, with a main range of six bays. The windows are a mix of casements and horizontally-sliding sashes. On the front is a gabled porch and a bow window. The service wing is lower, with two storeys, and contains garage doors. At the rear is a gabled wing, and a lean-to in the angle.	II
13–19 Main Street; 53.05467°N 1.20256°W		Late 18th century	A group of cottages in stone with some weatherboarding and pantile roofs. There are two storeys and attics, and an L-shaped plan with seven bays, forming two ranges at right angles. The windows are casements, and in the range facing the street is a carriage entrance.	II
Brewhouse, crewyard and mill barn, Hall Farm; 53.05503°N 1.20519°W		Late 18th century	The farm and mill buildings are in stone and brick, with roofs of tile, pantile and asbestos. They form a C-shaped plan, with ranges of five and seven bays, and have a single storey or two storeys and attics. The windows are a mix of casements and horizontally-sliding sashes. The brewhouse is on the left, and has external steps, and the crewyard has stables in seven bays. The mill barn also has external steps, with a kennel, and adjoining it is a wheelpit containing an iron waterwheel.	II*
The Old Mill; 53.05361°N 1.20507°W		Late 18th century	A cart shed and outbuilding converted into a house, it is in stone with quoins and a pantile roof. There are two storeys and an L-shaped plan, with a main range of three bays. The windows are top-hung casements, those in the rear wing with keystones. On the east front are three cart openings with square piers and segmental heads, and on the north gable is an external staircase.	II
Weir Mill House and Cottage; 53.06232°N 1.19807°W	—	Late 18th century	The house and cottage are in stone with slate roofs. There are two storeys and attics, and an L-shaped plan, with a main range of six unequal bays. The buildings contain two doorways, one with a hood on shaped brackets, and the other with a gabled hood, and the windows are a mix of casements, some with mullions, and horizontally-sliding sashes. To the right is a later extension with a half-round stair turret.	II
Barn, stable and cart sheds north of Weir Mill Farmhouse; 53.06320°N 1.19777°W	—	Late 18th century	The farm buildings are in stone, and have roofs of tile, pantile, slate and asbestos sheet with coped gables. The buildings include a barn with various openings, external steps with a kennel below, and the remains of a pigeoncote in the gable, a stable with three bays, a four-bay cart shed, and an open cart shed with five bays.	II
Castle Mill; 53.05362°N 1.18795°W		c. 1783	A cotton mill and cottage converted into three dwellings in about 1960. It is in stone on a partial plinth, with an embattled parapet, and a roof of tile and slate with one coped gable. There are two storeys and a basement, and six unequal bays. Most of the windows are casements, those on the front with architraves, and there are French windows, some with balconies. On the north front are two embattled towers, each with two roundels and a quatrefoil. On the south front are the remains of a wheelpit.	II
5, 6 and 7 Main Street; 53.05338°N 1.20517°W		Early 19th century	A row of three cottages in stone with tile roofs. There are two storeys and an L-shaped plan, with a front range of seven bays, a lean-to on the left, and a rear wing. On the front are doorways, and windows which are mainly horizontally-sliding sashes. The adjoining boundary wall has half-round coping and a square corner pier, and it extends for about 40 metres (130 ft).	II
12 Main Street; 53.05448°N 1.20316°W	—	Early 19th century	A stone house that has a pantile roof with coped gables. There are two storeys, two bays and rear wings. In the centre is a doorway, the windows are casements, and the ground floor openings have segmental heads.	II
Clematis Cottage; 53.05403°N 1.20424°W	—	Early 19th century	The house is in stone and brick, with a slate roof, two storeys, three bays and a rear extension. The doorway is in the centre, and the windows are casements.	II
Water Mill and stables, Colliery Farm; 53.05378°N 1.20529°W	—	Early 19th century	The water mill and stable are in stone and brick with asbestos cement roofs. There is a single storey and lofts, and an L-shaped plan, with a main range of three bays. The mill has a doorway to the waterwheel, and vents. The stable has a casement window and a doorway, to the right are cart openings with a central pier, and further to the right is a doorway flanked by casement windows, all with keystones, and inside is a pair of millstones.	II
Glebe boundary marker south of the Old Rectory; 53.05261°N 1.20139°W	—	Early 19th century	The boundary marker consists of a round-headed stone inscribed "South and West boundary of Glebe".	II
Glebe boundary marker southeast of the Old Rectory; 53.05288°N 1.20067°W	—	Early 19th century	The boundary marker consists of a round-headed stone inscribed "South and East boundary of Glebe".	II
Telephone kiosk 53.05433°N 1.20263°W		1935	The K6 type telephone kiosk in Main Street was designed by Giles Gilbert Scott. Constructed in cast iron with a square plan and a dome, it has three unperforated crowns in the top panels.	II
