= Arnold Urban District =

Abolished urban district in Nottinghamshire

Coordinates: 53.00°N 1.12°W

Arnold
- Arnold Urban District shown within Nottinghamshire in 1970
- Area
  - 1911: 4,613 acres (18.67 km^{2})
  - 1961: 4,507 acres (18.24 km^{2})
- Population
  - 1911: 11,146
  - 1961: 26,829
- History
  - Created: 1894
  - Abolished: 1974
  - Succeeded by: Gedling
- Status: Urban District
- Government: Arnold Urban District Council
  - HQ: Arnold, Nottinghamshire

Arnold was an urban district in the English ceremonial county of Nottinghamshire from 1894 to 1974. It was created under the Local Government Act 1894.

The district was abolished in 1974 under the Local Government Act 1972 and combined with Carlton Urban District and part of Basford Rural District to form the new Gedling district.

== Politics ==
Arnold Urban District Council was controlled by both the Labour Party and Conservative Party during its existence. The table below shows the number of councillors held by each party from 1956 to 1973.

Year	Conservative	Labour	Liberal
1956	7	8	0
1963	5	9	1
1965	4	11	0
1967	5	10	0
1969	15	3	0
1973	6	12	0
