= 2000 Bassetlaw District Council election =

2000 English local election

- 4 May 2000

One third of seats to Bassetlaw District Council (50 seats) 26 seats needed for a majority
- Turnout: 23.5%
	First party	Second party	Third party
	Lab	Con	LD
Party	Labour	Conservative	Liberal Democrats
Seats won	11	5	1
Seats after	31	14	3
Percentage	45.4%	41.8%	9.3%
- No election Colours denote the winning party, as shown in the main table of results.
Council control before election
Labour
Council control after election
Labour

The 2000 Bassetlaw District Council election took place on 4 May 2000 to elect one third of the members of Bassetlaw District Council in Nottinghamshire, England as part of the 2000 United Kingdom local elections.

== Election result ==
One third of seats (17 seats) were up for election with one councillor elected per ward with the exception of East Retford West ward, where two seats were elected due to a by-election being combined with the ordinary election.

The Labour Party won a majority of seats and retained control of the council.

Overall result
Party	Seats (2000)	Seats (Council)	Seats (Change)
Labour	11	31	
Conservative	5	14	
Liberal Democrats	1	3	
Independent	1	2	
Registered electors	63,573		
Votes cast	14,933		
Turnout	23.5%		

== Ward results ==
=== Beckingham ===
Beckingham (1)
Party	Candidate	Votes	%	±%
Conservative	Kenneth Bullivant	454	76.8%	
Labour	Robert Payne	137	23.2%	
Turnout		596	31.7%	
Registered electors		1,878		

=== Carlton ===
Carlton (1)
Party	Candidate	Votes	%	±%
Labour	Alastair Williams	618	51.4%	
Conservative	Edward Banks	585	48.6%	
Turnout		1,205	26.2%	
Registered electors		4,605		

=== Clayworth ===
Clayworth (1)
Party	Candidate	Votes	%	±%
Conservative	Irene Balding	427	77.8%	
Labour	Geoffrey Chapman	122	22.2%	
Turnout		553	34.7%	
Registered electors		1,595		

=== East Retford East ===
East Retford East (1)
Party	Candidate	Votes	%	±%
Conservative	Wendy Quigley	1,048	52.7%	
Liberal Democrats	Elizabeth Dobbie	573	28.8%	
Labour	Pamela Cook	366	18.4%	
Turnout		1,351	35.0%	
Registered electors		5,679		

=== East Retford North ===
East Retford North (1)
Party	Candidate	Votes	%	±%
Labour	Pamela Skelding	700	51.6%	
Conservative	Gordon Morley	657	48.4%	
Turnout		1,351	25.2%	
Registered electors		5,354		

=== East Retford West ===
East Retford West (2)
Party	Candidate	Votes	%	±%
Labour	Michael Storey	655	48.7%	
Labour	Philip Skelding	607		
Liberal Democrats	John Bragger	467	34.7%	
Liberal Democrats	David Dobbie	450		
Conservative	Heather Taylor	223	16.6%	
Conservative	Maureen Trigg	207		
Turnout		1,304	24.4%	
Registered electors		5,354		

=== Elkesley ===
Elkesley (1)
Party	Candidate	Votes	%	±%
Independent	Stanley Moody	Unopposed		

=== Harworth East ===
Harworth East (1)
Party	Candidate	Votes	%	±%
Labour	Margaret Muskett	269	57.8%	
Independent Labour	George Burchby	155	33.3%	
Independent	William Macaulay	41	8.8%	
Turnout		469	17.4%	
Registered electors		2,703		

=== Hodsock ===
Hodsock (1)
Party	Candidate	Votes	%	±%
Labour	Gill Freeman	298	72.0%	
Conservative	Derrick Connolly	116	28.0%	
Turnout		419	22.4%	
Registered electors		1,873		

=== Sutton ===
Sutton (1)
Party	Candidate	Votes	%	±%
Liberal Democrats	Alan Kitchen	406	62.4%	
Conservative	Norman Myers	245	37.6%	
Turnout		654	38.3%	
Registered electors		1,707		

=== Tuxford ===
Tuxford (1)
Party	Candidate	Votes	%	±%
Conservative	Keith Isard	329	50.9%	
Labour	Marilyn McCarthy	318	49.1%	
Turnout		651	34.1%	
Registered electors		1,912		

=== Worksop East ===
Worksop East (1)
Party	Candidate	Votes	%	±%
Labour	James Elliott	635	64.7%	
Independent	Matthew Keywood	346	35.3%	
Turnout		985	21.3%	
Registered electors		4,625		

=== Worksop North ===
Worksop North (1)
Party	Candidate	Votes	%	±%
Labour	Roy Barsley	579	61.4%	
Conservative	Carole Mangham	364	38.6%	
Turnout		952	18.6%	
Registered electors		5,106		

=== Worksop North East ===
Worksop North East (1)
Party	Candidate	Votes	%	±%
Labour	Janet Pimperton	573	50.0%	
Conservative	Philip Bird	572	50.0%	
Turnout		1,155	22.0%	
Registered electors		5,252		

=== Worksop North West ===
Worksop North West (1)
Party	Candidate	Votes	%	±%
Labour	David Pressley	645	65.1%	
Conservative	Richard Durr	346	34.9%	
Turnout		996	21.5%	
Registered electors		4,627		

=== Worksop South ===
Worksop South (1)
Party	Candidate	Votes	%	±%
Conservative	Andrew Dibb	912	62.4%	
Labour	Charles Espin	549	37.6%	
Turnout		1,468	22.6%	
Registered electors		6,501		

=== Worksop South East ===
Worksop South East (1)
Party	Candidate	Votes	%	±%
Labour	Brian Hopkinson	598	72.9%	
Conservative	Juliana Smith	222	27.1%	
Turnout		824	17.2%	
Registered electors		4,802		
