= West Bridgford Urban District =

Urban district in Nottinghamshire

West Bridgford
- West Bridgford Urban District shown within Nottinghamshire in 1970
- Area
  - 1911: 1,123 acres (4.54 km^{2})
  - 1961: 3,046 acres (12.33 km^{2})
- Population
  - 1911: 11,632
  - 1961: 26,973
- History
  - Created: 1894
  - Abolished: 1974
  - Succeeded by: Rushcliffe
- Status: Urban District
- Government: West Bridgford Urban District Council
  - HQ: West Bridgford

West Bridgford was an Urban District in Nottinghamshire, England, from 1894 to 1974. It was created under the Local Government Act 1894.

It was enlarged in 1935 when the part of the civil parishes of South Wilford and Edwalton were transferred to the district.

The district was abolished in 1974 under the Local Government Act 1972 and combined with the Bingham Rural District and the southern detached part of Basford Rural District to form the new Rushcliffe district.

== Bus fleet ==
West Bridgford UDC operated its own fleet of buses from 1914 until 1968. The first five were delivered ready for the opening of the new services on 28 January 1914, but their Dennis chassis were requisitioned by the War Department in November the same year. Their bodywork was retained by the UDC, and fitted to some new chassis bought from Alldays & Onions, of which a total of seven of this make were bought in 1915–16. The next new buses, bought in 1920–1924, had Straker-Squire chassis. These early buses had a short life; mostly four or five years, none lasting more than seven.

In 1926, the first AEC chassis were bought, and from that time on, AEC manufactured virtually all bus chassis for West Bridgford, although some of those delivered during 1927–28 were badged as ADC. The only exceptions to the all-AEC policy were three Daimlers (with AEC engines) built in 1945 – one was bought new, the other two being bought secondhand in 1955. Once AEC became established in the fleet, West Bridgford buses tended to have a long life – those built between 1937 and 1939 all lasted until the 1960s, and five of those built in 1947 lasted until the end of the fleet in 1968.

Bodywork was predominantly double-deck from a variety of coachbuilders, but from 1934, most were built by Park Royal with East Lancs being favoured from 1960. A number of single-deckers were bought in 1926–1928, but no more until 1967 when three East Lancs-bodied AEC Swift were bought, which were also the last buses supplied to the UDC.

To begin with, the UDC buses primarily provided services in West Bridgford, some of which connected to the terminus of the Nottingham Corporation Tramways system at Trent Bridge. Once the Nottingham tramways were converted to motorbus operation, UDC buses began to run into the centre of Nottingham. From 1928, Nottingham City Transport and West Bridgford UDC collaborated on a group of jointly-operated bus routes, where each company provided a proportion of the vehicles and received a share of the receipts. This arrangement became more significant in the 1950s, when new housing developments were constructed at Clifton; until the opening of the Clifton Bridge in 1958, all of the buses running between Nottingham and Clifton needed to cross the river by the Trent Bridge, and thus had to pass through West Bridgford, providing the UDC with a further source of income. The Clifton routes ran along Wilford Lane, which passed beneath a low railway bridge. To suit this, some of the double-deck buses were reconstructed to have a reduced height, and other low-height buses were bought either new or secondhand.

During the 1960s, passenger numbers declined and the buses became less viable. The three AEC Swift single-deckers bought in 1967 had been intended to begin a gradual conversion to one-man operation, but union difficulties meant that they had to be operated with conductors. West Bridgford UDC decided to sell the whole fleet, and the last UDC-owned buses ran on the evening of 28 September 1968. The livery was chocolate and cream, with the fleetname "WBUDC".

The fleet was bought by Nottingham City Transport, and repainted green and cream. At the time, the stock comprised 28 buses, all with AEC chassis; of these, 25 (11 Regent III, 12 Regent V and two Renown) were double-deck and three were single-deck. The two Renowns and three Swifts were still in service with Nottingham in February 1976, but all had been withdrawn by May 1978.
