= Sutton in Ashfield Urban District =

Former local government area in the UK

Sutton in Ashfield
- Sutton in Ashfield Urban District shown within Nottinghamshire in 1970.
- Area
  - 1911: 4,879 acres (19.74 km^{2})
  - 1961: 10,507 acres (42.52 km^{2})
- Population
  - 1911: 21,708
  - 1961: 40,441
- History
  - Created: 1894
  - Abolished: 1974
  - Succeeded by: Ashfield
- Status: Urban District
- Government: Sutton in Ashfield Urban District Council
  - HQ: Sutton-in-Ashfield

Sutton in Ashfield was an Urban District in Nottinghamshire, England, from 1894 to 1974. It was created under the Local Government Act 1894.

In 1935, the district was enlarged with the incorporation of the Huthwaite urban district and the civil parishes of Fulwood, Skegby and Teversal.

The district was abolished in 1974 under the Local Government Act 1972 and merged with Kirkby in Ashfield Urban District, Hucknall Urban District, and part of Basford Rural District to form the new Ashfield district.
