= 2007 Bassetlaw District Council election =

UK local government election

| ← 2006 | 3 May 2007 | 2008 → |

One third of seats to Bassetlaw District Council (16 seats) 25 seats needed for a majority
- Turnout: 32.1%
| | First party | Second party | Third party |
|---|---|---|---|
| | Con | Lab | Ind |
| Party | Conservative | Labour | Independent |
| Seats won | 9 | 6 | 1 |
| Seats after | 27 | 16 | 5 |
| Seat change | ▼1 | ▲2 | Steady |
- No election Colours denote the winning party, as shown in the main table of results.
Council control before election
Conservative
Council control after election
Conservative

The 2007 Bassetlaw District Council election took place on 3 May 2007 to elect members of Bassetlaw District Council in Nottinghamshire, England. One third of the council was up for election.

== Election result ==
The Conservative Party retained control of the council, winning nine of sixteen seats up for election, and twenty-seven seats overall. Notably, the Liberal Democrats lost their only seat on the council to the Conservatives in the Ranskill ward.

Overall result
| Party | Seats (2007) | Seats (Council) | Seats (Change) |
|---|---|---|---|
| Conservative | 9 | 27 | -1 |
| Labour | 6 | 16 | +2 |
| Independent | 1 | 5 | - |
| Registered electors | 62,838 | | |
| Votes cast | 20,181 | | |
| Turnout | 32.1% | | |

== Ward results ==
=== Blyth ===
Blyth
| Party | Candidate | Votes | % | ±% |
|---|---|---|---|---|
| Conservative | Terry Yates | 509 | 74.7% | |
| Labour | Peter Abell | 172 | 25.3% | |
| Turnout | | 681 | 38.4% | |
| Registered electors | | 1,801 | | |

=== Carlton ===
Carlton
| Party | Candidate | Votes | % | ±% |
|---|---|---|---|---|
| Conservative | David Hare | 903 | 52.0% | |
| Labour | Gary Moore | 832 | 48.0% | |
| Turnout | | 1,735 | 37.3% | |
| Registered electors | | 4,663 | | |

=== East Markham ===
East Markham
| Party | Candidate | Votes | % | ±% |
|---|---|---|---|---|
| Conservative | John Ogle | 734 | 83.5% | |
| Labour | Roderick Pickford | 145 | 16.5% | |
| Turnout | | 879 | 47.7% | |
| Registered electors | | 1,843 | | |

=== East Retford East ===
East Retford East
| Party | Candidate | Votes | % | ±% |
|---|---|---|---|---|
| Conservative | Jim Holland | 1,197 | 67.5% | |
| Labour | Pam Skelding | 577 | 32.5% | |
| Turnout | | 1,774 | 32.9% | |
| Registered electors | | 5,483 | | |

=== East Retford North ===
East Retford North
| Party | Candidate | Votes | % | ±% |
|---|---|---|---|---|
| Conservative | Mike Pugsley | 1,094 | 61.4% | |
| Labour | Vaughan Thomas | 689 | 38.6% | |
| Turnout | | 1,783 | 37.7% | |
| Registered electors | | 4,801 | | |

=== Harworth ===
Harworth
| Party | Candidate | Votes | % | ±% |
|---|---|---|---|---|
| Labour | John Clayton | 1,066 | 71.2% | |
| Conservative | Carole Mangham | 431 | 28.8% | |
| Turnout | | 1,497 | 25.9% | |
| Registered electors | | 5,800 | | |

=== Rampton ===
Rampton
| Party | Candidate | Votes | % | ±% |
|---|---|---|---|---|
| Conservative | Jeffery Rickells | Unopposed | | |

=== Ranskill ===
Ranskill
| Party | Candidate | Votes | % | ±% |
|---|---|---|---|---|
| Conservative | Michael Gray | 392 | 57.2% | |
| Labour | Viv Thomas | 152 | 22.2% | |
| Liberal Democrats | Mark Hunter | 141 | 20.6% | |
| Turnout | | 685 | 38.2% | |
| Registered electors | | 1,776 | | |

=== Sturton ===
Sturton
| Party | Candidate | Votes | % | ±% |
|---|---|---|---|---|
| Independent | Hugh Burton | 640 | 83.6% | |
| Labour | Cadell Thomas | 126 | 16.4% | |
| Turnout | | 766 | 43.4% | |
| Registered electors | | 1,775 | | |

=== Welbeck ===
Welbeck
| Party | Candidate | Votes | % | ±% |
|---|---|---|---|---|
| Conservative | Mary Stokes | 401 | 59.1% | |
| Labour | Robin Carrington-Wilde | 277 | 40.9% | |
| Turnout | | 678 | 41.1% | |
| Registered electors | | 1,661 | | |

=== Worksop East ===
Worksop East
| Party | Candidate | Votes | % | ±% |
|---|---|---|---|---|
| Labour | Cliff Entwistle | 953 | 57.9% | |
| Independent | Martin Introna | 692 | 42.1% | |
| Turnout | | 1,645 | 32.5% | |
| Registered electors | | 5,071 | | |

=== Worksop North ===
Worksop North
| Party | Candidate | Votes | % | ±% |
|---|---|---|---|---|
| Labour | Bill Barker | 981 | 55.2% | |
| Conservative | Vicky Wanless | 795 | 44.8% | |
| Turnout | | 1,776 | 27.8% | |
| Registered electors | | 6,412 | | |

=== Worksop North East ===
Worksop North East
| Party | Candidate | Votes | % | ±% |
|---|---|---|---|---|
| Labour | Simon Greaves | 905 | 52.6% | |
| Conservative | Barry Bowles | 816 | 47.4% | |
| Turnout | | 1,721 | 34.2% | |
| Registered electors | | 5,084 | | |

=== Worksop North West ===
Worksop North West
| Party | Candidate | Votes | % | ±% |
|---|---|---|---|---|
| Labour | Alan Rhodes | 893 | 59.0% | |
| Conservative | Tracey Taylor | 621 | 41.0% | |
| Turnout | | 1,514 | 27.5% | |
| Registered electors | | 5,553 | | |

=== Worksop South ===
Worksop South
| Party | Candidate | Votes | % | ±% |
|---|---|---|---|---|
| Conservative | Julie Smith | 1,217 | 67.5% | |
| Labour | Mick Golding | 587 | 32.5% | |
| Turnout | | 1,804 | 33.5% | |
| Registered electors | | 5,466 | | |

=== Worksop South East ===
Worksop South East
| Party | Candidate | Votes | % | ±% |
|---|---|---|---|---|
| Labour | Josie Potts | 917 | 73.8% | |
| Conservative | Philip Smith | 326 | 26.2% | |
| Turnout | | 1,243 | 22.3% | |
| Registered electors | | 5,649 | | |
