= Eastwood Urban District =

Former local government area in the UK

Eastwood
- Eastwood Urban District shown within Nottinghamshire in 1970
- Area
  - 1911: 951 acres (3.85 km^{2})
  - 1961: 1,178 acres (4.77 km^{2})
- Population
  - 1911: 4,692
  - 1961: 10,607
- History
  - Created: 1896
  - Abolished: 1974
  - Succeeded by: Broxtowe
- Status: Urban District
- Government: Eastwood Urban District Council
  - HQ: Eastwood

Eastwood was an Urban District in Nottinghamshire, England, from 1896 to 1974. It was created under the Local Government Act 1894.

It was enlarged in 1935 when part of the Greasley civil parish was transferred to the district from Basford Rural District.

The district was abolished in 1974 under the Local Government Act 1972 and combined with Beeston and Stapleford Urban District and part of Basford Rural District to form the new Broxtowe district.
