= Municipal Borough of Worksop =

Former local government area in the UK

Worksop
- Municipal Borough of Worksop shown within Nottinghamshire in 1970.
- Area
  - 1911: 17,935 acres (72.58 km^{2})
  - 1961: 17,937 acres (72.59 km^{2})
- Population
  - 1911: 20,387
  - 1961: 34,311
- History
  - Created: 1894
  - Abolished: 1974
  - Succeeded by: Bassetlaw
- Status: Urban district: 1894–1931; Municipal borough: 1931–1974
- Government: Worksop Borough Council
  - HQ: Worksop

Worksop was an urban district and municipal borough in Nottinghamshire, England from 1894 to 1974.

It was created as an urban district in 1894 under the Local Government Act 1894 and subsequently elevated to the status of Municipal Borough in 1931.

The borough was abolished in 1974 under the Local Government Act 1972 and combined with the Municipal Borough of East Retford, East Retford Rural District (except Finningley) and Worksop Rural District (except a small area of Harworth parish) to form the new Bassetlaw district.
