= Linby =

Village and civil parish in Nottinghamshire, England

Coordinates: 53.0535°N 1.2043°W

- Village and civil parish
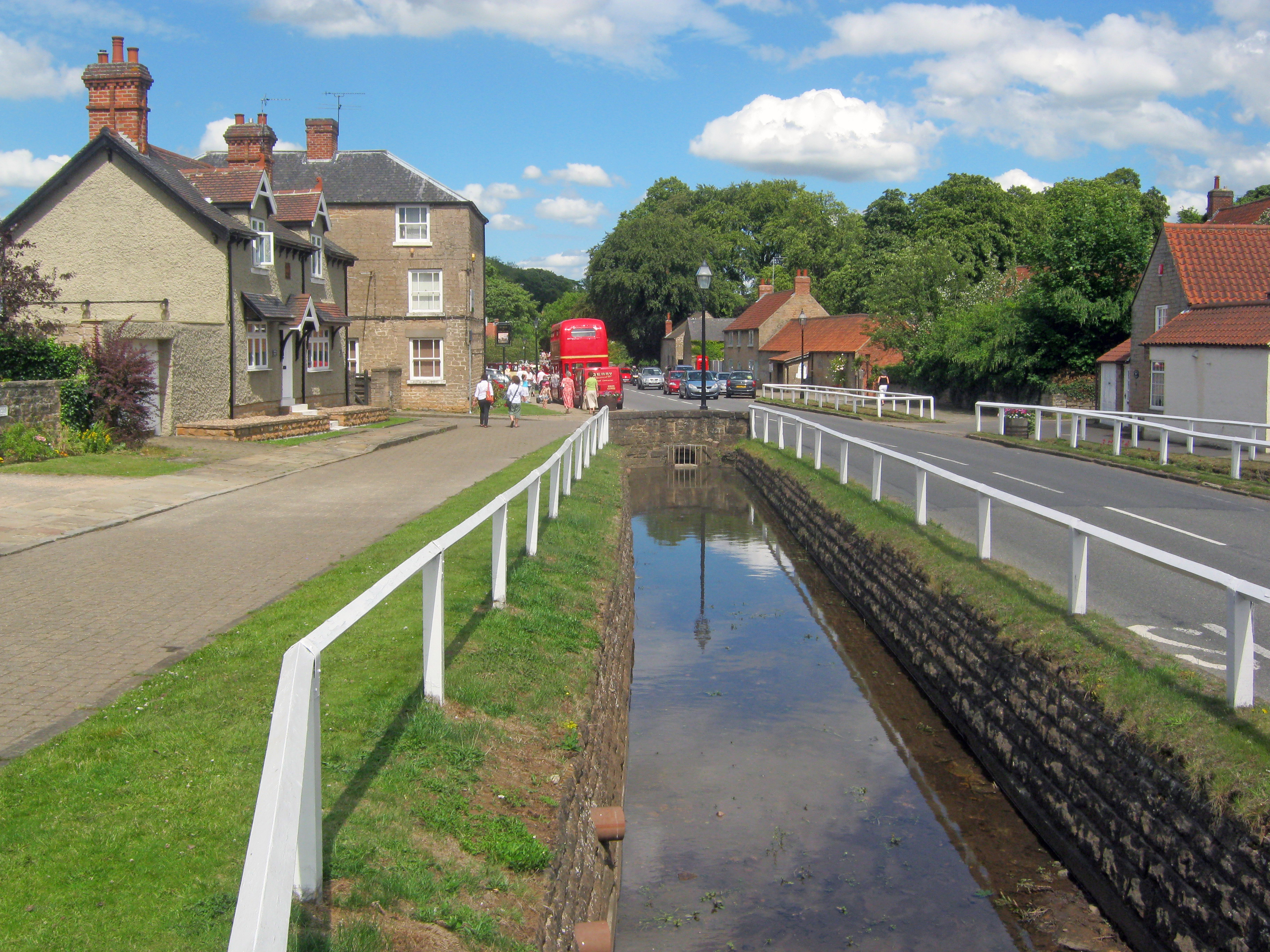
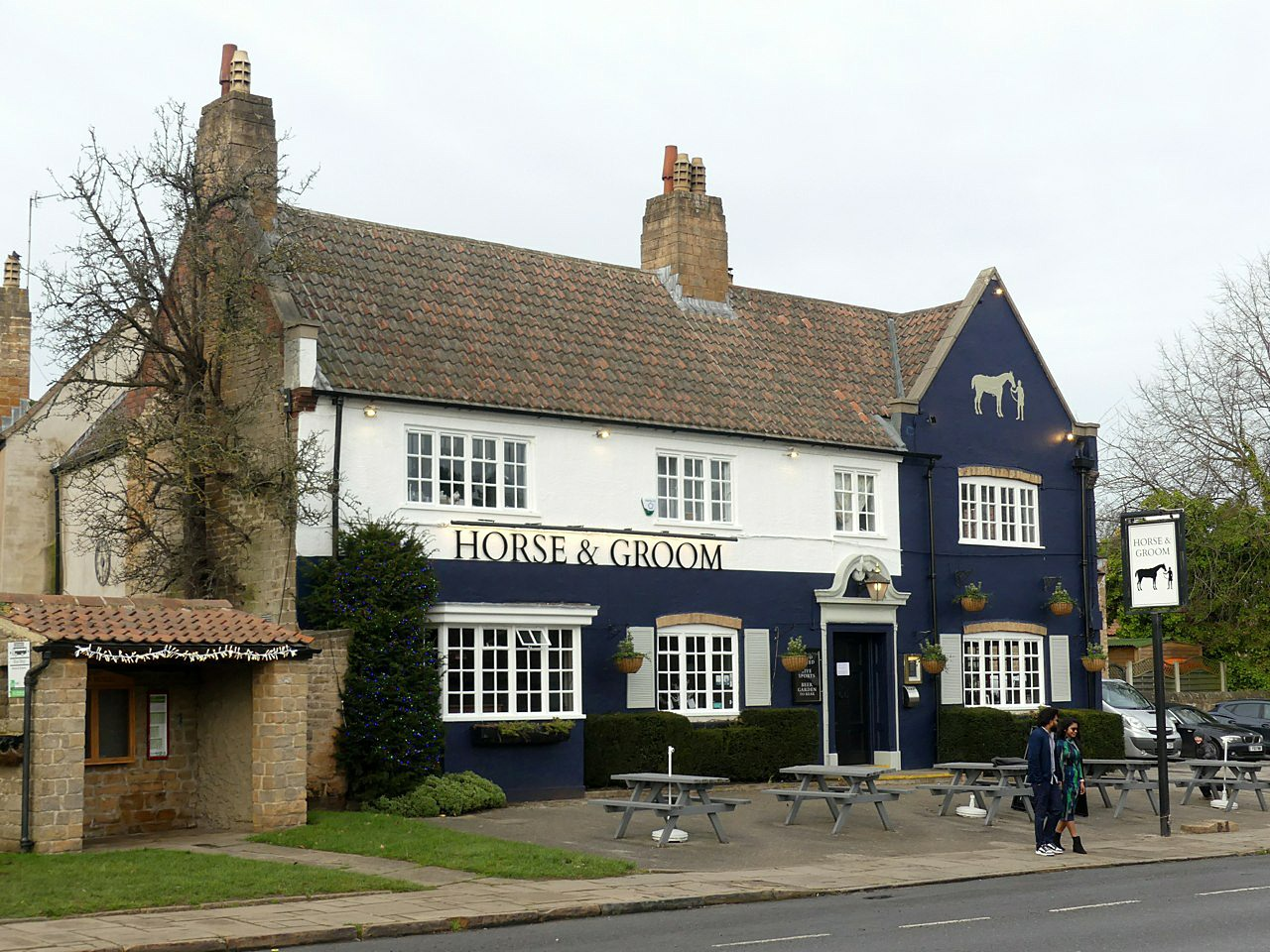
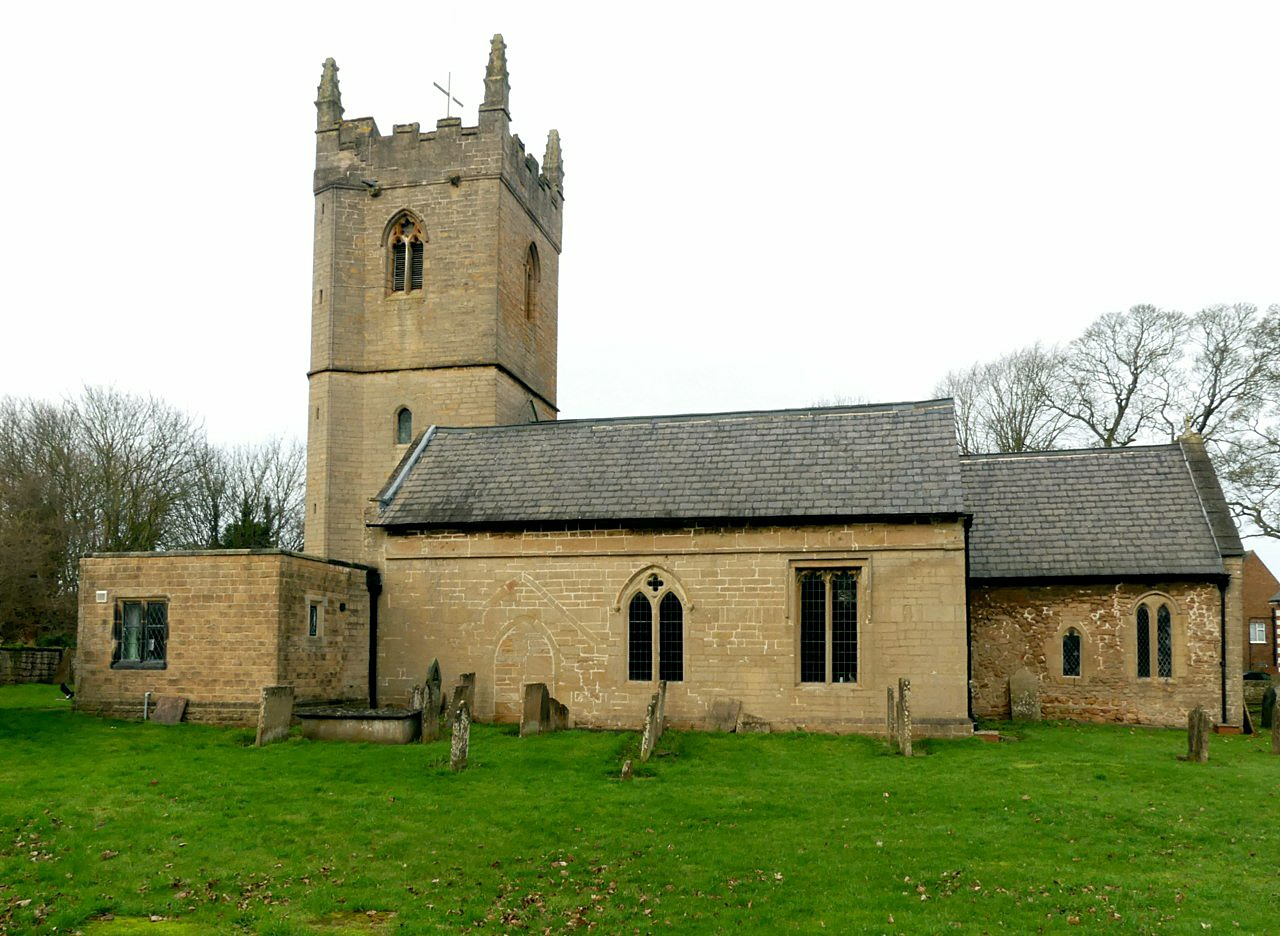
- Main Street Horse and Groom St Michael's Church

- Location within Nottinghamshire
- Interactive map of Linby
- Area: 1.43 sq mi (3.7 km^{2})
- Population: 676 (2021)
  - Density: 473/sq mi (183/km^{2})
- OS grid reference: SK 535510
  - London: 115 mi (185 km) SSE
- District: Borough of Gedling
- Shire county: Nottinghamshire
- Region: East Midlands
- Country: England
- Sovereign state: United Kingdom
- Post town: NOTTINGHAM
- Postcode district: NG15
- Dialling code: 0115
- Police: Nottinghamshire
- Fire: Nottinghamshire
- Ambulance: East Midlands
- UK Parliament: Sherwood
- Website: linbyparishcouncil.co.uk

Linby is a small village and civil parish in Nottinghamshire, England. The nearest town is Hucknall which is immediately to the south-west. The village grew up around the mills on the River Leen, from which Linby's name is derived. Small streams known as Linby Docks run on both sides of the main street. The population of the civil parish at the 2011 census was 232, increasing to 676 at the 2021 census.

== History ==
In the Imperial Gazetteer of England and Wales (1870–72) John Marius Wilson described Linby:

LINBY, or LINDEBY, a village and a parish in Basford district, Notts. The village stands adjacent to the Nottingham and Mansfield railway, near the river Leen, 9¼ miles N by W of Nottingham; has a station on the railway, and a post office under Nottingham; and has Likewise two ancient crosses, which were supposed to mark an entrance-boundary of Sherwood forest.—The parish comprises 1,190 acres. Real property, £2,147; of which £25 are in quarries. Pop. in 1851, 310; in 1861, 257. Houses, 53. The property is not divided. The manor belongs to A. F. W. Montagu, Esq. The living is a rectory in the diocese of Lincoln. Value, £280. I Patron, A. F. W. Montagu, Esq. The church was re.cently restored, has a tower, and contains monuments of the Chaworths.

The local parish church is dedicated to St. Michael and is a Grade II* listed building. Containing a number of features which date to the 13th century, the church has been extended several times, including restorations in the late 19th and early 20th centuries.

There are two crosses in the village. The "Top Cross", a Grade II listed structure, is dated to the 14th century and was restored in the late 19th century. The "Bottom Cross" is inscribed with the date 1663, which was at the time of King Charles II and the restoration.

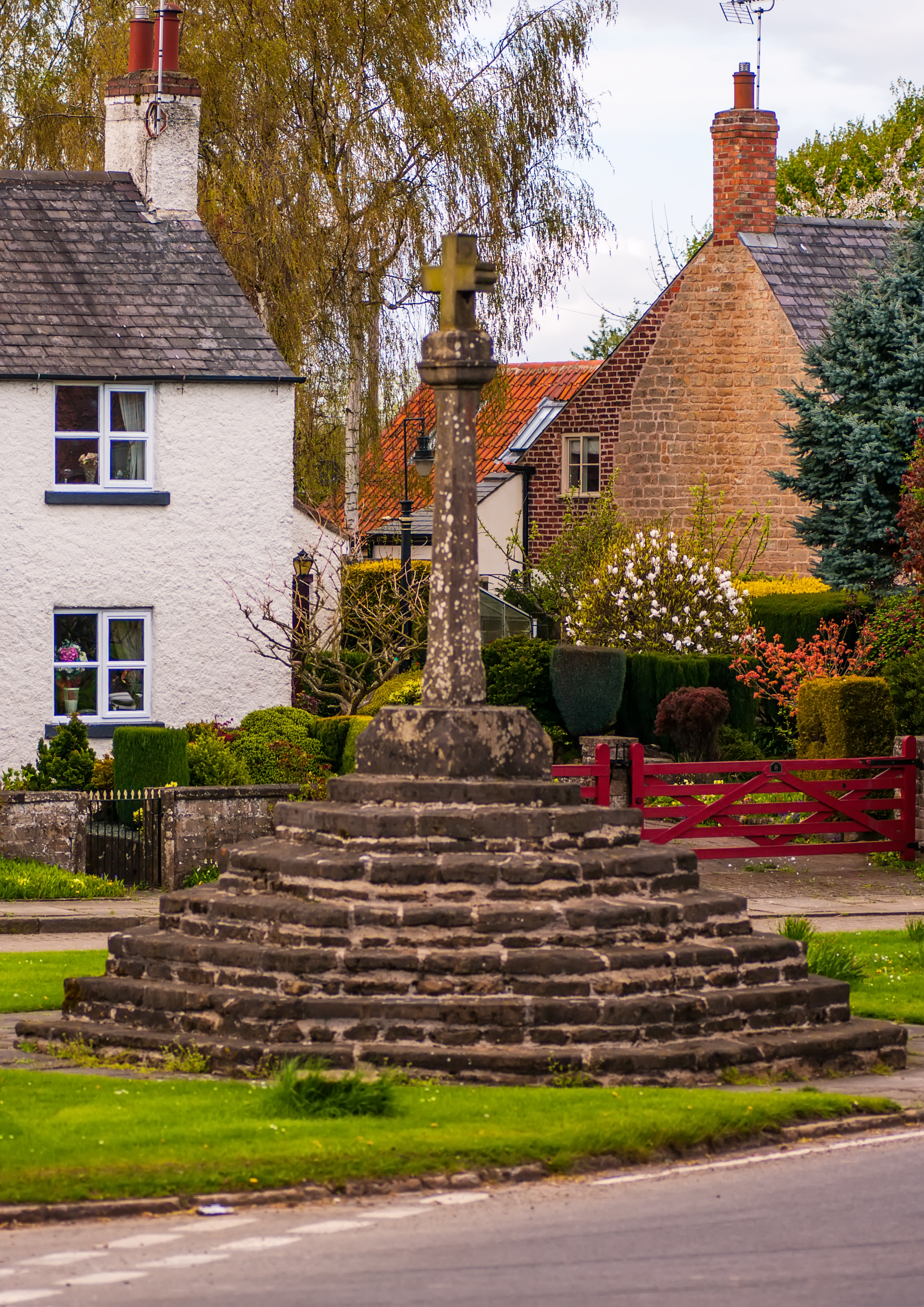
The Top Cross

Linby won Nottinghamshire's "best kept village" award in 2013.

=== Transport ===
The Linby Trail is a 2 km stretch of the National Cycle Route starting at the village and finishing at nearby Newstead Village.

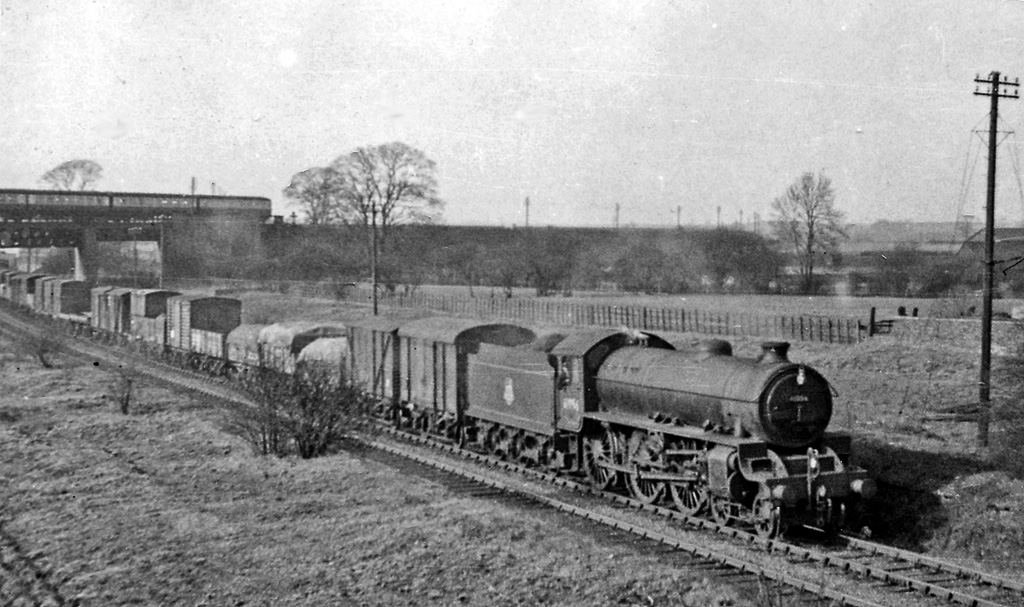
The ex-Great Northern Leen Valley line at Linby where it passed beneath the ex-Great Central Main Line

Three railway lines once passed through Linby, with stations on two of them. The first was the Midland Railway (later part of the LMS) line from Nottingham to Mansfield and Worksop, closed to passengers on 12 October 1964 though partly retained as a freight route serving collieries at Annesley.In the 1990s this line was reopened to passengers in stages, the section through Linby in 1993, but Linby station did not reopen with it.

The second line was the Great Northern Railway (later part of the LNER) route serving many of the same places as the Midland. It closed to passengers on 14 September 1931 but remained in use for freight until 25 March 1968. The Linby station on this line had closed long before, on 1 July 1916.

The third line was the Great Central Railway (also later part of the LNER), the last main line ever built from the north of England to London, opened on 15 March 1899. The stretch through Linby (which crossed over both the other lines), closed completely on 5 September 1966.

== Governance ==
From 1894 to 1974 the village was part of Basford Rural District. It was then transferred to Gedling Borough. However, a small part of the parish had been transferred to Hucknall Urban District Council in 1935.

Linby is included in the Hidden Valleys area of Nottinghamshire.

== Sports ==
The village has a football team, Linby Colliery F.C. of the Central Midlands Alliance Premier Division South

== See also ==
- Listed buildings in Linby
