= Municipal Borough of East Retford =

Former local government area in the UK

East Retford
- Municipal Borough of East Retford within Nottinghamshire in 1970
- Area
  - 1911: 4,656 acres (18.84 km^{2})
  - 1961: 4,656 acres (18.84 km^{2})
- Population
  - 1911: 13,385
  - 1931: 14,229
  - 1961: 17,792
- History
  - Created: 1835
  - Abolished: 1974
  - Succeeded by: Bassetlaw District; East Retford Charter trustees
- Status: Ancient borough: 1105–1835; Municipal borough: 1835–1974
- Government: East Retford Borough Council
  - HQ: East Retford Town Hall
  - Motto: VETUSTAS DIGNITATEM GENERAT (Age Begets Dignity)
- Arms of East Retford Borough Council
- History
  - Established: 1835

East Retford was a Municipal borough in Nottinghamshire, England from 1835 to 1974. It was formed under the Municipal Corporations Act 1835 from the Ancient Borough of East Retford.

The borough survived until 1974 when it was abolished under the Local Government Act 1972, forming part of the new Bassetlaw district of Nottinghamshire. In the same year, the Charter Trustees of East Retford was formed which is made up of all local councillors in Retford. The Charter trustees continue the ceremonial traditions of the old Municipal Borough including the election of a Town Mayor each year.

== Borough Council ==
Year	Conservative councillors	Labour councillors	Independent councillors	Liberal councillors
1947	3	2	18	1
1951	5	2	17	0
1952	3	3	18	0
1953	4	3	17	0
1954	3	4	17	0
1955	2	5	17	0
1956	2	6	16	0
1957	2	5	17	0
1958	2	6	16	0
1960	2	5	16	1
1961	2	5	15	2
1963	2	6	12	4
1964	3	6	11	4
1965	4	5	11	3
1966	9	4	6	5
1967	9	4	9	2
1972	10	10	3	1

=== Wards ===
The Borough was divided into wards for electoral purposes. In 1920 they were:

1. East Ward
2. South Ward
3. West Ward
