= Worksop Rural District =

Former local government area in the UK

Coordinates: 53.38°N 1.05°W

- Worksop Rural District shown within Nottinghamshire in 1970.
- History
  - Created: 1894
  - Abolished: 1974
  - Succeeded by: Bassetlaw; Metropolitan Borough of Doncaster
- Status: Rural District
  - HQ: Worksop

Worksop (previously Blyth and Cuckney) was a Rural District in Nottinghamshire, England.

It originated as Worksop Rural Sanitary District in 1872. In 1894, under the Local Government Act 1894, the Worksop RSD was split to match county borders, with the West Riding of Yorkshire part becoming the Kiveton Park Rural District, and the Derbyshire part becoming Clowne Rural District.

The remainder, in Nottinghamshire, became the Blyth and Cuckney Rural District, taking its name from two of the parishes, Blyth and Cuckney. In 1925 it was renamed Worksop Rural District.

The district consisted of two detached parts, north and south of the town of Worksop. The northern part contained Blyth; the southern contained Cuckney.

The council initially met at the workhouse. In 1928 it bought Highfield House at 222 Carlton Road to serve as its headquarters.

It was abolished in 1974 under the Local Government Act 1972 and now forms part of the Bassetlaw district, with the exception of small areas that are now part of the Metropolitan Borough of Doncaster.
