= Hucknall Urban District =

Former district in Nottinghamshire (1894–1974)

Coordinates: 53.0339°N 1.2013°W

Hucknall
- Hucknall Urban District shown within Nottinghamshire in 1970.
- History
  - Created: 1894
  - Abolished: 1974
  - Succeeded by: Ashfield, Gedling
- Status: Urban District
  - HQ: Hucknall

Hucknall was an urban district in Nottinghamshire, England, from 1894 to 1974.

It was created under the Local Government Act 1894 based on the Hucknall Torkard urban sanitary district. It was centred on the town of Hucknall. In 1935 it gained parts of Linby and Papplewick from the Basford Rural District. Its neighbours were the county borough of Nottingham to the south and the Basford Rural District to the north, east and west.

Since 1974 the town of Hucknall has formed part of the Ashfield district, with Linby and Papplewick becoming part of Gedling.
