= Basford Rural District =

Rural district close to Nottingham, England

Coordinates: 52.9°N 1.15°W

Basford
- Basford Rural District shown within Nottinghamshire in 1970
- History
  - Created: 1894
  - Abolished: 1974
  - Succeeded by: Ashfield, Broxtowe, Gedling, Rushcliffe
- Status: Rural District
  - HQ: Basford, Nottingham

Basford was a rural district close to Nottingham, England, from 1894 to 1974. The district consisted of two detached parts, to the north and south of Nottingham. It was created under the Local Government Act 1894 based on the existing Basford rural sanitary district.

The Nottingham suburb of Basford was not part of the rural district, having been added to Nottingham in 1877.

Bilborough, Wollaton and parts of both Bestwood Park and Colwick were transferred to the City of Nottingham in 1933. The area of Leake Rural District was added to Basford Rural District in 1935.

In 1952 parts of the Clifton with Glapton and Ruddington parishes were also transferred to the City of Nottingham.

In 1974 the district was split between the new non-metropolitan districts of Ashfield, Broxtowe, Gedling and Rushcliffe. The parishes of Annesley, Felley and Selston went to Ashfield; the parishes of Awsworth, Brinsley, Cossall, Greasley, Kimberley, Nuthall, Strelley and Trowell went to Broxtowe; the parishes of Bestwood Park, Burton Joyce, Calverton, Lambley, Linby, Newstead, Papplewick, Stoke Bardolph and Woodborough went to Gedling, and the rest to Rushcliffe including the small towns of Ruddington and Radcliffe on Trent.
