= List of United Kingdom locations: Blad-Bly =

The United Kingdom

This is part of the list of United Kingdom locations: a gazetteer of place names in the United Kingdom showing each place's locality and geographical coordinates.

== Bl (continued) ==
=== Blad-Blay ===
Location	Locality	Coordinates (links to map & photo sources)	OS grid reference
Bladbean	Kent	51.18°N 01.10°E	TR1747
Blades	North Yorkshire	54.37°N 02.03°W	SD9898
Bladnoch	Dumfries and Galloway	54.85°N 04.46°W	NX4254
Bladon	Oxfordshire	51.82°N 01.36°W	SP4414
Blaenannerch	Ceredigion	52.11°N 04.57°W	SN2449
Blaenau	Carmarthenshire	51.80°N 04.03°W	SN6014
Blaenau	Flintshire	53.08°N 03.13°W	SJ2455
Blaenau Dolwyddelan	Conwy	53.04°N 03.94°W	SH7051
Blaenau Ffestiniog	Gwynedd	52.98°N 03.93°W	SH7045
Blaenavon	Torfaen	51.77°N 03.08°W	SO2509
Blaenbedw Fawr	Ceredigion	52.13°N 04.39°W	SN3651
Blaencaerau	Bridgend	51.63°N 03.64°W	SS8694
Blaencelyn	Ceredigion	52.15°N 04.41°W	SN3554
Blaen Clydach	Rhondda, Cynon, Taff	51.62°N 03.47°W	SS9893
Blaencwm	Rhondda, Cynon, Taff	51.67°N 03.56°W	SS9298
Blaenffos	Pembrokeshire	52.00°N 04.63°W	SN190371
Blaengarw	Bridgend	51.61°N 03.59°W	SS9092
Blaengwrach	Neath Port Talbot	51.73°N 03.65°W	SN8605
Blaengwynfi	Neath Port Talbot	51.65°N 03.60°W	SS8996
Blaenllechau	Rhondda, Cynon, Taff	51.66°N 03.46°W	SS9997
Blaen-pant	Ceredigion	52.06°N 04.55°W	SN2544
Blaenpennal	Ceredigion	52.25°N 04.02°W	SN6264
Blaenplwyf	Ceredigion	52.35°N 04.10°W	SN5775
Blaenporth	Ceredigion	52.10°N 04.54°W	SN2648
Blaenrhondda	Rhondda, Cynon, Taff	51.67°N 03.56°W	SS9299
Blaen-waun	Ceredigion	52.15°N 04.35°W	SN3953
Blaenwaun	Carmarthenshire	51.91°N 04.57°W	SN2327
Blaen-y-cwm	Blaenau Gwent	51.79°N 03.26°W	SO1311
Blagdon	Devon	50.43°N 03.62°W	SX8561
Blagdon	Somerset	51.31°N 02.71°W	ST5058
Blagdon Hill	Somerset	50.95°N 03.12°W	ST2118
Blagill	Cumbria	54.81°N 02.42°W	NY7347
Blaguegate	Lancashire	53.54°N 02.83°W	SD4506
Blaich	Highland	56.83°N 05.23°W	NN0376
Blain	Highland	56.75°N 05.81°W	NM6769
Blaina	Blaenau Gwent	51.76°N 03.17°W	SO1908
Blair	Fife	56.13°N 03.11°W	NT3194
Blair Atholl	Perth and Kinross	56.76°N 03.85°W	NN8765
Blairbeg	North Ayrshire	55.53°N 05.13°W	NS0231
Blairburn	Fife	56.05°N 03.64°W	NS9886
Blair Drummond	Stirling	56.15°N 04.04°W	NS7398
Blairgowrie	Perth and Kinross	56.59°N 03.35°W	NO1745
Blairhall	Fife	56.08°N 03.60°W	NT0089
Blairhill	North Lanarkshire	55.86°N 04.04°W	NS7265
Blairingone	Perth and Kinross	56.14°N 03.64°W	NS9896
Blairland	North Ayrshire	55.69°N 04.72°W	NS2948
Blairlinn	North Lanarkshire	55.92°N 04.00°W	NS7572
Blairlogie	Stirling	56.14°N 03.90°W	NS8296
Blairmore	Highland	58.48°N 05.10°W	NC1959
Blairmore	Argyll and Bute	55.99°N 04.90°W	NS1982
Blairninich	Highland	57.59°N 04.52°W	NH4959
Blairskaith	East Dunbartonshire	55.94°N 04.25°W	NS5975
Blaisdon	Gloucestershire	51.84°N 02.43°W	SO7016
Blaise Hamlet	City of Bristol	51.49°N 02.64°W	ST5578
Blakebrook	Worcestershire	52.38°N 02.28°W	SO8176
Blakedown	Worcestershire	52.40°N 02.19°W	SO8778
Blake End	Essex	51.87°N 00.46°E	TL7022
Blakelands	Milton Keynes	52.06°N 00.74°W	SP8642
Blakelaw	Newcastle upon Tyne	54.98°N 01.67°W	NZ2166
Blakeley	Staffordshire	52.52°N 02.20°W	SO8692
Blakeley Lane	Staffordshire	53.02°N 02.04°W	SJ9747
Blakelow	Cheshire	53.05°N 02.47°W	SJ6851
Blakemere	Herefordshire	52.05°N 02.93°W	SO3640
Blakenall Heath	Walsall	52.60°N 02.00°W	SK0001
Blakeney	Gloucestershire	51.75°N 02.49°W	SO6606
Blakeney	Norfolk	52.94°N 01.00°E	TG0243
Blakenhall	Wolverhampton	52.57°N 02.13°W	SO9197
Blakenhall	Cheshire	53.01°N 02.41°W	SJ7247
Blakeshall	Worcestershire	52.42°N 02.25°W	SO8381
Blakesley	Northamptonshire	52.14°N 01.09°W	SP6250
Blanchland	Northumberland	54.84°N 02.06°W	NY9650
Blandford Camp	Dorset	50.87°N 02.12°W	ST915078
Blandford Forum	Dorset	50.85°N 02.17°W	ST8806
Blandford St Mary	Dorset	50.84°N 02.17°W	ST8805
Bland Hill	North Yorkshire	53.97°N 01.69°W	SE2053
Blandy	Highland	58.49°N 04.36°W	NC6259
Blanefield	Stirling	55.98°N 04.32°W	NS5579
Blanerne	Scottish Borders	55.79°N 02.27°W	NT8356
Blankney	Lincolnshire	53.12°N 00.41°W	TF0660
Blannicombe	Devon	50.76°N 03.20°W	SY1597
Blantyre	South Lanarkshire	55.78°N 04.10°W	NS6857
Blarbuie	Argyll and Bute	56.04°N 05.42°W	NR8789
Blarmachfoldach	Highland	56.77°N 05.12°W	NN0969
Blarnalearoch	Highland	57.86°N 05.13°W	NH1490
Blasford Hill	Essex	51.77°N 00.46°E	TL7011
Blashaval	Western Isles	57.61°N 07.21°W	NF8970
Blashford	Hampshire	50.85°N 01.78°W	SU1506
Blaster Hole	Orkney Islands	58.90°N 02.66°W	HY619025
Blaston	Leicestershire	52.54°N 00.82°W	SP8095
Blatchbridge	Somerset	51.20°N 02.33°W	ST7745
Blatherwycke	Northamptonshire	52.54°N 00.57°W	SP9795
Blawith	Cumbria	54.28°N 03.10°W	SD2888
Blaxhall	Suffolk	52.16°N 01.44°E	TM3657
Blaxton	Doncaster	53.49°N 00.99°W	SE6700
Blaydon	Gateshead	54.95°N 01.73°W	NZ1762
Blaydon Burn	Gateshead	54.95°N 01.75°W	NZ1662
Blaydon Haughs	Gateshead	54.96°N 01.70°W	NZ1963

=== Ble ===
Location	Locality	Coordinates (links to map & photo sources)	OS grid reference
Bleach Green	Suffolk	52.34°N 01.27°E	TM2377
Bleach Green	Cumbria	54.55°N 03.57°W	NX9819
Bleadney	Somerset	51.20°N 02.74°W	ST4845
Bleadon	Somerset	51.29°N 02.94°W	ST3456
Bleak Acre	Herefordshire	52.13°N 02.58°W	SO6049
Bleak Hall	Milton Keynes	52.01°N 00.76°W	SP8536
Bleak Hey Nook	Oldham	53.57°N 02.00°W	SE0009
Bleak Hill	Hampshire	50.89°N 01.81°W	SU1311
Blean	Kent	51.29°N 01.04°E	TR1260
Bleasby	Lincolnshire	53.34°N 00.30°W	TF1384
Bleasby	Nottinghamshire	53.03°N 00.94°W	SK7149
Bleasby Moor	Lincolnshire	53.33°N 00.31°W	TF1283
Bleasdale	Lancashire	53.89°N 02.65°W	SD5745
Bleatarn	Cumbria	54.51°N 02.41°W	NY7313
Bleddfa	Powys	52.30°N 03.17°W	SO2068
Bledington	Gloucestershire	51.89°N 01.65°W	SP2422
Bledlow	Buckinghamshire	51.71°N 00.88°W	SP7702
Bledlow Ridge	Buckinghamshire	51.66°N 00.85°W	SU7997
Bleet	Wiltshire	51.32°N 02.15°W	ST8958
Blegbury	Devon	51.00°N 04.52°W	SS2326
Blencarn	Cumbria	54.67°N 02.57°W	NY6331
Blencogo	Cumbria	54.81°N 03.26°W	NY1947
Blendon	Bexley	51.447°N 00.124°E	TQ478742
Blendworth	Hampshire	50.91°N 00.99°W	SU7113
Blenheim (Garsington)	Oxfordshire	51.71°N 01.17°W	SP5702
Blenheim (Horspath)	Oxfordshire	51.74°N 01.17°W	SP5705
Blenkinsopp Hall	Northumberland	54.97°N 02.50°W	NY6864
Blennerhasset	Cumbria	54.75°N 03.29°W	NY1741
Bletchingdon	Oxfordshire	51.84°N 01.27°W	SP5017
Bletchingley	Surrey	51.23°N 00.09°W	TQ3350
Bletchley	Milton Keynes	51.99°N 00.74°W	SP8634
Bletchley	Shropshire	52.89°N 02.56°W	SJ6233
Bletherston	Pembrokeshire	51.85°N 04.81°W	SN0621
Bletsoe	Bedfordshire	52.21°N 00.50°W	TL0258
Blewbury	Oxfordshire	51.56°N 01.23°W	SU5385

=== Bli ===
Location	Locality	Coordinates (links to map & photo sources)	OS grid reference
Bliby	Kent	51.09°N 00.88°E	TR0237
Blickling	Norfolk	52.80°N 01.21°E	TG1728
Blidworth	Nottinghamshire	53.09°N 01.12°W	SK5956
Blidworth Bottoms	Nottinghamshire	53.08°N 01.12°W	SK5954
Blidworth Dale	Nottinghamshire	53.07°N 01.15°W	SK5753
Blindcrake	Cumbria	54.69°N 03.33°W	NY1434
Blindley Heath	Surrey	51.18°N 00.05°W	TQ3645
Blindmoor	Somerset	50.92°N 03.05°W	ST2614
Blinkbonny	Fife	56.34°N 03.18°W	NO2718
Blisland	Cornwall	50.52°N 04.68°W	SX1073
Blissford	Hampshire	50.91°N 01.75°W	SU1713
Bliss Gate	Worcestershire	52.34°N 02.38°W	SO7472
Blists Hill	Shropshire	52.62°N 02.45°W	SJ6903
Blisworth	Northamptonshire	52.17°N 00.94°W	SP7253
Blithbury	Staffordshire	52.77°N 01.88°W	SK0820
Blitterlees	Cumbria	54.85°N 03.40°W	NY1052

=== Blo ===
Location	Locality	Coordinates (links to map & photo sources)	OS grid reference
Blockley	Gloucestershire	52.00°N 01.76°W	SP1634
Blofield	Norfolk	52.62°N 01.44°E	TG3309
Blofield Heath	Norfolk	52.64°N 01.42°E	TG3211
Blo' Norton	Norfolk	52.37°N 00.95°E	TM0179
Bloodman's Corner	Suffolk	52.53°N 01.69°E	TM5199
Bloomfield	Sandwell	52.53°N 02.07°W	SO9593
Bloomfield (Bath)	Bath and North East Somerset	51.36°N 02.37°W	ST7463
Bloomfield (Timsbury)	Bath and North East Somerset	51.32°N 02.48°W	ST6659
Bloomsbury	Camden	51.52°N 00.12°W	TQ3082
Blore (Staffordshire Moorlands)	Staffordshire	53.03°N 01.80°W	SK1349
Blore (Newcastle-under-Lyme)	Staffordshire	52.90°N 02.41°W	SJ7234
Bloreheath	Staffordshire	52.91°N 02.43°W	SJ7135
Blossomfield	Solihull	52.40°N 01.81°W	SP1378
Blount's Green	Staffordshire	52.88°N 01.89°W	SK0732
Blowick	Sefton	53.63°N 02.98°W	SD3516
Blowinghouse	Cornwall	50.31°N 05.17°W	SW7451
Bloxham	Oxfordshire	52.01°N 01.37°W	SP4335
Bloxwich	Walsall	52.61°N 02.01°W	SJ9902
Bloxworth	Dorset	50.74°N 02.17°W	SY8894

=== Blu ===
Location	Locality	Coordinates (links to map & photo sources)	OS grid reference
Blubberhouses	North Yorkshire	53.99°N 01.75°W	SE1655
Blue Anchor	Somerset	51.17°N 03.40°W	ST0243
Blue Anchor	Cornwall	50.37°N 04.94°W	SW9157
Blue Anchor	Swansea	51.63°N 04.11°W	SS5495
Bluebell	Shropshire	52.68°N 02.60°W	SJ5910
Blue Bell Hill	Kent	51.33°N 00.49°E	TQ7462
Bluecairn	Scottish Borders	55.66°N 02.74°W	NT5341
Blue Hill	Hertfordshire	51.86°N 00.12°W	TL2920
Bluetown	Kent	51.28°N 00.73°E	TQ9158
Blue Town	Kent	51.44°N 00.74°E	TQ9175
Blue Vein	Wiltshire	51.40°N 02.24°W	ST8367
Blundellsands	Sefton	53.48°N 03.05°W	SJ3099
Blundeston	Suffolk	52.51°N 01.69°E	TM5197
Blundies	Staffordshire	52.48°N 02.26°W	SO8287
Blunham	Bedfordshire	52.14°N 00.32°W	TL1551
Blunsdon St Andrew	Swindon	51.59°N 01.81°W	SU1389
Bluntington	Worcestershire	52.36°N 02.16°W	SO8974
Bluntisham	Cambridgeshire	52.34°N -00.00°E	TL3674
Blunts	Cornwall	50.44°N 04.33°W	SX3463
Blunt's Green	Warwickshire	52.31°N 01.81°W	SP1368
Bluntshay	Dorset	50.76°N 02.83°W	SY4197
Blurton	City of Stoke-on-Trent	52.97°N 02.16°W	SJ8942

=== Bly ===
Location	Locality	Coordinates (links to map & photo sources)	OS grid reference
Blyborough	Lincolnshire	53.43°N 00.60°W	SK9394
Blyford	Suffolk	52.32°N 01.55°E	TM4276
Blymhill	Staffordshire	52.70°N 02.29°W	SJ8012
Blymhill Lawn	Staffordshire	52.69°N 02.28°W	SJ8111
Blyth	Northumberland	55.12°N 01.53°W	NZ3081
Blyth	Nottinghamshire	53.37°N 01.06°W	SK6287
Blyth	Scottish Borders	55.69°N 03.38°W	NT1345
Blyth Bridge	Scottish Borders	55.69°N 03.38°W	NT1345
Blythburgh	Suffolk	52.31°N 01.59°E	TM4575
Blythe	Scottish Borders	55.73°N 02.67°W	NT5849
Blythe Bridge	Staffordshire	52.96°N 02.07°W	SJ9541
Blythe Marsh	Staffordshire	52.96°N 02.06°W	SJ9641
Blyth End	Warwickshire	52.50°N 01.69°W	SP2190
Blythswood	Renfrewshire	55.88°N 04.39°W	NS5068
Blyton	Lincolnshire	53.43°N 00.72°W	SK8594
