= Blandy =

Blandy may refer to:

== Places ==
- Blandy, Essonne, in the Essonne department
- Blandy, Seine-et-Marne, in the Seine-et-Marne department
- Blandy, Highland, a location in the highlands of Scotland, U.K.

== People ==
- David Blandy (born 1976), British artist
- Mary Blandy (1720–1752), English murderer
- Stella Blandy (1836-1925), French woman of letters, feminist
- William H. P. Blandy (1890–1954), American admiral
