= Listed buildings in Blidworth =

Blidworth is a civil parish in the Newark and Sherwood district of Nottinghamshire, England. The parish contains nine listed buildings that are recorded in the National Heritage List for England. Of these, one is at Grade II*, the middle of the three grades, and the others are at Grade II, the lowest grade. The parish contains the village of Blidworth and the surrounding area. The listed buildings consist of a church, headstones in the churchyard and its gateway, a house and associated features, a farmhouse, a former windmill, and a well head.

== Key ==
Grade	Criteria
II*	Particularly important buildings of more than special interest
II	Buildings of national importance and special interest

== Buildings ==
Name and location	Photograph	Date	Notes	Grade
Row of eight headstones and a memorial cross 53.09445°N 1.12693°W	—	14th century	The headstones and cross are in the churchyard of the Church of St Mary of the Purification to the south of the church. The headstones date from the 17th and 18th centuries, and have arched or decoratively shaped heads. The cross consists of part of a 14th-century octagonal column, the upper parts dating from the 19th century.	II
Church of St Mary of the Purification; 53.09472°N 1.12684°W		15th century	The nave and the south aisle were rebuilt in 1739, and there were further alterations in 1839–40. The church is built in stone with lead roofs, and consists of a nave with a clerestory, a south aisle with a south porch, a chancel with a south vestry and porch, and a west tower. The tower has a deep chamfered plinth, two stages, clock faces, paired bell openings, and an embattled parapet with corner pinnacles. Along the body of the church are embattled parapets, and the windows have round-arched heads, architraves, imposts and keystones. In the north wall of the nave are re-set stones depicting grotesque medieval faces.	II*
Row of 17 headstones 53.09475°N 1.12663°W	—	17th century	The headstones are in the churchyard of the Church of St Mary of the Purification to the east of the chancel. They date from the 17th, 18th and 19th centuries, and are in stone with arched or decoratively shaped heads. One of the headstones also has foliate decoration.	II
Fountain Dale, outbuilding, wall and gate pier 53.10458°N 1.15561°W	—	17th century	The front of the house is in roughcast red brick, and it has a hipped slate roof. There are two storeys and three bays, the middle bay canted The central doorway has a fanlight and the windows are sashes, all with Gothick glazing. At the rear is a higher two-storey range, and to its right is a single-storey single-bay range, both with a hipped roof. Projecting from the left is a two-storey brick outbuilding with dogtooth eaves and a hipped roof, and at the rear is a coped stone wall and a gate pier with shaped coping.	II
Haywood Oaks Farmhouse; 53.08928°N 1.10183°W		Late 18th century	The original part is in rendered red brick, a wing added in 1871 is in stone, and both parts are on plinths. The farmhouse has a floor band, dentilled eaves, and a slate roof with coped gables and kneelers. There are two storeys and attics, and seven bays, the left bay taller and gabled. The doorway has a decorative fanlight, and to the left is an open porch with round arches on two sides. The windows are sashes, and in the left wing is a two-storey canted bay window.	II
The Windmill; 53.09564°N 1.12664°W	—	c. 1818	The former windmill is in red brick, partly rendered and partly tarred, on a stone plinth, and without a roof. There is a circular plan and three storeys, and it contains two doorways, and windows in each floor.	II
Gateway, Church of St Mary of the Purification; 53.09484°N 1.12667°W		Early 19th century	The gateway consists of pilasters 2 metres (6 ft 7 in) high with a moulded entablature carrying a shallow inscribed pediment. Between them are wrought iron gates decorated with open tracery.	II
Steps and gateway, Fountain Dale; 53.10453°N 1.15489°W	—	Early 19th century	In the garden to the southeast of the house is a flight of steps leading to a decorative wrought iron gate flanked by similar panels. Outside these are stone gate piers on bases with inset panels, surmounted by shaped coping and obelisks.	II
Friar Tuck's Well; 53.10666°N 1.15237°W		Early 19th century	This consists of a shaped and moulded stone water course with six steps, over which is a well head in stone and brick. Adjacent is a stone trough and low red brick walls flanking the outlet.	II
