= Church of St Mary of the Purification, Blidworth =

Church in Nottinghamshire, England

Coordinates: 53°05′39″N 01°07′36″W

St Mary's, Blidworth
- St Mary of the Purification, Blidworth
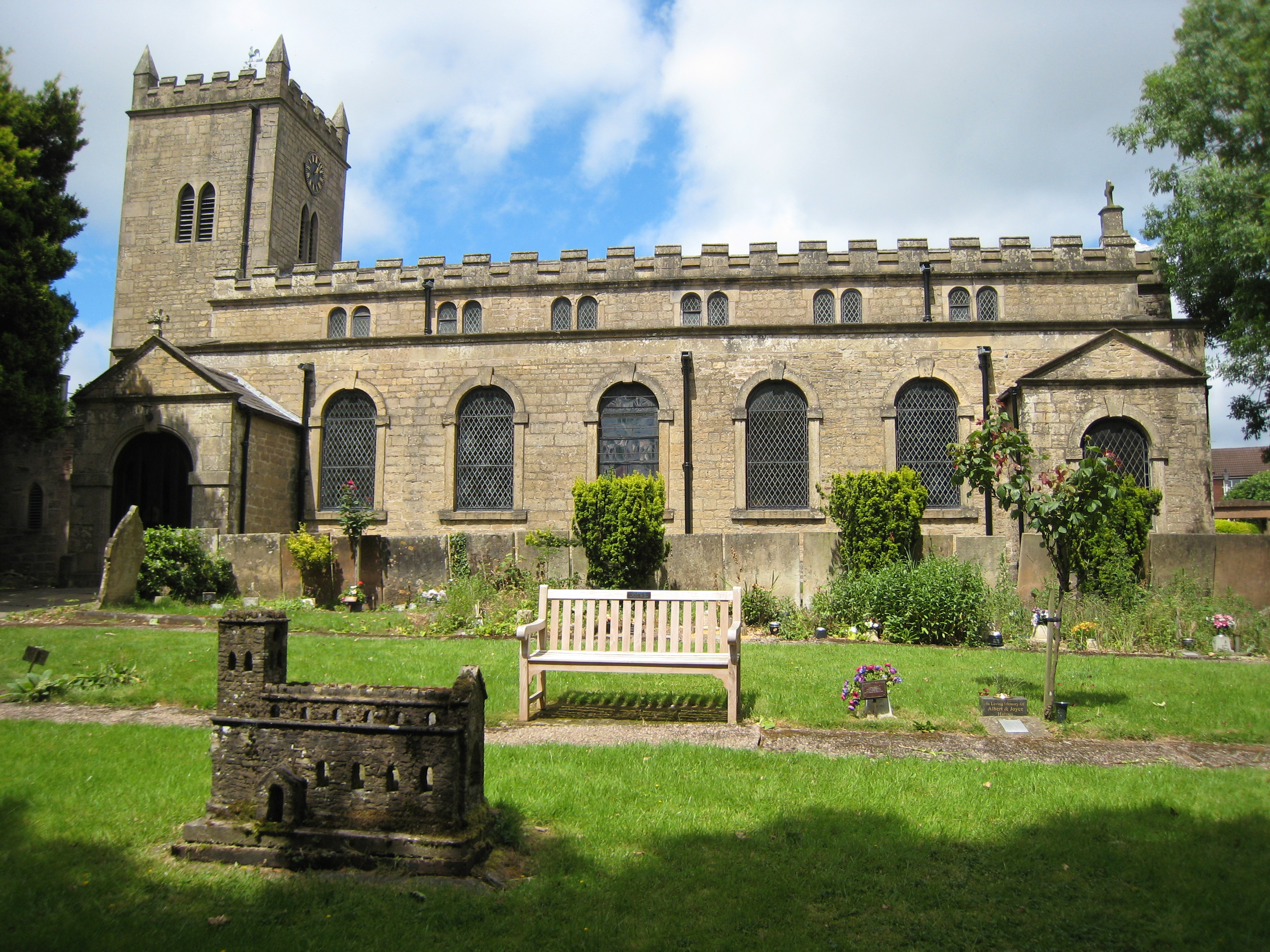
- With 1963 model of the earlier church in foreground
- St Mary's, Blidworth
- Denomination: Church of England
- Churchmanship: Broad Church

History
- Dedication: St Mary

Administration
- Province: York
- Diocese: Southwell and Nottingham
- Parish: Blidworth

Clergy
- Vicar: Revd. Zoe Burton

The Church of St Mary of the Purification is a parish church of the Church of England in Blidworth, Nottinghamshire, dating from the 15th century. It is a Grade II* listed building.

== Building ==
Only the west tower from the medieval (15th century) church survives. The rest was built in 1739 by Rhodes of Barlborough and 1839 by Colvin. It is of ashlar with a lead roof. The graveyard includes a 1963 model of the earlier church. The clock tower has two clocks, one facing West, the other East which would be visible to people approaching from either direction along Main Street.

== Organ ==
The original pipe organ was dilapidated so in 2012 it was replaced by an electronic version made to fit within the existing carved cabinetry, to give an authentic appearance when viewed from the nave. A bespoke installation, the local parish director of music and the Rector Chori of Southwell Minster were consulted beforehand to conclude the specifications needed to achieve their desired sounds.

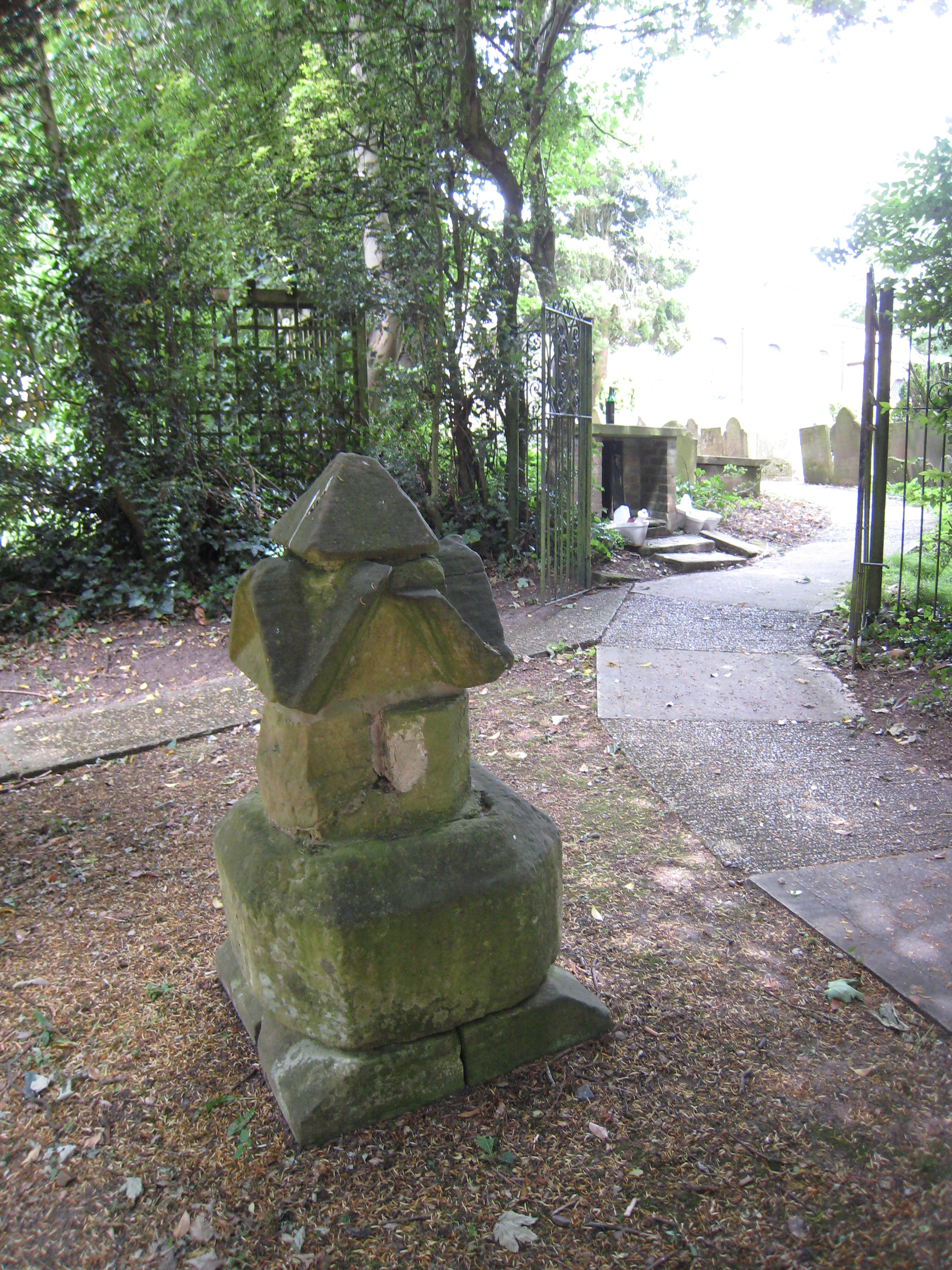
Will Scarlet grave marker

== Notable burials ==
The church is reputed to be the burial place of Will Scarlet. The place is not known, but a piece of the earlier church serves as a memorial.

Sgt. Michael Willetts, George Cross, one of the first British soldiers killed during the Troubles in Northern Ireland who gave his life to protect two children and two adults form a bomb blast is also buried in the Graveyard.

== Rocking Ceremony ==
The Church of St Mary of the Purification is the only church that is known to continue to hold an annual Rocking Ceremony during which a baby boy, born nearest to Christmas Day and having married, Christian parents living in Blidworth, is "rocked" in a flower-decorated cradle on the Feast of the Purification of Mary, which is on the Sunday nearest to Candlemas.

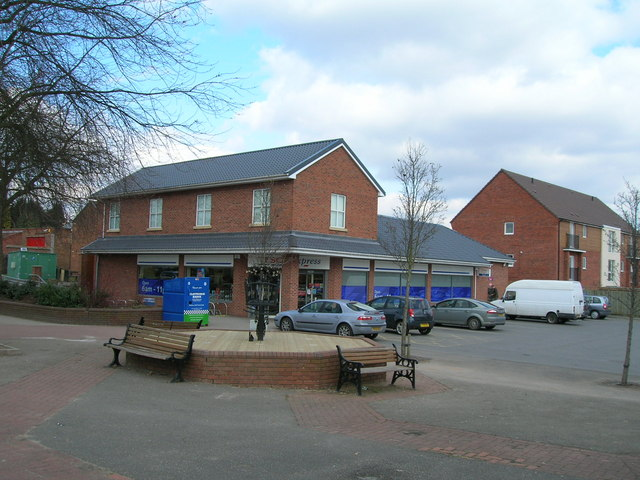
Metal replica of the St Mary's cradle mounted on a brick plinth in Blidworth village centre

The ceremony is a symbolic enactment of the story from the Bible found in Luke's gospel, depicting the Presentation of Christ at a temple. It is thought to have started in the 13th century, but was banned from 1600. The custom was revived in 1842 by the vicar, John Lowndes but then fell out of use. It was revived again in 1922, and has been using the same cradle since then.

All of the babies who have taken part in the Rocking Ceremonies have their names recorded upon a plaque at the rear of St Mary's Church with their full name and the year in which they were 'Rocked'. In 2010 a replica of a rocking cradle was sculpted by Morris Reddington to celebrate the custom. In 2012, Nottinghamshire County Council, after input from Blidworth Parish Council, provided a plaque telling the story to add to the sculpture's mounting-plinth.

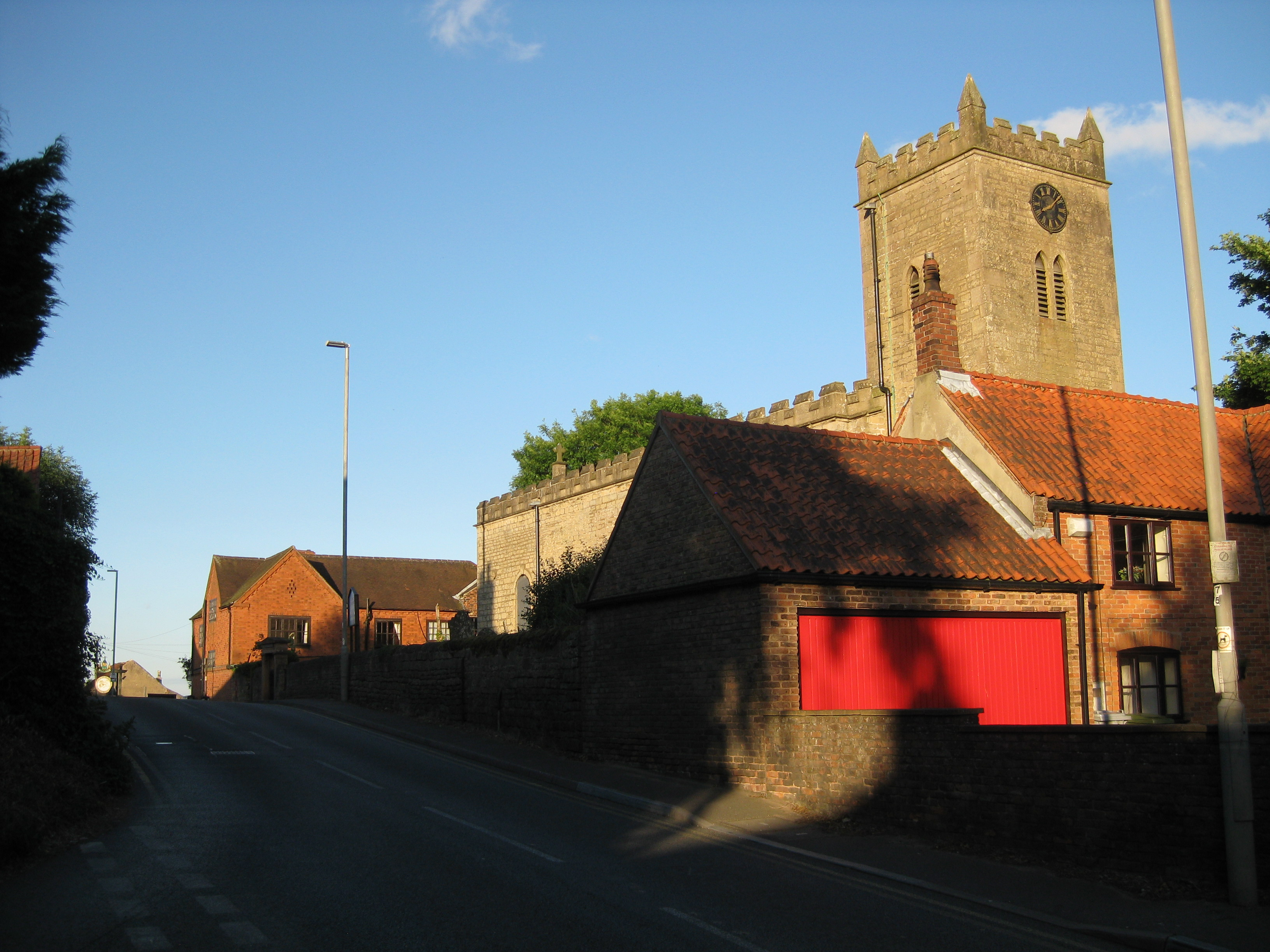
West clock face viewed along Main Street

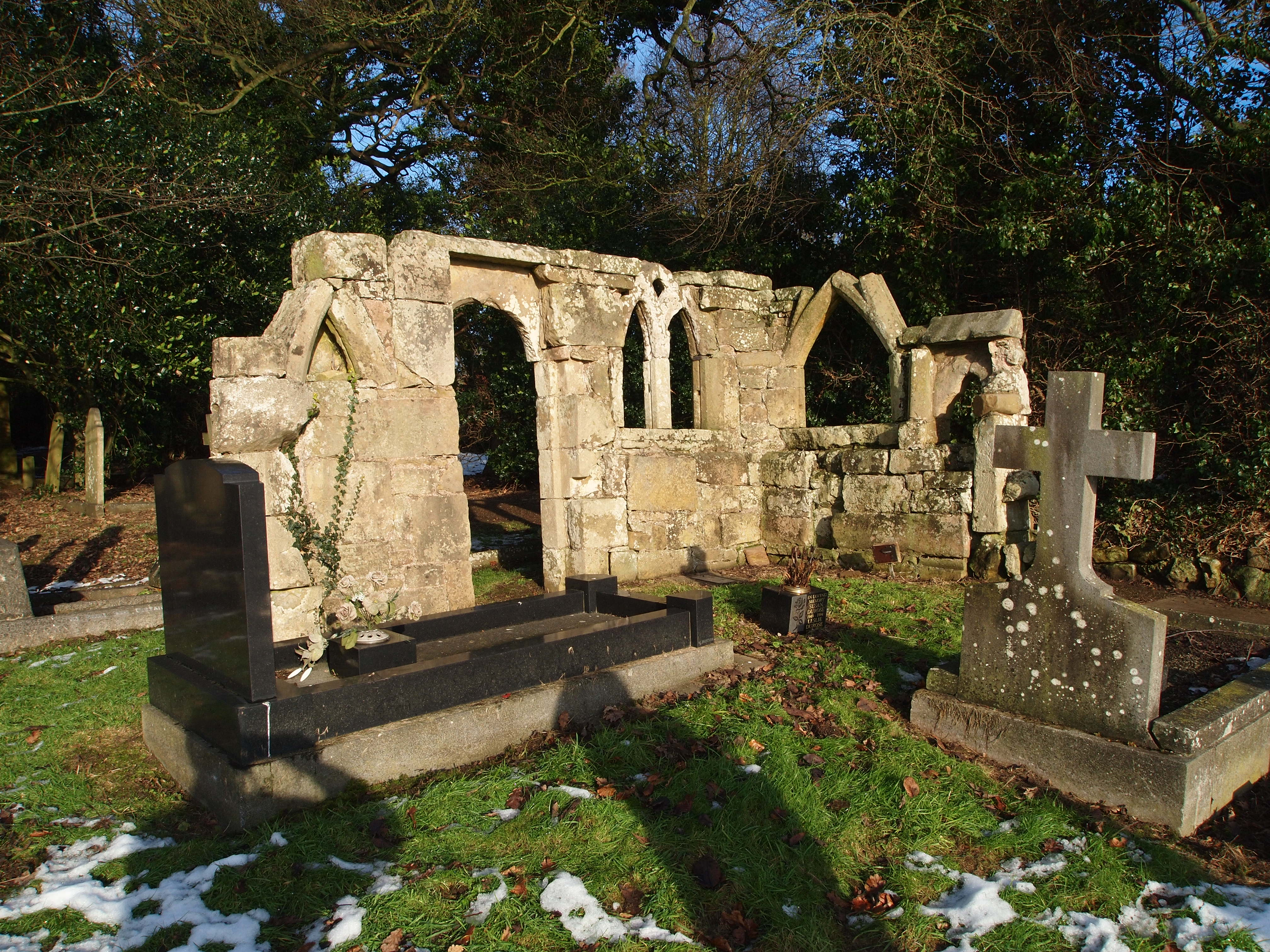
Part of the walls of the earlier church re-erected in the graveyard

== See also ==
- Grade II* listed buildings in Nottinghamshire
- Listed buildings in Blidworth

== Sources ==
- Pevsner, Nikolaus (1979). Nottinghamshire (Pevsner Architectural Guides: Buildings of England). Harmondsworth, Middx. Penguin. ISBN 978-0300096361.
