= Haywood Oaks =

Hamlet in Nottinghamshire, England

Coordinates: 53.087857°N 1.0988955°W

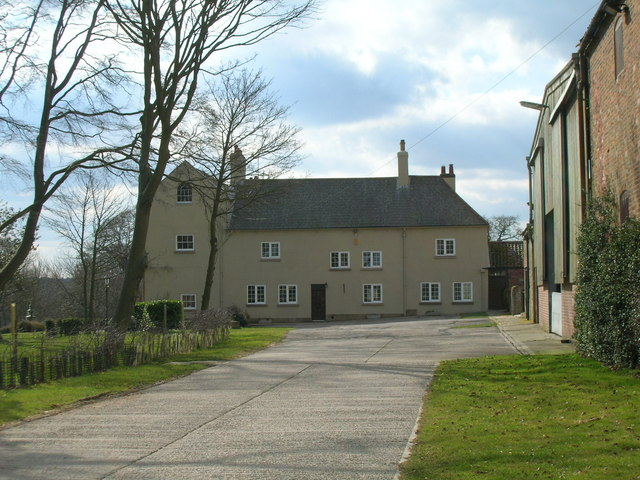

- Location within Nottinghamshire
- Civil parish: Blidworth
- District: Newark and Sherwood
- Shire county: Nottinghamshire
- Region: East Midlands
- Country: England
- Sovereign state: United Kingdom
- Post town: Mansfield
- Postcode district: NG21
- Dialling code: (01623) 79 & 49
- Police: Nottinghamshire
- Fire: Nottinghamshire
- Ambulance: East Midlands
- UK Parliament: Sherwood

Haywood Oaks is a hamlet and former civil parish, 10 miles (16 km) from Nottingham, now in the parish of Blidworth, in the Newark and Sherwood district, in the county of Nottinghamshire, England. In 1931 the parish had a population of 17. Haywood Oaks continues as an extra parochial area in the Church of England.

== History ==
The name "Haywood Oaks" means 'Enclosed wood'. Haywood Oaks was an extra-parochial area until 1858 when it became a separate parish, on 19 February 1988 the parish was abolished and merged with Blidworth. Most of the population of Haywood Oaks is concentrated around the area around Dale Lane and Haywood Oaks Lane.
