= Faoilleach =

Scottish Gaelic term for January

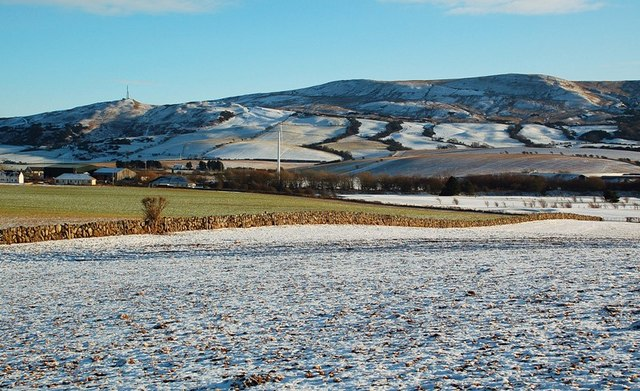
Snow in Girvan during the faoilleach, January 2010

Faoilleach or Faoilteach ([ˈfɯːl(t)ɛx]; in Scots and English rendered as fulteachs, futtick, furtoch, furtock, etc.) is a Scottish Gaelic term which originally referred to a certain period in the agricultural calendar and which refers to the first month of the year, January, in the modern language.

Nowadays, the term has fallen out of English and Lowland Scots, but is still used in Gaelic for the month of January specifically. It would appear to be a very old term, as it seems to come from faol or faol-chù meaning a wolf, a creature which has been extinct in Scotland since the 17th century.

The Gaels of old regarded stormy weather towards the end of January as prognostic of a fruitful season to follow, or vice versa, as shown in various proverbs.

== Variations ==
In Lewis, Faoilleach fell on the Friday nearest to three weeks before the end of January, and ended on the Tuesday nearest the end of the third week of February. It was said to be three weeks of winter, and three weeks of spring.

A shorter Faoilteach consisted of the last fortnight of winter, and the first fortnight of spring, in the Old Style calendar, proverbial for its variable weather. Sometimes the first half was called Am Faoilteach Geamraidh (Winter Faoilteach), and the second half Am Faoilteach Earraich (Spring Faoilteach).

Na Faoiltich is also used to mean the equinoxes according to Dwelly, presumably the vernal equinox.

In Irish, the word means February instead of January.

== Proverbs ==
- "In Faoilteach, the three furrows side by side should be full of water, full of snow, and full of house thatch." (presumably referring to climate and growth)
- "For every mavis that sings in Faoilleach, she’ll lament seven times ere spring be over."
- "It comes on Friday and goes on Tuesday."

John Jamieson records another saying:

"they wish the Fuilteachs in with an adder's head, and to go out with a peacock's tail, i.e. to be stormy in the beginning, and mild towards the end."

This is very similar to the Highland sentiments.
