= Bladbean =

Hamlet in Kent, England

Coordinates: 51.18°N 1.12°E

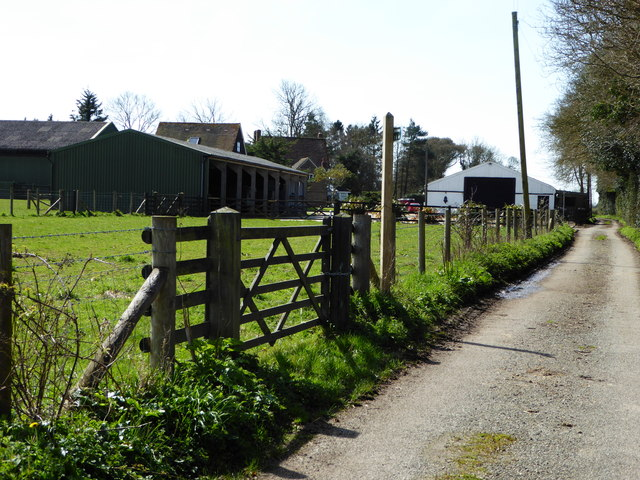
- Bladbean Farm

- Location within Kent
- District: Folkestone and Hythe
- Shire county: Kent
- Region: South East
- Country: England
- Sovereign state: United Kingdom
- Post town: Canterbury
- Postcode district: CT4 6
- Police: Kent
- Fire: Kent
- Ambulance: South East Coast
- UK Parliament: Folkestone and Hythe

Bladbean is a scattered hamlet between Canterbury and Folkestone in Kent, England. It lies along a minor road east of Stelling Minnis. It is in the civil parish of Elham.
