= Blaen-pant =

Village in Ceredigion, Wales

Coordinates: 52.070442°N 4.547473°W

- Location within Ceredigion
- OS grid reference: SN 2549 4440
  - Cardiff: 71.5 mi (115.1 km)
  - London: 192.8 mi (310.3 km)
- Community: Beulah
- Principal area: Ceredigion
- Country: Wales
- Sovereign state: United Kingdom
- Post town: Cardigan
- Postcode district: SA43
- Police: Dyfed-Powys
- Fire: Mid and West Wales
- Ambulance: Welsh
- UK Parliament: Ceredigion Preseli
- Senedd Cymru – Welsh Parliament: Ceredigion

Blaen-pant is a small village in the community of Beulah, Ceredigion, Wales, which is 71.5 miles (115 km) from Cardiff and 192.8 miles (310.3 km) from London. Blaen-pant is represented in the Senedd by Elin Jones (Plaid Cymru) and is part of the Ceredigion Preseli constituency in the House of Commons.

== See also ==
- List of localities in Wales by population
