= Blidworth Bottoms =

Hamlet in Nottinghamshire, England

Coordinates: 53.086°N 1.120°W

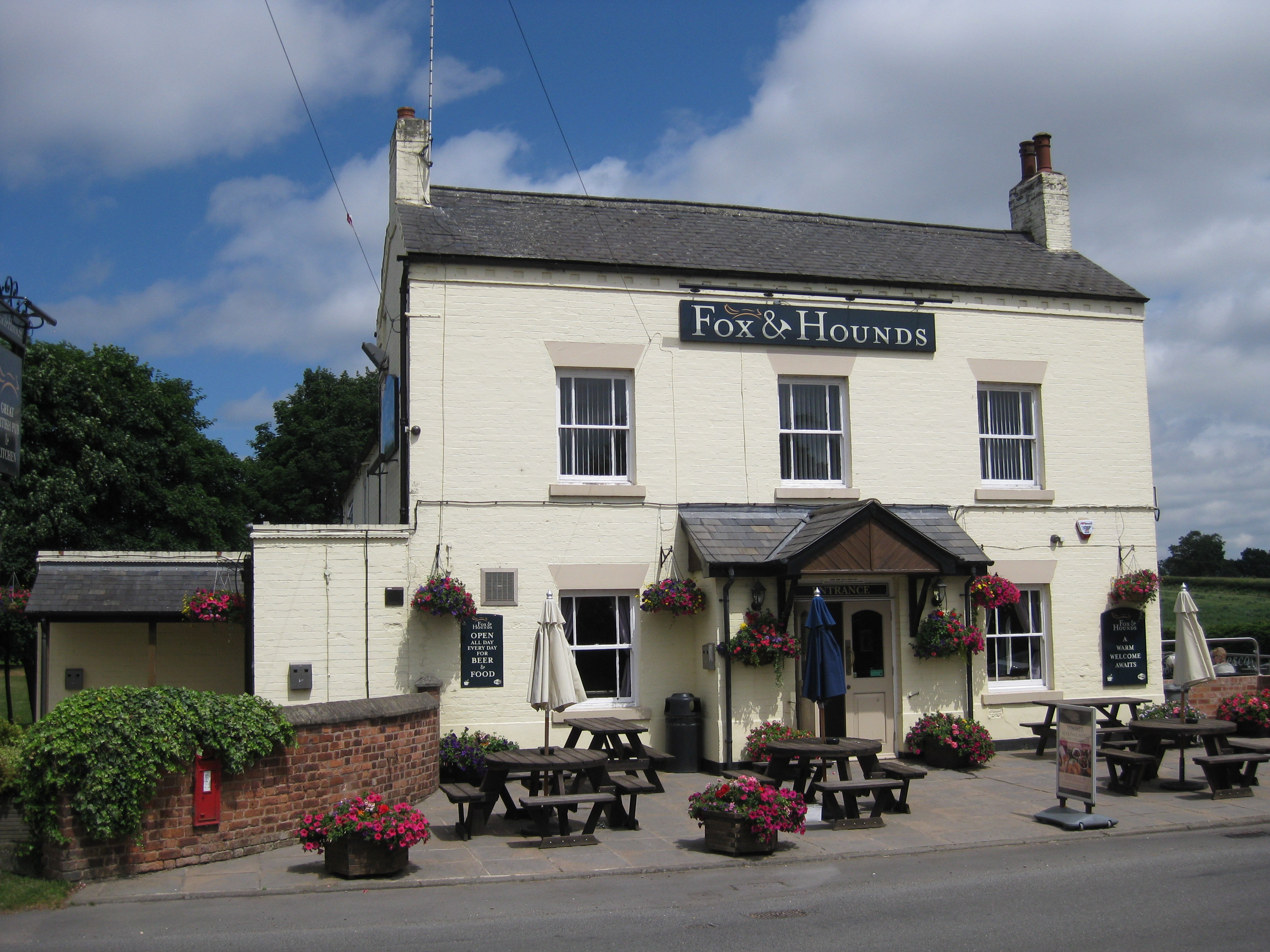
- Fox and Hounds, Calverton Road, Blidworth Bottoms

- Location within Nottinghamshire
- Civil parish: Blidworth
- District: Newark and Sherwood (partly) Borough of Gedling
- Shire county: Nottinghamshire
- Region: East Midlands
- Country: England
- Sovereign state: United Kingdom
- Post town: Mansfield
- Postcode district: NG21
- Police: Nottinghamshire
- Fire: Nottinghamshire
- Ambulance: East Midlands
- UK Parliament: Sherwood

Blidworth Bottoms is a hamlet in Nottinghamshire, England, near to Blidworth and Ravenshead. Population details are included in the civil parish of Blidworth. The hamlet includes Bottoms Farm, the Fox and Hounds public house, a riding school and a small number of houses.

In the 19th century a barn was converted into a Primitive Methodist chapel. Well attended when recorded in the 1851 Religious Census, it had fallen into decline by the 1900s.

The location has also been known as Lower Blidworth.
