= Bliss Gate =

Village in Worcestershire, England

Coordinates: 52.3506°N 2.37230°W

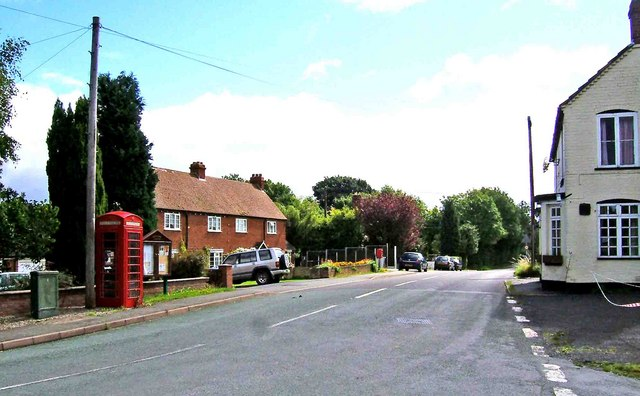
- Heightington Road

- Location within Worcestershire
- OS grid reference: SO745725
  - London: 113 miles (182 km)
- District: Wyre Forest
- Shire county: Worcestershire
- Region: West Midlands
- Country: England
- Sovereign state: United Kingdom
- Post town: KIDDERMINSTER
- Postcode district: DY14
- Dialling code: 01299
- Police: West Mercia
- Fire: Hereford and Worcester
- Ambulance: West Midlands

Bliss Gate is a village in Worcestershire, England. It had many attractive tourist landmarks such as the Bliss Gate Inn (now closed) and a village board for Rock village. It lies within the civil parish of Rock, which had a population of 2,677 in 2021.
