= Blidworth =

Village and civil parish in Nottinghamshire, England

Coordinates: 53.0980°N 1.1165°W

- Village and civil parish
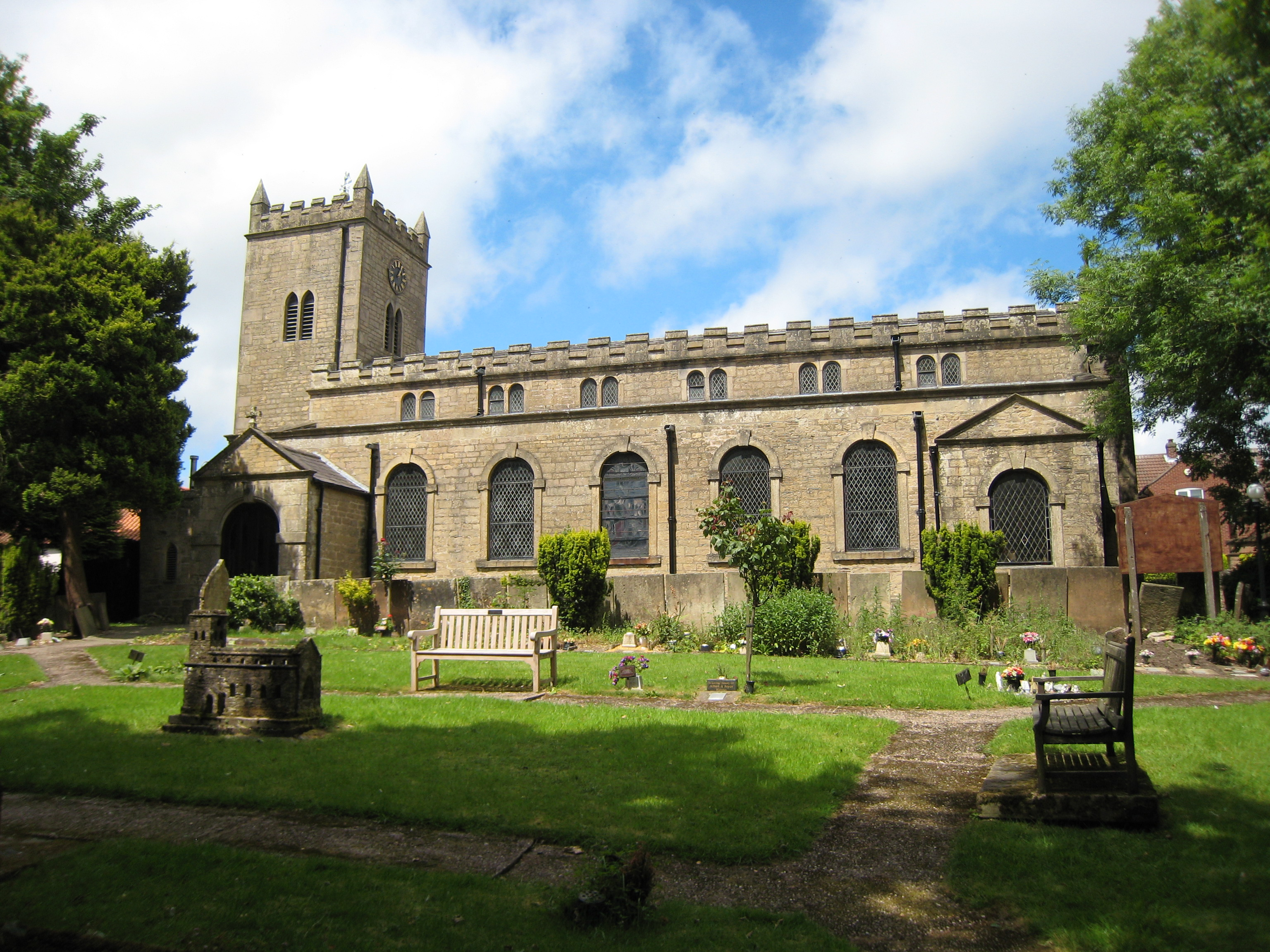
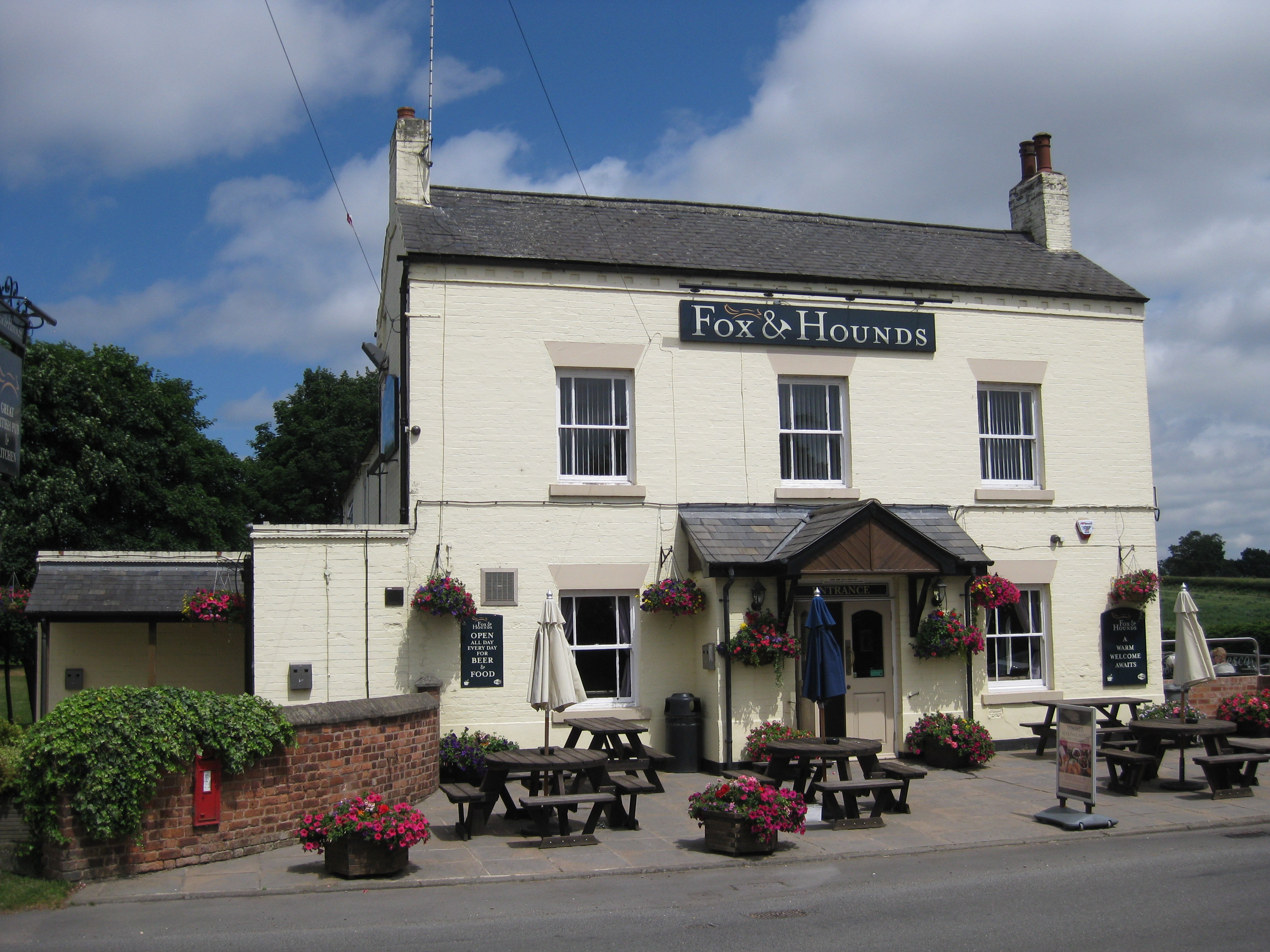
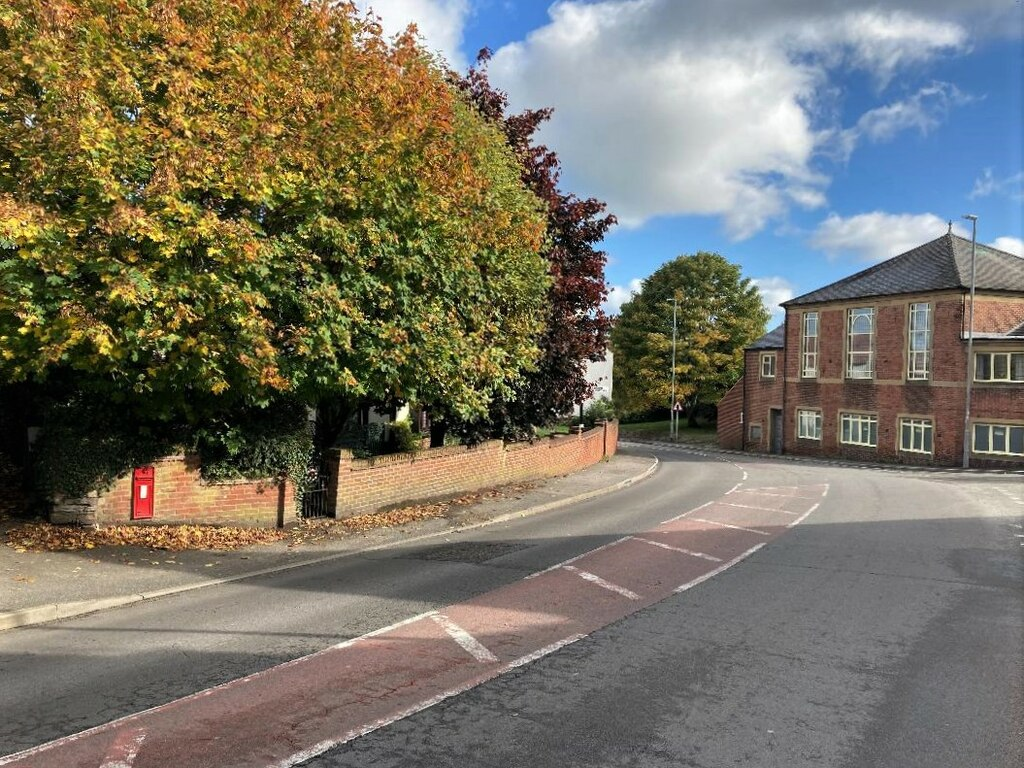
- St Mary's Church Fox and Hounds Main Street

- Location within Nottinghamshire
- Interactive map of Blidworth
- Area: 4.81 sq mi (12.5 km^{2})
- Population: 4,295 (2021)
  - Density: 893/sq mi (345/km^{2})
- OS grid reference: SK 592560
  - London: 115 mi (185 km) SSE
- District: Newark and Sherwood
- Shire county: Nottinghamshire
- Region: East Midlands
- Country: England
- Sovereign state: United Kingdom
- Settlements: Blidworth; Blidworth Bottoms; Haywood Oaks
- Post town: Mansfield
- Postcode district: NG21
- Dialling code: 01623
- Police: Nottinghamshire
- Fire: Nottinghamshire
- Ambulance: East Midlands
- UK Parliament: Sherwood
- Website: blidworthparishcouncil.org.uk

Blidworth is a village and civil parish approximately five miles east of Mansfield, Nottinghamshire, England. The population of the civil parish at the 2011 census was 4,457, this dropped to 4,295 in the 2021 census.

== Toponymy ==
Blidworth seems to contain the Old English personal name, Blitha' + worð (Old English) an enclosure, so 'Blitha's enclosure'.

== History ==
The first recorded reference of Blidworth was in the Domesday Book, a national survey which was executed for William I of England in 1086. It is recorded as Blideworde, its recorded population was five households and the total tax assessed was 1.1 Geld Units. Although this is the first recorded reference of Blidworth, the village is much older and was possibly used by the Romans.

=== Druid Stone ===
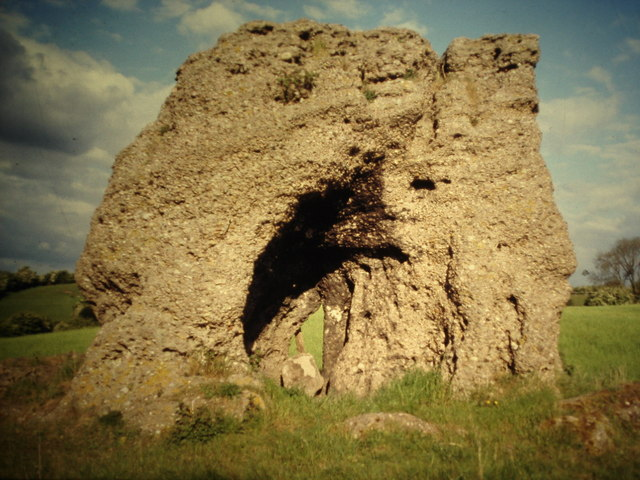
Druid Stone

On the outskirts of the village of Blidworth, on farmlands, lies a stone known locally as the Druid Stone (Grid Reference: SK5787-558), a pillar of cemented glacial gravel standing on a base of the Nottingham Castle rock formation (Bunter Pebble Beds). This monumental object is 14 ft high, 84 ft around the base and has a hollow centre large enough for a man to pass through. Though known as the Druid Stone, there is no evidence to suggest that it has ever been used by druids. It is a naturally forming outcrop.

Its history can be traced back to the 10th century. The area around Main Street, west of Beck Lane and including the church, is the older portion of Blidworth, containing historic buildings.

=== 12th to 13th Centuries ===
==== Robin Hood ====
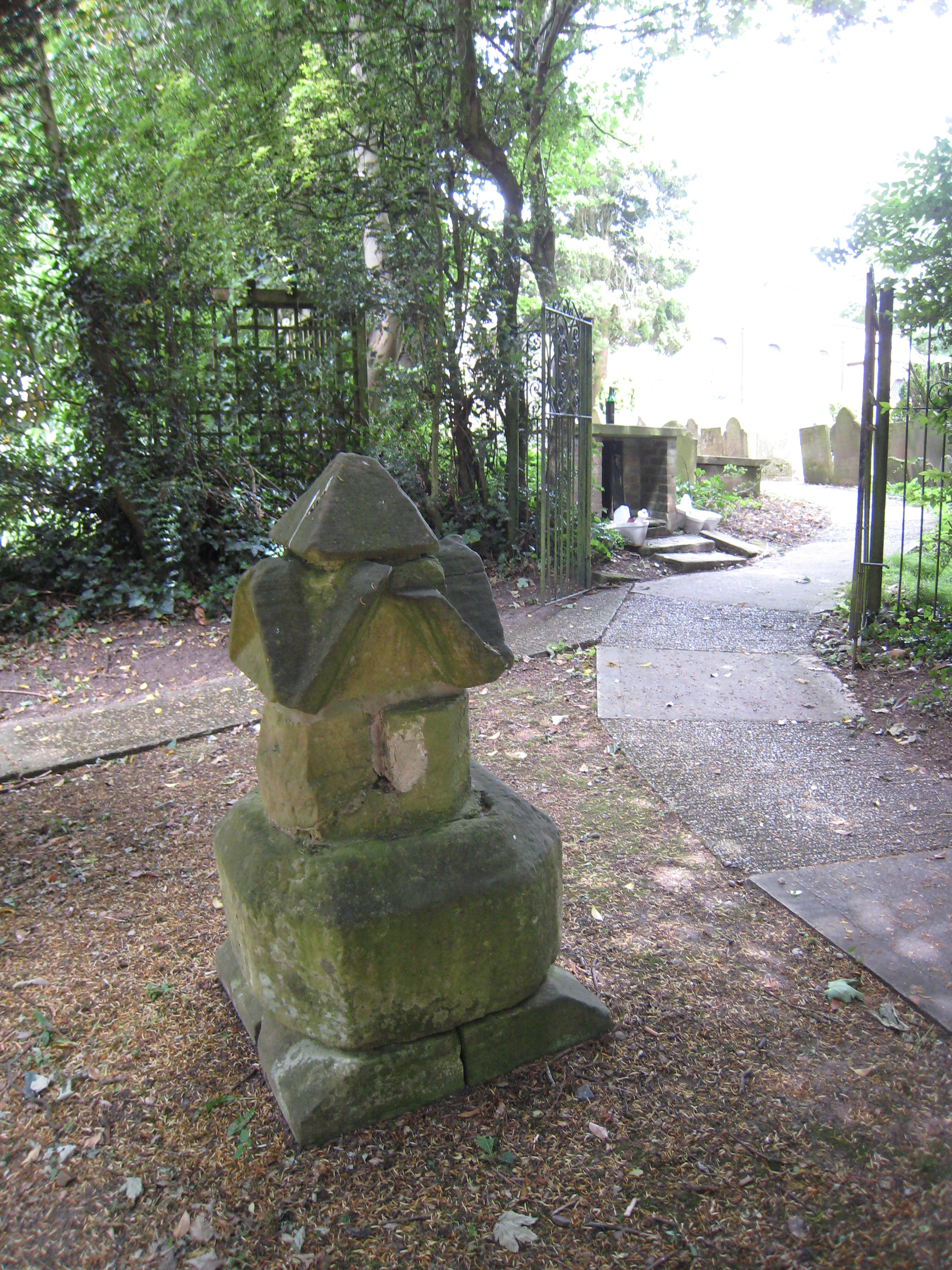
Will Scarlet grave marker

According to legend, Will Scarlet is buried in the churchyard of the Church of St. Mary of the Purification. An unmarked grave stands near the iron gates of the churchyard, formed from the original apex of the church tower and other assorted stones, and is generally attributed to the outlaw. As outlaws were not generally buried in churchyards, though, it is more likely that, if he existed, Will Scarlet was buried in one of the much older graves to be found on the same hillside within the boundaries of Sherwood Forest.

Other local legends suggest that Blidworth was the birthplace of Maid Marian, although there is little or no evidence to support these claims.

=== 19th and 20th Centuries ===
==== Blidworth Mill ====
This Subscription Mill was built c. 1816 as a three-storey brick tower windmill. With 3 pairs of millstones, it was working in 1892 but was dismantled some time during the First World War. It had 4 double patent sails, an ogee cap and an 8-bladed fantail. Millers listed as working the mill include Foster (1842), Edmund Clark (1864 and Thomas Penford (1904). The tower still stands to a height of 26 feet north of the older part of Blidworth (grid reference SK585557).

One of the post windmills from Nottingham was moved to Blidworth in the 1850s, and was later moved to Hemsworth. A post windmill at Windmill Close, between Mount Pleasant and Belle Vue Lane was recorded in 1842; the owner was John Need and the tenant miller Thomas Blatherwick. A post windmill in Mill Croft, behind the Wesleyan chapel, was worked by miller William Holloway in 1864. It was demolished c. 1878. Up to the end of the 19th century it was a farming community with 150 houses clustered around Main Street and 26 farms and three mills, with a population of about 2000. A major change came with the construction of a colliery north of Belle Vue Road in 1921 with the resulting construction of housing for workers. Thus the major part of the population is in an area in the east of Blidworth, between Belle Vue Lane in the north and Dale Lane in the south. Mansfield Road forms the west of this and is the main shopping area. The mine closed in 1989. There is now an industrial estate on Burma Road, north of Belle Vue Lane, as well as a Leisure Centre and the Miners Social Welfare Centre.

==== Blidworth Welfare Band ====
Blidworth Welfare Band is a brass band with mining heritage, starting in the late 19th century as the Stanton Hill Temperance Band based in Sutton in Ashfield; the band later changed their name to the Stanton Hill Silver Band until the coal industry showed an interest in brass banding in general. An alliance with Teversal, Silver Hill and Sutton Collieries saw a name change for the band, and it became the Teversal Collieries Band until the demise of those mines in the late 1970s, which forced the band to relocate to Blidworth in 1980 and a change of name to the Blidworth Welfare Band.

The band has established itself over the years as a contesting band and competes in the Championship Section.

==== Housing ====
Many of the current houses were built in the first half of the 20th century to provide housing for workers at Blidworth Colliery (1926–1989). These are mainly in estates north of Dale Lane. Outside of Blidworth village but within the parish, Blidworth Bottoms is a hamlet about 0.5 km south of Blidworth. Haywood Oaks is the portion of the village south of Dale Lane and the south eastern rural area of the parish surrounding Haywood Oaks Lane.

Other 20th century industries included factories for the manufacture of shoes, hosiery, textiles and metal products. Much of these industrial areas have been redeveloped and new housing has been constructed around the periphery of the village, with new street names, such as Will Scarlet Close.

==== Blidworth Welfare Football Club ====
Blidworth Welfare were formed in 1926. They have played in the Central Midlands Football League and the Northern Counties East Football League. In 1982, they changed their name from Folk House Old Boys F.C. to their present name.

== Places of worship ==
There are four places of worship, the C of E parish Church of St Mary of the Purification, Blidworth Methodist Church, Sherwood Forest Community Church and the St Andrew's Mission Hall.

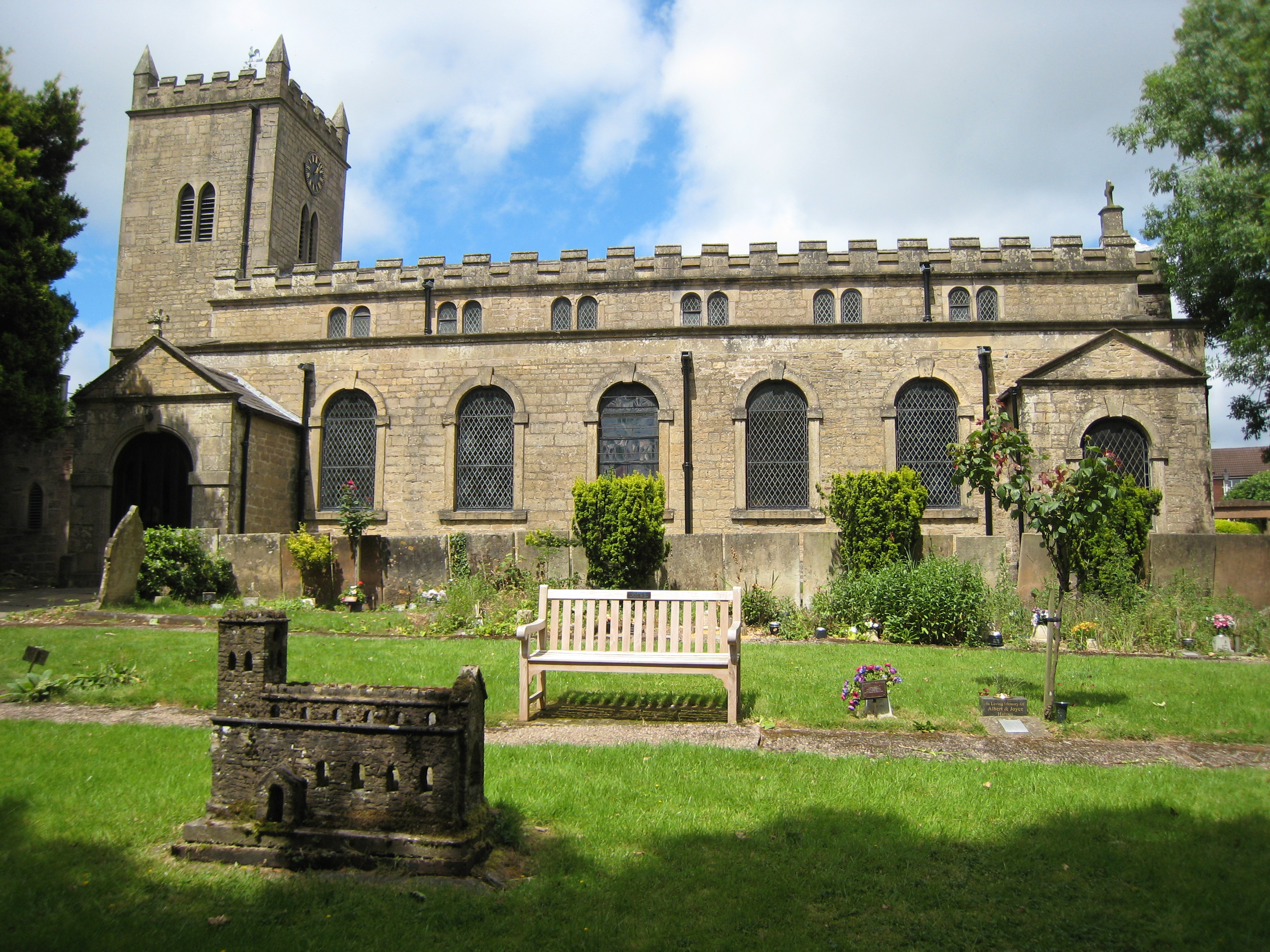
Church of St Mary

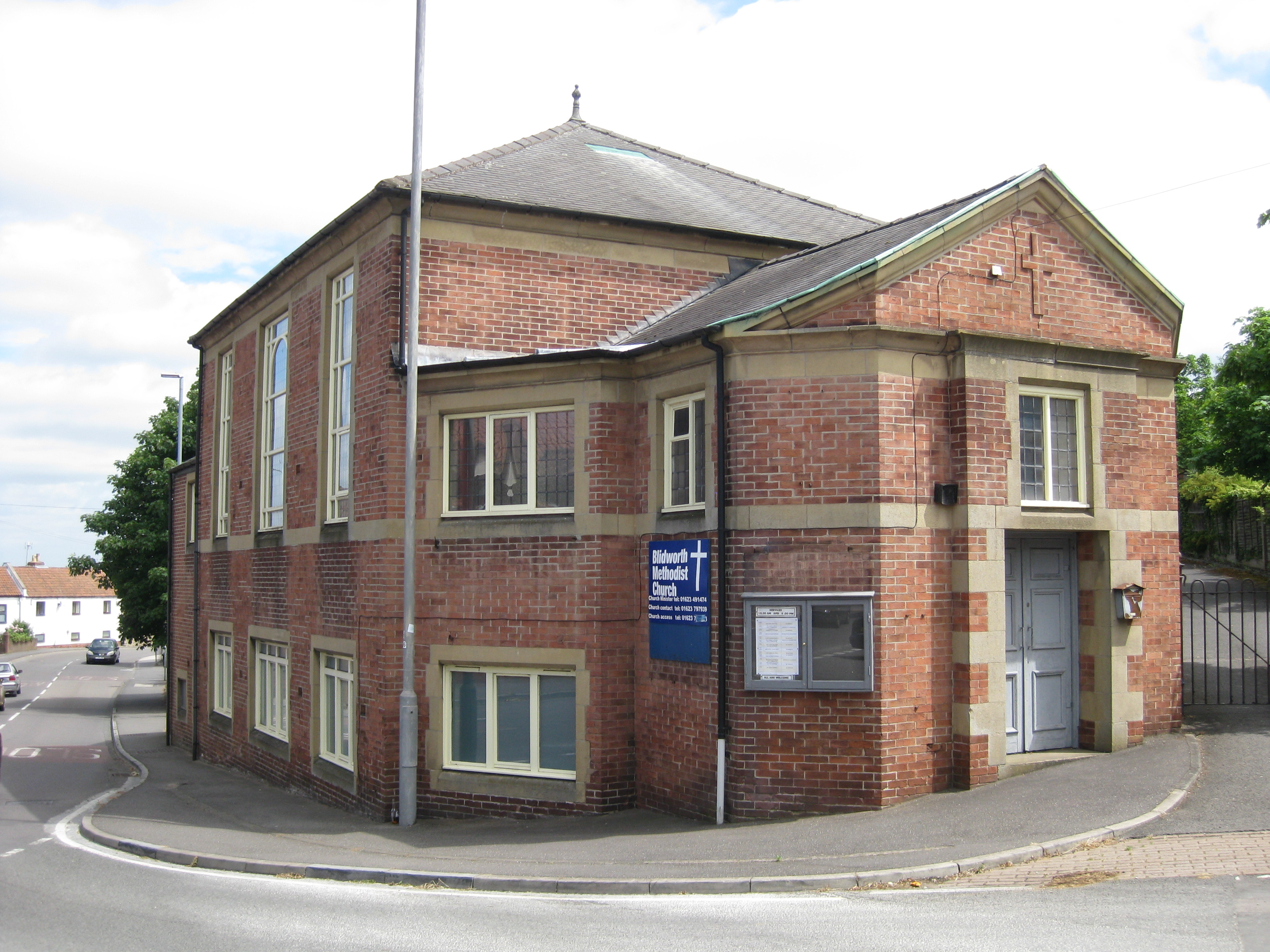
Blidworth Methodist Church

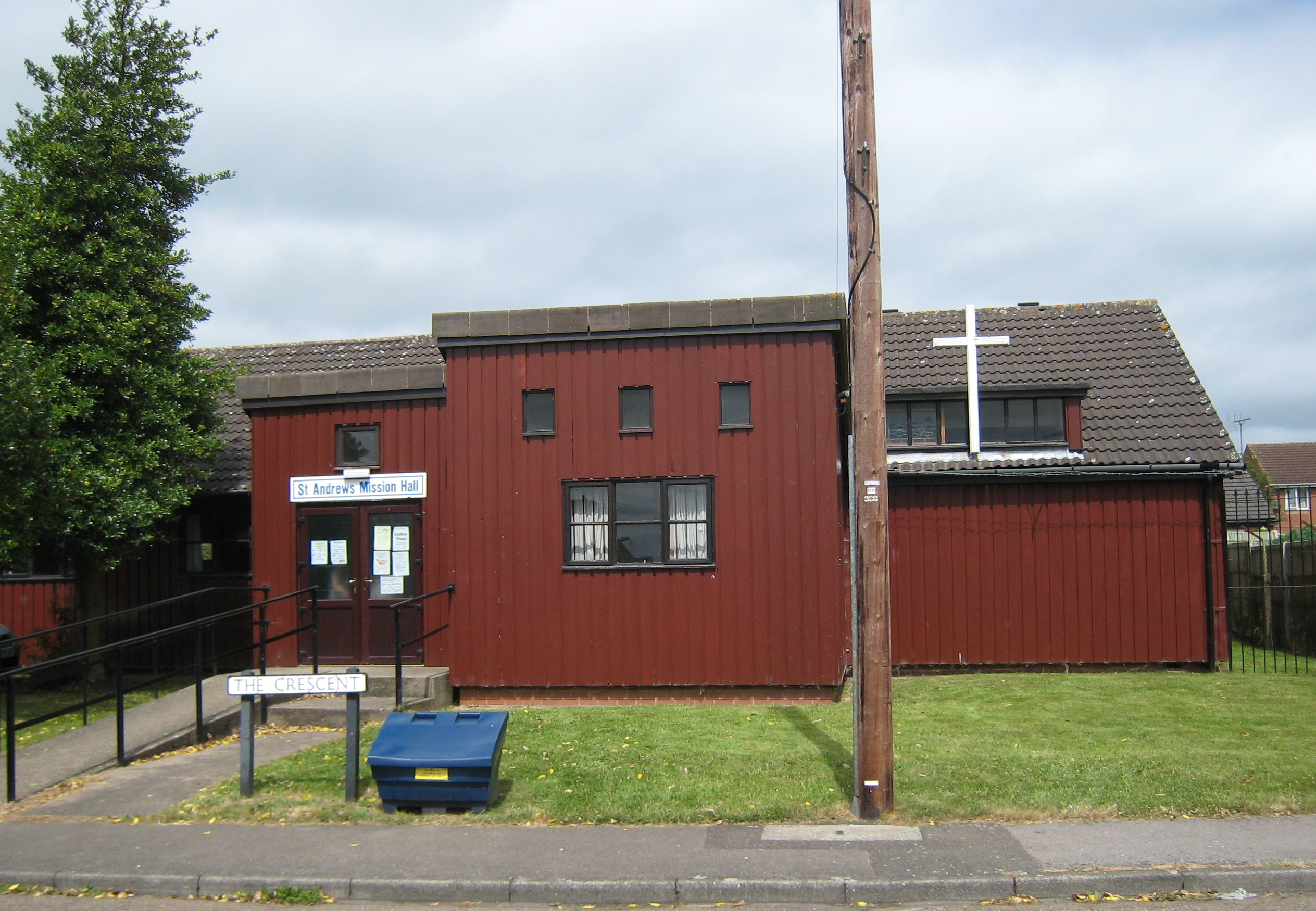
St Andrew's Mission Hall

== Gallery ==
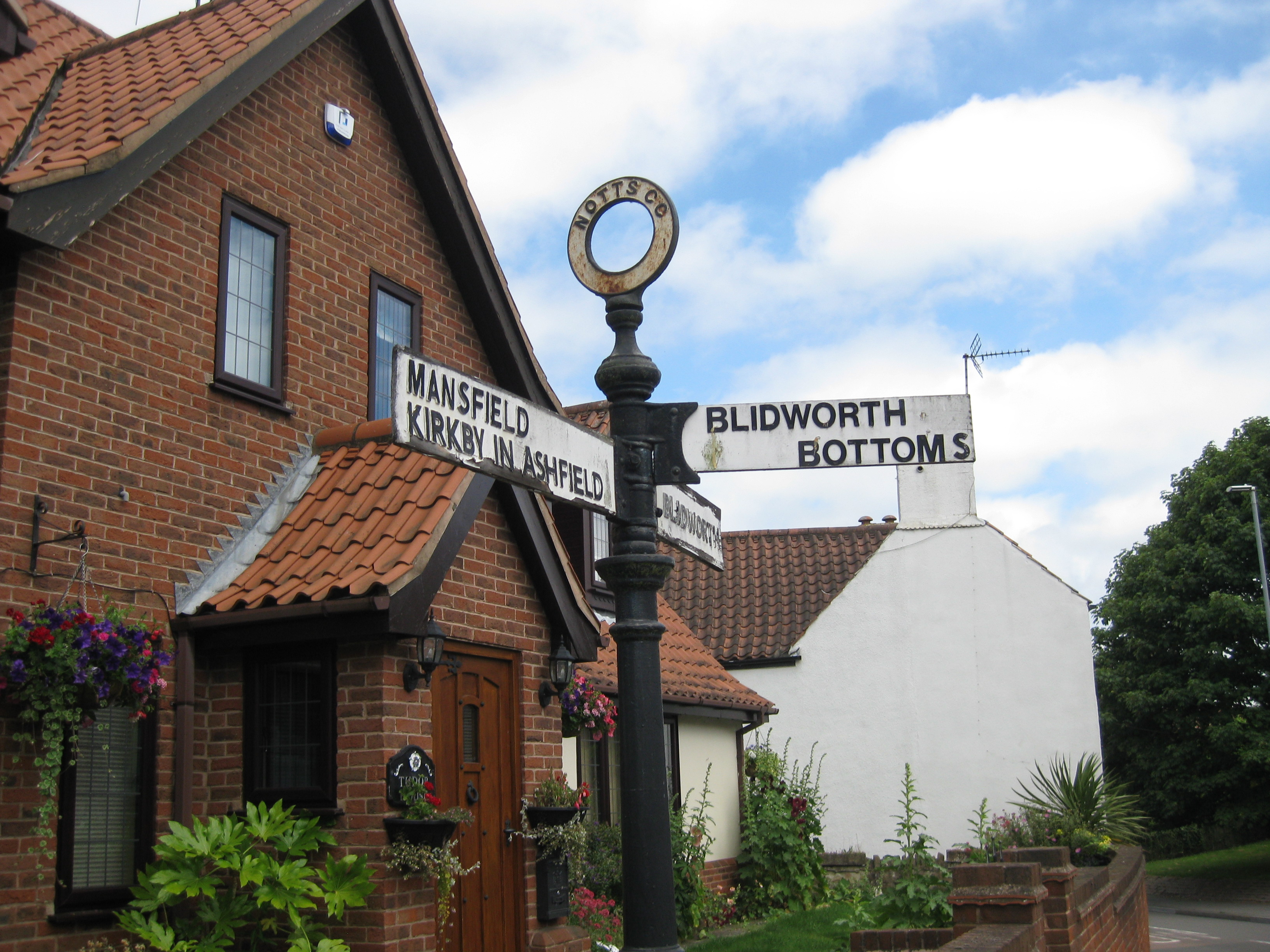
Signpost to Blidworth Bottoms

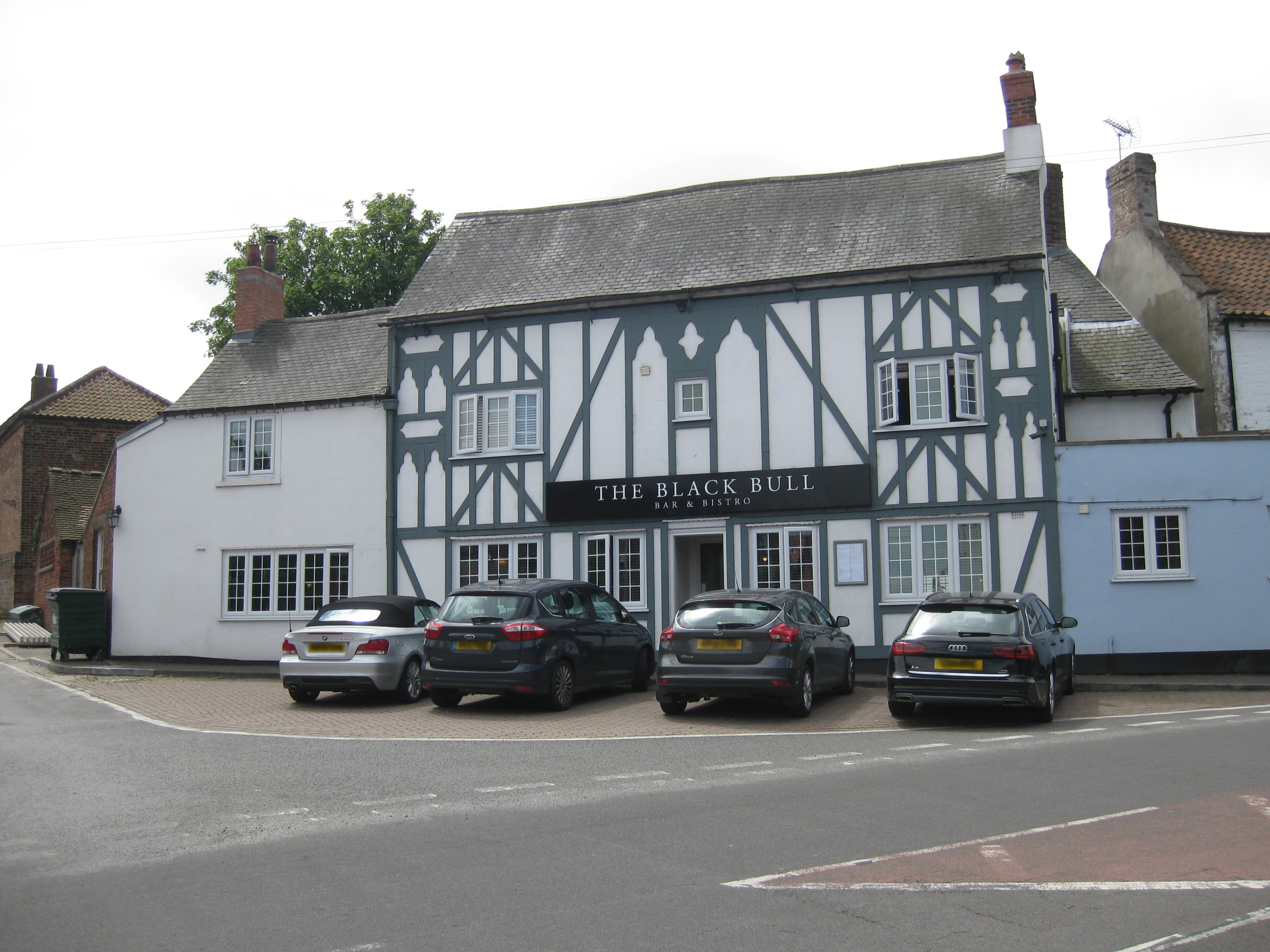
The Black Bull

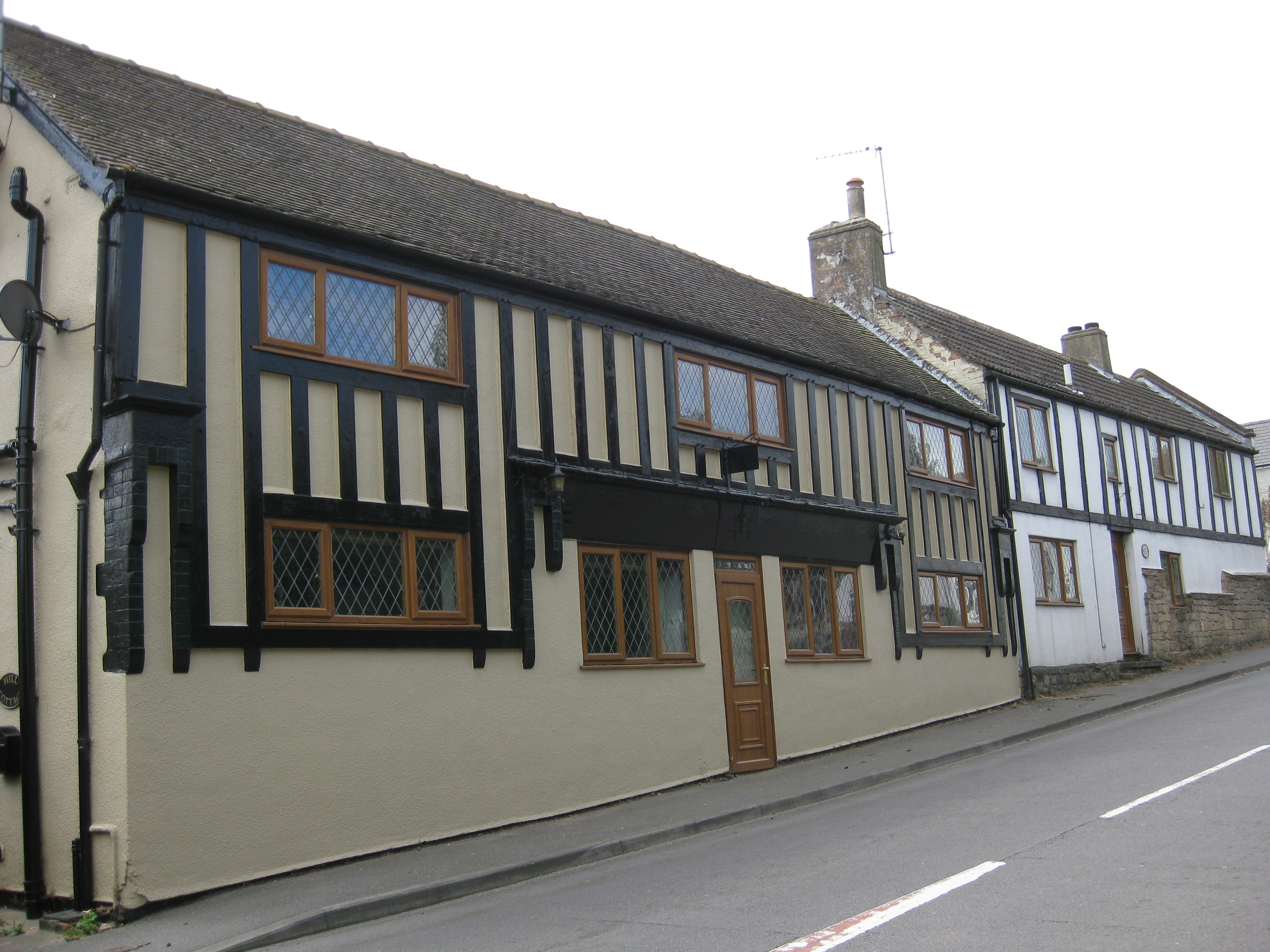
Houses in Blidworth

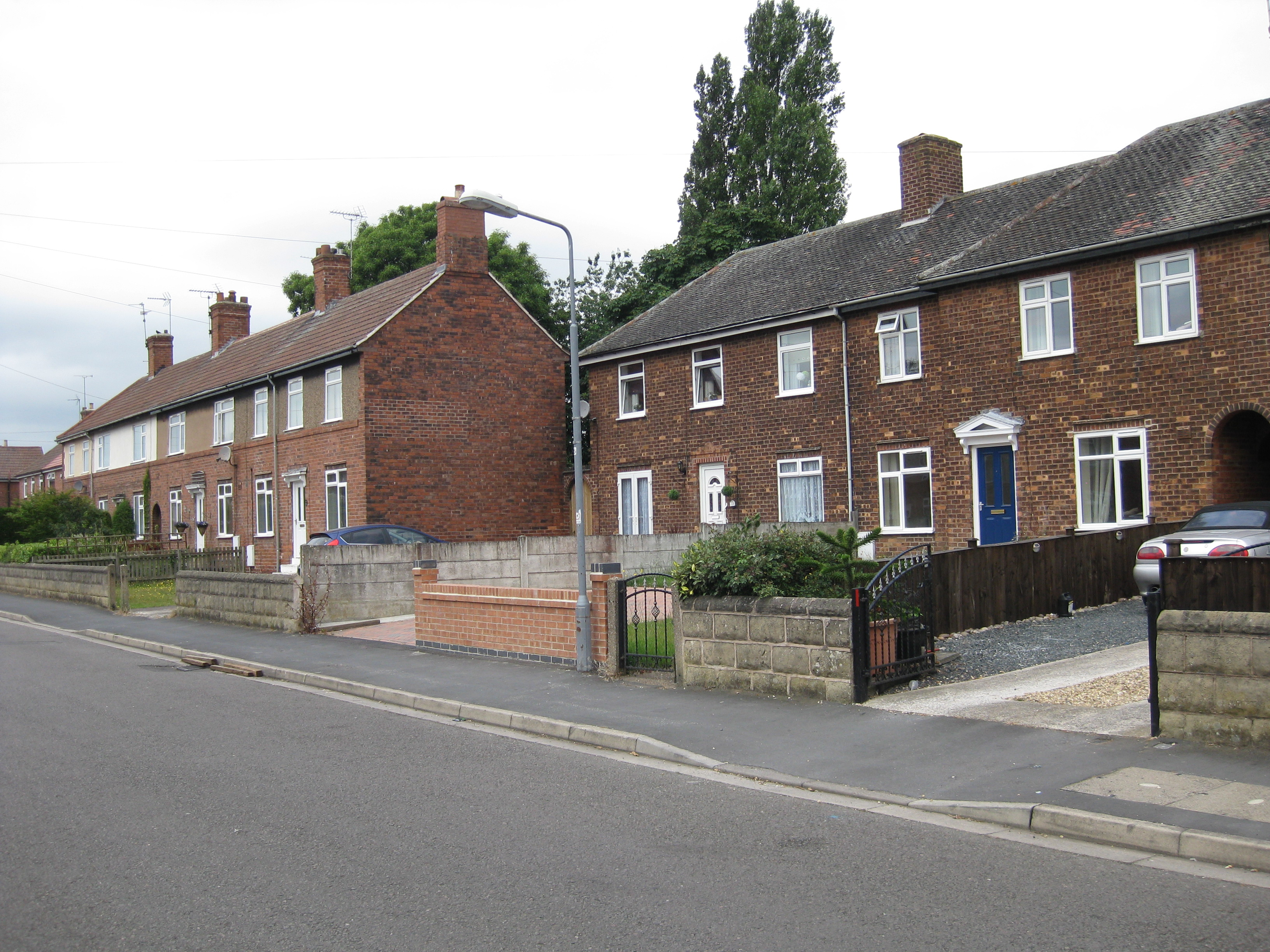
Appleton Road: 20th century estate houses in New Blidworth

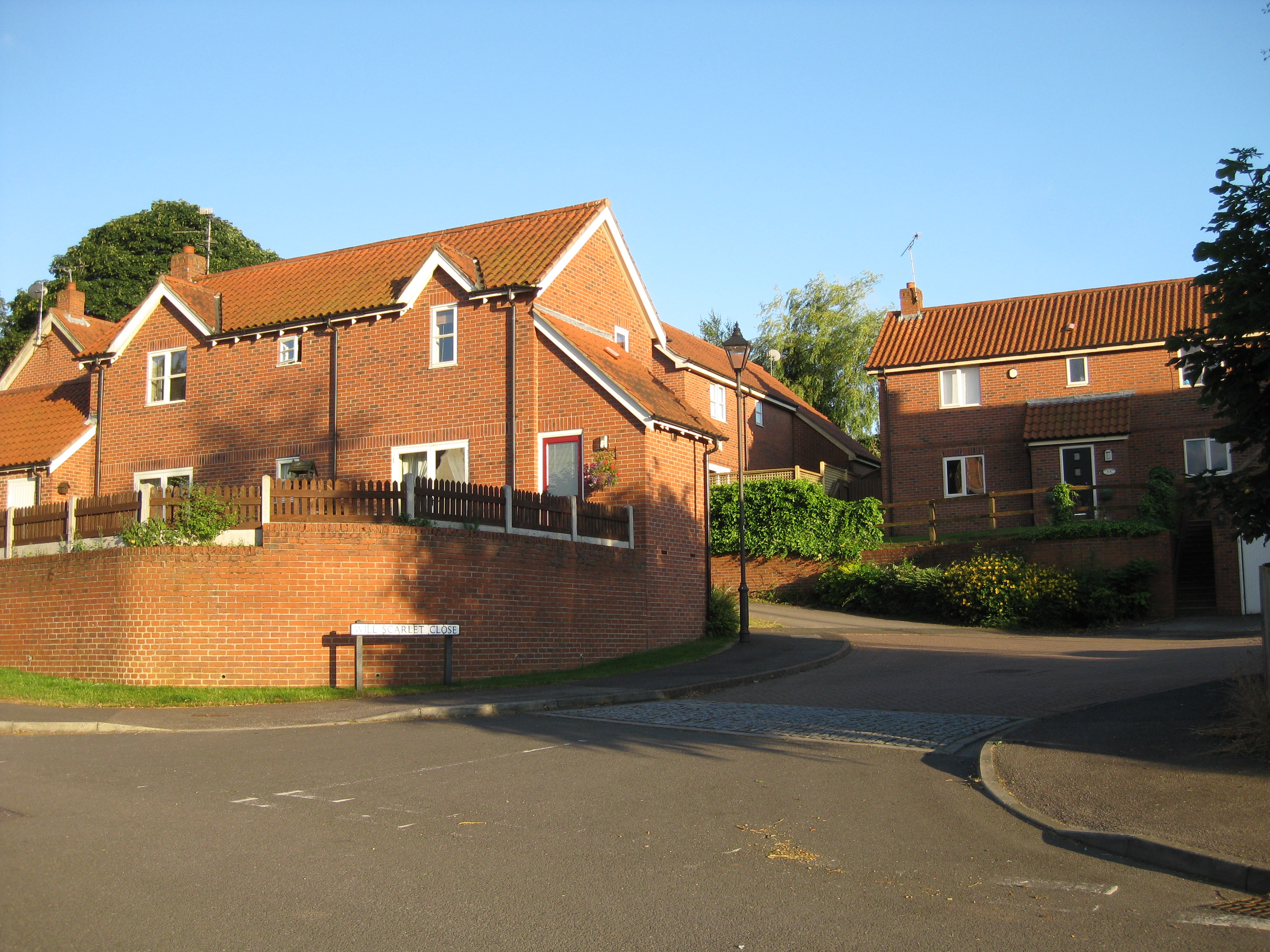
Newer houses in Will Scarlet Close

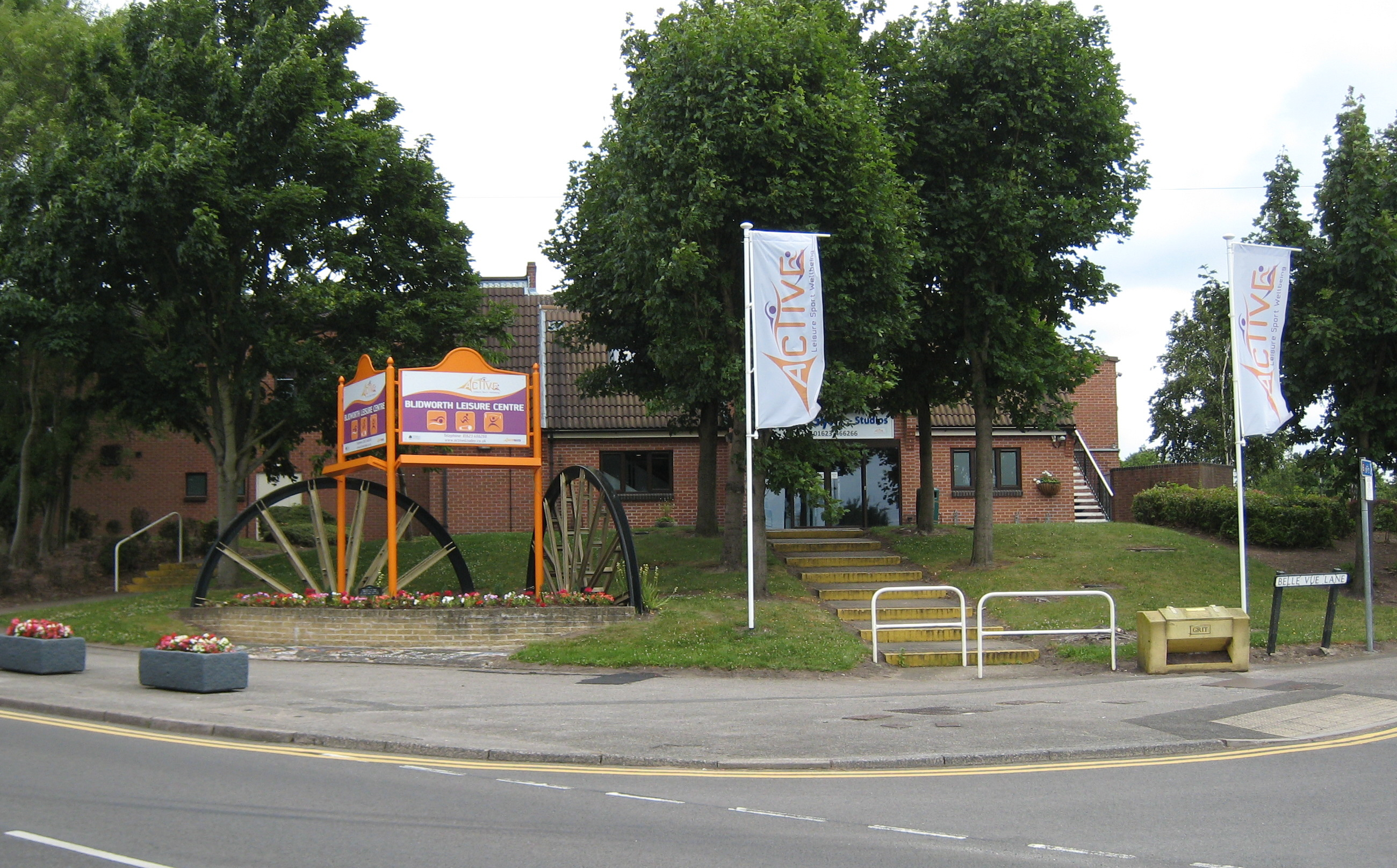
Leisure Centre with former coal mine winding wheels

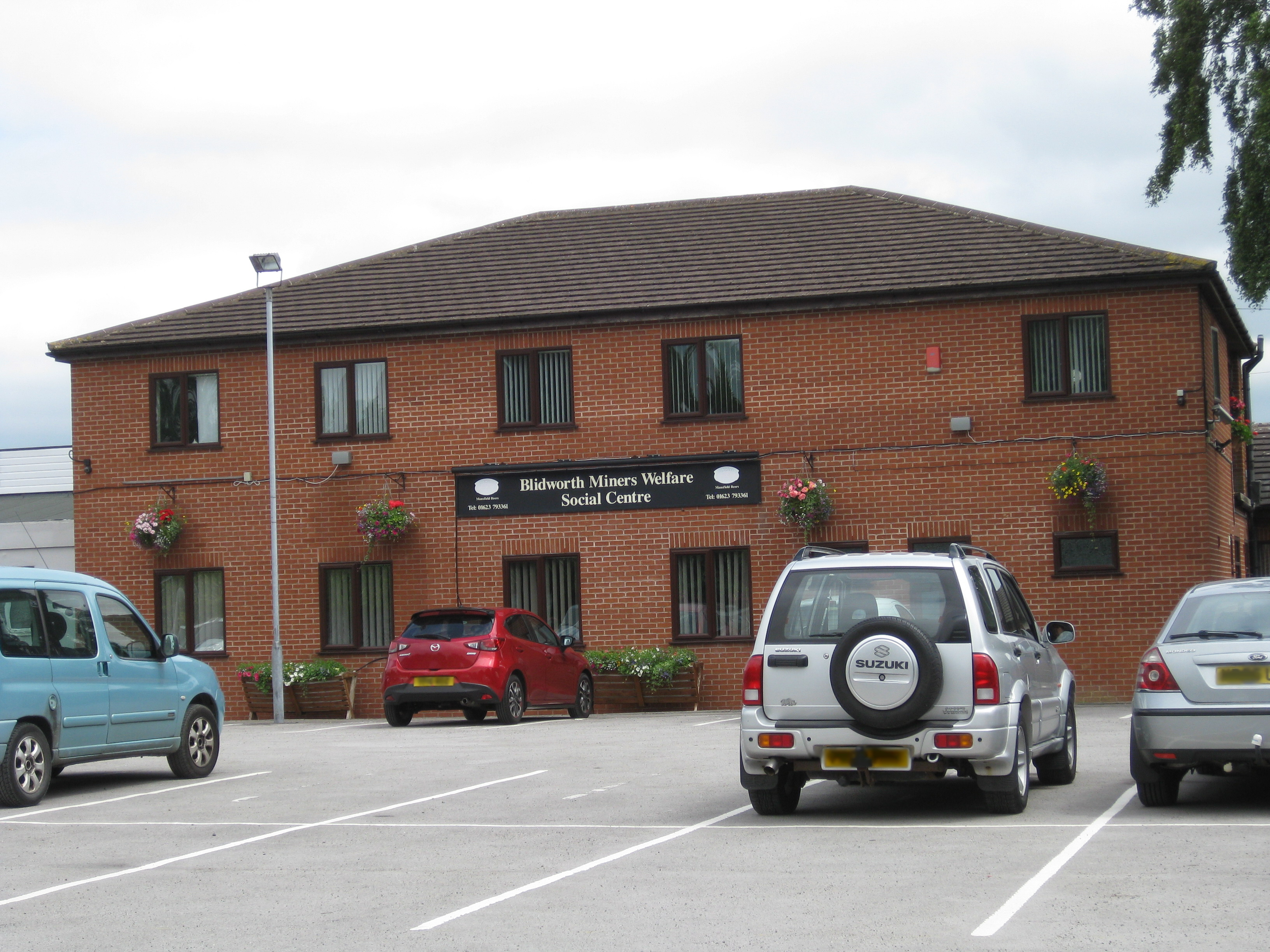
Miners Social Welfare Centre

== See also ==
- Listed buildings in Blidworth
