= Thurgarton Wapentake =

Former administrative division of Nottinghamshire, England

Coordinates: 53.05°N 0.95°W

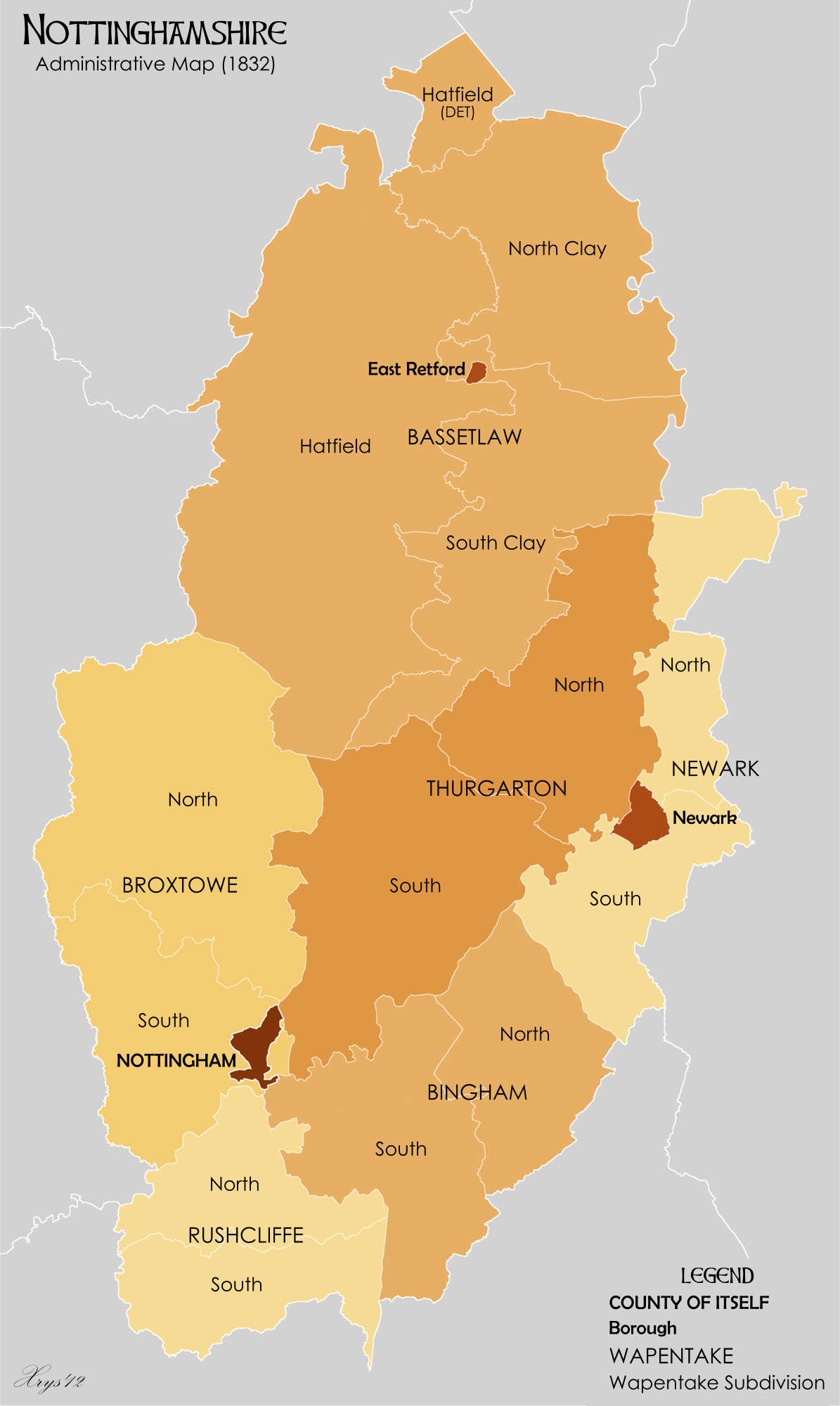
Map showing the Thurgarton wapentake

Thurgarton was a wapentake (equivalent to a hundred) of the historic county of Nottinghamshire, England. It extended north-eastwards from Nottingham. The River Trent formed most of the eastern boundary. It consisted of the parishes of Averham, Bathley, Bleasby, Blidworth, Bulcote, Burton Joyce, Calverton, Carlton, Carlton-on-Trent, Caunton, Caythorpe, Colwick, Cromwell, East Stoke, Edingley, Epperstone, Farnsfield, Fiskerton, Fiskerton cum Morton, Fledborough, Gedling, Gonalston, Grassthorpe, Gunthorpe, Halam, Halloughton, Haywood Oaks, Hockerton, Holme, Hoveringham, Kelham, Kersall, Kirklington, Kneesall, Lambley, Lindhurst, Lowdham, Maplebeck, Marnham, Meering, Morton, Normanton on Trent, North Muskham, Norwell, Norwell Woodhouse, Nottingham St Mary, Ossington, Oxton, Park Leys, Rolleston, Sneinton, South Muskham, Southwell, Staythorpe, Stoke Bardolph, Sutton on Trent, Thurgarton, Upton, Weston, Winkburn and Woodborough.

Contained within the boundaries of the wapentake are parts of the current Newark and Sherwood district, Gedling borough and the City of Nottingham.
