= Listed buildings in Fiskerton cum Morton =

Fiskerton cum Morton is a civil parish in the Newark and Sherwood district of Nottinghamshire, England. The parish contains eight listed buildings that are recorded in the National Heritage List for England. Of these, one is at Grade II*, the middle of the three grades, and the others are at Grade II, the lowest grade. The parish contains the villages of Fiskerton and Morton, and the surrounding area. The listed buildings consist of houses, a cottage, a church, a pigeoncote, a farmhouse and a public house.

== Key ==
| Grade | Criteria |
|---|---|
| II* | Particularly important buildings of more than special interest |
| II | Buildings of national importance and special interest |

== Buildings ==
| Name and location | Photograph | Date | Notes | Grade |
|---|---|---|---|---|
| Pigeoncote, Manor Farm; 53.05577°N 0.91821°W | | Late 17th century | The pigeoncote is in red brick on a stone plinth, with rusticated raised quoins and a pyramidal tile roof, surmounted by a wooden glover with a pyramidal roof and a finial. There are two storeys and a loft, and a single bay. On the left is a single-storey outbuilding with a pantile roof. | II |
| Rose Cottage; 53.05233°N 0.90225°W | | Early 18th century | The cottage is in red brick, the ground floor rendered, with a floor band, dentilled eaves, and a pantile roof, the left gable coped. There are two storeys and two bays. On the front is a gabled porch, and the windows are horizontally-sliding sashes. | II |
| Kelham Farmhouse; 53.05087°N 0.90709°W | | Mid 18th century | The farmhouse is in red brick, partly on a plinth, with dentilled eaves, and a pantile roof with brick coped gables and kneelers. There are two storeys and four bays, and a projecting flat-roofed wing on the right with a lean-to. The doorway has a fanlight, and the windows are a mix, with a fixed light, and sashes and casements. | II |
| St Denis' Church, Morton; 53.05455°N 0.91679°W | | 1756 | The church is in brick with stone dressings and a slate roof. It consists of a nave and a chancel with an apse under one roof, a north lean-to vestry, and a west tower. The tower has four stages, bands, angled corners with recessed panels, and an embattled parapet. On the west side is an arched doorway, and the south front has a similar blocked doorway. In the stage above, on three fronts, are a recessed rectangular panel and an oeil-de-boeuf, and the bell openings have arched heads. Along each side of the church are three round-arched windows. | II* |
| Eagle House and Anchor Down; 53.05198°N 0.90179°W | | Late 18th century | A public house later divided into two cottages, they are in painted red brick with dogtooth eaves and pantile roofs, the left bay hipped. There are two storeys and attics, and four bays, the left bay later and taller, and containing a full-height polygonal bay window. On the front is a gabled porch and a doorway with a fanlight, to the right is a single-storey polygonal bay window, and the other windows are sashes. At the rear is a two-storey wing and an outshut. | II |
| The Bromley Arms Public House; 53.05185°N 0.90198°W | | Late 18th century | The public house is in painted brick, on a plinth, with dentilled eaves and a slate roof. There are two storeys and attics, four bays, to the right is a two-storey single-bay wing, and at the rear are wings with one and two storeys. The doorway has an architrave with a keystone, it is flanked by round-headed windows, all forming a round arch, over which is a gabled tiled hood. The windows are sashes, those in the lower two floors with segmental heads and flush wedge brick lintels. | II |
| Trent House; 53.05284°N 0.90039°W | | Late 18th to early 19th century | The house is in red brick with a hipped slate roof. There are two storeys and four bays, and a later rear extension on the left. In the centre is a full height canted bay window with a pyramidal roof, and the other windows are sashes. | II |
| Clumber House; 53.05284°N 0.91849°W | | Early 19th century | A house and a cottage, later combined, in red brick that has a tile roof with brick coped gables and kneelers. The main range has two storeys and five bays. On the front are two doorways, one with a fanlight, the other blocked, and sash windows. The ground floor openings have segmental arches. To the right is a recessed single-bay wing, and at the rear are two later wings. | II |
