= Morton, Nottinghamshire =

Village in Nottinghamshire, England

Coordinates: 53.05°N 0.92°W

Morton
- Village
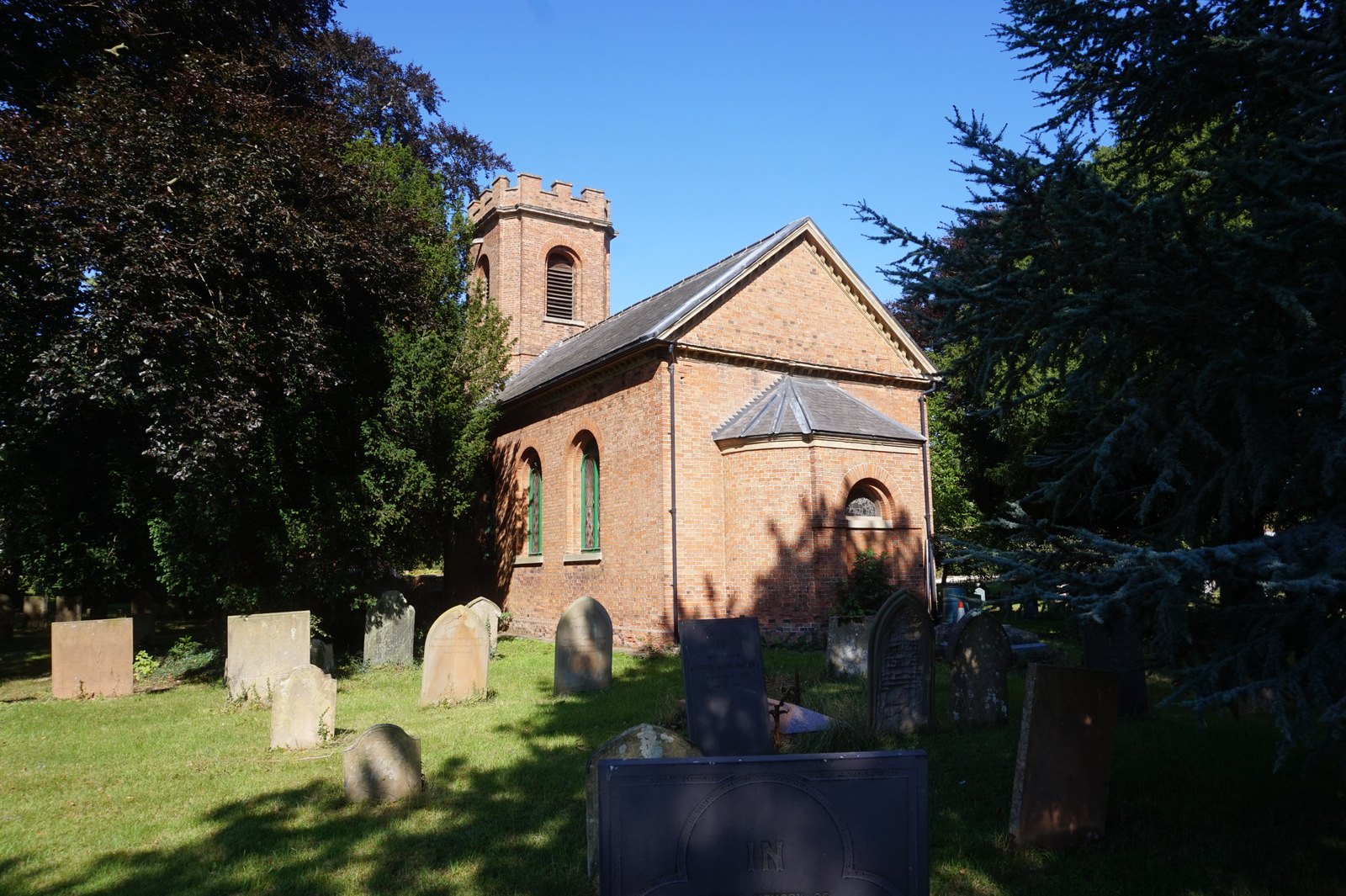
- St Denis Church

- Location within Nottinghamshire
- OS grid reference: SK726511
- Civil parish: Fiskerton cum Morton
- District: Newark and Sherwood
- Shire county: Nottinghamshire
- Region: East Midlands
- Country: England
- Sovereign state: United Kingdom
- Post town: NEWARK
- Postcode district: NG25
- Police: Nottinghamshire
- Fire: Nottinghamshire
- Ambulance: East Midlands
- Website: https://fiskertoncummorton.co.uk/your-parish-council

Morton is a village and former civil parish, now in the parish of Fiskerton cum Morton, in the Newark and Sherwood district, in the county of Nottinghamshire, England. It is located 1 mile west of Fiskerton. The parish church of St Denis was built in 1756.

In 1881 the parish had a population of 109. On 25 March 1884 the parish was abolished and merged with Fiskerton to form "Fiskerton cum Morton".

== See also ==
- Listed buildings in Fiskerton cum Morton
