= Listed buildings in Rolleston, Nottinghamshire =

Rolleston is a civil parish in the Newark and Sherwood district of Nottinghamshire, England. The parish contains eight listed buildings that are recorded in the National Heritage List for England. Of these, one is listed at Grade I, the highest of the three grades, and the others are at Grade II, the lowest grade. The parish contains the village of Rolleston and the surrounding area. All the listed building are in or near the village, and consist of a church, a sundial in the churchyard, a village cross, a watermill, houses, a cottage, and a barn.

== Key ==
Grade	Criteria
I	Buildings of exceptional interest, sometimes considered to be internationally important
II	Buildings of national importance and special interest

== Buildings ==
Name and location	Photograph	Date	Notes	Grade
Holy Trinity Church; 53.06466°N 0.89438°W		12th century	The church has been altered and extended through the centuries, including restorations during the 19th century. It is built in stone with slate roofs, and consists of a nave with a clerestory, north and south aisles, a south porch, a chancel and a west tower. The tower has four stages, angle buttresses, a moulded plinth, eight gargoyles, and an embattled parapet with eight crocketed pinnacles, the middle one on each side corbelled out. The south doorway is Norman, with an inner chamfered round arch with impost bands and a hood mould decorated with a billet motif.	I
Village cross 53.06497°N 0.89208°W		14th century	The remains of the village cross are in stone, and consist of a portion of the shaft on a platform, with lead flashing around the base.	II
Sundial; 53.06441°N 0.89446°W		1718	The sundial in the churchyard of Holy Trinity Church is in stone, and consists of an octagonal shaft 1 metre (3 ft 3 in) high. It has a square top with the remains of a lead sundial, and on the sides of the shaft are inscriptions and the date.	II
Rolleston Manor; 53.06527°N 0.89384°W		Early 18th century	A red brick house with a blue brick band at the base, a floor band, dentilled and dogtooth eaves with a band below, and a tile roof with bargeboards. There are two storeys and attics, three bays, and rear extensions. The windows are sashes under segmental arches.	II
Barn, Rolleston Manor; 53.06546°N 0.89358°W	—	Early 18th century	The barn is in red brick, with dentilled eaves, and a roof of tile and pantile with raised brick coped gables and kneelers. There are two storeys and three bays. On the front are a blocked arch containing a small horizontally-sliding sash window, a doorway with a fanlight under a segmental arch, another doorway, and two tripartite casement windows.	II
Mill at Mill Farm; 53.06697°N 0.89746°W		Late 18th century	The mill, granary and bridge are in red brick with pantile roofs. The mill has two storeys, an attic and a basement, and three bays, and to the left is the granary with a single storey and loft, and three bays. The windows are horizontally-sliding sashes; some of the openings have segmental heads. In front is a bridge with a brick and concrete parapet.	II
Sunnyside; 53.06789°N 0.88909°W		Late 18th century	The cottage is in red brick with a raised eaves band and a pantile roof. There is a single storey and attics, five bays, and lean-to extensions at the rear. On the front are doorways and horizontally-sliding sash windows, the openings in the ground floor under segmental arches.	II
The Vicarage; 53.06506°N 0.89515°W		c. 1840	The vicarage is in painted brick with an eaves band, and a hipped slate roof with overhanging eaves on brackets. There are two storeys, three bays, the middle bay projecting and gabled, and a two-storey three-bay rear wing. The central doorway has a fanlight and a hood on brackets, and the windows are sashes.	
