= Lands common to Axminster and Kilmington =

Coordinates: 50.7747°N 3.0190°W

- Location within Devon
- Civil parish: Axminster Kilmington
- District: East Devon
- Shire county: Devon
- Region: South West
- Country: England
- Sovereign state: United Kingdom

The lands common to Axminster and Kilmington civil parishes are an area of meadowland on the banks of the River Axe that is shared between the civil parishes of Axminster and Kilmington in East Devon. The lands common to the two parishes are close to Newenham Abbey, which is in the parish of Axminster.

Some contemporary administrative documents treat the descriptive phrase "Lands common to Axminster and Kilmington" (or a similar variation) as the name of a civil parish in its own right.
