= Holy Trinity Church, Rolleston =

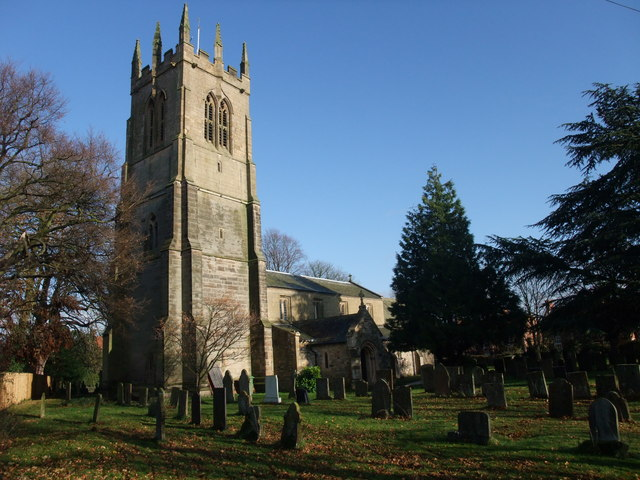
- Holy Trinity Church, Rolleston
- Holy Trinity Church, Rolleston
- 53°3′51.93″N 0°53′40.10″W
- OS grid reference: SK 74185 52503
- Location: Rolleston, Nottinghamshire
- Country: England
- Denomination: Church of England

History
- Dedication: Holy Trinity

Architecture
- Heritage designation: Grade I listed

Administration
- Diocese: Diocese of Southwell and Nottingham
- Archdeaconry: Newark
- Deanery: Newark and Southwell
- Parish: Rolleston

Holy Trinity Church, Rolleston is a parish church in the Church of England in Rolleston, Nottinghamshire.

== History ==
The church dates from the 12th century. The chancel was restored in 1878 and the tower in 1889 by Charles Hodgson Fowler.

The church is in a joint parish with:

- St Denis' Church, Morton
- St Peter and St Paul's Church, Upton

== Memorials ==
- Nicholas Lodge, 1612, north chancel
- Rev John Edwards 1804
- Luke Williamson
- Selina Hempsall 1750
- John Twentyman 1774
- John Twentyman 1750

== Organ ==
The church obtained an organ in 1933 which had been built in 1895 by Cousins of Lincoln, and was originally installed in Lincoln Cathedral Song School.

The current organ was formerly in HM Prison Nottingham. It was installed in Rolleston in 2008 by Henry Groves & Son. A specification of the organ can be found on the National Pipe Organ Register.

== See also ==
- Grade I listed buildings in Nottinghamshire
- Listed buildings in Rolleston, Nottinghamshire
