= St Denis' Church, Morton =

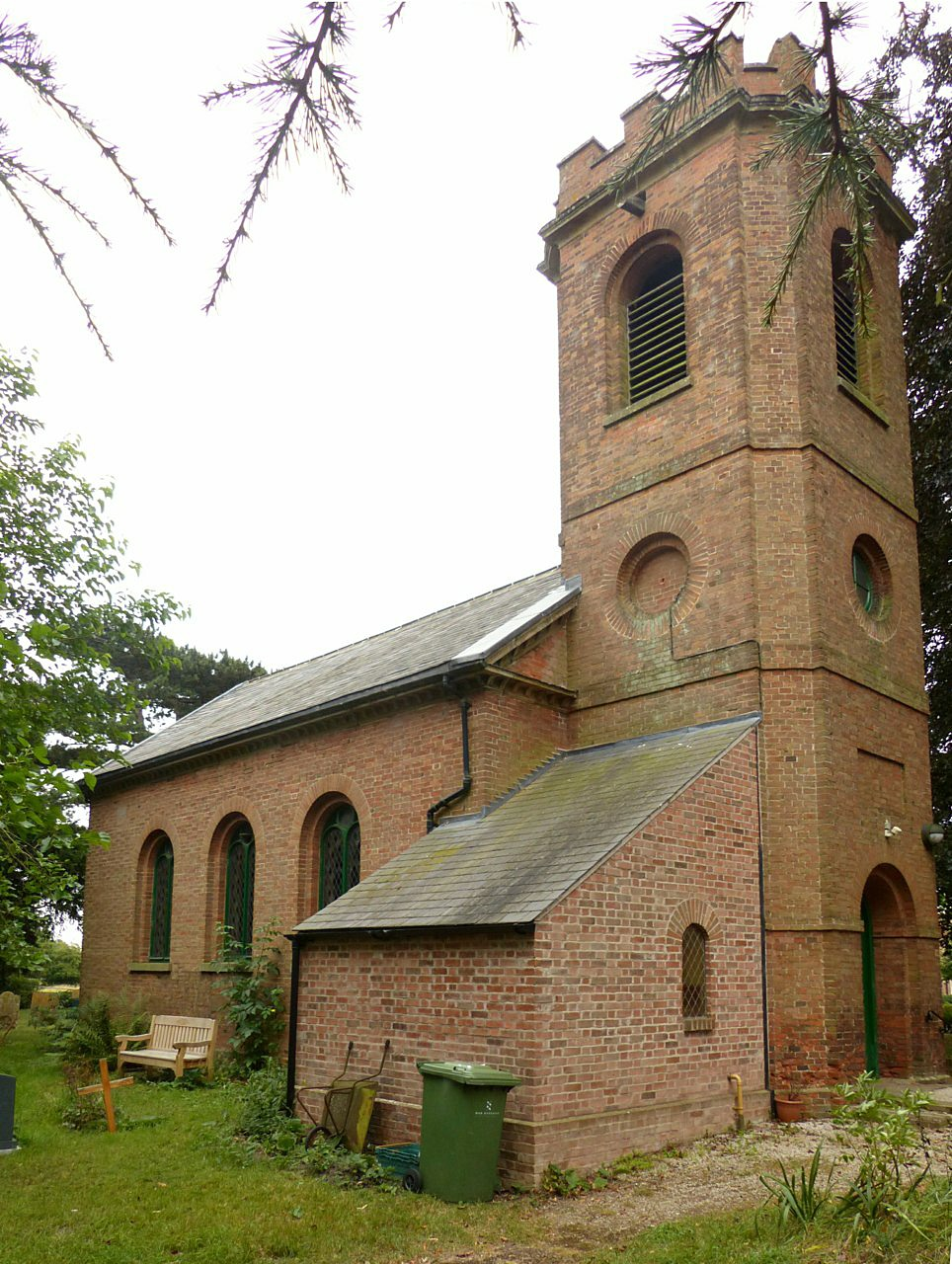
- St Denis' Church, Morton
- St Denis' Church, Morton
- 53°3′16.10″N 0°55′0.52″W
- OS grid reference: SK 72700 51357
- Location: Morton, Nottinghamshire
- Country: England
- Denomination: Church of England

History
- Dedication: St Denis
- Dedicated: 1756

Architecture
- Heritage designation: Grade II* listed

Administration
- Diocese: Diocese of Southwell and Nottingham
- Archdeaconry: Newark
- Deanery: Newark and Southwell
- Parish: Morton

St Denis' Church, Morton is a Grade II* listed parish church in the Church of England in Morton, Nottinghamshire.

== History ==
The church dates from 1756.

The church is in a joint parish with:

- St Peter and St Paul's Church, Upton
- Holy Trinity Church, Rolleston

== Organ ==
The current organ was installed in 1967 by Cantril of Castle Donington. It was originally built by W Hadfield of London.

== See also ==
- Listed buildings in Fiskerton cum Morton
