= Richard Thomas Parker =

Richard Thomas "Tom" Parker (1834 – 10 August 1864) was an English butcher and the last person to be publicly executed in Nottingham. In a drunken row with his father, Parker shot his parents, killing his mother. He was found guilty of murder and sentenced to execution. He was hanged on the steps of the County Hall on 10 August 1864.

== Early life ==
Parker was born about 1834 in England, the son of Samuel Parker and Elizabeth (née Tutbury) Hart Parker. He was christened in Thurgarton, Nottinghamshire on 26 October 1834. Samuel's parents married after his mother had been widowed. Elizabeth's first husband had been a wealthy man and Parker had four half-brothers from his mother's first marriage. Parker's father was a labourer. He was the only child of his parents' marriage.

Samuel Parker was a butcher. In November 1862, he was publicly declared bankrupt at Newark, Nottinghamshire. At the time of the fateful event, Parker and his wife had been separated and Parker was living with his parents in their house in Fiskerton, Nottinghamshire.

== Crime ==
On 29 March 1864, during a drunken row with his father, Parker shot his parents. His father survived but his mother died weeks later from her injuries on 16 May 1864. She was 76.

Parker was tried at Nottingham Crown Court. The court sat at Shire Hall, Nottingham in a trial that began on Monday 25 July 1864 before Mr Justice Blackburn. Parker was represented by Sergeant O'Brien who tried to argue for manslaughter. Parker was found guilty of wilful murder by the jury and condemned to death by execution.

== Execution ==
Parker's execution was held publicly on the steps of the County Hall. Barriers were erected on the High Pavement for the safety of the public. Parker was hanged in front of a large crowd of approximately 10,000 at 8:00 am on 10 August 1864.

After hanging on the gallows for an hour, the body was cut down and buried. He was 29.
