= Fiskerton cum Morton =

Coordinates: 53.0538°N 0.9118°W

- Civil parish
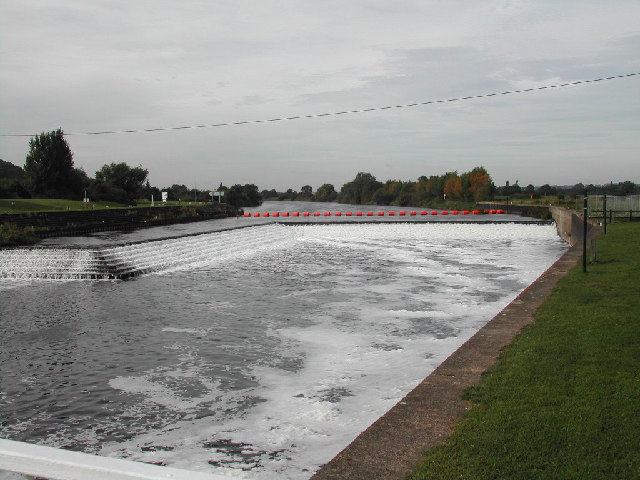
- Hazelford Weir at the River Trent

- Location within Nottinghamshire
- Interactive map of Fiskerton cum Morton
- Area: 2.46 sq mi (6.4 km^{2})
- Population: 803 (2021)
  - Density: 326/sq mi (126/km^{2})
- Created: 1884
- OS grid reference: SK 7351
  - London: 112 mi (180 km) SE
- District: Newark and Sherwood
- Shire county: Nottinghamshire
- Region: East Midlands
- Country: England
- Sovereign state: United Kingdom
- Settlements: Fiskerton, Morton
- Post town: SOUTHWELL
- Postcode district: NG25
- Dialling code: 01636
- Police: Nottinghamshire
- Fire: Nottinghamshire
- Ambulance: East Midlands
- UK Parliament: Newark
- Website: fiskertoncummorton.co.uk

Fiskerton cum Morton is a civil parish in the Newark and Sherwood district, within the county of Nottinghamshire, England. The overall area had a population of 803 at the 2021 census. The parish lies in the south east of the county. It is 112 miles north of London, 12 miles north east of the city of Nottingham, 5 miles west of the town of Newark-on-Trent and 2 1/2 miles south east of the town of Southwell. The parish lies along the bank of the River Trent and is primarily a commuter residential area to both Nottingham and Newark.

== Geography ==
=== Location ===
The parish is surrounded by the following local areas:

- Rolleston and Upton to the north
- Bleasby, Elston, Flintham and Syerston to the south
- East Stoke, Farndon and Thorpe to the east
- Southwell and Halloughton to the west.

=== Settlements ===
The parish consists of two settlements:

- Fiskerton
- Morton

==== Fiskerton ====
Fiskerton is based in the eastern portion of the parish, lying just to the left of the River Trent. It is the larger of the two areas, clustered around a few roads by the riverside.

==== Morton ====
This lies 1 kilometre (0.62 mi) west of Fiskerton. It is a hamlet clustered around two roads, Main Street and Middle Lane.

=== Landscape ===
Predominantly, many of the parish residents are clustered around the villages. Outside of these is a scattering of farms, farmhouses and cottages amongst a wider rural setting.

The Robin Hood Way long-distance path runs along the western and eastern boundaries of the parish.

==== Water features ====
The key river through the area is the River Trent, forming the eastern edge of the area. Several other watercourses run through the area and are tributaries:

- River Greet forms the east boundary of the parish
- Beck Dyke forms the north boundary of the parish
- Marlock Dyke in the central area amongst the settlements
- Holme Dyke in the south of the parish.

Hazelford Weir and lock span one of the River Trent channels at the split by The Nabbs island in the south of the parish, and is navigable.

==== Land elevation ====
The parish is relatively low-lying. The land height varies from 15 metres (49 ft) along much of the River Trent, to 45 metres (148 ft) in the west.

== Governance and demography ==
Although discrete settlements, and prior to 1884 were previous parishes, Fiskerton and Morton were merged administratively and since then managed locally as one unit by the Fiskerton cum Morton Parish Council.

At district level, the wider area is managed by Newark and Sherwood District Council, and by Nottinghamshire County Council at its highest tier.

The overall area had a population of 902 at the 2011 census, which fell to 803 in 2021.

== History ==
=== Toponymy ===
Morton is mentioned in the Domesday Book in 1086 with a spelling of “Mortune”, meaning farm or settlement in the mor (marsh or moor), and later becoming Moreton. Fiskerton was derived from the abundance of fish in the local rivers. It was given the name “Fiscere” adding the suffix “tun”, the meaning being “the farm of the fishermen. In the Domesday Book it appears as “Fiscartune” and later, Fiskartune. The Fiskerton cum Morton civil parish was created in 1884, merging the then individual parishes.

=== Heritage ===
Walter D’Aincourt was recorded in the Domesday Book as the main landowner in the area. Walter's son, Ralph d’Aincourt, founded Thurgarton Priory, and also granting Fiskerton as part of the endowment. Fiskerton remained under the control of the Priory until the time of the Dissolution in 1538. During this time there was a chapel dedicated to St. Mary, the site of which appeared on various maps until the early 20th century.

Several landowners followed, including the Cressovers, and in particular the de Annesly family whose estate passed through marriage to John Ashwell, who built Ashwell Hall. This was the manor house of its day and was described by Thoroton in his History of Nottinghamshire published in 1677 as a “capital messuage”. Like Fiskerton, the manorial lands of Morton were eventually granted by Elizabeth 1st to Thomas Cooper and then to the Plumptre family from 1649, and then the Wrights from 1857. Enclosure of the open fields took place in Morton between 1839 and 1841. The remnants of the Manor Estate were sold in 1968 and most now form part of Morton Manor Farm.

Local industries by 1842 included wharfs, coal yards and warehouses along the river front. Malting was by this time part of the economy and the Newark brewer James Hole, had a large malthouse here. There also was a watermill, and a windmill on Station Road. A key development was the opening of the Nottingham-Lincoln railway in August 1846 with the station half a mile from the village centre. By the end of the 18th century, many wharves and warehouses had disappeared and in their place large residences such as Fiskerton House and Fiskerton Manor, were added to the riverside.

The large malthouse, referred in present times as The Wharf, closed in 1904 when James Hole concentrated his business in Newark, and some employees moved from Fiskerton. The premises was eventually bought as a grain store around 1919, by Southwell miller C.G. Caudwell, and the wharf used for loading and unloading materials destined for the Southwell corn mill. The Caudwells owned it until c.1974 when it was then used for a boat building business, and eventually in the 1980s it was sold for residential purposes.

== Landmarks ==
=== Church of St. Denis ===
The Morton church dates from 1758, though there has been a church in the area since medieval times, the earliest reference is to a chapel of ease dedicated to St. Denis being established in Morton in the reign of King Stephen (1096-1154). It was founded by locals so they could continue divine service in Morton, the parish church of Southwell being “farre from them”.

=== Listed buildings and conservation areas ===
As well as conservation areas defined for Fiskerton and Morton, several buildings and residences are designated as local features of historical interest, including the Bromley Arms public house, and notably the Church of St Denis at Grade II*. There is also a scheduled ancient monument site immediately outside the Morton village by the southern boundary, where aerial photographs showed from the layout of the land a complex settlement dating from Iron-Age or Romano-British times. There are also several cropmarks surrounding the village that demonstrate the presence of buried historical remnants.

== Transport ==
=== Fiskerton railway station ===
The station was opened on 4 August 1846 by the Midland Railway. It is sited 1 kilometre (0.62 mi) north west of Fiskerton and has basic amenities. It is presently managed by the East Midlands Railway.
