= Meering =

Civil parish in Nottinghamshire, England

Coordinates: 53.183°N 0.778°W

- Civil parish
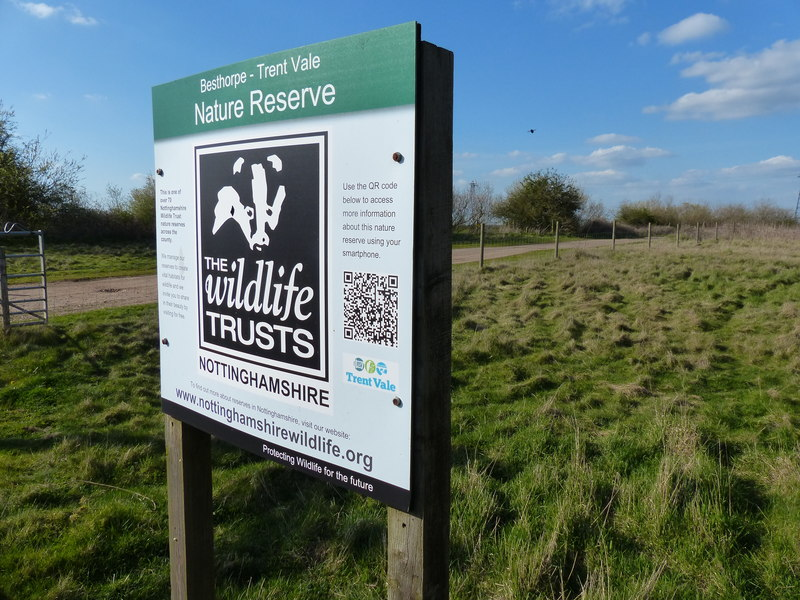
- Besthorpe Nature Reserve next to the River Trent

- Location within Nottinghamshire
- Interactive map of Meering
- Area: 0.75 sq mi (1.9 km^{2})
- Population: 0 (2021)
  - Density: 0/sq mi (0/km^{2})
- OS grid reference: SK 813648
  - London: 115 mi (185 km) SSE
- District: Newark and Sherwood
- Shire county: Nottinghamshire
- Region: East Midlands
- Country: England
- Sovereign state: United Kingdom
- Postcode district: NG23

Meering is a geographically small civil parish in the Newark and Sherwood district of Nottinghamshire, England. With a population of zero (2021 census), it is grouped with Girton to form a parish meeting. The parish was originally an extra-parochial area, and was once populated, although not in more than single figures since census records began.

The parish is bound by the Carlton Rack meanders of the River Trent to the west (which forms the border with Sutton on Trent) and to the east a lagoon and a brook called The Fleet which is thought to be an old Trent channel, separates it from Girton civil parish.

Besthorpe Nature Reserve, despite taking the name of the nearby village of Besthorpe, is within Meering parish, Known as Meering Marsh, it is an area of marsh land supported by the Nottinghamshire Wildlife Trust that is attractive to wading birds and other wildlife.

== History ==
Meering was named in the 1086 Domesday Book as 'Meringe' and had no recorded population. It was held by William the Conqueror, and afterwards passed to the Earl of Richmond, with Richard de Sutton of Sutton in Ashfield having oversight of the Meering area. Later family relations had the Meering name while residing there from the 12th century, and held it and wider land within the county. Two members of the family, William Meryng and William Meering were Members of Parliament for Nottinghamshire in the 15th and 16th century.

By the 20th century only one property remained to the west of the parish. The whole area was farmland until World War II, when the lower portion of the parish was mined for gravel and sand. By 1999, Nottinghamshire Wildlife Trust had taken over the long-term lease of the pits from Lafarge Aggregates, Meering Marsh was created from the flooded excavated areas and currently comprises three habitat types; reedbeds, open water with islands and shingle.

== External sites ==
- Besthorpe Nature Reserve - Nottinghamshire Wildlife Trust
