= Rolleston, Nottinghamshire =

Village and civil parish in Nottinghamshire, England

Coordinates: 53.066°N 0.891°W

Rolleston
- Village and civil parish
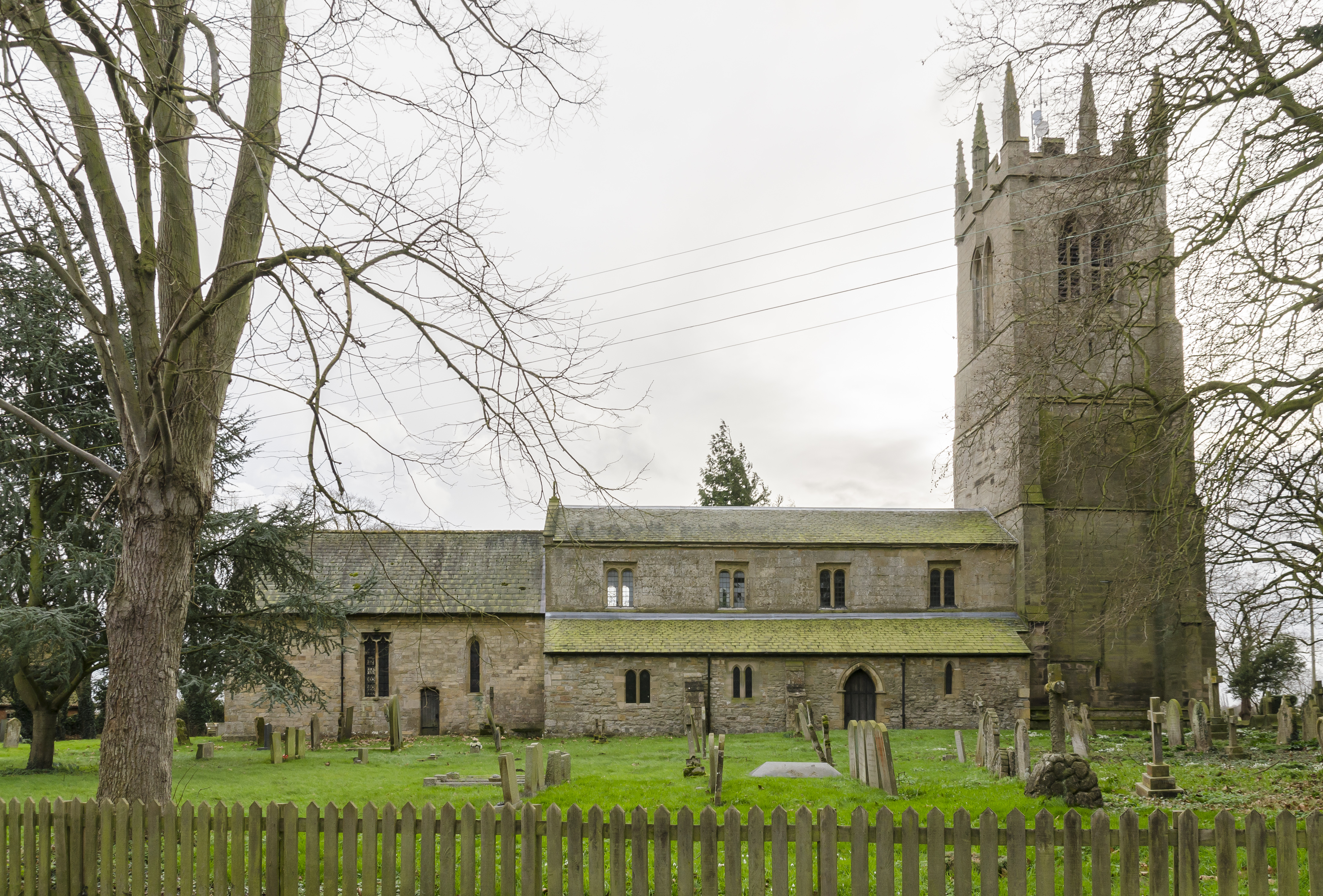
- Holy Trinity church, Rolleston

- Location within Nottinghamshire
- Interactive map of Rolleston
- Area: 2.62 sq mi (6.8 km^{2})
- Population: 342 (2021)
  - Density: 131/sq mi (51/km^{2})
- OS grid reference: SK 74303 52692
  - London: 110 mi (180 km) SSE
- District: Newark and Sherwood
- Shire county: Nottinghamshire
- Region: East Midlands
- Country: England
- Sovereign state: United Kingdom
- Post town: Newark
- Postcode district: NG23
- Dialling code: 0115
- Police: Nottinghamshire
- Fire: Nottinghamshire
- Ambulance: East Midlands
- UK Parliament: Newark

Rolleston is a small village and civil parish in Nottinghamshire by the River Greet (a tributary of the River Trent), a few miles from Southwell not far from the Trent and about 5 miles (8.0 km) southwest of Newark. The population of the civil parish at the 2011 census was 312, increasing to 342 at the 2021 census. It has a church dedicated to the Holy Trinity. It lies close to the railway line between Nottingham and Lincoln with a station serving the village and Southwell as well as the nearby Southwell Racecourse.

== History ==
According to White's Directory of Nottinghamshire, published in 1853, the parish

"contains the two townships of Rolleston and Fiskerton, which contain together 583 inhabitants and 2,583a 3r 23p of rich loamy land, of which 280 inhabitants and 1,585 acres (6.41 km^{2}) are in Rolleston and 303 inhabitants and 998a 3r 7p are in Fiskerton, which is included in the Southwell division of Thurgarton hundred. Rolleston is a pleasant village 3 miles (4.8 km) east by south of Southwell, bounded on the south and east by the Trent, and intersected by the River Greet. The church is an ancient structure, dedicated to the Holy Trinity, with a tower and four bells. The living, a vicarage, is valued in the King's books at £10 1s 3d, now £246. The Chapter of Southwell are patrons, and the Rev. Robert Fowler incumbent. The vicarage, a neat brick house near the church, was built in 1844. John Henry Manners Sutton Esq. M.P. is lessee of the great tithe, under the Chapter of Southwell, lord of the manor, and principal owner. The poor have the interest of £130, bequeathed by Sir Thomas Lodge, Diana Gibson, Luke Williamson and Nicholas Kirkby."

== See also ==
- Listed buildings in Rolleston, Nottinghamshire
