= Fiskerton, Nottinghamshire =

Village in Nottinghamshire, England

Coordinates: 53.052°N 0.904°W

Fiskerton
- Village
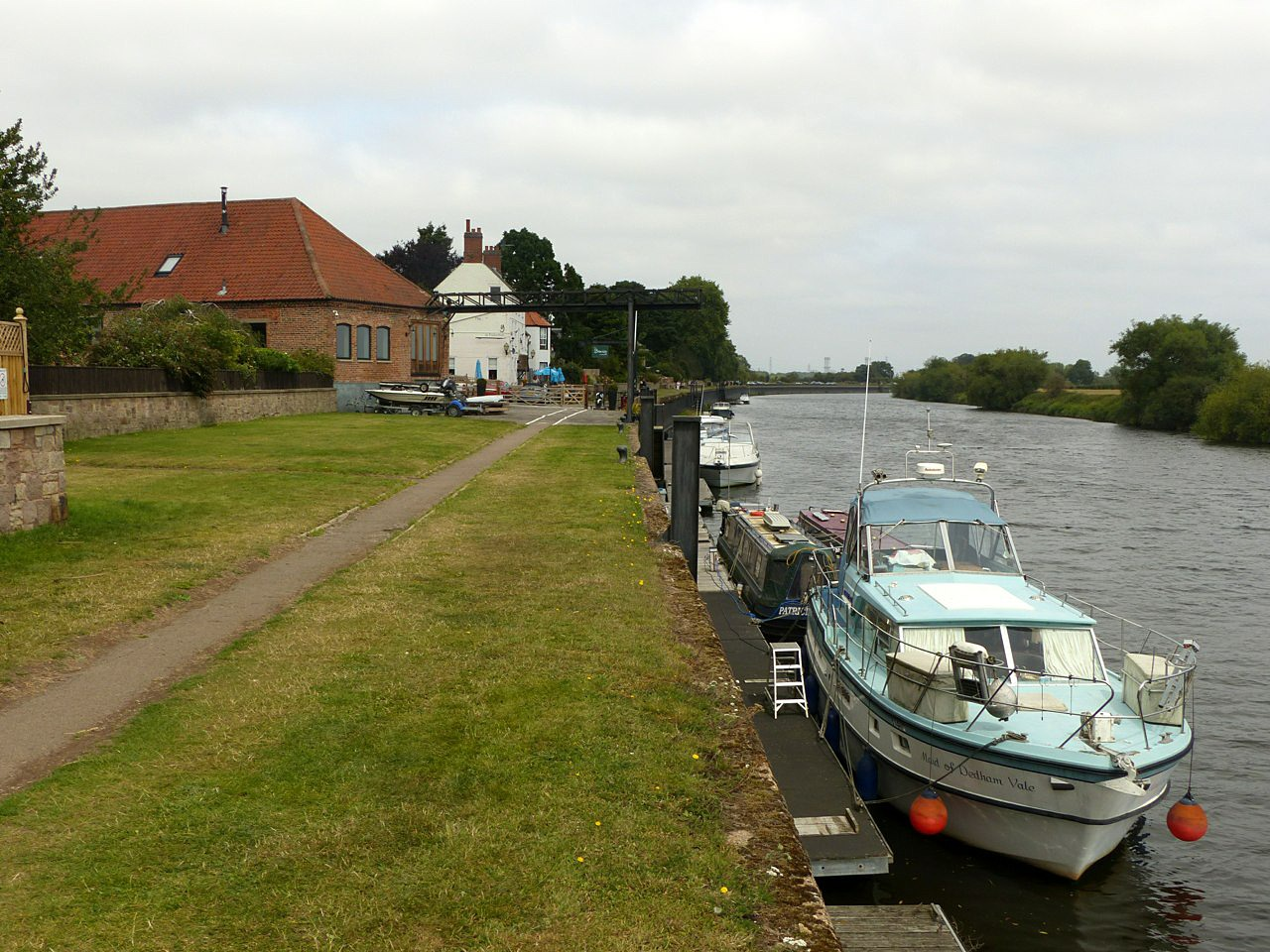
- River Trent at Fiskerton

- Location within Nottinghamshire
- Population: 902 (2011 Census)
- Civil parish: Fiskerton cum Morton
- District: Newark and Sherwood
- Shire county: Nottinghamshire
- Region: East Midlands
- Country: England
- Sovereign state: United Kingdom
- Post town: SOUTHWELL
- Postcode district: NG25
- Police: Nottinghamshire
- Fire: Nottinghamshire
- Ambulance: East Midlands
- UK Parliament: Newark
- Website: https://fiskertoncummorton.co.uk/

Fiskerton is a village in the civil parish of Fiskerton cum Morton, in the Newark and Sherwood district, in the county of Nottinghamshire, England. It is on the west bank of the River Trent about 3 miles southeast of Southwell. The waterfront is home to million-pound residential properties, previously residences of merchants and businessmen who commuted in the 1800s to nearby Nottingham by rail from Fiskerton Station.

== Toponymy ==
The word 'Fiskerton' contains the Old Norse word fiskari (or the Old English equivalent fiscere) meaning a fisherman, together with tun (Old English), a farmstead, resulting in 'Fishermen's farm/settlement'.

== History ==
The 1086 Domesday entry for Fiskerton mentioned arable land enough for seven ploughs, two mills, a fishery, a ferry and 42 acres of meadow, pasture and woodland.

Fishing and agriculture remained important, but with close proximity to the River Trent, Fiskerton developed other industries. By 1842 there were wharfs, coal yards and warehouses along the river front together with a large malthouse owned by Newark brewer, James Hole. There was a watermill on the River Greet and a windmill on what is now Station Road.

An important development was the opening of the Nottingham to Lincoln railway in August 1846 with the station close to the village centre. By the end of the century, many wharfs and warehouses had disappeared, replaced by substantial residences like Fiskerton House and Fiskerton Manor on the riverside.

Fiskerton was formerly a township in the parish of Rolleston, from 1866 Fiskerton was a civil parish in its own right, on 25 March 1884 the parish was abolished to form "Fiskerton cum Morton", part also went to East Stoke. In 1881 the parish had a population of 283.

The large malthouse on The Wharf closed in 1904 when James Hole decided to concentrate business in Newark, the premises being converted into a grain-store, with the wharf used for loading and unloading materials destined for Southwell corn mill. In the 1970s it became a boat-building business and then in the 1980s a private residence.

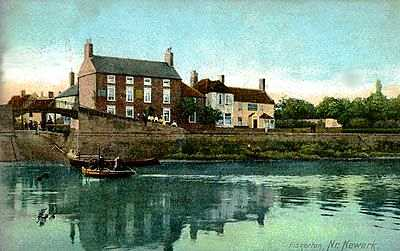
Fiskerton Ferry from a tinted postcard c.1907 with the large redbrick building mostly-known as Bromley Arms

Until the 1950s there was a ferry boat service over to the other side of the River Trent at Stoke Field. Fiskerton Mill lies on the River Greet a few hundred yards upstream from its junction with the River Trent.

Fiskerton Windmill was a wooden postmill with a substantial brick roundhouse, standing off Station Road. A mill was marked at this site on Chapman's map of 1774. The mill ceased working some time in the last quarter of the 19th century. Only the roundhouse now remains.

Richard Thomas Parker, who murdered his mother in Fiskerton in 1864, was the last person to be publicly hanged in Nottingham.

The village of Fiskerton is also known in Evangelical Christian circles as the homeplace of Henri and Connie Staples, who lived there from 1964 to 2000 and regularly held 'revival meetings' in the Methodist Chapel.

Residential development occurred within Fiskerton between 1960 and 2000s, including the Green Drive area in 2002, which gave the village a permanent open space known as the Village Green, culminating in Fiskerton being the commuter village of today.

== Fiskerton Cell ==
The village may have been home to a small monastic cell of Augustinian Canons, dependent on the nearby Thurgarton Priory. It may have been founded around 1139, and Ralph D'Aincourt (son of Walter D'Aincourt) is listed as a possible founder.

Doubt has been cast, however, on whether it was truly a monastic cell or a just a chapel/church. Ralph D'Aincourt founded the nearby Thurgarton Priory circa 1119–39, and gave the village of Fiskerton to that priory as part of its endowment. It is thought, therefore, that Fiskerton was not a cell but just a village chapel, with the canons of Thurgarton Priory serving as priests. The cell/chapel was believed to be dedicated to Saint Mary. There are no remains and its location has been lost.

== Amenities ==
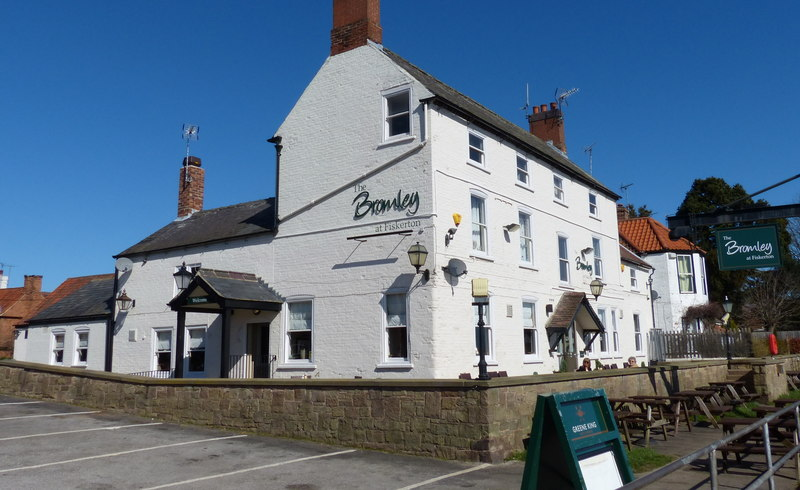
Bromley Arms

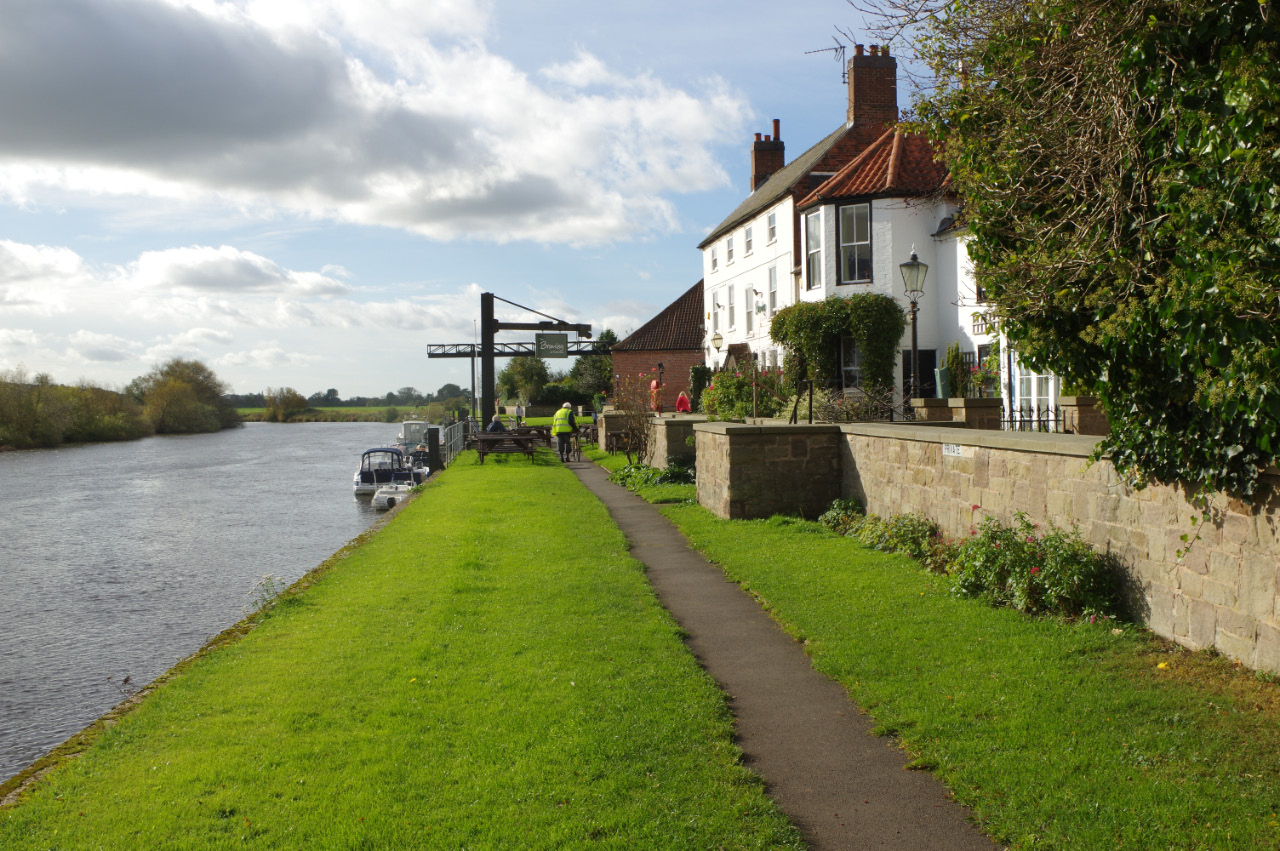
River Trent

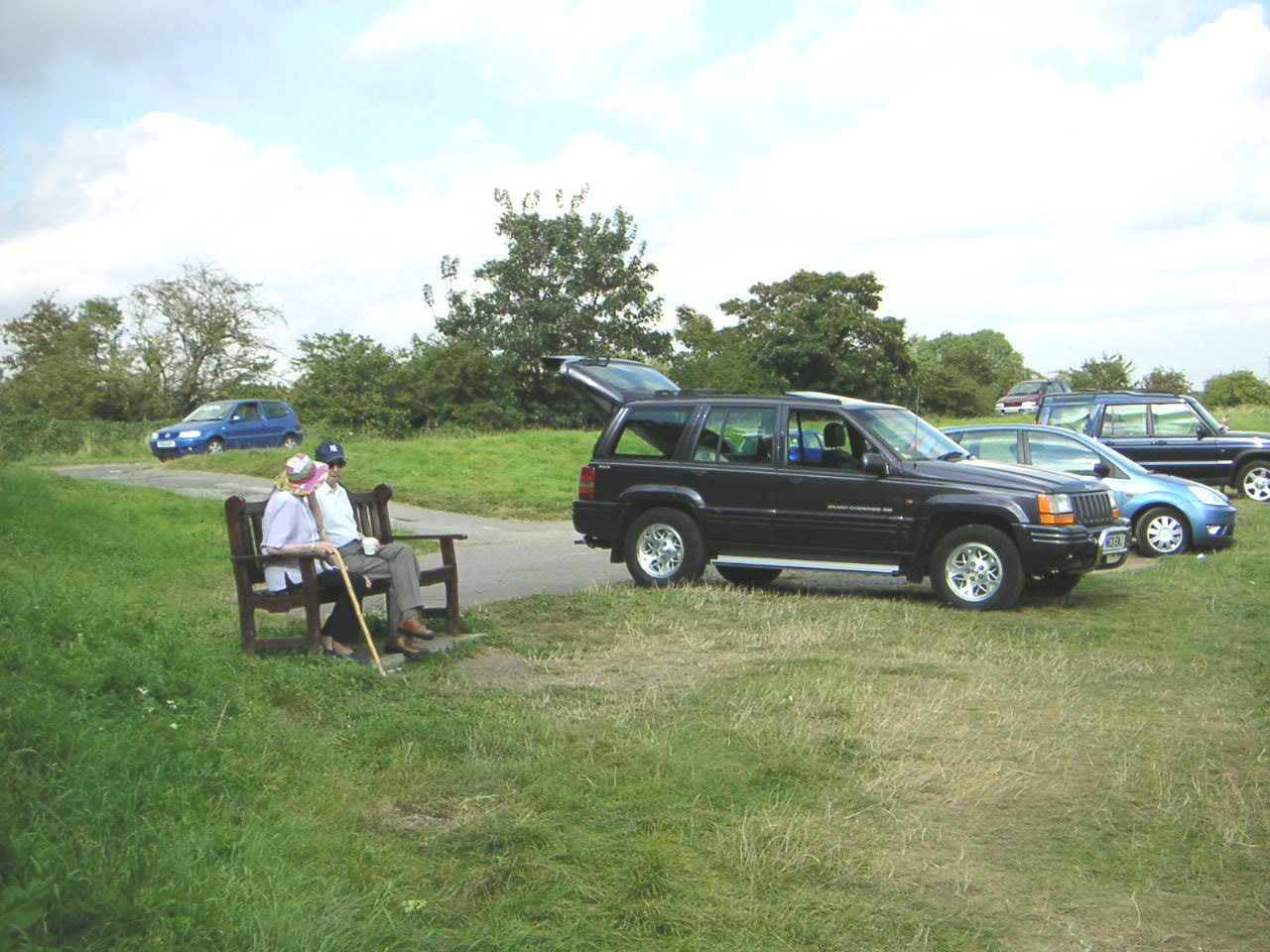
Picnicking at riverside informal parking area downstream of The Bromley, accessed off Main Street/Fiskerton Road

The village's location beside the Trent attracts walkers, picnickers and casual visitors in summer, centred on the riverside pub/restaurant (was called the Bromley Arms, renamed as The Bromley at Fiskerton in 2014) and used as a friendly café-type base also serving snacks and refreshments.

== See also ==
- Listed buildings in Fiskerton cum Morton
- Fiskerton railway station
