= Civil parish =

Territorial designation and lowest tier of local government in England

Civil parish (England)
- Map of English civil parishes
- Category: Parish
- Location: England
- Found in: Districts
- Created by: Various, see text
- Created: Various, see text
- Number: 10,464 (as of 2023)
- Possible types: City; Community; Neighbourhood; Parish; Town; Village
- Populations: 0–137,387 (Northampton)
- Government: City council; Community council; Neighbourhood council; Parish council; Town council; Village council

In England, a civil parish is a type of administrative parish used for local government. It is a territorial designation which is the lowest tier of local government. Civil parishes can trace their origin to the ancient system of parishes, which for centuries were the principal unit of secular and religious administration in most of England and Wales. Civil and religious parishes were formally split into two types in the 19th century and are now entirely separate. Civil parishes in their modern form came into being through the Local Government Act 1894 (56 & 57 Vict. c. 73), which established elected parish councils to take on the secular functions of the parish vestry.

A civil parish can range in size from a sparsely populated rural area with fewer than a hundred inhabitants, to a large town with a population in excess of 100,000. This scope is similar to that of municipalities in continental Europe, such as the communes of France. However, unlike their continental European counterparts, parish councils are not principal authorities, and in most cases have a relatively minor role in local government.

As of September 2023, there are 10,464 parishes in England, and in 2020 they covered approximately 40% of the English population. For historical reasons, civil parishes predominantly cover rural areas and smaller urban areas, with most larger urban areas being wholly or partly unparished; but since 1997 it has been possible for civil parishes to be created within unparished areas if demanded by local residents. In 2007 the right to create civil parishes was extended to London boroughs, although only one, Queen's Park, has so far been created.

Eight parishes also have city status (a status granted by the monarch). A civil parish may be equally known as and confirmed as a town, village, neighbourhood or community by resolution of its parish council, a right not conferred on other units of English local government. The governing body of a civil parish is usually an elected parish council (which can decide to call itself a town, village, community or neighbourhood council, or a city council if the parish has city status). Alternatively, in parishes with small populations (typically fewer than 150 electors) governance may be by a parish meeting which all electors may attend; alternatively, parishes with small populations may be grouped with one or more neighbours under a common parish council.

Wales was also divided into civil parishes until 1974, when they were replaced by communities, which are similar to English parishes in the way they operate. Civil parishes in Scotland were abolished for local government purposes by the Local Government (Scotland) Act 1929; the Scottish equivalent of English civil parishes are the community council areas established by the Local Government (Scotland) Act 1973, which have fewer powers than their English and Welsh counterparts. There are no equivalent units in Northern Ireland.

== History ==
The parish system in Europe was established between the 8th and 12th centuries, and an early form was long established in England by the time of the Norman Conquest. Parishes often shared their boundaries with manors, and a parish could contain multiple manors but a manor could also spread across two parishes.

Initially, churches and their priests were the gift and continued patronage (benefaction) of the lord of the manor, but not all were willing and able to provide, so residents would be expected to attend the church of the nearest manor that had one. Later, the churches and priests became to a greater extent the responsibility of the Catholic Church thus this was formalised; the grouping of manors into one parish was recorded, as was a manor-parish existing in its own right.

Boundaries changed little, and for centuries after 1180 'froze', despite changes to manors' extents. However, by subinfeudation, making a new smaller manor, there was a means of making a chapel which, if generating or endowed with enough funds, would generally justify foundation of a parish, with its own parish priest (and in latter centuries vestry). This consistency was a result of canon law which prized the status quo in issues between local churches and so made boundary changes and sub-division difficult.

The consistency of these boundaries until the 19th century is useful to historians, and is also of cultural significance in terms of shaping local identities; reinforced by the use of grouped parish boundaries, often, by successive local authority areas; and in a very rough, operations-geared way by most postcode districts. There was (and is) wide disparity in parish size. For example, Writtle in Essex traditionally measures 13,568 acres (21 mi^{2}) whereas two neighbouring parishes are Shellow Bowells at 469 acres (0.7 mi^{2}), and Chignall Smealy at 476 acres (0.7 mi^{2}).

Until the break with Rome, parishes managed ecclesiastical matters, while the manor was the principal unit of local administration and justice. Later, the church replaced the manor court as the rural administrative centre, and levied a local tax on produce known as a tithe. In the medieval period, responsibilities such as relief of the poor passed increasingly from the lord of the manor to the parish's rector, who in practice would delegate tasks among his vestry or the (often well-endowed) monasteries. After the dissolution of the monasteries, the power to levy a rate to fund relief of the poor was conferred on the parish authorities by the Poor Relief Act 1601. Both before and after this optional social change, local (vestry-administered) charities are well-documented.

The parish authorities were known as vestries and consisted of all the ratepayers of the parish. As the number of ratepayers of some parishes grew, it became increasingly difficult to convene meetings as an open vestry. In some, mostly built-up, areas the select vestry took over responsibility from the entire body of ratepayers. This innovation improved efficiency, but allowed governance by a self-perpetuating elite. The administration of the parish system relied on the monopoly of the established English Church, which for a few years after Henry VIII alternated between the Roman Catholic Church and the Church of England, before settling on the latter on the accession of Elizabeth I in 1558. By the 18th century, religious membership was becoming more fractured in some places, due in part to the progress of Methodism. The legitimacy of the parish vestry came into question, and the perceived inefficiency and corruption inherent in the system became a source for concern in some places. For this reason, during the early 19th century the parish progressively lost its powers to ad hoc boards and other organisations, such as the boards of guardians given responsibility for poor relief through the Poor Law Amendment Act 1834. Sanitary districts covered England in 1875 and Ireland three years later. The replacement boards were each entitled to levy their own rate in the parish; the church rate ceased to be levied in many parishes and became voluntary from 1868.

=== Civil and ecclesiastical split ===
During the 17th century it was found that the 1601 Poor Law did not work well for very large parishes, which were particularly common in northern England. Such parishes were typically subdivided into multiple townships, which levied their rates separately. The Poor Relief Act 1662 therefore directed that for poor law purposes 'parish' meant any place which maintained its own poor, thereby converting many townships into separate 'poor law parishes'.

As the administration of the poor laws was the main civil function of parishes, the Poor Law Amendment Act 1866, which received royal assent on 10 August 1866, declared all areas that levied a separate rate or had their own overseer of the poor to be parishes. This included the Church of England parishes (until then simply known as "parishes"), extra-parochial areas, townships and chapelries. To have collected rates this means these beforehand had their own vestries, boards or equivalent bodies. Parishes using this definition subsequently became known as "civil parishes" to distinguish them from the ecclesiastical parishes.

The Church of England parishes, which cover more than 99% of England, have become officially (and to avoid ambiguity) termed ecclesiastical parishes. The limits of many of these have diverged; most greatly through changes in population and church attendance (these factors can cause churches to be opened or closed). Since 1921, each has been the responsibility of its own parochial church council.

In the late 19th century, most of the "ancient" (a legal term equivalent to time immemorial) irregularities inherited by the civil parish system were cleaned up, and the majority of exclaves were abolished. The census of 1911 noted that 8,322 (58%) of "parishes" in England and Wales were not geographically identical when comparing the civil to the ecclesiastical form.

=== 1894 reforms ===
In 1894, civil parishes were reformed by the Local Government Act 1894 (56 & 57 Vict. c. 73) to become the smallest geographical area for local government in rural areas. The act abolished the civil (non-ecclesiastical) duties of vestries. Parishes which straddled county boundaries or sanitary districts had to be split so that the part in each urban or rural sanitary district became a separate parish (see List of county exclaves in England and Wales 1844–1974). The sanitary districts were then reconstituted as urban districts and rural districts, with parishes that fell within urban districts classed as urban parishes, and parishes that fell within rural districts were classed as rural parishes.

==== Rural parishes ====
The 1894 act established elected civil parish councils as to all rural parishes with more than 300 electors, and established annual parish meetings in all rural parishes. Civil parishes were grouped to form either rural or urban districts which are thereafter classified as either type. The parish meetings for parishes with a population of between 100 and 300 could request their county council to establish a parish council. Provision was also made for a grouped parish council to be established covering two or more rural parishes. In such groups, each parish retained its own parish meeting which could vote to leave the group, but otherwise the grouped parish council acted across the combined area of the parishes included.

==== Urban parishes ====
Urban civil parishes were not given their own parish councils, but were directly administered by the council of the urban district or borough in which they were contained. Many urban parishes were coterminous (geographically identical) with the urban district or municipal borough in which they lay. Towns which included multiple urban parishes often consolidated the urban parishes into one. The urban parishes continued to be used as an electoral area for electing guardians to the poor law unions. The unions took in areas in multiple parishes and had a set number of guardians for each parish, hence a final purpose of urban civil parishes. With the abolition of the Poor Law system in 1930, urban parishes became a geographical division only with no administrative power; that was exercised at the urban district or borough council level. The 1961 United Kingdom census ended the practice of routinely enumerating data for urban parishes, although local authorities could pay a fee to have it produced.

=== 1965–1974 reforms ===
In 1965 civil parishes in London were formally abolished when Greater London was created, as the legislative framework for Greater London did not make provision for any local government body below a London borough. (Since the new county was beforehand a mixture of metropolitan boroughs, municipal boroughs and urban districts, no extant parish councils were abolished.)

In 1974, the Local Government Act 1972 retained rural parishes, but abolished most urban parishes, as well as the urban districts and boroughs which had administered them. Provision was made for smaller urban districts and boroughs to become successor parishes, with a boundary coterminous with an existing urban district or borough or, if divided by a new district boundary, as much as was comprised in a single district. There were 300 such successor parishes established. In urban areas that were considered too large to be single parishes, the parishes were simply abolished, and they became unparished areas. The distinction between types of parish was no longer made; whether parishes continued by virtue of being retained rural parishes or were created as successor parishes, they were all simply termed parishes. The 1972 act allowed the new district councils (outside London) to review their parishes, and many areas left unparished in 1972 have since been made parishes, either in whole or part. For example, Hinckley, whilst entirely unparished in 1974, now has four civil parishes, which together cover part of its area, whilst the central part of the town remains unparished.

=== Sub-divisions ===
Some parishes were sub-divided into smaller territories known as hamlets, tithings or townships.

=== Revival ===
Nowadays the creation of town and parish councils is encouraged in unparished areas. The Local Government and Rating Act 1997 created a procedure which gave residents in unparished areas the right to demand that a new parish and parish council be created. This right was extended to London boroughs by the Local Government and Public Involvement in Health Act 2007 – with this, the City of London is at present the only part of England where civil parishes cannot be created. If enough electors in the area of a proposed new parish (ranging from 50% in an area with less than 500 electors to 10% in one with more than 2,500) sign a petition demanding its creation, then the local district council or unitary authority must consider the proposal.

Since the beginning of the 21st century, numerous parish councils have been created, including some relatively large urban ones. The main driver has been the desire to have a more local tier of government when new larger authorities have been created, which are felt to be remote from local concerns and identity. A number of parishes have been created in places which used to have their own borough or district council; examples include Daventry (2003), Folkestone (2004), Kidderminster (2015) and Sutton Coldfield (2016). The trend towards the creation of geographically large unitary authorities has been a spur to the creation of new parishes in some larger towns which were previously unparished, in order to retain a local tier of government; examples include Shrewsbury (2009), Salisbury (2009), Crewe (2013) and Weymouth (2019). In 2003 seven new parish councils were set up for Burton upon Trent, and in 2001 the Milton Keynes urban area became entirely parished, with ten new parishes being created.

Parishes can also be abolished where there is evidence that this is in response to "justified, clear and sustained local support" from the area's inhabitants. Examples are Birtley, which was abolished in 2006, and Southsea, abolished in 2010.

== Governance ==
Every civil parish has a parish meeting, which all the electors of the parish are entitled to attend. Generally a meeting is held once a year. A civil parish may have a parish council which exercises various local responsibilities prescribed by statute. Parishes with fewer than 200 electors are usually deemed too small to have a parish council, and instead will only have a parish meeting: an example of direct democracy. Alternatively several small parishes can be grouped together and share a common parish council, or even a common parish meeting.

A parish council may decide to call itself a town council, village council, community council, neighbourhood council, or if the parish has city status, the parish council may call itself a city council. According to the Department for Communities and Local Government, in England in 2011 there were 9,946 parishes. Since 1997 around 100 new civil parishes have been created, in some cases by splitting existing civil parishes, but mostly by creating new ones from unparished areas.

=== Powers and functions ===
Parish or town councils have very few statutory duties but have a range of discretionary powers which they may exercise voluntarily. These powers have been defined by various pieces of legislation. Their role varies depending on the size, resources, and ability of the council.

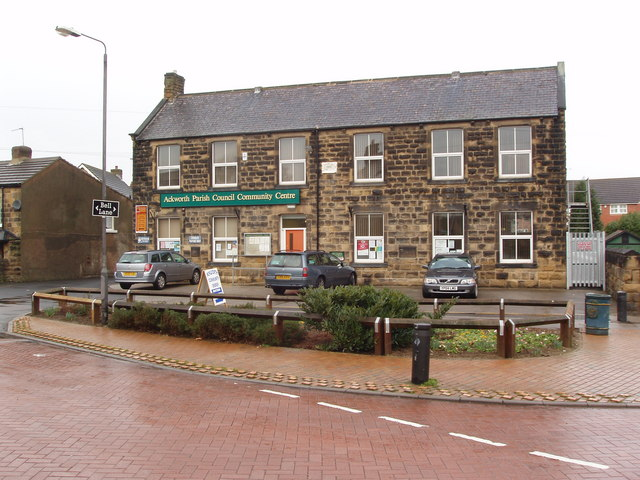
Parish council community centre, in Ackworth, West Yorkshire

Parish councils have powers to provide and manage various local facilities; these can include allotments, cemeteries, parks, playgrounds, community centres, bus shelters, street lighting, roadside verges, car parks, footpaths, litter bins, and war memorials. Larger parish councils may also be involved in running markets, public toilets and public clocks, museums, and leisure centres.

Parish councils may spend money on various things they deem to be beneficial to their communities, such as providing grants to local community groups or local projects, or fund things such as public events, crime prevention measures, community transport schemes, traffic calming, or tourism promotion.

Parish councils have a role in the planning system; they have a statutory right to be consulted on any planning applications in their areas. They may also produce a neighbourhood plan to influence local development.

The Localism Act 2011 allowed eligible parish councils to be granted a "general power of competence" which allows them within certain limits the freedom to do anything an individual can do provided it is not prohibited by other legislation, as opposed to being limited to the powers explicitly granted to them by law. To be eligible for this, a parish council must meet certain conditions such as having a clerk with suitable qualifications.

=== Funding ===
Parish councils receive funding by levying a "precept" on the council tax paid by the residents of the parish (or parishes) served by the parish council. In a civil parish which has no parish council, the parish meeting may levy a council tax precept for expenditure relating to specific functions, powers and rights which have been conferred on it by legislation. In places where there is no civil parish (unparished areas), the administration of the activities normally undertaken by the parish becomes the responsibility of the district or borough council. The district council may make an additional council tax charge, known as a Special Expense, to residents of the unparished area to fund those activities. If the district council does not opt to make a Special Expenses charge, there is an element of double taxation of residents of parished areas, because services provided to residents of the unparished area are funded by council tax paid by residents of the whole district, rather than only by residents of the unparished area.

=== Councillors and elections ===
Parish councils comprise volunteer councillors who are elected to serve for four years. Decisions of the council are carried out by a paid officer, typically known as a parish clerk. Councils may employ additional people (including bodies corporate, provided where necessary, by tender) to carry out specific tasks dictated by the council. Some councils have chosen to pay their elected members an allowance, as permitted under part 5 of the Local Authorities (Members' Allowances) (England) Regulations 2003.

The number of councillors varies roughly in proportion to the population of the parish. Most rural parish councillors are elected to represent the entire parish, though in parishes with larger populations or those that cover larger areas, the parish can be divided into wards. Each of these wards then returns councillors to the parish council (the numbers depending on their population). Only if there are more candidates standing for election than there are seats on the council will an election be held. However, sometimes there are fewer candidates than seats. When this happens, the vacant seats have to be filled by co-option by the council. If a vacancy arises for a seat mid-term, an election is only held if a certain number (usually ten) of parish residents request an election. Otherwise the council will co-opt someone to be the replacement councillor.

The Localism Act 2011 introduced new arrangements which replaced the 'Standards Board regime' with local monitoring by district, unitary or equivalent authorities. Under new regulations which came into effect in 2012 all parish councils in England are required to adopt a code of conduct with which parish councillors must comply, and to promote and maintain high standards. A new criminal offence of failing to comply with statutory requirements was introduced. More than one 'model code' has been published, and councils are free to modify an existing code or adopt a new code. In either case the code must comply with the Nolan Principles of Public Life.

=== Status and styles ===
A parish can be granted city status by the Crown. As of 2020, eight parishes in England have city status, each having a long-established Anglican cathedral: Chichester, Ely, Hereford, Lichfield, Ripon, Salisbury, Truro and Wells.

The council of an ungrouped parish may pass a resolution giving the parish the status of a town, at which point the council becomes a town council. Around 400 parish councils are called town councils.

Under the Local Government and Public Involvement in Health Act 2007, a civil parish may be given one of the following alternative styles:

- community
- neighbourhood
- village

As a result, a parish council can be called a town council, a community council, a neighbourhood council, a village council or occasionally a city council (though most cities are not parishes but principal areas, or in England specifically metropolitan boroughs or non-metropolitan districts).

The chairman of a town council will have the title "town mayor" and that of a parish council which is a city will usually have the title of mayor.

=== Charter trustees ===
When a city or town has been abolished as a borough, and it is considered desirable to maintain continuity of the charter, the charter may be transferred to a parish council for its area. Where there is no such parish council, the district council may appoint charter trustees to whom the charter and the arms of the former borough will belong. The charter trustees (who consist of the councillor or councillors for the area of the former borough) maintain traditions such as mayoralty. An example of such a city was Hereford, whose city council was merged in 1998 to form a unitary Herefordshire. The area of the city of Hereford remained unparished until 2000 when a parish council was created for the city. As another example, the charter trustees for the City of Bath make up the majority of the councillors on Bath and North East Somerset Council.

== Geography ==
Civil parishes cover 35% of England's population, with one in Greater London and few in the other conurbations. Civil parishes vary greatly in population: some have populations below 100 and have no settlement larger than a hamlet, while others cover towns with populations of tens of thousands. Weston-super-Mare, with a population of 82,225 as of the 2021 census, is the most populous civil parish. In many cases small settlements, today popularly termed villages, localities or suburbs, are in a single parish which originally had one church.

Large urban areas are mostly unparished, as the government at the time of the Local Government Act 1972 discouraged their creation for large towns or their suburbs, but there is generally nothing to stop their establishment. For example, Birmingham has two parishes (New Frankley and Sutton Coldfield), Oxford has four, and the Milton Keynes urban area has 24. Parishes could not however be established in London until the law was changed in 2007.

A civil parish can range in area from a small village or town ward to a large tract of mostly uninhabited moorland in the Cheviots, Pennines or Dartmoor. The two largest as at December 2023 are Stanhope (County Durham) at 98.6 square miles (255 km^{2}), and Dartmoor Forest (Devon) at 79.07 square miles (204.8 km^{2}). The two smallest are parcels of shared rural land: Lands Common to Axminster and Kilmington (Devon) at 0.012 square miles (0.031 km^{2}; 3.1 ha; 7.7 acres), and Lands Common to Brancepeth and Brandon and Byshottles (County Durham) at 0.0165 square miles (0.043 km^{2}; 4.3 ha; 10.6 acres). The next two smallest are parishes in built up areas: Chester Castle (Cheshire) at 0.0168 square miles (0.044 km^{2}; 4.4 ha; 10.8 acres) (no recorded population) and Hamilton Lea (Leicestershire) at 0.07 square miles (0.18 km^{2}; 18 ha; 45 acres) (1,021 residents at the 2021 census).

=== Deserted parishes ===
The 2001 census recorded several parishes with no inhabitants. These were Chester Castle (in Chester city centre), Newland with Woodhouse Moor, Beaumont Chase, Martinsthorpe, Meering, Stanground North (subsequently abolished), Sturston, Tottington, and Tyneham (subsequently merged). The lands of the last three were taken over by the Armed Forces during World War II and remain deserted.

In the 2011 census, Newland with Woodhouse Moor and Beaumont Chase reported inhabitants, and there were no new deserted parishes recorded.

=== General abolition of anomalies ===
Nearly all instances of detached parts of civil parishes (areas not contiguous with the main part of the parish) and of those straddling counties have been ended. 14 examples remain in England as at 2022, including Barnby Moor and Wallingwells, both in Nottinghamshire.

Direct predecessors of civil parishes are most often known as "ancient parishes", although many date only from the mid 19th century. Using a longer historical lens the better terms are "pre-separation (civil and ecclesiastical) parish", "original medieval parishes" and "new parishes". The Victoria County History, a landmark collaborative work mostly written in the 20th century (although incomplete), summarises the history of each English "parish", roughly meaning late medieval parish. A minority of these had exclaves, which could be:

- an enclave within another parish,
- surrounded by more than one other parish, or
- a pene-enclave, partly surrounded by sea.

In some cases an exclave of a parish (a "detached part") was in a different county. In other cases, counties surrounded a whole parish meaning it was in an unconnected, "alien" county. These anomalies resulted in a highly localised difference in applicable representatives on the national level, justices of the peace, sheriffs, bailiffs with inconvenience to the inhabitants. If a parish was split then churchwardens, highway wardens and constables would also spend more time or money travelling large distances. Some parishes straddled two or more counties, such as Todmorden in Lancashire and Yorkshire.

Such anomalies mostly arose in the height of the feudal system, when parishes evolved. Major land interests (manor proper or church lands) may have acquired non-contiguous parcels of land i.e. beyond the original parish/county bounds or what would become the boundaries of a new parish. Those extraterritorial land parcels influenced the formation of parish boundaries where the parcels were significant to the parish. Thus secular land in an exclave, almost always manor, may have been the site of a prosperous farmstead, or remained part of the manor for generations, or the lord/lady of the manor may have held the right to appoint the parish priest (advowson) or co-founded the church as its patron. The scenario may also have arisen originally as an attempt to diversify the lord's (or overlord's) interests, or from a large burial ground in an urban setting. It could also arise from a chance inheritance. It caused inconvenience to the residents of most exclaves/enclaves (where not numerous or economically significant enough to have their own chapel of ease as to religious matters and a vestry as to civil matters). They had to attend a distant church and/or the manorial court for certain tithes, rates, baptisms, marriages, funerals, or to obtain regular poor relief and most forms of education, charitable alms and hospitalry.

The end of manorial courts coincided with growing agricultural innovation, fragmentation of land ownership and housing growth. The church and vestries were reluctant to bring boundaries up to date. This meant such anomalies were irrelevant nuisances with a real economic cost in distance of administration and confusion. They began to be remedied nationally in statute by Parliament in the early 19th century in the Poor Law Reforms of 1834, and was more widely in 1844 when the Counties (Detached Parts) Act 1844 moved most parishes which were partly or wholly in an alien county. The remaining exclaves of counties were transferred in the 1890s and in 1931, with one exception: an exclave of Tetworth, surrounded by Cambridgeshire, was removed in 1965 from Huntingdonshire.

Other acts, including the Divided Parishes and Poor Law Amendment Act 1882 eliminated instances of civil parishes being split between counties, so that by 1901 Stanground in Huntingdonshire and the Isle of Ely was the last example; it was split into two parishes, one in each county, in 1905.

The Church of England has only abolished these where locally incepted (under the Anglican and the Catholic principle of subsidiarity). This means it has essentially kept, often divided in urban areas, the original parishes. The Church's main website has an accessible map, showing parish boundaries church-by-church.

Eight exclaves of highly anomalous Cowley, all in Hillingdon, then in Middlesex

The two tiny exclaves of Enfield

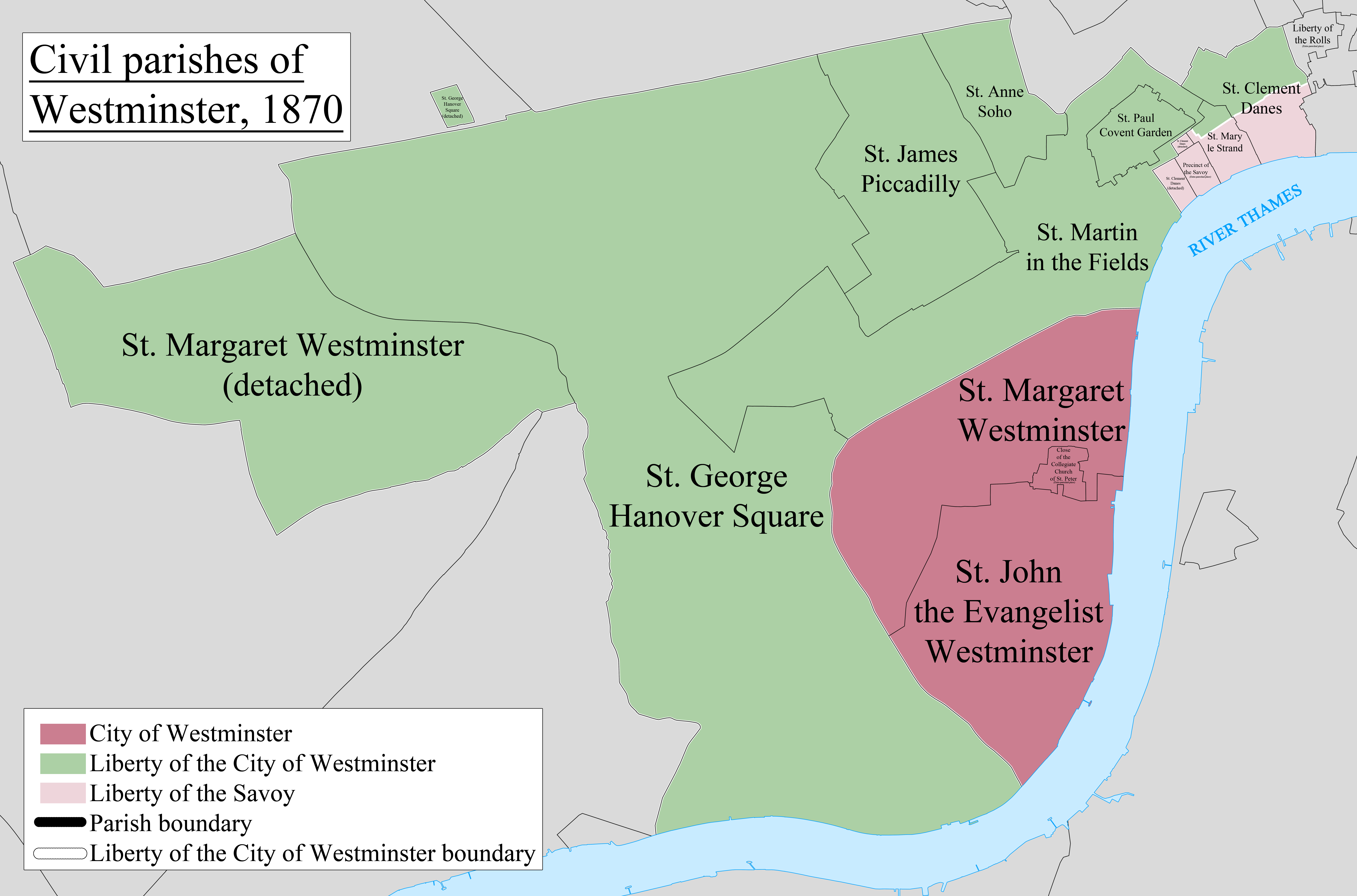
Burial exclave of the 1724 which created St George Hanover Square in Paddington. It remains only in the C of E. Used for burials 1763–1852.

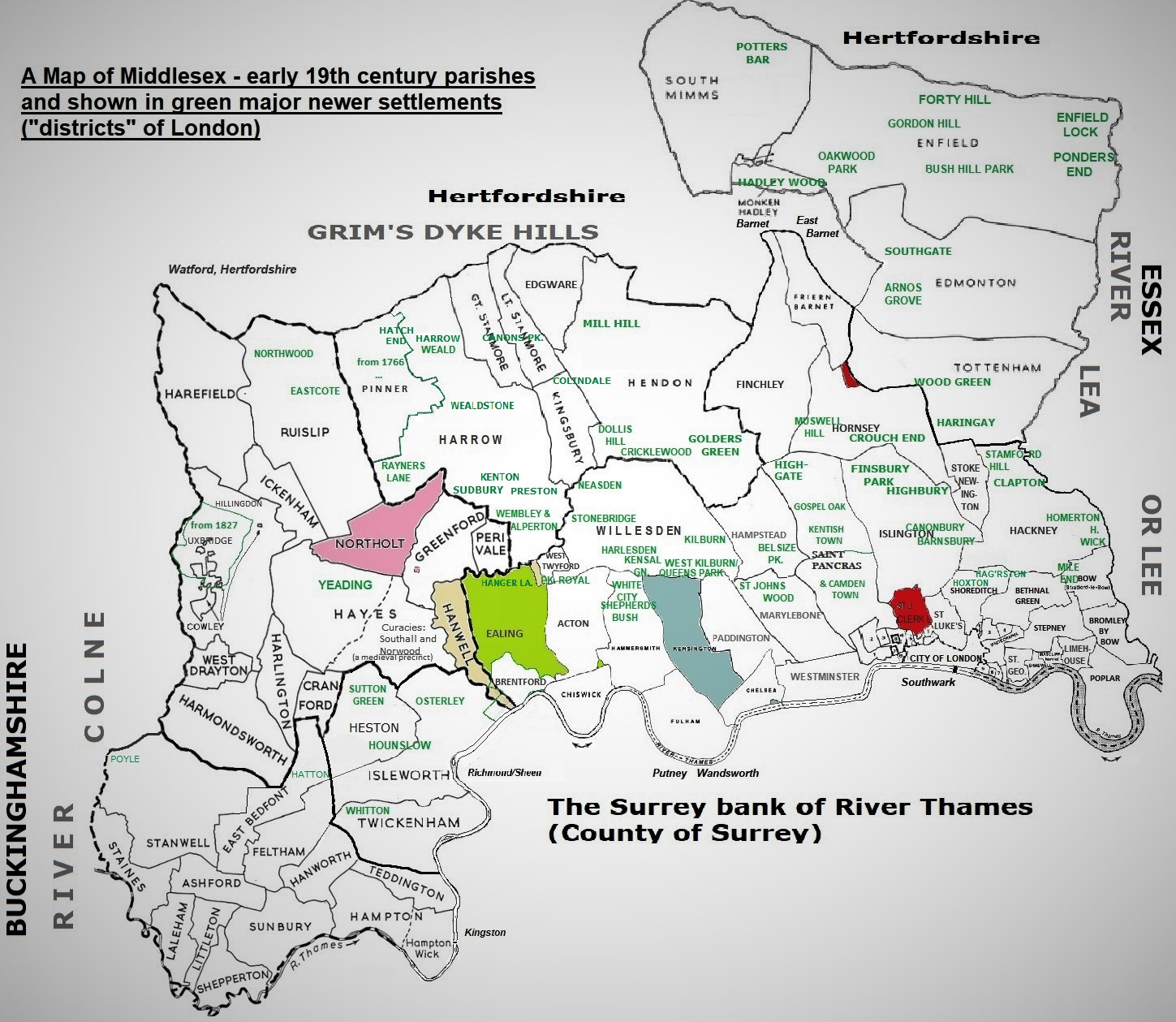
Map of the other main enclaves and exclaves in Middlesex

== See also ==
- List of civil parishes in England

=== Similar units found in other countries ===
- Comune of Italy
- Communes of France
- Parroquia in the Spanish autonomous communities of Galicia and Asturias
- Freguesia in Portugal
- New England town
- Municipalities of Spain
- Municipalities of the Netherlands
- Municipalities of Germany
- Civil parishes of Ireland
