= 2027 Newark and Sherwood District Council election =

2027 English local government election

- 6 May 2026

All 39 seats to Newark and Sherwood District Council 20 seats needed for a majority

	First party	Second party	Third party
Leader	Jack Kellas	Paul Peacock	Peter Harris
Party	Conservative	Labour	Liberal Democrats
Leader's seat	Farndon & Fernwood	Edwinstowe & Clipstone	Southwell
Last election	14	11	3
Seats before	12	11	3
	Fourth party	Fifth party
Leader	Kay Smith
Party	Reform	Green
Leader's seat	Balderton North & Coddington
Last election	0	0
Seats before	2	1
Leader before election
Jack Kellas
Labour
No overall control
Leader after election
TBD

The 2027 Newark and Sherwood Council election will take place on 6 May 2027, to elect all 39 members of Newark and Sherwood District Council in England. This will be on the same day as other local elections held across the United Kingdom.

== Background ==
Newark and Sherwood is one of the seven non-metropolitan districts that make up Nottinghamshire County Council. Both Labour and the Conservatives formed administrations on the council, though the Conservatives have seen greater success at recent elections, winning majorities in 2007, 2015, and 2019. The 2023 election saw the council return to no overall control, with the Conservatives winning 14 seats, Labour winning 11, independents winning 11, and the Liberal Democrats winning 3. Labour formed an administration for the first time since 1995 with the support of independents and the Liberal Democrats.

=== Local government reorganisation ===
Newark and Sherwood is one of the districts planned to be abolished as part of upcoming structural changes to local government in England. The district is expected to form part of the Nottinghamshire unitary authority.

Initial plans for the reorganisation scheduled elections for the unitary authorities in May 2027 which entailed Newark and Sherwood's election being cancelled. Following the receipt of legal advice the Ministry of Housing, Communities and Local Government confirmed that the 2027 elections would take place on current local government boundaries.

== Previous council composition ==
After 2023 election		Before 2027 election	
Party	Seats	Party	Seats
Conservative	14	Conservative	12
Labour	11	Labour	11
Liberal Democrats	3	Liberal Democrats	3
Reform	0	Reform	2
Green	0	Reform	1
Independent	11	Independent	10 (Note: Three groupings of independents exist on the council. Simon Forde, Jean Hall, David Moore, and Neil Ross sit in the Independents for Newark and District group. Debbie Darby and Tina Thompson sit in the Newark and Sherwood District Independents group. Irene Brown, Susan Crosby, Rhona Holloway, and Johno Lee sit as non-aligned independents.)

Changes 2023 — 2027:

- August 2024: Emma Oldham (Independent) and Matthew Spoors (Labour) join Green Party
- November 2024: Linda Dales (Conservative) and Rhona Holloway (Conservative) leave party to sit as independents
- January 2025: Johno Lee (Conservative) leaves party to sit as an independent
- May 2025: Linda Dales (Independent) re-joins Conservatives
- September 2025: Emma Oldham (Green) and Adrian Amer (Independent) resign — by-elections held November 2025
- November 2025: Michelle Home (Reform) and Kay Smith (Reform) gain by-elections
- March 2026: Rowan Cozens (Independent) joins Labour
- July 2026: Roger Jackson (Conservative) dies — by-election held October 2026
- October 2026: Scott Carlton (Conservative) wins by-election
