= Newark and Sherwood District Council elections =

Local government elections in Nottinghamshire, England

Newark and Sherwood District Council elections are held every four years. Newark and Sherwood District Council is the local authority for the non-metropolitan district of Newark and Sherwood in Nottinghamshire, England. Since the last boundary changes in 2015, 39 councillors have been elected from 21 wards.

== Council elections ==
- 1973 Newark District Council election
- 1976 Newark District Council election
- 1979 Newark District Council election (New ward boundaries)
- 1983 Newark District Council election
- 1987 Newark District Council election (Some new ward boundaries & district boundary changes also took place)
- 1991 Newark District Council election (District boundary changes took place but the number of seats remained the same)
- 1995 Newark District Council election
- 1999 Newark and Sherwood District Council election
- 2003 Newark and Sherwood District Council election (New ward boundaries reduced the number of seats by 8)
- 2007 Newark and Sherwood District Council election (New ward boundaries)
- 2011 Newark and Sherwood District Council election
- 2015 Newark and Sherwood District Council election (New ward boundaries)
- 2019 Newark and Sherwood District Council election
- 2023 Newark and Sherwood District Council election

== Results maps ==
2003 results map

2007 results map

2011 results map

2015 results map

2019 results map

2023 results map

== By-election results ==
=== 1995-1999 ===
Castle By-Election 7 November 1996
Party	Candidate	Votes	%	±%
Conservative		492	46.3	
Labour		378	35.6	
Liberal Democrats		193	18.1	
Majority		114	10.7	
Turnout		1,063	23.0	
Conservative gain from Labour		Swing		

Southwell West By-Election 17 July 1997
Party	Candidate	Votes	%	±%
Liberal Democrats		550	60.0	−3.4
Conservative		294	32.1	+11.4
Labour		73	8.0	−7.9
Majority		256	27.9	
Turnout		917	36.0	
Liberal Democrats hold		Swing		

Bilsthorpe By-Election 25 September 1997
Party	Candidate	Votes	%	±%
Labour		unopposed		
Labour hold		Swing		

Edwinstowe By-Election 25 September 1997
Party	Candidate	Votes	%	±%
Independent		609	54.7	
Labour		505	45.3	
Majority		104	9.4	
Turnout		1,114		
Independent gain from Labour		Swing		

Bilsthorpe By-Election 23 April 1998
Party	Candidate	Votes	%	±%
Labour		unopposed		
Labour hold		Swing		

Winthorpe By-Election 11 June 1998
Party	Candidate	Votes	%	±%
Conservative		394	72.6	+31.7
Labour		116	21.4	−23.4
Independent Labour		33	6.1	+6.1
Majority		278	51.2	
Turnout		543	29.9	
Conservative gain from Labour		Swing		

=== 1999-2003 ===
Farnsfield By-Election 14 September 2000
Party	Candidate	Votes	%	±%
Conservative		672	65.1	
Labour		210	20.3	
Liberal Democrats		150	14.5	
Majority		462	44.8	
Turnout		1,032	31.0	
Conservative gain from Independent		Swing		

Bridge By-Election 24 January 2002
Party	Candidate	Votes	%	±%
Independent		599	71.2	+40.2
Labour		242	28.8	−0.8
Majority		357	42.4	
Turnout		841	18.5	
Independent gain from Labour		Swing		

=== 2003-2007 ===
Clipstone By-Election 11 September 2003
Party	Candidate	Votes	%	±%
Labour	David Thompson	361	50.3	+16.0
Independent	William Giles	272	37.9	−6.5
Conservative	Carol Hewson	84	11.7	+11.7
Majority		89	12.4	
Turnout		717	24.9	
Labour hold		Swing		

Collingham and Meering By-Election 18 September 2003
Party	Candidate	Votes	%	±%
Conservative	Kevin Rontree	744	67.0	+5.1
Liberal Democrats	Declan Logue	213	19.2	−2.8
Labour	Matt Stevenson-Dodd	154	13.9	−2.2
Majority		531	47.8	
Turnout		1,111	29.7	
Conservative hold		Swing		

Southwell East By-Election 3 March 2005
Party	Candidate	Votes	%	±%
Liberal Democrats	Eileen Rodgers	376	52.7	−8.7
Conservative		338	47.3	+8.7
Majority		38	5.4	
Turnout		714	42.9	
Liberal Democrats hold		Swing		

Balderton West By-Election 14 July 2005
Party	Candidate	Votes	%	±%
Conservative	Betty Brooks	271	58.7	+8.2
Labour	Janet Weinbren	103	22.3	−12.0
Independent	Anne Trout	88	19.0	+19.0
Majority		168	36.4	
Turnout		462		
Conservative hold		Swing		

Ollerton By-Election 19 January 2006
Party	Candidate	Votes	%	±%
Labour	Russell Snood	unopposed		
Labour hold		Swing		

=== 2007-2011 ===
Edwinstowe By-Election 5 June 2008
Party	Candidate	Votes	%	±%
Independent	Shirley Moore	715	60.9	+6.8
Labour	John Benson	459	39.1	+8.9
Majority		256	21.8	
Turnout		1,174	28.9	
Independent hold		Swing		

Magnus By-Election 24 July 2008
Party	Candidate	Votes	%	±%
Conservative	Maxwell Cope	310	49.8	−17.1
Independent	Helen Gent	173	27.8	+27.8
Liberal Democrats	Antony Barson	140	22.5	+22.5
Majority		137	22.0	
Turnout		623	16.3	
Conservative hold		Swing		

Clipstone By-Election 11 December 2008
Party	Candidate	Votes	%	±%
Labour	Sheila Soar	326	43.4	+7.3
Liberal Democrats	Christopher Orton	216	28.8	+28.8
Independent	Lynn Buttery	157	20.9	−22.3
Conservative	Stefan Prest	52	6.9	−13.8
Majority		110	14.6	
Turnout		751	22.9	
Labour gain from Independent		Swing		

Beacon By-Election 17 September 2009
Party	Candidate	Votes	%	±%
Conservative	Simon Dawson	413	48.2	−0.7
Liberal Democrats	Declan Logue	296	34.7	+7.8
Labour	Douglas Hough	147	17.2	−7.1
Majority		117	13.5	
Turnout		856	16.6	
Conservative hold		Swing		

Rainworth By-Election 1 July 2010
Party	Candidate	Votes	%	±%
Labour	Linda Tift	735	66.9	+33.0
Conservative	Mike Warner	219	19.9	−6.6
Independent	Alan Armin	144	13.1	+13.1
Majority		516	47.0	
Turnout		1,098		
Labour hold		Swing		

=== 2011-2015 ===
Lowdham By-Election 12 April 2012
Party	Candidate	Votes	%	±%
Conservative	Tim Wendels	787	51.5	N/A
Liberal Democrats	William Davison	534	34.9	N/A
Labour	Daniel Hibberd	117	7.7	N/A
Independent	Tim Cutler	91	6.0	N/A
Majority		253	16.5	
Turnout		1,529		
Conservative hold		Swing		

Collingham and Meering By-Election 2 May 2013
Party	Candidate	Votes	%	±%
Conservative	Derek Evans	1,112	75.0	+9.6
Labour	Daniel Hibberd	370	25.0	+25.0
Majority		742	50.0	
Turnout		1,482		
Conservative hold		Swing		

Farnsfield and Bilsthorpe By-Election 27 June 2013
Party	Candidate	Votes	%	±%
Conservative	Frank Taylor	1,174	63.3	+4.6
Labour	Glenn Bardill	682	36.7	−4.6
Majority		492	26.5	
Turnout		1,856		
Conservative hold		Swing		

Collingham and Meering By-Election 11 September 2014
Party	Candidate	Votes	%	±%
Conservative	Richard Shillito	568	41.2	−33.8
Independent	David Clarke	476	34.5	+34.5
UKIP	Sara Chadd	218	15.8	+15.8
Labour	Kieran Owen	118	8.6	−16.4
Majority		92	6.7	
Turnout		1,380		
Conservative hold		Swing		

Ollerton By-Election 11 September 2014
Party	Candidate	Votes	%	±%
Labour	Michael Pringle	837	58.1	+7.5
Conservative	Mary Brown	323	22.4	−4.6
UKIP	Moritz Dawkins	280	19.4	+19.4
Majority		514	35.7	
Turnout		1,440		
Labour hold		Swing		

=== 2015-2019 ===
Balderton South By-Election 21 July 2016
Party	Candidate	Votes	%	±%
Conservative	Lydia Hurst	483	82.4	+25.4
Liberal Democrats	Marylyn Rayner	103	17.6	+17.6
Majority		380	64.9	
Turnout		586		
Conservative hold		Swing		

Ollerton By-Election 4 May 2017
Party	Candidate	Votes	%	±%
Labour	Neal Mitchell	1,469	61.7	−3.3
Conservative	Glenn Bardill	913	38.3	+3.3
Majority		556	23.3	
Turnout		2,382		
Labour hold		Swing		

=== 2019-2023 ===
Boughton By-Election 6 May 2021
Party	Candidate	Votes	%	±%
Conservative	Tim Wildgust	542	61.2	+8.8
Labour	Derek Batey	283	32.0	−15.6
Independent	Jeremy Spry	60	6.8	+6.8
Majority		259	29.3	
Turnout		885		
Conservative hold		Swing		

Bridge By-Election 1 July 2021 (2)
Party	Candidate	Votes	%	±%
Conservative	Jack Kellas	310		
Conservative	Simon Haynes	267		
Independent	Ryan Bickerton	236		
Independent	Deb's Darby	181		
Labour	Lisa Geary	177		
Labour	Mark Palmer	162		
Liberal Democrats	Ryan Cullen	104		
Green	Steve Platt	81		
Liberal Democrats	Keith Melton	59		
Green	Mike Poyzer	57		
Conservative gain from Independent		Swing		
Conservative gain from Independent		Swing		

Rainworth South and Blidworth By-Election 21 October 2021
Party	Candidate	Votes	%	±%
Independent	Tina Thompson	650	66.2	+66.2
Conservative	Sheila Jackson	168	17.1	−12.9
Labour	Callum Walsh	164	16.7	−22.9
Majority		482	49.1	
Turnout		982		
Independent gain from Labour		Swing		

Collingham By-Election 17 February 2022
Party	Candidate	Votes	%	±%
Conservative	Emma Davis	982	56.3	+26.5
Liberal Democrats	Phil Barron	594	34.1	+18.8
Labour	Matthew Spoors	168	9.6	+9.6
Majority		388	22.2	
Turnout		1,744		
Conservative gain from Independent		Swing		

Ollerton By-Election 30 June 2022
Party	Candidate	Votes	%	±%
Labour	Mike Pringle	962	64.9	+0.6
Conservative	Kelly Fordham	395	26.7	−9.0
Independent	Jeremy Spry	125	8.4	+8.4
Majority		567	38.3	
Turnout		1,482		
Labour hold		Swing		

Edwinstowe and Clipstone By-Election 29 September 2022
Party	Candidate	Votes	%	±%
Labour	Andrew Freeman	804	59.8	+10.0
Conservative	Nigel Booth	540	40.2	−10.0
Majority		264	19.6	
Turnout		1,344		
Labour gain from Conservative		Swing		

=== 2023-2027 ===
Balderton North and Coddington By-Election 6 November 2025
Party	Candidate	Votes	%	±%
Reform	Kay Smith	545	42.0	
Conservative	Janette Barlow	480	37.0	
Green	Martin Lunn	173	13.3	
Labour	Tracey Jevons-Hazzard	101	7.8	
Majority		65	5.0	
Turnout		1,299		
Reform gain from Independent		Swing		

Castle By-Election 6 November 2025
Party	Candidate	Votes	%	±%
Reform	Michelle Home	204	29.0	
Conservative	Mathew Skinner	193	27.4	
Labour	Lisa Geary	88	12.5	
Independent	Jane Harrison	74	10.5	
Liberal Democrats	Alla Musson	70	9.9	
Green	Bee Newboult	61	8.7	
Independent	Glenis Rix	14	2.0	
Majority		11	1.6	
Turnout		704		
Reform gain from Independent		Swing		

Dover Beck By-Election 29 October 2026
Party	Candidate	Votes	%	±%
Conservative	Scott Carlton	409	41.7	
Reform	John Hart	328	33.5	
Labour	Kevin Scoles	148	15.1	
Liberal Democrats	Stephen Andersen	73	8.7	
Green	Lucy Spoors	22	2.2	
Majority		81	8.3	
Turnout		980		
Conservative hold		Swing		
