= Municipal Borough of Newark =

Former local government area in the UK

Newark
- Municipal Borough of Newark shown within Nottinghamshire in 1970.
- Area
  - 1911: 1,931 acres (7.81 km^{2})
  - 1961: 3,364 acres (13.61 km^{2})
- Population
  - 1911: 16,408
  - 1961: 24,651
- History
  - Created: 1835
  - Abolished: 1974
  - Succeeded by: Newark and Sherwood
- Status: Municipal Borough
- Government: Newark Borough Council
  - HQ: Newark

Newark was a Municipal Borough in Nottinghamshire, England from 1835 to 1974. It was created under the Municipal Corporations Act 1835.

The borough was abolished in 1974 under the Local Government Act 1972 and combined with Newark Rural District and Southwell Rural District to form the new Newark and Sherwood district.
