= Newark Rural District =

Former rural district in Nottinghamshire, England

Coordinates: 53.12°N 0.77°W

- Newark Rural District shown within Nottinghamshire in 1970.
- History
  - Created: 1894
  - Abolished: 1974
  - Succeeded by: Newark and Sherwood
- Status: Rural district
  - HQ: Newark-on-Trent

Newark was a rural district in Nottinghamshire, England from 1894 to 1974.

It was formed by the Local Government Act 1894 from the Newark rural sanitary district. The district was long and thin, being far longer from the far north to the far south than it was widthwise, as much of the Newark RSD had been in Lincolnshire, and went to form the Claypole Rural District.

The district was amended slightly in 1935 under a County Review Order, losing some area to Newark, but taking some parishes from Southwell Rural District.

In 1974 it was abolished under the Local Government Act 1972, becoming part of a Newark and Sherwood district along with Southwell RD and the Newark borough.
