= Southwell Rural District =

Former local government area in the UK

Coordinates: 53.1°N 0.95°W

- Southwell Rural District shown within Nottinghamshire in 1970.
- History
  - Created: 1894
  - Abolished: 1974
  - Succeeded by: Newark and Sherwood
- Status: Rural District
  - HQ: Southwell

Southwell was a rural district in Nottinghamshire, England from 1894 to 1974.

It was created by the Local Government Act 1894 as a successor to the Southwell rural sanitary district.

It was amended in 1935 under a County Review Order by ceding a few parishes to the Newark Rural District and taking in a few from the disbanded Skegby Rural District.

It was abolished in 1974 under the Local Government Act 1972, and was combined with the area of the Newark RD, and Newark borough to form the district of Newark and Sherwood.
