= 2019 Newark and Sherwood District Council election =

2019 UK local government election

- 2 May 2019

All 39 seats to Newark and Sherwood District Council 20 seats needed for a majority
	First party	Second party	Third party
	Con	Lab	Ind
Party	Conservative	Labour	Independent
Last election	24 seats	12 seats	3 seats
Seats won	27 seats	7 seats	3 seats
Seat change	▲3	▼5	Steady
- Map of the results
Party before election
Conservative
Elected Party
Conservative

The 2019 Newark and Sherwood District Council election took place on 2 May 2019 to elect all 39 members of Newark and Sherwood District Council in Nottinghamshire, England. This took place as part of the 2019 local elections.

== Result ==
The election resulted in the Conservative Party retaining its control of the council, with an increased majority.

Newark and Sherwood District Council election, 2019
Party	Seats	Gains	Losses	Net gain/loss	Seats %	Votes %	Votes	+/−
Conservative	27	6	3	▲3		47.6	26,141	
Labour	7	1	6	▼5		26.7	14,651	
Independent	3			Steady		7.9	4,360	
Liberal Democrats	2	2		▲2		12.7	6,986	
Green	0			Steady		3.2	1,737	
UKIP	0			Steady		1.8	1,013	

== Ward Results ==
=== Balderton North and Coddington ===
Balderton North and Coddington
Party	Candidate	Votes	%	±%
Conservative	Johno Lee	900	51.9	
Conservative	Betty Brooks	866	49.9	
Independent	Amanda Thompson	351	20.2	
UKIP	Michael Patchett	325	18.7	
Labour	Debbie Antcliff	289	16.7	
Liberal Democrats	Anita Prabhakar	204	11.8	
Turnout		1,747		
Conservative hold				
Conservative hold				

=== Balderton South ===
Balderton South
Party	Candidate	Votes	%	±%
Conservative	Lydia Hurst	640	67.9	
Conservative	Ronnie White	569	60.3	
Labour	Maxine Leigh	271	28.7	
Labour	Jeremy Taylor	262	27.8	
Turnout		997		
Conservative hold				
Conservative hold				

=== Beacon ===
Beacon
Party	Candidate	Votes	%	±%
Conservative	Rita Crowe	895	42.8	
Conservative	David Lloyd	879	42.0	
Conservative	Mathew Skinner	838	40.0	
Green	Esther Cropper	630	30.1	
Labour	Naz Butt	617	29.5	
Labour	Peter Brooks	532	25.4	
Green	Jay Henderson	496	23.7	
Labour	Andrew Freeman	466	22.3	
Liberal Democrats	Jeffrey Thorpe	317	15.1	
Turnout		2,137		
Conservative hold				
Conservative hold				
Conservative hold				

=== Bilsthorpe ===
Bilsthorpe
Party	Candidate	Votes	%	±%
Conservative	Rhona Holloway	526	62.0	
Labour	Adam Murphy	323	38.0	
Turnout		899		
Conservative gain from Labour				

=== Boughton ===
Boughton
Party	Candidate	Votes	%	±%
Conservative	Brendan Clarke-Smith	414	52.4	
Labour	Paula Hancock	376	47.6	
Turnout		826		
Conservative gain from Labour				

=== Bridge ===
Bridge
Party	Candidate	Votes	%	±%
Independent	Gill Dawn	671	57.4	
Independent	Irene Brown	647	55.3	
Labour	Kevin Parnham	300	25.6	
Conservative	Roy Williams	269	23.0	
Conservative	Ian Harrison	230	19.7	
Turnout		1,193		
Independent hold				
Independent hold				

=== Castle ===
Castle
Party	Candidate	Votes	%	±%
Conservative	Keith Girling	323	42.6	
Labour	James Baggaley	230	30.3	
Independent	Richard Belam	125	16.5	
Liberal Democrats	Chris Adams	81	10.7	
Turnout		771		
Conservative hold				

=== Collingham ===
Collingham
Party	Candidate	Votes	%	±%
Independent	Maureen Dobson	1,419	78.3	
Conservative	Linda Dales	771	42.5	
Liberal Democrats	Marylyn Rayner	395	21.8	
Turnout		1,835		
Independent hold				
Conservative hold				

=== Devon ===
Devon
Party	Candidate	Votes	%	±%
Conservative	Max Cope	686	38.3	
Conservative	Bob Crowe	672	37.5	
Labour	Laurence Goff	617	34.4	
Labour	Dennis Jones	547	30.5	
Conservative	Simon Haynes	545	30.4	
Labour	Ruth Woodhall	534	29.8	
Independent	Tracy Mathias	468	26.1	
Green	Lucy Pegler	434	24.2	
Turnout		1,822		
Conservative hold				
Conservative hold				
Labour gain from Conservative				

=== Dover Beck ===
Dover Beck
Party	Candidate	Votes	%	±%
Conservative	Roger Jackson	716	76.8	
Labour	Craig Pitchford	216	23.2	
Turnout		972		
Conservative hold		Swing		

=== Edwinstowe and Clipstone ===
Edwinstowe and Clipstone
Party	Candidate	Votes	%	±%
Conservative	Scott Carlton	989	45.1	
Labour	Paul Peacock	983	44.9	
Conservative	Michael Brown	969	44.2	
Conservative	Gina Aldridge	949	43.3	
Labour	Celia Brooks	946	43.2	
Labour	Karl Beresford	931	42.5	
Turnout		2,281		
Conservative gain from Labour				
Labour hold				
Conservative gain from Labour				

=== Farndon and Fernwood ===
Farndon and Fernwood
Party	Candidate	Votes	%	±%
Conservative	Ivor Walker	879	54.1	
Conservative	Keith Walker	805	49.5	
Conservative	Neill Mison	780	48.0	
Liberal Democrats	Moira Walter	506	31.1	
Liberal Democrats	Heather Cullen	443	27.2	
Liberal Democrats	Ryan Cullen	381	23.4	
Labour	Roger Gannaway	313	19.2	
Turnout		1,681		
Conservative hold				
Conservative hold				
Conservative hold				

=== Farnsfield ===
Farnsfield
Party	Candidate	Votes	%	±%
Conservative	Robert Laughton	528	54.3	
Liberal Democrats	Jackie Johnson	260	26.7	
Labour	John Pearson	184	18.9	
Turnout		991		
Conservative hold				

=== Lowdham ===
Lowdham
Party	Candidate	Votes	%	±%
Conservative	Timothy Wendels	545	57.7	
Green	Thomas Platt	177	18.7	
Liberal Democrats	Peter Scorer	112	11.9	
Labour	Christine Gibbon	111	11.7	
Turnout		956		
Conservative hold				

=== Muskham ===
Muskham
Party	Candidate	Votes	%	±%
Conservative	Sue Saddington	707	72.3	
Liberal Democrats	Vivien Scorer	154	15.7	
Labour	Darrell Pointing	117	12.0	
Turnout		1,003		
Conservative hold				

=== Ollerton ===
Ollerton
Party	Candidate	Votes	%	±%
Labour	Lee Brazier	1,133	59.3	
Labour	Donna Cumberlidge	1,043	54.6	
Labour	Neal Mitchell	945	49.5	
Conservative	Hannah Smith	628	32.9	
Conservative	Philip Jones	606	31.7	
Conservative	Fraser McFarland	578	30.2	
Turnout		2,040		
Labour hold				
Labour hold				
Labour hold				

=== Rainworth North and Rufford ===
Rainworth North and Rufford
Party	Candidate	Votes	%	±%
Conservative	Tom Smith	770	56.0	
Conservative	Dr Louis Brailsford	740	53.9	
Labour	Linda Tift	567	41.3	
Labour	Andy Szpuk	453	33.0	
Turnout		1,450		
Conservative gain from Labour				
Conservative gain from Labour				

=== Rainworth South and Blidworth ===
Rainworth South and Blidworth
Party	Candidate	Votes	%	±%
Labour	Yvonne Woodhead	450	39.0	
Labour	Kathleen Arnold	401	34.8	
Independent	John Cheesmond	345	29.9	
Conservative	Mark Wheatley	341	29.6	
Independent	Martin Atherton	334	29.0	
Conservative	Steve Jackson	292	25.3	
Turnout		1,169		
Labour hold				
Labour hold				

=== Southwell ===
Southwell
Party	Candidate	Votes	%	±%
Liberal Democrats	Peter Harris	1,408	46.2	
Conservative	Penny Rainbow	1,384	45.4	
Liberal Democrats	Malcolm Brock	1,208	39.6	
Liberal Democrats	Stuart Thompstone	1,198	39.3	
Conservative	Geoffrey Handley	1,186	38.9	
Conservative	Peter Brooker	1,153	37.8	
Labour	James Dixon	407	13.3	
UKIP	Christopher Brown	267	8.8	
Turnout		3,089		
Liberal Democrats gain from Conservative				
Conservative hold				
Liberal Democrats gain from Conservative				

=== Sutton-on-Trent ===
Sutton-on-Trent
Party	Candidate	Votes	%	±%
Conservative	Sylvia Michael	Unopposed		
Majority				
Turnout				
Conservative hold		Swing		

=== Trent ===
Trent
Party	Candidate	Votes	%	±%
Conservative	Roger Blaney	573	53.3	
Liberal Democrats	Keith Melton	319	29.7	
UKIP	Robert Hall-Palmer	96	8.9	
Labour	Jennie Mann	87	8.1	
Turnout		1,084		
Conservative hold				

== By-elections ==
=== Boughton ===
Boughton by-election, 6 May 2021
Party	Candidate	Votes	%	±%
Conservative	Tim Wildgust	542	61.2	+8.8
Labour	Derek Batey	283	32.0	−15.6
Independent	Jeremy Spry	60	6.8	N/A
Majority		259	29.3	
Turnout		885	37.9	
Conservative hold		Swing	12.2	

The Boughton by-election was triggered by the resignation of Conservative councillor Brendan Clarke-Smith.

=== Bridge ===
Bridge by-election, 1 July 2021 (2 seats)
Party	Candidate	Votes	%	±%
Conservative	Jack Kellas	310	36.0	N/A
Conservative	Simon Haynes	267	31.0	N/A
Independent	Ryan Bickerton	236	27.4	N/A
Independent	Deb's Darby	181	21.0	N/A
Labour	Lisa Geary	177	20.5	N/A
Labour	Mark Palmer	162	18.8	N/A
Liberal Democrats	Ryan Cullen	104	12.1	N/A
Green	Steve Platt	81	9.4	N/A
Liberal Democrats	Keith Melton	59	6.8	N/A
Green	Mike Poyzer	57	6.6	N/A
Majority		31	3.6	
Turnout		862	17.2	
Conservative gain from Independent				
Conservative gain from Independent				

The Bridge by-election was triggered by the resignations of independent councillors Gill Dawn and Irene Brown.

=== Rainworth South & Blidworth ===
Rainworth South & Blidworth by-election, 21 October 2021
Party	Candidate	Votes	%	±%
Independent	Tina Thompson	650	66.2	N/A
Conservative	Sheila Jackson	168	17.1	−12.2
Labour	Callum Walsh	164	16.7	−22.6
Majority		482	49.1	
Turnout		982	22.2	
Independent gain from Labour				

The Rainworth South & Blidworth by-election was triggered by the death of Labour councillor Kathleen Arnold.

=== Collingham ===
Collingham by-election, 17 February 2022
Party	Candidate	Votes	%	±%
Conservative	Emma Davis	982	56.3	+26.5
Liberal Democrats	Phil Barron	594	34.1	+18.8
Labour	Matthew Spoors	168	9.6	N/A
Majority		388	22.2	
Turnout		1,744	37.8	
Conservative gain from Independent				

The Collingham by-election was triggered by the death of independent councillor Maureen Dobson.

=== Ollerton ===
Ollerton by-election, 30 June 2022
Party	Candidate	Votes	%	±%
Labour	Mike Pringle	962	64.9	+1.6
Conservative	Kelly Fordham	395	26.7	−9.0
Independent	Jeremy Spry	125	8.4	N/A
Majority		567	38.3	
Turnout		1,482	20.3	
Labour hold				

The Ollerton by-election was triggered by the resignation of Labour councillor Neal Mitchell.

=== Edwinstowe & Clipstone ===
Edwinstowe & Clipstone by-election, 29 September 2022
Party	Candidate	Votes	%	±%
Labour	Andy Freeman	804	59.8	+10.2
Conservative	Nigel Booth	540	40.2	−10.2
Majority		264	19.6	
Turnout		1,344		
Labour gain from Conservative				

The Edwinstowe & Clipstone by-election was triggered by the death of Conservative councillor Michael Brown.
