= 2023 Newark and Sherwood District Council election =

2023 English local election

- 4 May 2023

All 39 seats to Newark and Sherwood District Council 20 seats needed for a majority
- Turnout: 32.5%

	First party	Second party
Leader	David Lloyd	Paul Peacock
Party	Conservative	Labour
Last election	27 seats, 47.6%	7 seats, 26.7%
Seats before	30	6
Seats after	14	11
Seat change	▼13	▲4
Popular vote	13,008	8,852
Percentage	39.2%	26.7%
Swing	▼8.4 pp	Steady
	Third party	Fourth party
Party	Independent	Liberal Democrats
Last election	3 seats, 7.9%	2 seats, 12.7%
Seats before	1	2
Seats after	11	3
Seat change	▲8	▲1
Popular vote	6,436	3,367
Percentage	19.4%	10.2%
Swing	▲11.5 pp	▼2.5 pp
- Map of the results
Leader before election
David Lloyd
Conservative
Leader after election
Paul Peacock
Labour
No overall control

The 2023 Newark and Sherwood District Council election took place on 4 May 2023, to elect all 39 members of Newark and Sherwood District Council in Nottinghamshire, England. Prior to the election the council had been under Conservative majority control, being led by David Lloyd. Following the results, the Conservatives lost the council to no overall control, and David Lloyd lost his seat. The Labour group leader, Paul Peacock, was appointed leader of the council at the subsequent annual council meeting on 23 May 2023 with support from the Liberal Democrats and many of the independent councillors.

== Overall results ==
The overall results were as follows:

Newark and Sherwood District Council election, 2023
Party	Seats	Gains	Losses	Net gain/loss	Seats %	Votes %	Votes	+/−
Conservative	14	2	15	▼13	35.9	41.5	23,805	-8.4
Labour	11	6	2	▲4	28.2	25.5	14,643	Steady
Independent	11	9	1	▲8	28.2	17.9	10,251	+11.5
Liberal Democrats	3	1	0	▲1	7.7	12.5	7,170	-2.5
Green	0	0	0	Steady	0.0	2.4	1,376	+1.0
Reform	0	0	0	Steady	0.0	0.1	69	N/A
TUSC	0	0	0	Steady	0.0	0.1	40	N/A

== Ward results ==
The results for each ward were as follows, with an asterisk (*) indicating an incumbent councillor standing for re-election.

=== Balderton North and Coddington ===
Balderton North and Coddington (2 seats)
Party	Candidate	Votes	%	±%
Conservative	Johno Lee*	809	45.3	−6.6
Independent	Emma Louise Oldham	792	44.3	N/A
Conservative	Betty Margaret Brooks*	715	40.0	−9.9
Labour	Lucy Olivia Spoors	414	23.2	+6.5
Liberal Democrats	Klaus Becher	272	15.2	+3.4
Turnout		1,787	34.21	
Registered electors		5,268		
Conservative hold				
Independent gain from Conservative				

=== Balderton South ===
Balderton South (2 seats)
Party	Candidate	Votes	%	±%
Independent	Simon Nicholas Forde	658	56.9	N/A
Independent	Jean Hazel Hall	628	54.3	N/A
Conservative	Lydia Hazel Hurst*	461	39.8	−28.1
Conservative	Ronnie White*	397	34.3	−26.0
Turnout		1,157	26.74	
Registered electors		4,353		
Independent gain from Conservative				
Independent gain from Conservative				

=== Beacon ===
Beacon (3 seats)
Party	Candidate	Votes	%	±%
Independent	Susan Crosby	1,213	59.7	N/A
Independent	Rowan Sally Cozens	1,180	58.0	N/A
Independent	David Michael Moore	906	44.6	N/A
Conservative	Rita Crowe*	709	34.9	−7.9
Conservative	David James Lloyd*	694	34.1	−7.9
Conservative	Mathew James Skinner*	666	32.8	−7.2
Turnout		2,033	30.01	
Registered electors		6,831		
Independent gain from Conservative				
Independent gain from Conservative				
Independent gain from Conservative				

=== Bilsthorpe ===
Bilsthorpe (1 seat)
Party	Candidate	Votes	%	±%
Conservative	Rhona Holloway*	412	52.2	−9.8
Labour	Matt Kerry	377	47.8	+9.8
Turnout		789	28.62	
Registered electors		2,785		
Conservative hold				

=== Boughton ===
Boughton (1 seat)
Party	Candidate	Votes	%	±%
Conservative	Tim Wildgust*	376	52.4	±0.0
Labour	Marc Steele	342	47.6	±0.0
Turnout		718	30.93	
Registered electors		2,341		
Conservative hold				

=== Bridge ===
Bridge (2 seats)
Party	Candidate	Votes	%	±%
Independent	Debbie Darby	500	46.6	N/A
Independent	Irene Brown	381	35.5	−19.8
Labour	Lisa June Geary	317	29.5	+3.9
Independent	Mick Darby	249	23.2	N/A
Conservative	Tony Roberts	224	20.9	−2.1
Conservative	Andrew Christopher Rainbow	175	16.3	−3.4
Reform	Robert Guy Michael Palmer	69	6.4	N/A
Turnout		1,074	22.05	
Registered electors		4,934		
Independent hold				
Independent hold				

Bridge ward had been held by Conservative councillors Simon Haynes and Jack Kellas immediately prior to the election. They had both been elected at a by-election on 1 July 2021. Seats shown as independent hold to allow comparison with 2019 results. Simon Haynes and Jack Kellas both stood in Farndon and Fernwood ward in 2023 rather than Bridge ward. Bridge ward had been held by Conservative councillors Simon Haynes and Jack Kellas immediately prior to the election. They had won their seats at a two-seat by-election on 1 July 2021 following the departure of the two independent councillors elected in 2019, Gill Dawn and Irene Brown. Brown was re-elected in 2023. Seats shown as independent hold to allow comparison with 2019 results. Simon Haynes and Jack Kellas both stood in Farndon and Fernwood ward in 2023 rather than Bridge ward.

=== Castle ===
Castle (1 seat)
Party	Candidate	Votes	%	±%
Independent	Adrian Charles Amer	261	34.8	N/A
Labour	Glenn William Barker	253	33.8	+3.5
Conservative	Jenni Oliver	235	31.4	−11.2
Turnout		749	28.85	
Registered electors		2,627		
Independent gain from Conservative				

=== Collingham ===
Collingham (2 seats)
Party	Candidate	Votes	%	±%
Conservative	Linda Elaine Dales*	1,049	55.0	+12.5
Conservative	Phil Farmer	847	44.4	N/A
Liberal Democrats	Marylyn Rayner	683	35.8	+14.0
Liberal Democrats	Phil Barron	662	34.7	N/A
Green	Martin James Lunn	303	15.9	N/A
Turnout		1,907	40.07	
Registered electors		4,784		
Conservative hold				
Conservative gain from Independent				

Both Collingham seats were held by Conservatives immediately prior to the election, with Conservative councillor Emma Davis having won her seat in a by-election in 2022 following the death of the independent councillor elected in 2019. Emma Davis did not stand for re-election in 2023. Seat shown as a Conservative gain from independent to allow comparison with 2019 results.

=== Devon ===
Devon (3 seats)
Party	Candidate	Votes	%	±%
Independent	Neil Ross	910	56.0	N/A
Labour	Matthew Joseph Thomson Spoors	671	41.3	+6.9
Labour	Paul Taylor	640	39.4	+8.9
Conservative	Bob Crowe*	530	32.6	−4.9
Conservative	Max Cope*	514	31.6	−6.7
Conservative	Keith Frank Girling*	501	30.8	+0.4
Turnout		1,625	24.89	
Registered electors		6,598		
Independent gain from Conservative				
Labour hold				
Labour gain from Conservative				

Keith Girling was the sitting councillor for Castle ward prior to the election.

=== Dover Beck ===
Dover Beck (1 seat)
Party	Candidate	Votes	%	±%
Conservative	Roger James Jackson*	668	71.1	−5.7
Labour	Joseph Maurice Spoors	270	28.8	+5.6
Turnout		938	38.57	
Registered electors		2,450		
Conservative hold				

=== Edwinstowe and Clipstone ===
Edwinstowe and Clipstone (3 seats)
Party	Candidate	Votes	%	±%
Labour	Paul Stephen Peacock*	1,330	54.7	+9.8
Labour	Andrew Freeman*	1,248	51.3	+8.8
Labour	Anne Celia Brooks	1,172	48.2	+5.0
Conservative	Scott Carlton*	1,081	44.4	−0.7
Conservative	Rebecca Spademan	938	38.6	−5.6
Conservative	Nigel Jeremy Booth	864	35.5	−7.8
Turnout		2,433	27.55	
Registered electors		8,918		
Labour hold				
Labour gain from Conservative				
Labour gain from Conservative				

Andrew Freeman had won his seat in a by-election in 2022 following the death of a Conservative elected in 2019. Seat shown as Labour gain from Conservative to allow comparison with 2019 election.

=== Farndon and Fernwood ===
Farndon and Fernwood (3 seats)
Party	Candidate	Votes	%	±%
Conservative	Simon Edward Haynes*	834	42.1	−12.0
Conservative	Neil Allen	829	41.8	−7.7
Conservative	Jack Logan Kellas*	823	41.5	−6.5
Independent	Declan Patrick Logue	627	31.6	N/A
Labour	Jane Elizabeth Olson	593	29.9	+10.7
Liberal Democrats	Chris Adams	511	25.8	−5.3
Liberal Democrats	Ryan Thomas Cullen	419	21.1	−2.3
Liberal Democrats	Tom Geraghty	369	18.6	−8.6
Turnout		1,982	34.13	
Registered electors		5,837		
Conservative hold				
Conservative hold				
Conservative hold				

Simon Haynes and Jack Kellas were both sitting councillors for Bridge ward prior to the election.

=== Farnsfield ===
Farnsfield (1 seat)
Party	Candidate	Votes	%	±%
Labour	Maurice Arthur Shakeshaft	604	51.4	+32.5
Conservative	Robert Bruce Laughton* (Bruce Laughton)	572	48.6	−5.7
Turnout		1,176	47.72	
Registered electors		2,517		
Labour gain from Conservative				

=== Lowdham ===
Lowdham (1 seat)
Party	Candidate	Votes	%	±%
Conservative	Tim Wendels*	594	61.7	+4.0
Labour	Kevin Treverton Scoles	369	38.3	+26.6
Turnout		963	42.72	
Registered electors		2,266		
Conservative hold				

=== Muskham ===
Muskham (1 seat)
Party	Candidate	Votes	%	±%
Conservative	Sue Saddington*	618	55.5	−16.8
Green	Jude Andrews	268	24.1	N/A
Labour	Adrian James Loftus	228	20.5	+8.5
Turnout		1,114	45.8	
Registered electors		2,428		
Conservative hold				

=== Ollerton ===
Ollerton (3 seats)
Party	Candidate	Votes	%	±%
Labour	Mike Pringle*	1,198	72.0	+17.4
Labour	Alice Brazier	963	57.8	+8.3
Labour	Lee Robert Brazier*	953	57.2	−2.1
Conservative	Kelly Fordham	501	30.1	−2.8
Turnout		1,665	22.95	
Registered electors		7,345		
Labour hold				
Labour hold				
Labour hold				

=== Rainworth North and Rufford ===
Rainworth North and Rufford (2 seats)
Party	Candidate	Votes	%	±%
Labour	Linda Mary Tift	632	44.9	+3.9
Labour	Claire Penny	549	39.0	+6.2
Conservative	Lois Kirsten Fisher	482	34.3	−21.5
Conservative	Petra Harvey-Barker	460	32.7	−21.0
Independent	Carrie Young	258	18.3	N/A
Green	Sheila Greatrex-White	163	11.6	N/A
TUSC	Kirsty Denman	40	2.8	N/A
Turnout		1,407	27.54	
Registered electors		5,110		
Labour gain from Conservative				
Labour gain from Conservative				

=== Rainworth South and Blidworth ===
Rainworth South and Blidworth (2 seats)
Party	Candidate	Votes	%	±%
Independent	Tina Thompson*	516	39.4	N/A
Conservative	Tom Smith*	448	34.2	+4.6
Conservative	Gary Frazer Fisher	419	32.0	+6.7
Labour	Bill Bates	376	28.7	−10.3
Independent	Martin Gary Atherton	347	26.5	−2.5
Labour	Callam Walsh	266	20.3	−14.5
Independent	Edward Litchfield	124	9.5	N/A
Turnout		1,310	29.45	
Registered electors		4,469		
Independent gain from Labour				
Conservative gain from Labour				

Tina Thompson had won her seat in a by-election in 2021 following the death of the Labour councillor elected in 2019. Seat shown as an independent gain from Labour to allow comparison with 2019 results. Tom Smith was the sitting councillor for Rainworth North and Rufford ward prior to the election.

=== Southwell ===
Southwell (3 seats)
Party	Candidate	Votes	%	±%
Conservative	Penny Rainbow*	1,355	42.8	−2.6
Liberal Democrats	Peter Richard Bloomfield Harris*	1,346	42.5	−3.7
Liberal Democrats	Karen Roberts	1,314	41.5	+1.9
Liberal Democrats	Jeremy Michael Berridge	1,039	32.8	−6.5
Conservative	Curtis Marshall	1,000	31.6	−7.3
Conservative	Michael John Jeffrey	955	30.2	−7.6
Labour	Jamie Oliver William Bostock	878	27.7	+14.4
Green	Steven Patrick Morris	540	17.1	N/A
Independent	Jools Cosgrove	186	5.9	N/A
Turnout		3,165	45.3	
Registered electors		7,038		
Conservative hold				
Liberal Democrats hold				
Liberal Democrats hold				

=== Sutton-on-Trent ===
Sutton-on-Trent (1 seat)
Party	Candidate	Votes	%	±%
Conservative	Sylvia Mary Michael*	544	51.4	N/A
Independent	Roger John Bell	515	48.6	N/A
Turnout		1,059	42.3	
Registered electors		2,539		
Conservative hold				

=== Trent ===
Trent (1 seat)
Party	Candidate	Votes	%	±%
Liberal Democrats	Keith Myers Melton	555	47.7	+18.0
Conservative	Malcolm Yates	506	43.5	−9.8
Green	Eric Bignell	102	8.8	−0.6
Turnout		1,163	49.35	
Registered electors		2,369		
Liberal Democrats gain from Conservative				

== Changes 2023–2027 ==
- On 21 January 2024, Adrian Amer left the Independents for Newark & District group and became a non-aligned independent.
- On 29 July 2024, Labour councillor Matthew Spoors joined the Green Party. On 11 August 2024, independent councillor Emma Oldham also joined the Green Party, and the two councillors formed a Green group on the council.
- On 23 November 2024, Linda Dales and Rhona Holloway left the Conservative group and became non-aligned independents.
- On 16 January 2025, Johno Lee left the Conservative group and became a non-aligned independent.
- In May 2025, Linda Dales rejoined the Conservative group.
- On 9 March 2026, Rowan Cozens left the Independents for Newark & District group and joined the Labour group.
- Following the November 2025 by-elections, Kay Smith and Michelle Home formed a Reform group on the council.

=== By-elections ===
==== Balderton North & Coddington ====
Balderton North & Coddington by-election, 6 November 2025
Party	Candidate	Votes	%	±%
Reform	Kay Smith	545	42.0	N/A
Conservative	Janette Barlow	480	37.0	−8.3
Green	Martin Lunn	173	13.3	N/A
Labour	Tracey Jevons-Hazzard	101	7.8	−15.4
Majority		65	5.0	N/A
Turnout		1,299	25.3	−8.9
Registered electors		5,150		
Reform gain from Green				

The by-election followed the resignation of Green councillor Emma Louise Oldham.

==== Castle ====
Castle by-election, 6 November 2025
Party	Candidate	Votes	%	±%
Reform	Michelle Home	204	29.0	N/A
Conservative	Mathew Skinner	193	27.4	−4.0
Labour	Lisa Geary	88	12.5	−21.3
Independent	Jane Harrison	74	10.5	−24.3
Liberal Democrats	Alla Musson	70	9.9	N/A
Green	Bee Newboult	61	8.7	N/A
Independent	Glenis Rix	14	2.0	N/A
Majority		11	1.6	N/A
Turnout		704	26.5	−2.4
Registered electors		2,660		
Reform gain from Independent				

The by-election followed the resignation of independent councillor Adrian Charles Amer.

==== Dover Beck ====
Dover Beck by-election: 29 October 2026
Party	Candidate	Votes	%	±%
Conservative	Scott Carlton	409	41.7	−29.4
Reform	John Hart	328	33.5	N/A
Labour	Kevin Scoles	148	15.1	−13.7
Liberal Democrats	Stephen Andersen	73	7.4	N/A
Green	Lucy Spoors	22	2.2	N/A
Majority		81	8.2	−34.1
Turnout		980	41.0	+2.4
Conservative hold				
