= Newark and Sherwood =

Non-metropolitan local government district in Nottinghamshire, England

Coordinates: 53.10°N 0.95°W

- Non-metropolitan district
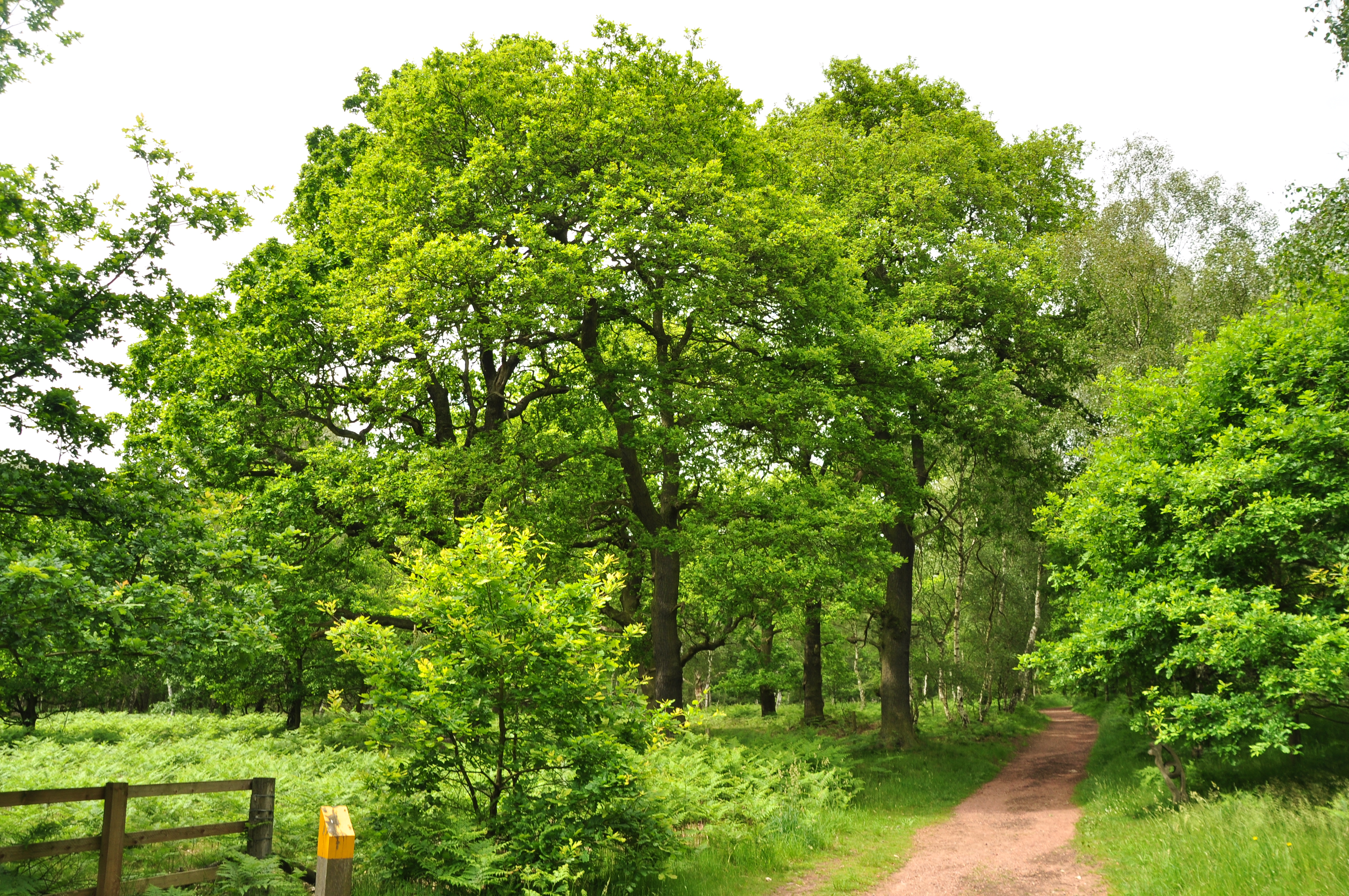
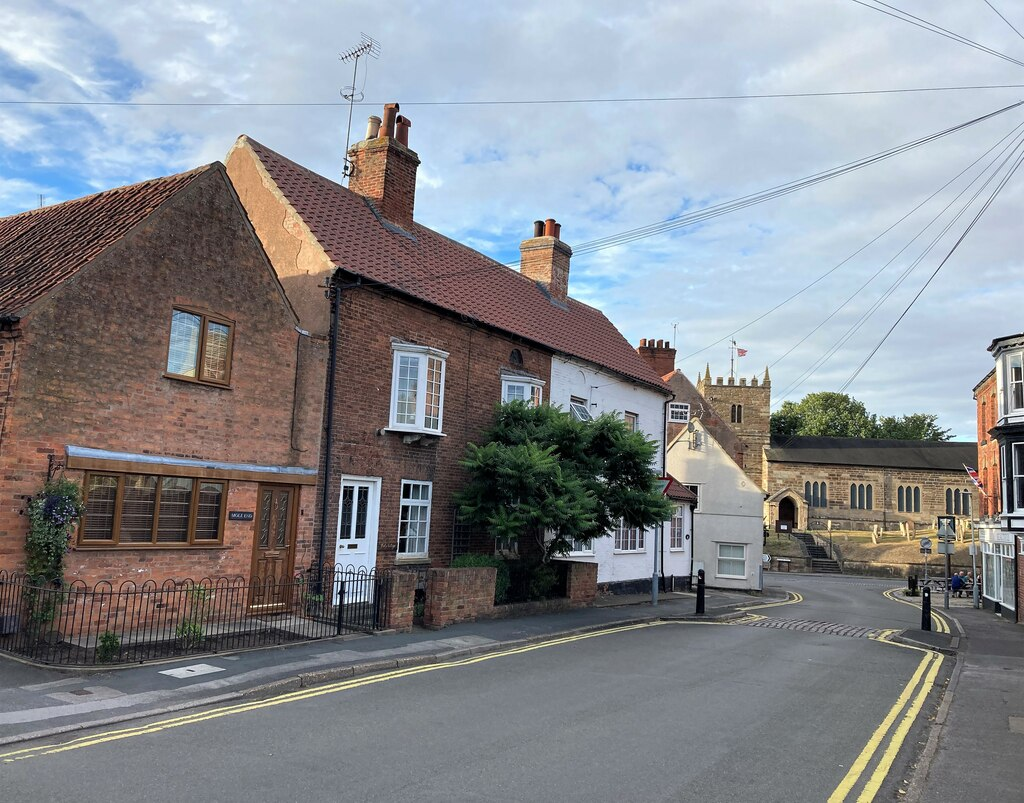
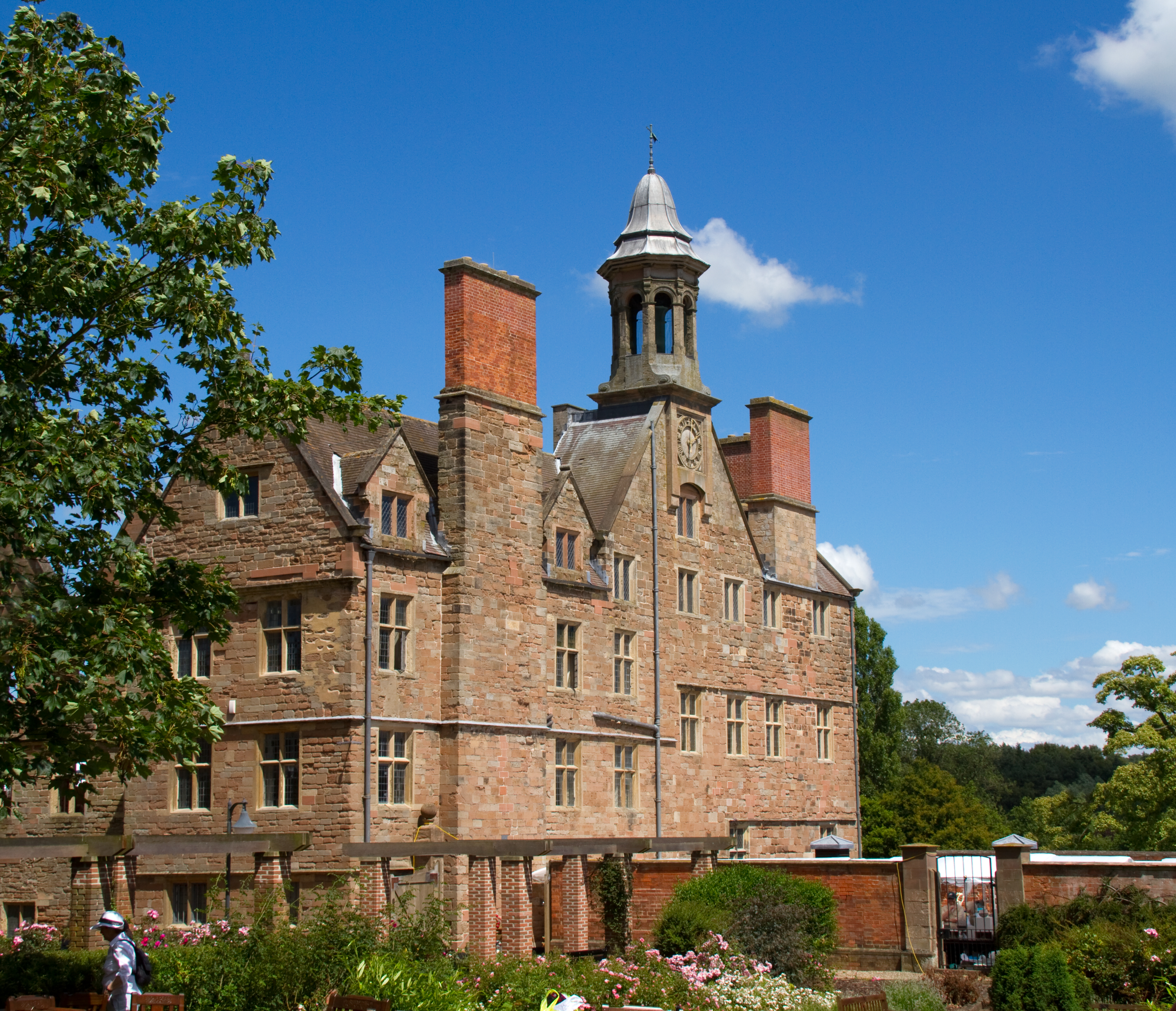
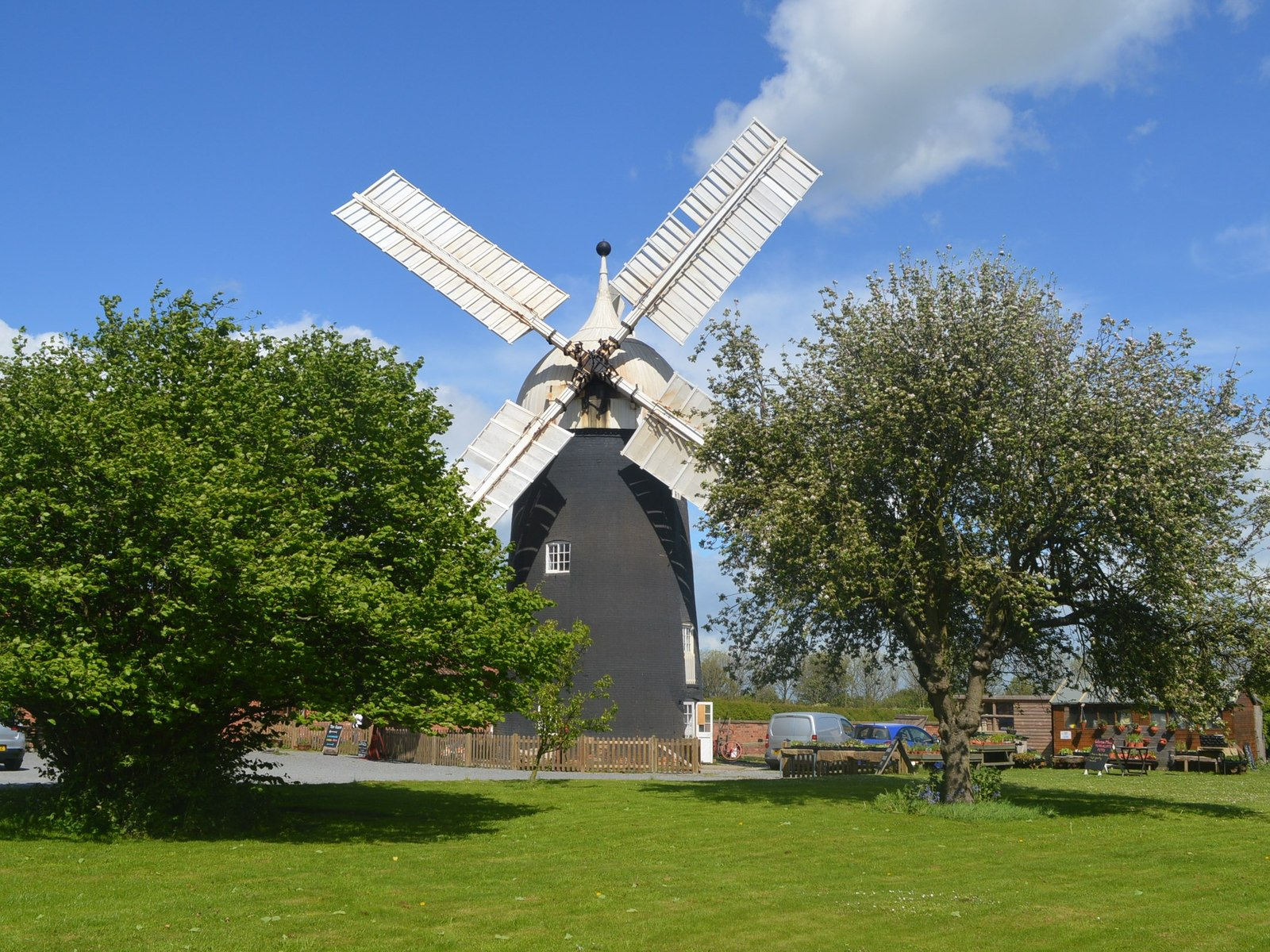
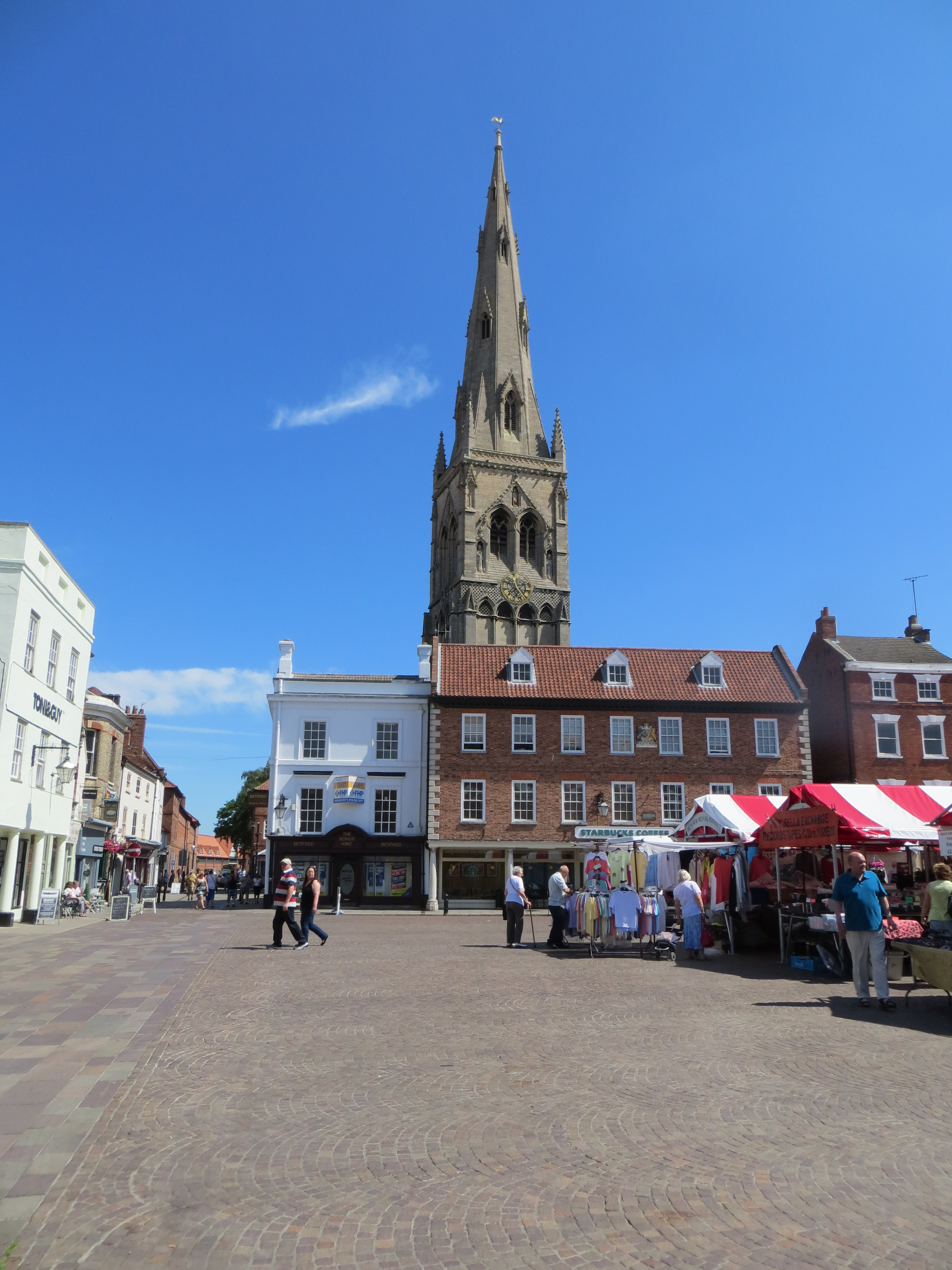
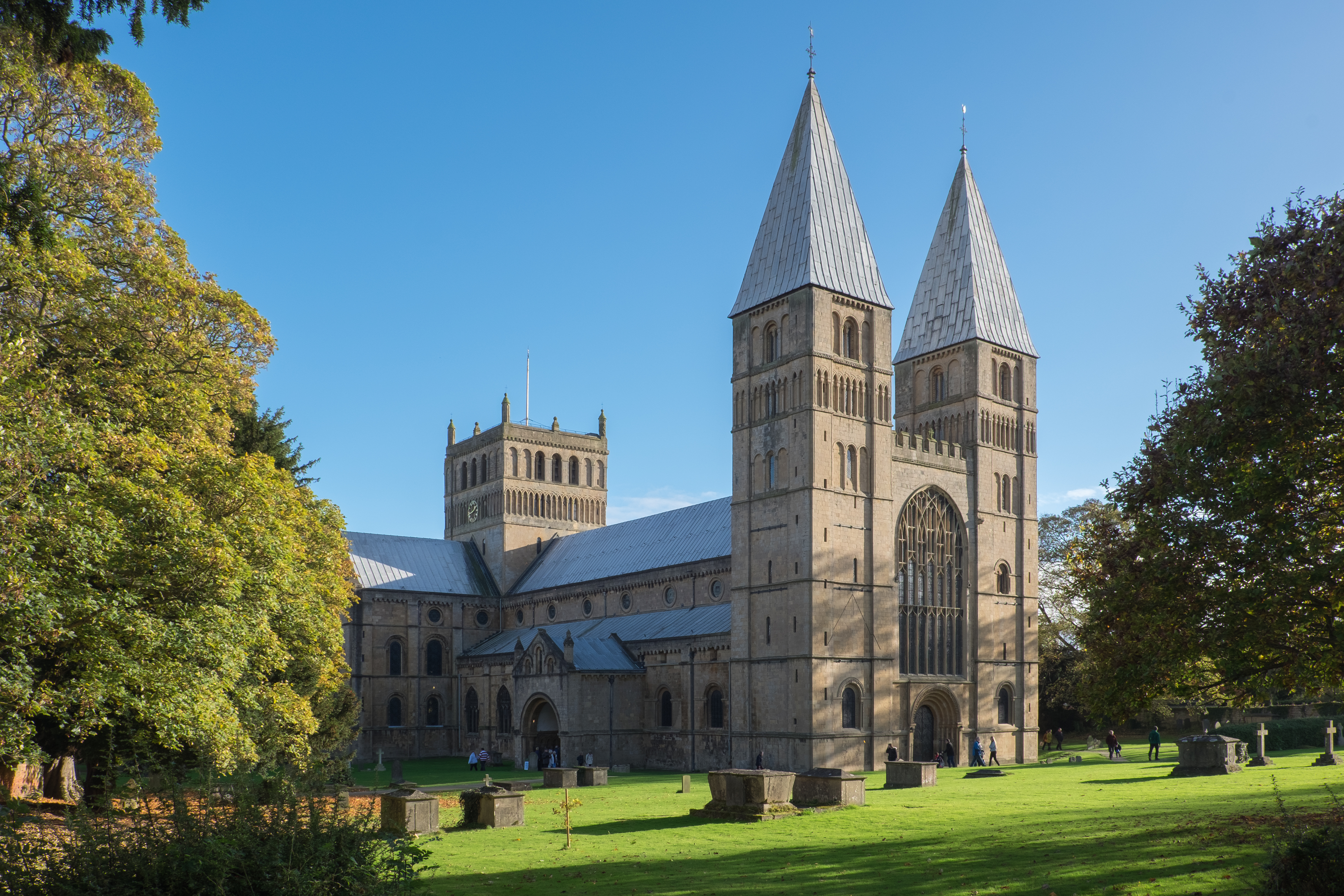
- From left to right: Top: Sherwood Forest; Middle 1st: Ollerton and Rufford Abbey; Middle 2nd: Tuxford Windmill and Newark on Trent market place with the parish church and spire; Lower: Southwell Minster

- Shown within Nottinghamshire
- Sovereign state: United Kingdom
- Constituent country: England
- Region: East Midlands
- Administrative county: Nottinghamshire
- Admin. HQ: Newark-on-Trent

Government
  - Type: Newark and Sherwood District Council
  - MPs: Robert Jenrick, Michelle Welsh

Area
  - Total: 251 sq mi (651 km^{2})
  - Rank: 52nd

Population (2025)
  - Total: 128,684
  - Rank: Ranked 191st
  - Density: 512/sq mi (198/km^{2})

Ethnicity (2021)
  - Ethnic groups: List: 96.3% White; 1.1% Asian; 1.5% Mixed; 0.7% Black; 0.5% other

Religion (2021)
  - Religion: List: 54.5% Christianity; 43.7% no religion; 1.2% other; 0.6% Islam
- Time zone: UTC+0 (Greenwich Mean Time)
  - Summer (DST): UTC+1 (British Summer Time)
- ONS code: 37UG (ONS); E07000175 (GSS)
- Ethnicity: 98.5% White

Newark and Sherwood is a local government district in Nottinghamshire, England. It is the largest district by area in the county. The council is based in Newark-on-Trent, the area's largest town. The district also includes the towns of Southwell and Ollerton along with a large rural area containing many villages. Much of the district lies within the ancient Sherwood Forest and there are also extensive forestry plantations in the area.

The neighbouring districts are Rushcliffe, Gedling, Ashfield, Mansfield, Bassetlaw, West Lindsey, North Kesteven, South Kesteven and Melton. In 2021 it had a population of 123,383.

== History ==
The district was created on 1 April 1974 under the Local Government Act 1972, covering three former districts which were all abolished at the same time:

- Newark Municipal Borough
- Newark Rural District
- Southwell Rural District

The new district was initially named Newark, after its largest town. The name was changed to Newark and Sherwood in 1985.

Under current local government reorganisation plans, all district councils in Nottinghamshire, as well as the county council, will be abolished in 2028, with the district becoming part of a new Nottinghamshire unitary authority.

== Governance ==
Newark and Sherwood District Council

Type
- Type: Non-metropolitan district

Leadership
- Chair: David Moore, Independent since 19 May 2026
- Leader: Paul Peacock, Labour since 23 May 2023
- Chief Executive: John Robinson since 23 July 2018

Structure
- Seats: 39 councillors
- Graph of the party split among 39 seats.
- Political groups: Administration (19) Labour (11) Liberal Democrat (3) Independent (5) Other parties (20) Conservative (12) Reform UK (2) Green (1) Independent (5)

Elections
- Voting system: First past the post
- Last election: 4 May 2023
- Next election: 6 May 2027

Meeting place
- Castle House, Great North Road, Newark, NG24 1BY

Website
- www.newark-sherwooddc.gov.uk

Map of Newark and Sherwood district.

Newark and Sherwood District Council provides district-level services. County-level services are provided by Nottinghamshire County Council. The whole district is also covered by civil parishes, which form a third tier of local government.

Newark and Sherwood has been a non-constituent member of the East Midlands Combined County Authority since May 2024, which is led by a regional mayor.

=== Political control ===
The council has been under no overall control since the 2023 election, being run by a partnership of Labour, the "Independents for Newark and District" group of independent councillors, and the Liberal Democrats.

The first election to the council was held in 1973, initially operating as a shadow authority alongside the outgoing authorities before coming into its powers on 1 April 1974. Since 1974 political control of the council has been as follows:

Party in control	Years
Labour	1974–1976
Conservative	1976–1979
No overall control	1979–1991
Labour	1991–1999
No overall control	1999–2007
Conservative	2007–2023
No overall control	2023–present

=== Leadership ===
The leaders of the council since 2003 have been:

Councillor	Party	From	To
Tony Roberts	Conservative	2003	15 May 2012
Roger Blaney	Conservative	15 May 2012	May 2018
David Lloyd	Conservative	May 2018	May 2023
Paul Peacock	Labour	23 May 2023	

=== Composition ===
Following the 2023 election, and subsequent changes of allegiance up to September 2026, the composition of the council was:

Party	Seats
Labour	11
Liberal Democrats	3
Conservative	12
Reform	2
Green	1
Independent	10
Total	39

Of the ten independent councillors, four sit together as the "Independents for Newark and District", two form the "Newark and Sherwood District Independents" group, and the other four are not aligned to any group. Positions on the council's cabinet are held by Labour, the Liberal Democrats, members of the Independents for Newark and District group and one of the non-aligned independents. The next election is due in 2027.

=== Elections ===
Since the last full review of boundaries in 2015 the council has comprised 39 councillors representing 21 wards, with each ward electing one, two or three councillors. Elections are held every four years.

The district is covered by two parliamentary constituencies: Newark, created in 1885, which has been represented by Robert Jenrick, of Reform UK, since 2014; and was held by the Conservative Party from 2001 until Jenrick's defection in 2026; and Sherwood Forest, created in 1983, represented by Michelle Welsh, a Labour MP, elected in 2024.

=== Premises ===
The council is based at Castle House, on Great North Road in Newark, adjacent to Newark Castle railway station. The building was purpose-built for the council and opened in 2017.

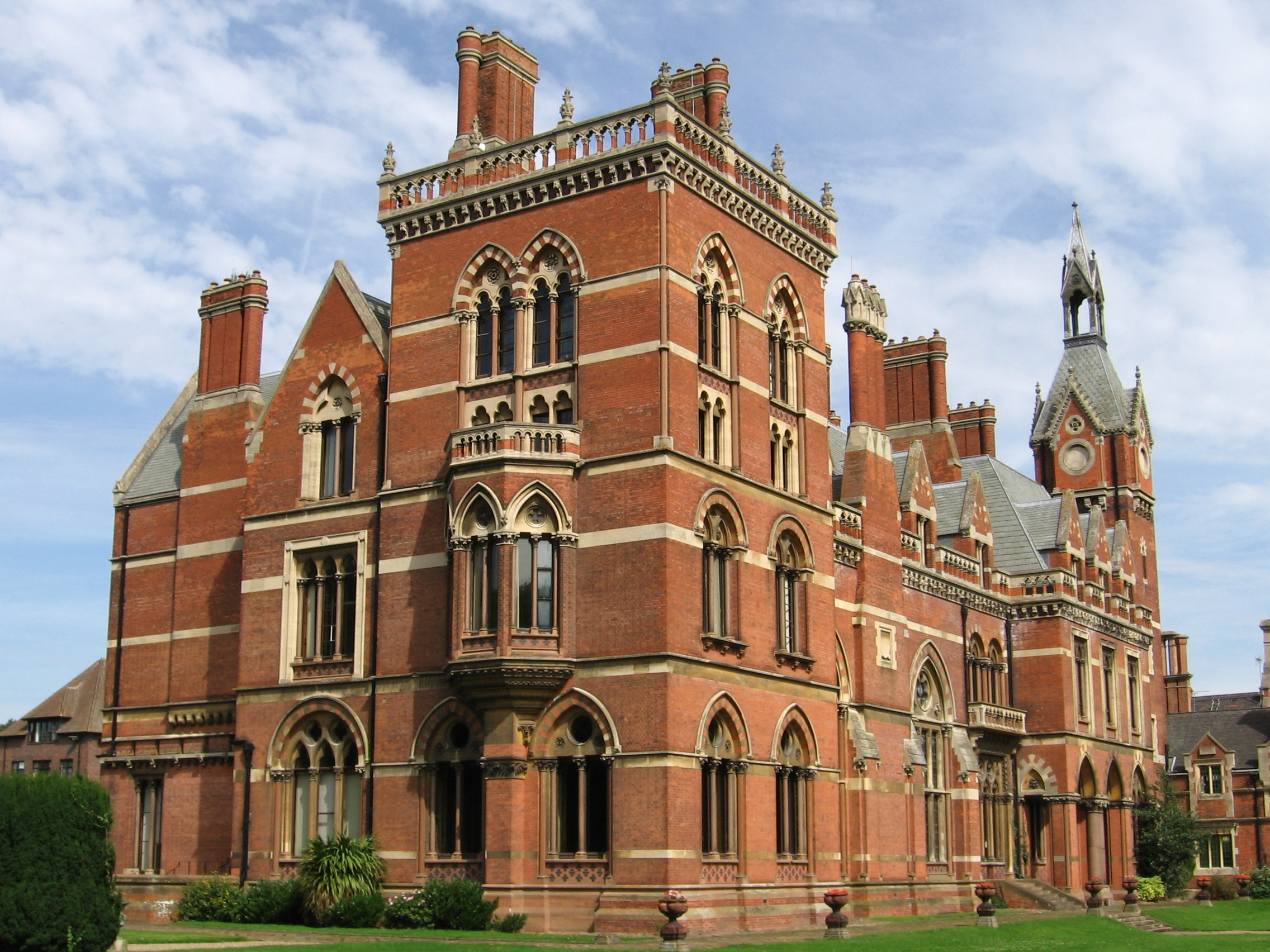
Kelham Hall: Council's headquarters 1974–2017

The council was previously based at Kelham Hall in the village of Kelham, which had been purchased early in 1974 as part of preparations for the local government reorganisation later that year.

== Settlements ==
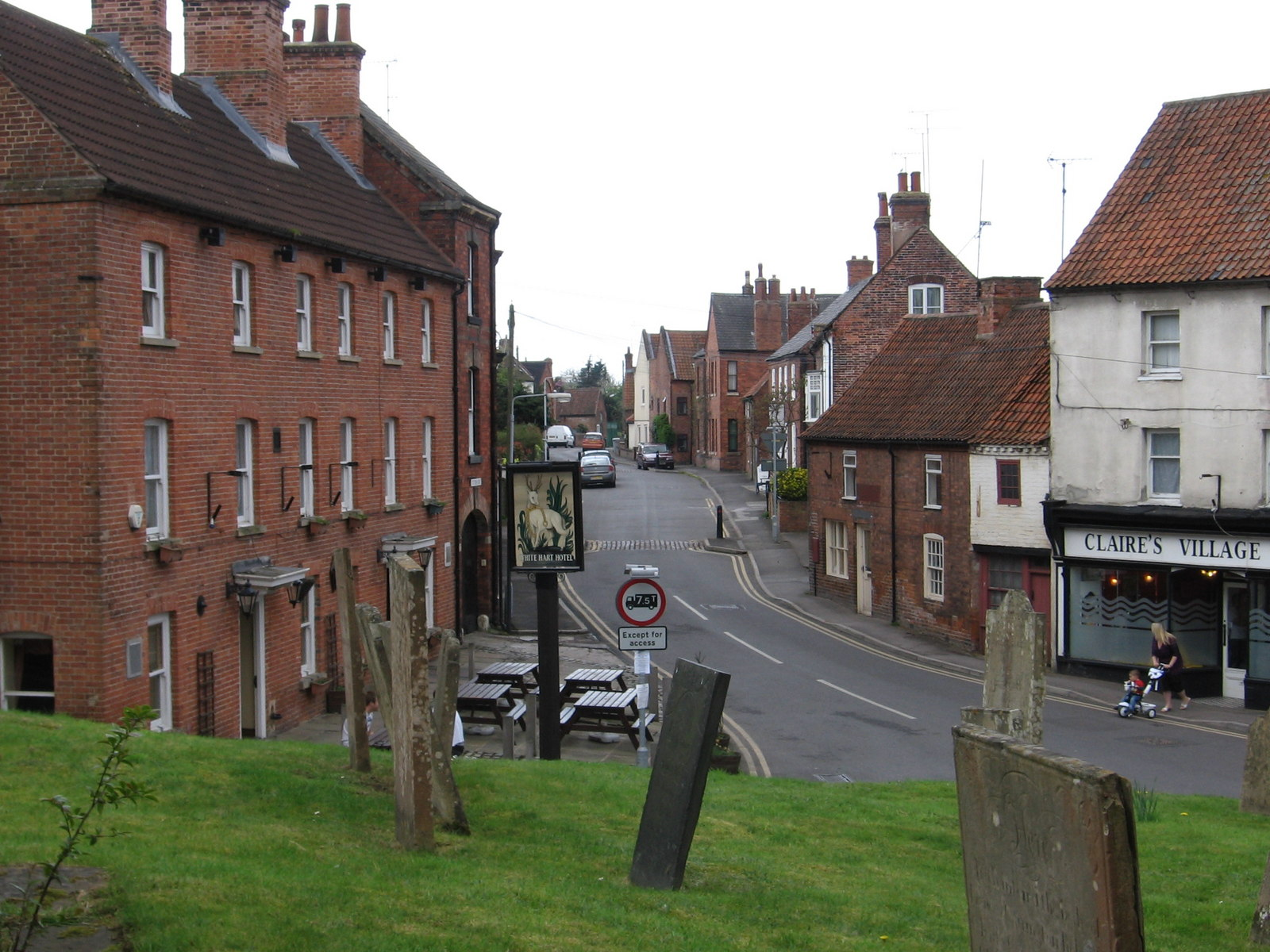
Ollerton, the second largest settlement in Newark and Sherwood

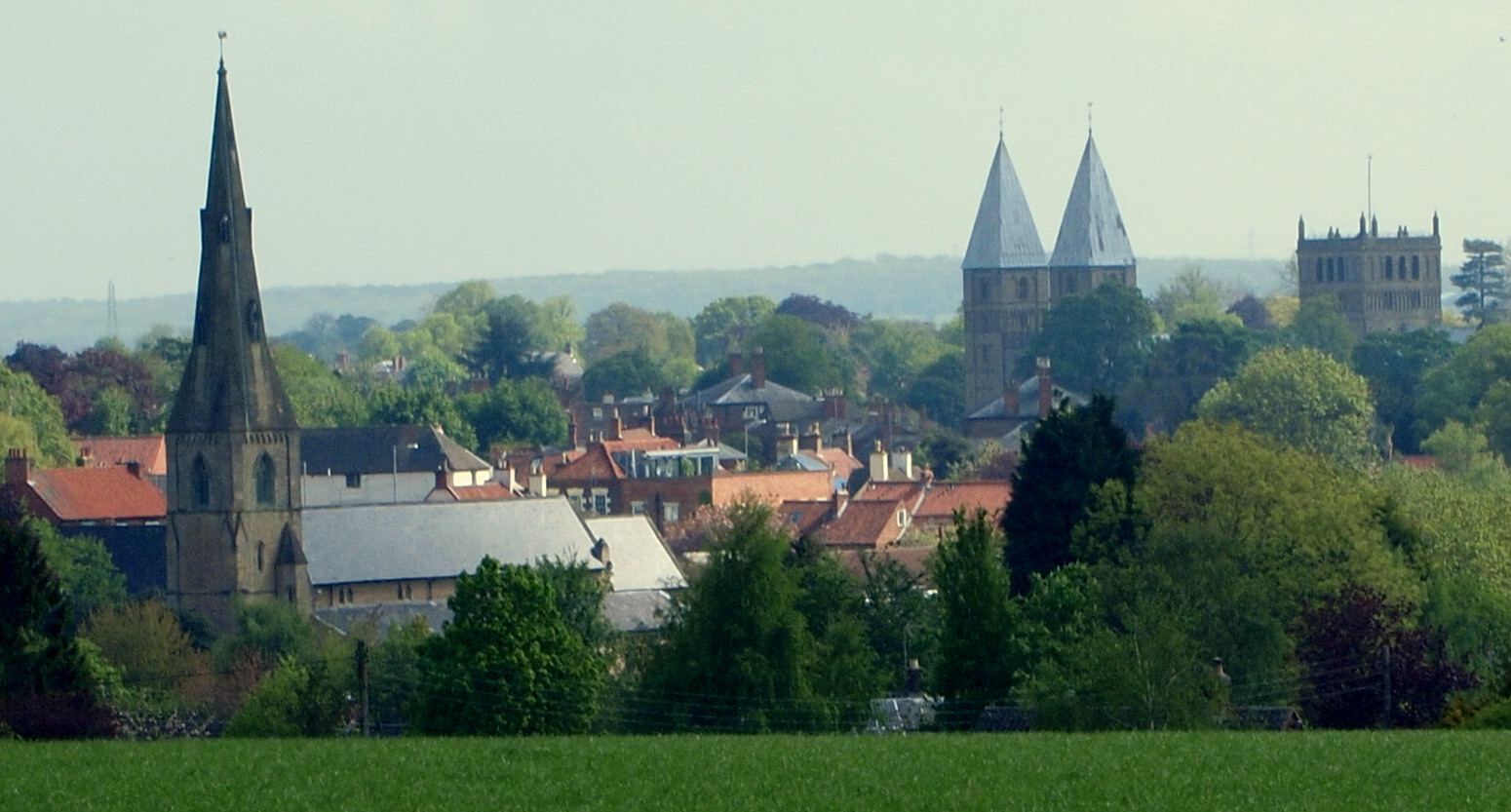
Southwell, home of Southwell Minster and the third-largest settlement in the district

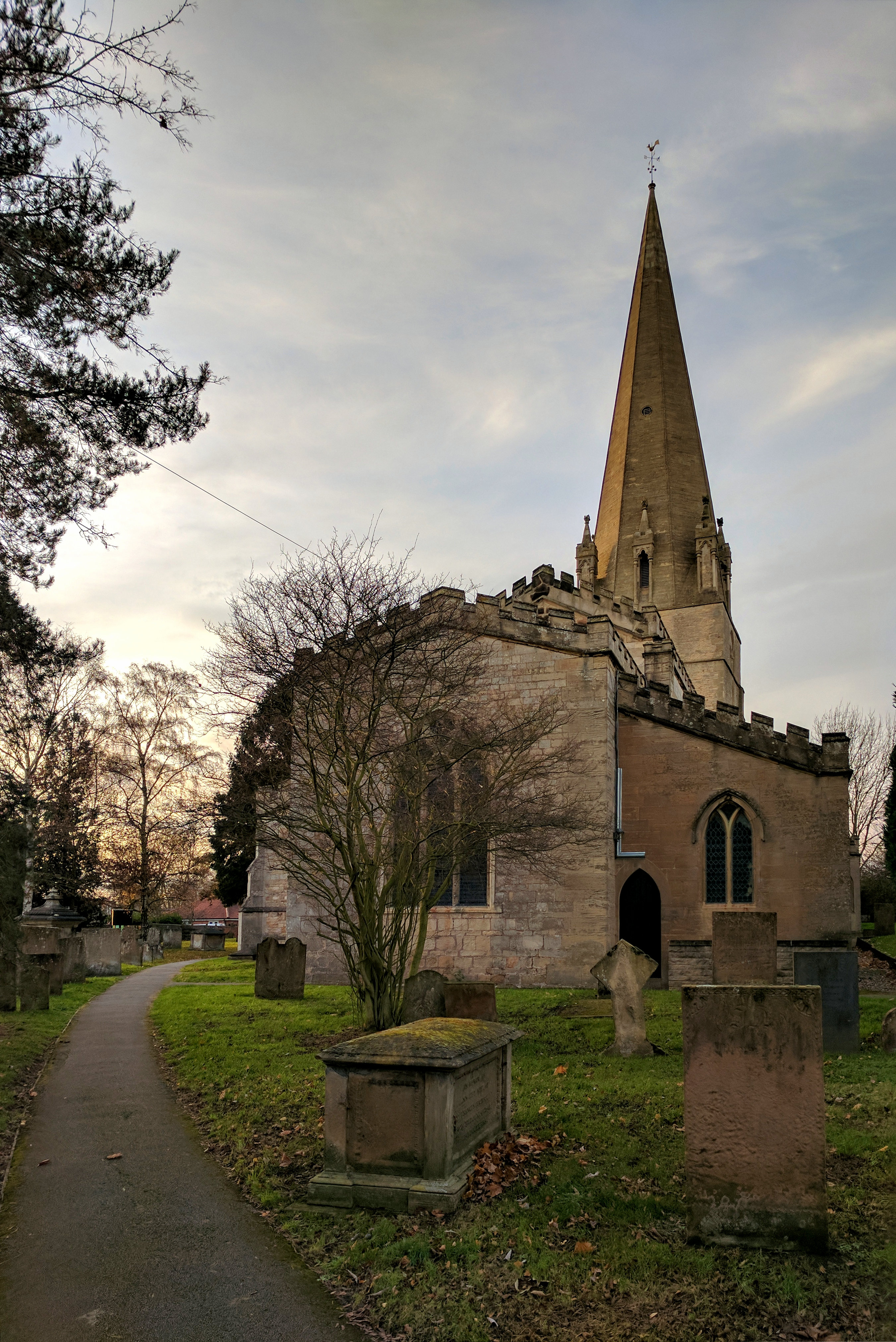
Edwinstowe, a village which legends link with Robin Hood

The whole district is divided into civil parishes. The parish councils for the three parishes of Newark, Ollerton and Boughton, and Southwell have declared their parishes to be towns, allowing them to take the style "town council".

Newark-on-Trent, together with Balderton, forms the largest urban area in the district. Newark-on-Trent has many important historic features including Newark Castle, St Mary's Magdalene Church, Georgian architecture and a defensive earthwork from the British Civil Wars. Other important towns in the district include Ollerton and Southwell which is home to Southwell Minster and Southwell Racecourse. Other settlements in the district include:

Averham
Balderton, Bathley, Beacon, Bilsthorpe, Blidworth, Boughton, Bridge, Brough
Carlton-on-Trent, Castle, Caunton, Clipstone, Collingham, Cromwell
Devon
Eakring, Edingley, Edwinstowe, Egmanton
Farndon, Farnsfield, Fernwood, Fiskerton
Gunthorpe
Halam, Halloughton, Hawton, Hockerton
Kelham, Kirklington, Kirton, Kneesall
Laxton, Little Carlton, Lowdham
Magnus, Maplebeck, Morton
North Muskham, Norwell
Ossington, Oxton
Perlethorpe
Rainworth, Rolleston
Sleaford, South Muskham, Sutton-on-Trent
Thurgarton
Upton
Walesby, Wellow, Weston, Winkburn

== Media ==
=== Television ===
The area is served by BBC East Midlands and ITV Central with television signals are received from the Waltham TV transmitter, BBC Yorkshire and Lincolnshire and ITV Yorkshire can also be received from the Belmont TV transmitter.

=== Radio ===
Radio stations that broadcast to the area are:.

BBC Local Radio

- BBC Radio Nottingham

Independent Radio

- Capital East Midlands
- Smooth East Midlands
- Greatest Hits Radio Midlands
- Lincs FM (covering Newark)

Community Radio

- Radio Newark (serving Newark)
- Bowe Radio (for Ollerton and Edwinstowe)
