= Old Town Hall, Bawtry =

Town hall in Bawtry, South Yorkshire, England

The Old Town Hall
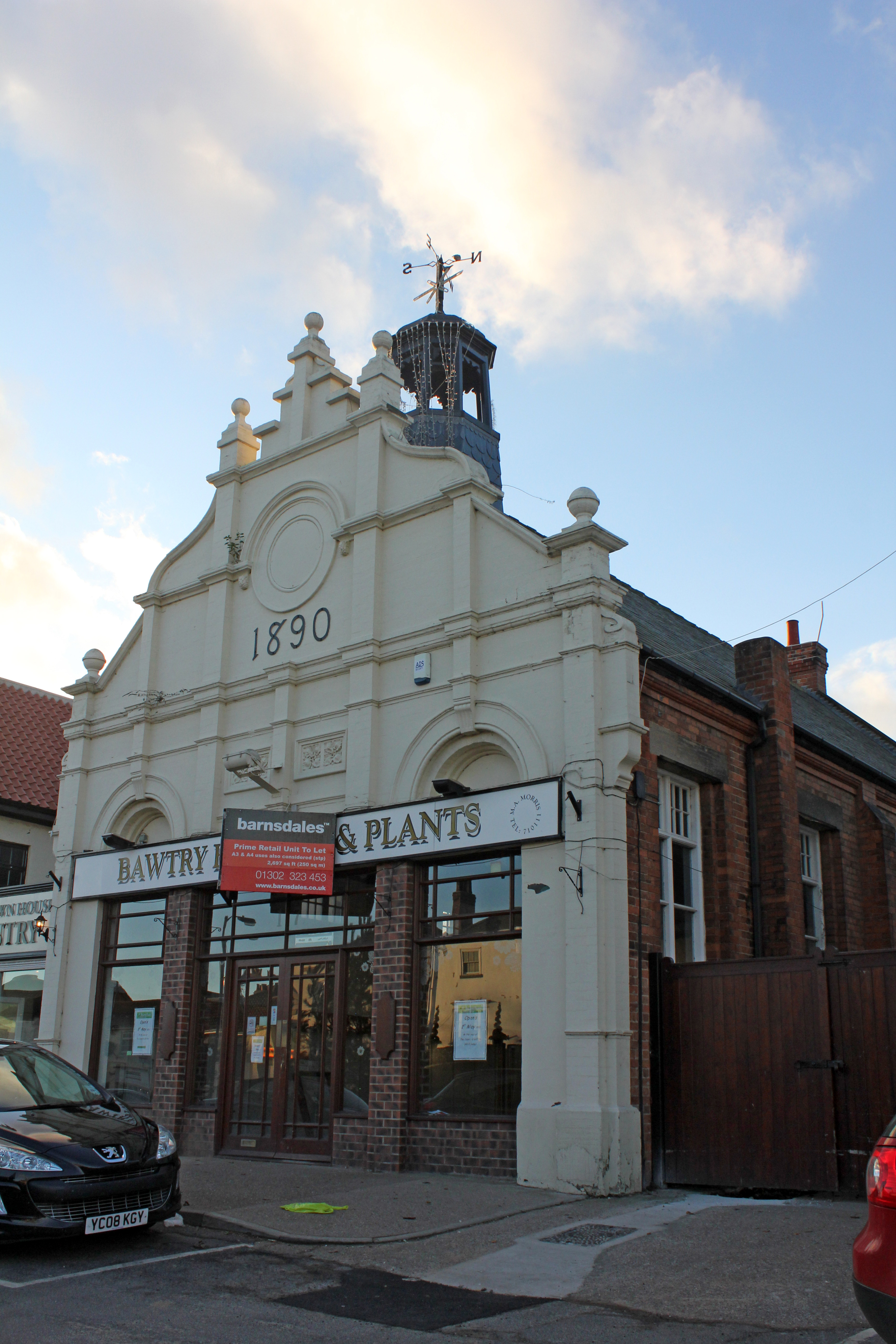
- The building in December 2013

- Shown in South Yorkshire
- 53.4296°N 1.0214°W
- Location: The Market Place, Bawtry

History
- Built: 1890

Site notes
- Architectural style: Victorian style

The Old Town Hall is a former municipal building in the Market Place in Bawtry, a town in South Yorkshire, in England.

== History ==
The building was commissioned by a group of local businessmen who, in 1889, decided to form a company known as the "Bawtry Public Hall Company" to finance and erect a public hall for the town. The foundation stone for the new building was laid by a local solicitor, Francis Raynes, who was chairman of the company, on 26 April 1990. It was designed in the Victorian style, built by R. H. Rawson of Tickhill in red brick with a stucco front at a cost of £1,100, and was officially opened by Raynes on 9 October 1890. The future Secretary of State for War, Lord Houghton, whose seat was at Bawtry Hall, was in attendance.

The main assembly hall, which was 48 feet (15 m) long and 27 feet (8.2 m) wide, had capacity to seat 450 people. Raynes also paid for an illuminated striking clock which was installed in the building at the time for its opening. By 1901, it also had a reading room.

In the wake of the Great depression of British agriculture in the late 19th century, the population of the town fell sharply in the first decade of the 20th century, from 8,188 in 1901 to just 5,168 in 1911. Consequently, the venture was not a commercial success and, after the building had been sold for alternative use, the company was dissolved in 1916.

In the 1930s, the building was converted into a working men's club. In the 1950s, it became a car showroom, and later it became a florist. In 2016, it was converted into an art gallery, with the insertion of a mezzanine floor. In 2024, plans were approved to extend the building to the rear, providing two apartments along with a smaller commercial space at the front. The commercial space was subsequently let to a fashion retailer, Fairfax & Favor.

== Architecture ==
The building is constructed of red brick, with a gabled stucco front, three bays wide. The central bay contains the doorway while the outer bays are fenestrated with round headed windows with moulded surrounds. The main frontage is decorated with seven pilasters which are surmounted by finials. The gable is topped by a lead-clad cupola with a weather vane.
