= Church of St Nicholas, Bawtry =

Anglican church in South Yorkshire, England

St Nicholas' Church
- Church of St Nicholas, Bawtry
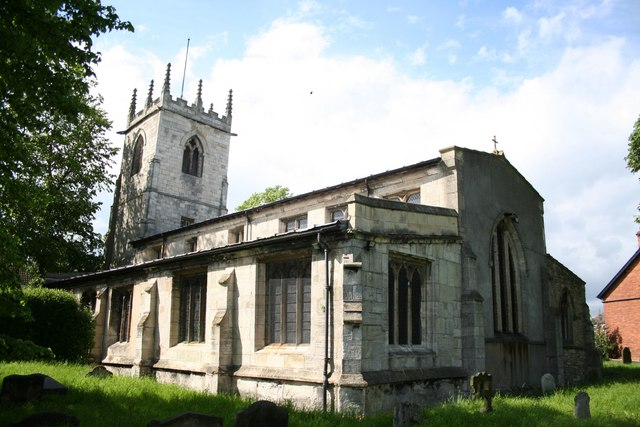
- St.Nicholas' Church, Bawtry
- St Nicholas' Church
- 53.429°N 1.018°W
- OS grid reference: SK 653 929
- Location: Bawtry, South Yorkshire
- Country: England
- Denomination: Anglican
- Website: Official webpage

History
- Status: Parish church
- Founded: 1189-1190

Architecture
- Functional status: Active

Administration
- Diocese: Southwell & Nottingham
- Archdeaconry: Newark
- Deanery: Bassetlaw and Bawtry
- Benefice: Bawtry with Austerfield, Misson, Everton and Mattersey
- Parish: Bawtry with Austerfield

Listed Building – Grade I
- Designated: 4 June 1968
- Reference no.: 1314824

The Church of St Nicholas, is an Anglican church in the town of Bawtry, South Yorkshire, England. Due to the proximity of the church to the wharves on the River Idle in Bawtry, the church is dedicated to St Nicholas, the patron Saint of seafarers. The building is grade I listed, and the churchyard attracts some interest as one of the first colonists aboard the Mayflower bound for the United States of America came from the area, and some of his family are buried there.

== History ==
The church has some origins from the late 12th century (c. 1189-1190), when it is believed that work on the church building started, although the tower was rebuilt between 1712 and 1713, and now houses six bells. The church was opened in c. 1200, and celebrated its 800th anniversary in 1990. The first mention of a church at Bawtry in a royal charter was in 1232 during the reign of Henry II which mentions the chapels of Osterfield (Austerfield), and Bawtry, though the right to perform divine service at the church was not granted by the archbishop of York until 1344. The church was given to the Priory of Blyth by John de Busili sometime between 1199 and 1213, and it acted as a chapel of ease to the mother church at Blyth. A taxation order by the pope in 1291 makes no mention of either Austerfield or Bawtry as they were under the Priory of Blyth at that time.

A Collins guidebook describes the church, especially the north wall, as a "puzzle of Medieval archaeology," as it has many different elements of architecture and historical periods. The chapel on the south side of the church was built in 1446, with £100 (equivalent to £100,000 in 2025) left in a will of someone who had been baptised in the church.

The archway in the north wall is thought to be from a different building in the town that is of medieval origin. The wall is a mixture of sandstone and limestone, whilst the majority of the stone in the church is a magnesian limestone, the local stone in the area. Dark-coloured boards on the north wall have been inscribed with the Ten Commandments. The architecture of the church covers at least different types; parts of the northern end are Norman (the arcade, door and also the east window), the south aisle and south chapel are Perpendicular, and the tower is described as being "Gothic Survival". Morris describes the east window as one of "..the most remarkable in Yorkshire.." having Early English sideshafts and a "dogtooth hood" on the exterior wall. The glass in the window was made by Charles Eamer Kempe. The tower collapsed in 1670, and the whole church was renovated in 1686, with the foundation stones for the west tower being laid in 1712. The tower was built by local stonemasons in the Gothic style, with some historical texts suggesting that the stone came from the nearby ruined Roche Abbey.

Seafarers sailing upriver from the Trent along the River Idle, would use the church as a landmark as it was quite close to the wharves in Bawtry. The church's dedication is that of St Nicholas who was the patron saint of seafarers (among others), and is thought to be the furthest inland church in England with this dedication. The church predates the town, and was closer to the river and the wharves of Bawtry port than it is now; the building of the Great Northern Railway on the east side of town, necessitated moving the River Idle into a straight channel further away from the town.

As William Bradford was born in the parish (at Austerfield), some of his relatives are buried in the churchyard. This attracts tourists in search of the history of the Pilgrim Fathers of America.

The church building itself is a grade I listed structure, whilst the churchyard contains one other listed structure, an oval-shaped headstone to one of those buried within the churchyard which has a very unusual design.

== Parish and administration ==
The church is in the ecclesiastical Parish of Bawtry with Austerfield, and the Benefice of Bawtry with Austerfield, Misson, Everton and Mattersey, which is also known as The River Idle Benefice. This is in the Deanery of Bassetlaw and Bawtry, the Archdeaconry of Newark, and the Diocese of Southwell and Nottingham. In the 19th century, the church was part of the neighbouring parish of Blyth (Blythe), which was in the Deanery of Retford, but in the Diocese of York. In 1858, it was gifted from the Parish of Blyth to Trinity College in Cambridge, and due to the rising population, the church became a parish church within the new parish of Bawtry-with-Austerfield. In 1920, the patronage of the church was bought by a local family, and gifted to the Bishop of Southwell.

== See also ==
- Grade I listed buildings in South Yorkshire
- Listed buildings in Bawtry
