= Listed buildings in Bawtry =

Bawtry is a civil parish in the metropolitan borough of Doncaster, South Yorkshire, England. The parish contains 44 listed buildings that are recorded in the National Heritage List for England. Of these, one is listed at Grade I, the highest of the three grades, one is at Grade II*, the middle grade, and the others are at Grade II, the lowest grade. The parish contains the town of Bawtry and the surrounding area. Most of the listed buildings are in or near the town centre, and include houses and associated structures, shops, offices, churches, a headstone in a churchyard, a market cross, a hotel, a restaurant, public houses, a pinfold, a Masonic Hall and gate, and a war memorial. Outside the town are a listed milepost and a bridge.

== Key ==
Grade	Criteria
I	Buildings of exceptional interest, sometimes considered to be internationally important
II*	Particularly important buildings of more than special interest
II	Buildings of national importance and special interest

== Buildings ==
Name and location	Photograph	Date	Notes	Grade
St Nicholas' Church; 53.42971°N 1.01826°W		c. 1200	The church was altered and extended through the centuries, the tower was rebuilt in 1712–13, and the church was restored in 1899–1901 by C. Hodgson Fowler. It is built in magnesian limestone with lead roofs, and consists of a nave with a clerestory, north and south aisles, a chancel with a south chapel and a north organ chamber and vestry, and a west tower. The tower has three stages, a west doorway and a three-light window. In the third stage is a clock face, and at the top is an embattled parapet with eight crocketed pinnacles.	I
Grove House and Grove Cottage; 53.43054°N 1.01966°W		Late 17th century (probable)	A house, later divided, it was refronted in the 19th century, and is rendered, on a plinth, with an eaves cornice and blocking course, and roof of Welsh slate and tile. There are two storeys, a front range of four bays, a parallel rear range, and a rear wing on the left. The round-arched doorway in the third bay has reeded pilasters, a semicircular fanlight, and an open pediment with mutules and dentils, on carved consoles. The other bays contain bow windows with cornices, and in the upper floor are sash windows in architraves.	II
The Dutch House; 53.43005°N 1.01859°W		Late 17th century (probable)	The house was refronted in the 18th century, and altered later. It is in red brick, with floor bands, and a pantile roof. There are two storeys and attics, a front of three bays, and a rear wing on the right. On the front is a coped parapet and sash windows, the middle window in the ground floor converted from a doorway. In the roof are two later dormers. The left bay of the wing has a shaped gable, and the doorway is to the right.	II
9, 11 and 13 Market Place; 53.42943°N 1.02144°W		1691	A cottage and a later house, both later used for other purposes. The cottage is timber framed, later encased in brick, with dentilled eaves and a Welsh slate roof. There are two storeys, three bays, a shop front, and sash windows. The house, projecting on the right, is in painted brick with a sill band and a pantile roof. There are two storeys and eight bays. In the ground floor are three doorways, a shop window, and a showroom window, and the upper floor contains sash windows. Between the floors at the ends are stone plaques with carvings of lions in relief, and above the upper window in the fourth bay is a date plaque.	II
50 High Street and 2 and 2B Wharf Street; 53.43046°N 1.02020°W		Mid 18th century	A house on a corner site, later divided and partly used for other purposes. It is in red brick, pebbledashed in the upper floor and rendered in the ground floor, with a floor band, coved eaves, and a tile roof. There are two storeys, an L-shaped plan and three bays on each front. On High Street there are two doorways with fanlights, and three canted bay windows with dentilled cornices. In the ground floor on Wharf Street are two bay windows, a bow window and a doorway, and the upper floor on both fronts contains sash windows.	II
Market cross 53.42916°N 1.02127°W		18th century	The market cross is in magnesian limestone, and the base is probably earlier. The cross consists of a plain obelisk on a plinth, on a square base of four tiered steps.	II
The Poplars; 53.43046°N 1.01941°W	—	Mid 18th century	A house that was extended to the rear in the 19th century, it is roughcast, on a plinth, with a dentilled eaves cornice, and a pantile roof with coped gables and shaped kneelers. There are three storeys and three bays, and a rear two-storey outshut. On the front, the central window in the middle floor is a Venetian window with blind side lights, above is a tripartite window with blind side lights, and the other windows are sashes. The entrance is in the right return.	II
Crown Hotel; 53.43031°N 1.02101°W		Mid to late 18th century	The hotel, which was later extended and altered, is rendered with a sill band, and a dentilled band under a projecting parapet with lettering and a two-bay gable. There are two storeys and nine bays, the left bay slightly recessed, with quoins, and possibly later. The fourth and seventh bays have full-height round-arched recesses, the fourth bay containing a doorway with a fanlight, and the seventh bay a segmental-arched carriage entrance. At the rear is a verandah on twelve cast iron columns.	II
Rest Haven; 53.42886°N 1.01943°W	—	Mid to late 18th century	A house in rendered brick, with a pantile roof, two storeys and an attic, a front of three bays, and a two-storey rear wing. The central doorway has a canopy on shaped brackets, and above it is a segmental-arched panel. The outer bays contain sash windows with wooden architraves.	II
34 and 36 Church Street; 53.42898°N 1.01934°W	—	Mid to late 18th century	Two red brick houses, No. 36 roughcast, with pantile roofs. They form an L-shaped plan, with No. 34 projecting on the right. No. 34 has two storeys and an attic, a sash window with a segmental head in each floor on the front, and a gabled dormer in the hipped roof. In the left return is a segmental-arched doorway. No. 36 has two storeys, two bays, and dentilled eaves, In the centre is a doorway, it is flanked by bow windows, and the upper floor contains casement windows.	II
Wharf House; 53.42992°N 1.01862°W	—	Mid to late 18th century	The house is in red brick, with sill bands, and a pantile roof with coped gables and shaped kneelers. There are three storeys and three bays. The central doorway has a fanlight with Gothic glazing bars. The windows in the lower two floors are sashes, and in the top floor are casement windows.	II
22 High Street; 53.42951°N 1.02068°W		Late 18th century	A house later used for other purposes, it is rendered, on a plinth, with rusticated quoins, an eaves cornice, and a hipped tile roof. There are three storeys and a symmetrical front of five bays, the middle bay projecting slightly. In the centre is a round-arched doorway with a semicircular fanlight. The windows are sashes, those in the top floor horizontally-sliding. The window above the doorway has a round head, and above it is a plaque.	II
32 High Street and wing walls 53.42983°N 1.02054°W		Late 18th century	A house, later a shop, it is in stuccoed brick on a plinth, with rusticated quoins, a pedimented gable, and a tile roof, hipped at the rear. There are three storeys and two bays. The central doorway is flanked by bow windows. Above these are iron balustraded balconies on scrolled iron brackets in front of bow windows with deep friezes and cornices. In the top floor are tripartite sash windows. The shop is flanked by wing walls, each containing a segmental archway, over which is a frieze and a cornice, and the walls are surmounted by ribbed urns. In the right return is a doorway with a segmental-arched fanlight, and a cornice on consoles, over which is a round-headed stair window.	II
2, 4 and 6 South Parade; 53.42744°N 1.02162°W	—	Late 18th century	Houses later used for other purposes, they are in red brick with a pantile roof. There are three storeys and seven bays. No. 2 on the right has four bays, the left bay containing a carriage entrance with a rusticated flat arch and a keystone. The middle of the other bays contains a doorway with a rectangular fanlight, and is flanked by shop windows. Nos.4 and 6 have three bays, a modillion eaves cornice, and a central doorway with a rectangular fanlight and a keystone. The windows are sashes with keystones.	II
8 and 10 South Parade; 53.42764°N 1.02149°W	—	Late 18th century	A pair of houses in red brick on a brick plinth, with rusticated quoins, a modillion cornice, and a hipped roof in Welsh slate and pantiles. There are three storeys and seven bays, the middle bay containing a carriage entrance with a rusticated flat arch and a keystone. Both houses have a doorway with an architrave, a rectangular fanlight, a fluted frieze with paterae, and a dentilled pediment. The windows are sashes with keystones, the top window in the middle bay with a segmental head, and the windows above the doorways blind.	II
12 South Parade; 53.42775°N 1.02146°W	—	Late 18th century	A red brick house with a modillion eaves cornice and a pantile roof. There are three storeys and three bays. The doorway in the left bay has a stone architrave, a rectangular fanlight, and a cornice on scrolled consoles. The windows in the lower two floors are sashes, and in the top floor they are casements.	II
Equity House; 53.43050°N 1.02090°W	—	Late 18th century	A house later used for other purposes, it is in red brick on a rendered plinth, with string courses, dentilled eaves, and a hipped roof in Welsh slate and pantile. There are three storeys and five bays. On the centre is a blocked doorway flanked by 20th-century shop fronts. The upper floors contain sash windows with cambered heads.	II
Former Granby Hotel; 53.43072°N 1.02019°W		Late 18th century	The public house, which has had changes of name, is in painted brick, with dentilled eaves, and a pantile roof, hipped on the right. There are three storeys, three bays on the front, and one bay on the right return. In the ground floor is a doorway with a pediment and three bow windows, and the upper floors contain sash windows.	II
No. 1 Yorkshire; 53.42721°N 1.02176°W		Late 18th century	The house is in red brick on a rendered plinth, with modillion eaves and a hipped pantile roof. There are three storeys, three bays, a rear wing on the left, and a two-storey addition in the angle. The central doorway has fluted Doric pilasters, a fanlight with intersecting glazing bars, a fluted frieze with oval paterae, and a dentilled cornice. The windows in the lower two floors are sashes in wooden architraves, and in the top floor they are casements. On the right return is a canted bay window with a fluted frieze and a dentilled cornice.	II
Bawtry Hall; 53.42870°N 1.02216°W		1780–85	A large house that was extended in about 1905, it is in red brick with stone dressings and a slate roof. There are two storeys and an attic, an entrance front of seven bays, the outer bays projecting, a garden front of eight bays, and a rear wing incorporating a water tower. The entrance front has floor and sill bands, a modillion cornice, and a coped parapet, and over the middle three bays is a pediment. In the centre of the front is a tetrastyle Tuscan porch with pilasters, an entablature, and a pediment, and above it is a recessed round arch. The windows are sashes, those in the upper floor with balustraded aprons. In the south front is a portico flanked by two-storey canted bay windows.	II*
1 and 3 Swan Street; 53.42887°N 1.02079°W		c. 1800	A pair of houses later extended to the left and used as shops. They are in red brick with dentilled eaves, and roofs of tile and pantile. The original houses have three storeys and two bays each, and the extension has two storeys and an attic, and two bays. No. 1 has a round-headed doorway with attached fluted columns, a semicircular fanlight, and a dentilled curved pediment, and to the right is a shop window. In the extension is a doorway combined with a shop window, and the doorway to No. 3 has fluted pilasters, and a cornice on consoles. Most of the windows are sashes, and in the attic of the extension is a three-light window with a cornice on consoles.	II
2 and 4 Swan Street; 53.42876°N 1.02091°W	—	c. 1800	Two houses, later shops, they are in red brick with floor bands and a tile roof. No. 2 has two storeys and five bays, and No. 4, to the left, has two storeys and an attic, and one bay. There is a central doorway with a fanlight to No. 2, flanked by three-light shop windows, and to the right is a doorway converted into a window, with a three-light fanlight. No. 4 has a shop front with a bow window in the ground floor, a casement window in the upper floor, and a dormer in the attic.	II
5 Swan Street; 53.42880°N 1.02054°W		c. 1800	A house later used for other purposes, it is in roughcast brick, with dentilled eaves, and a tile roof. There are three storeys and two bays. The central doorway has pilasters, a rectangular fanlight, and a cornice on consoles, and the windows are sashes.	II
Dovecote and stable block behind 9 Swan Street; 53.42887°N 1.02019°W	—	c. 1800	The dovecote and stable block, later used for other purposes, are in red brick with an asbestos sheet roof. The dovecote has three storeys and one bay, and is flanked by two-storey links to two-storey projecting wings. The dovecote has a central doorway with a fanlight and a wedge lintel. Above it is a band, a lunette, a casement window, a dentilled band, and a gable containing a blind oculus. In the wings are garage doors, doorways, a loading door and casement windows.	II
Double barn, Hall Farm; 53.43007°N 1.02319°W	—	c. 1800	The barn is in red brick with an asbestos sheet roof, two storeys and twelve bays. It contains segmental-arched wagon entries, doorways, pitching holes, and a lozenge-shaped vent. The gable ends have dentilled pediments, gable copings, and round-arched recesses with brick ledges and pigeon holes.	II
Bank House; 53.43023°N 1.02030°W		Late 18th to early 19th century	A house, later offices, it is in roughcast brick on a plinth, with quoins, a floor band, an eaves cornice and blocking course, and a hipped Westmorland slate roof. There are three storeys, a front of two bays, and a lower rear wing. On the front, the ground floor contains two bow windows, each with a plain frieze and a cornice. All the windows on the front are tripartite sashes with panelled mullions. The doorway is in the right return, and has a panelled surround, sunken spandrels, and a cornice. In the rear wing is a two-storey canted bay window, and a pedimented gable.	II
Former Wesleyan Chapel; 53.42973°N 1.01918°W	—	1808	The former chapel, which was enlarged in 1827, is red brick with a Welsh slate roof. There are two storeys and a pedimented front of three bays. In the centre is a doorway with a five-light blind fanlight, and the windows are sashes.	II
Headstone to Martha Brewerton; 53.42988°N 1.01829°W	—	1818	The headstone is in the churchyard of St Nicholas' Church, and is to the memory of Martha Brewerton. It is in magnesian limestone, and consists of a column with an oval section, a moulded base, an inscription, and a gadrooned cap.	II
3, 5, 7, 9 and 11 Doncaster Road; 53.43161°N 1.02088°W		Early 19th century	A row of five cottages in red brick, with stone slate eaves courses, dentilled eaves, and a hipped pantile roof. There are two storeys and six bays. The doorways and the windows, which are horizontally-sliding sashes, have segmental heads.	II
1 and 2 Harworth Place; 53.43080°N 1.02237°W	—	Early 19th century	A roughcast brick house on a plinth, with quoins, a patterned eaves cornice, and a slate roof, hipped on the left. There are three storeys and four bays. The doorway in the third bay has a fanlight with intersecting glazing, and the windows are sashes. At the rear is a canted projection and a trellised porch. There is a French window, and the other windows are a mix of sashes and casements.	II
3–6 Harworth Place; 53.43100°N 1.02232°W	—	Early 19th century	A row of four houses in roughcast brick with a pantile roof. There are two storeys and an attic, and ten bays. The three doorways have three-light fanlights, and the two left doorways have peaked canopies. Between these doorways is a segmental-arched passageway. The house on the right has two square bay windows with moulded sills and bracketed cornices, and the other windows are sashes.	II
16 and 18 High Street; 53.42930°N 1.02082°W	—	Early 19th century	A house, later a shop with a flat above, it is in rendered brick, with a moulded eaves band, a blocking course, and a hipped tile roof. There are three storeys and three bays, with a modern shop front in the ground floor. In the centre of the middle floor is a segmental-arched recess containing a sash window with an architrave and a cornice. In the outer bays are tripartite sash windows with friezes and cornices, and the top floor contains three sash windows.	II
6 and 8 Swan Street; 53.42872°N 1.02073°W	—	Early 19th century	A pair of houses, later shops, they are in red brick with dentilled eaves and a tile roof. There are three storeys, and each shop has two bays. No. 6 has a shop doorway with a three-light rectangular fanlight, a shop window to the right, and an entrance doorway to the left with a rectangular fanlight and intersecting tracery. No. 8 has a tripartite shop front with a central door, and to the left is a round-headed entrance doorway with a semicircular fanlight. The upper floors contain sash windows.	II
Bawtry Bridge; 53.42678°N 1.01440°W		Early 19th century	The bridge, which was widened in 1940, carries Gainsborough Road (A631 road) over the River Idle. It is in stone, and consists of three rusticated arches with keystones. The cutwaters rise to coped piers, the parapet is also coped, and it ends in coped piers on triangular bases.	II
Dower House Restaurant; 53.42897°N 1.02156°W		Early 19th century	A house, later a restaurant, in roughcast brick, with an eaves cornice, and a hipped tile roof. There are three storeys, three bays, a two-storey left wing, and a rear wing on the left. On the ground floor is a canted bay window, the other windows in the lower two floors are sashes, and the top floor contains casement windows.	II
Leigh House; 53.43023°N 1.01929°W		Early 19th century	The house is in red brick on a plinth with a hipped Welsh slate roof. There are three storeys and a symmetrical front of three bays. The central doorway has a semicircular fanlight, reeded pilasters, sunken spandrels, and a cornice. This is flanked by bow windows with friezez and cornices, and in the upper floors are sash windows.	II
Pinfold; 53.43164°N 1.02018°W	—	Early 19th century (probable)	The former pinfold is a D-shaped enclosure surrounded by walls of magnesian limestone with sandstone dressings. The wall is about 1 metre (3 ft 3 in) high, and has an entrance flanked by sandstone gate piers with domed copings.	II
Wharf Farmhouse; 53.43021°N 1.01822°W		Early 19th century	The house is in rendered brick, with dentilled eaves, and a Welsh slate roof. There are two storeys, three bays, a rear outshut, and a lower rear wing. The central doorway has a segmental head and a fanlight, and is flanked by bow windows. In the upper floor are sash windows in wooden architraves.	II
Coach house and stable behind Grove House; 53.43069°N 1.01938°W	—	Early to mid 19th century	The coach house and stable, later converted for residential use, are in red brick with a sill band, dentilled eaves, and a hipped roof in pantile and slate. There are two storeys and three bays. In the centre is a cart entry with a basket arch, a quoined surround, and voussoirs. The windows are casements with segmental arches.	II
Masonic Hall; 53.43025°N 1.02290°W		1839	Originally the Chapel of the Hospital of St. Mary Magdalene, and later a Masonic Hall, it is rendered on a chamfered plinth, and has a Welsh slate roof with gable copings and corbelled kneelers. There are four bays, consisting of a combined nave and chancel. In the right bay is a doorway with a pointed arch and a hood mould, over which is a panel with an inscribed scroll, and the other bays contain lancet windows with hood moulds. On the west gable is a bellcote, and on the east gable is a cross finial. At the east end is a three-light window with a hood mould, and to the left is an image niche with an ornamental canopy.	II
Iron gate, Masonic Hall; 53.43034°N 1.02294°W	—	1839 (probable)	The gateway at the entrance to the grounds of the hall is in wrought and cast iron, and consists of double pedestrian gates. The piers have a square base, moulded ornaments, and entablature blocks with fluted friezes and finials. At the top of the gates is scrollwork, and above them is an overthrow.	II
14 Swan Street; 53.42856°N 1.02021°W	—	Mid 19th century	A house in red brick, with dentilled eaves, and a roof of Welsh slate and pantile. There are three storeys, a symmetrical front of three bays, and a two-storey rear wing. The central doorway has pilasters, a rectangular fanlight, and a cornice on scrolled consoles. The windows in the lower two floors are sashes, and in the top floor they are casements.	II
Milepost; 53.44018°N 1.02163°W		1858	The milepost is on the east side of The Great North Road (A638 road). It is in cast iron, and has a triangular plan with angled round-headed panels. On the panels is raised lettering giving the distances to London, Bawtry, York and Doncaster; the names of the places are abbreviated.	II
War memorial 53.43200°N 1.02148°W	—	Before 1929	The war memorial is in front of the library. It is in limestone and consists of a tall tapering Latin cross with a gablet. The cross stands on a square plinth with chamfered corners, on an octagonal base. On the plinth are inscriptions, and the names of those lost in the two World Wars, and there is another inscription on the base.	II
