= Fairfax & Favor =

British luxury lifestyle brand

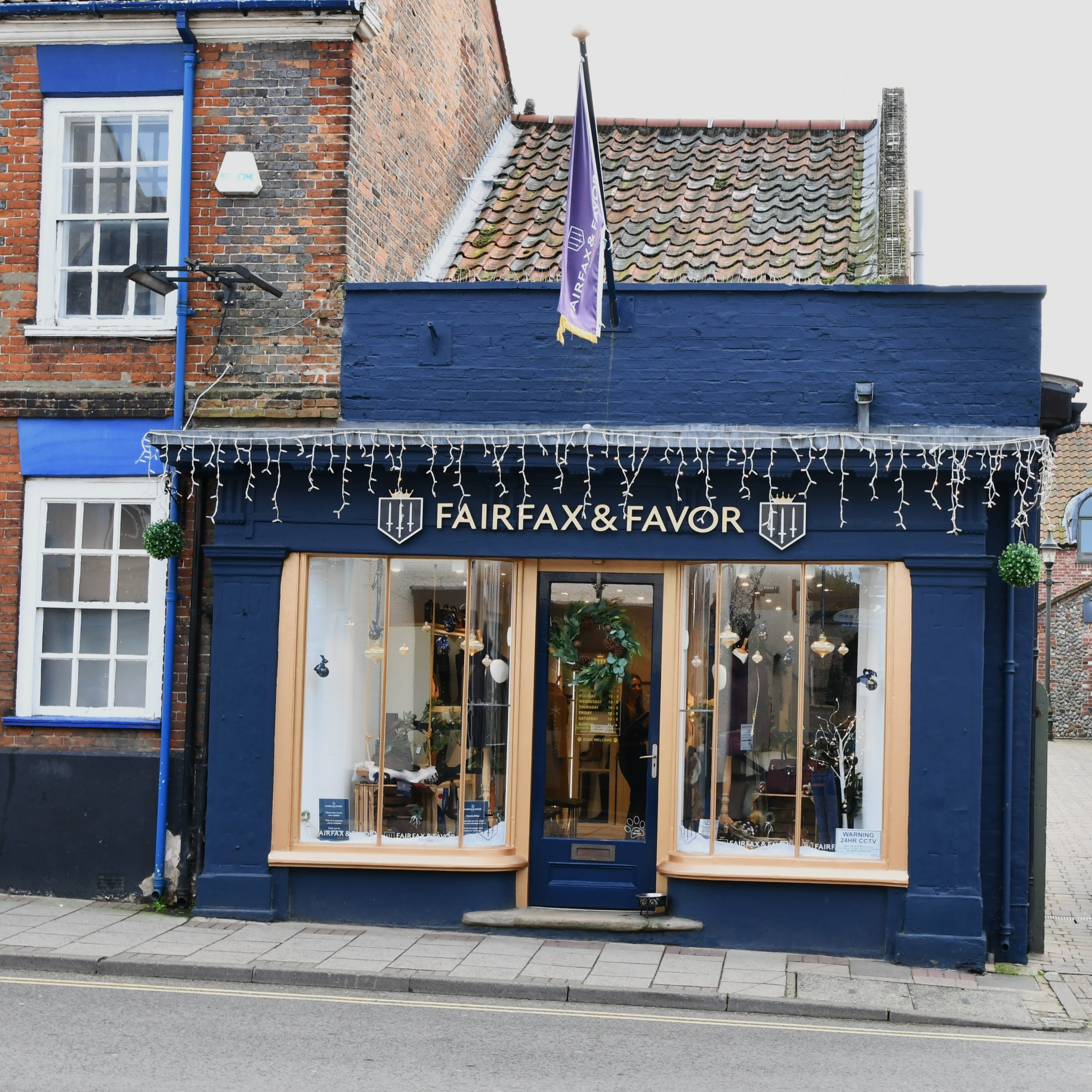
- Branch in Holt, Norfolk
- Type: Private
- Industry: Fashion
- Founded: 2013
- Headquarters: Narford Hall, Kings Lynn, Norfolk, England
- Key people: Marcus Fairfax Fountaine; Felix Favor Parker
- Website: fairfaxandfavor.com

Fairfax & Favor is a British luxury lifestyle brand based in Norfolk, UK. It has six stores in the United Kingdom.

== Overview ==
Fairfax & Favor was founded by two childhood friends, Marcus Fairfax Fountaine and Felix Favor Parker, in 2013. The company opened its first store in Holt, England, in 2019. As of 2026, it has nine stores in the United Kingdom located in Bakewell, Bawtry, Helmsley, Holt, Marlow, Shaftesbury, Southwold, Stamford, and Stow-on-the-Wold. In 2023, they opened a US store in Tyron, North Carolina at the Tryon International Equestrian Center.

Fairfax & Favor primarily began to create fashion footwear for rural areas in the United Kingdom. Later, it started selling fashion apparel, bags, belts, and other accessories. In 2021, the company was named one of the fastest-growing companies in the United Kingdom by Eastern Daily Press. Fairfax & Favor also won the Drapers Footwear Award twice, first in 2020, and then in 2023. In 2023, it was included in the list of the 100 fastest-growing companies in Britain by The Sunday Times.

The company partners with businesses and non-profit organisations. In 2021, Fairfax & Favor collaborated with Le Chameau and launched the L’Alliance Wellington Boot Limited Edition. It has been participating in supporting a non-profit organisation, Breast Cancer Now, since 2014. As of 2023, Fairfax & Favor raised over £400,000 for the non-profit organisation from its Pink category products.
