= Bawtry gasworks contamination =

English industrial contamination litigation

Coordinates: 53.4278°N 1.0167°W

Bawtry shown within South Yorkshire.

In 2001, an area of residential land in Bawtry, South Yorkshire, England was found to contain hazardous by-products from the manufacture of coal gas. Under the Environmental Protection Act 1990, decontamination was held to be the responsibility of National Grid Gas (NGG), even though the negligence may have dated back before the 1948 nationalisation.

This decision could have left NGG liable for thousands of similar cases, and would have discouraged beneficial development of brownfield sites. On appeal, the House of Lords ruled that NGG did not knowingly permit the pollution, and therefore could not be held accountable.

== Background ==
Bawtry Gasworks, operated by the Bawtry and District Gas Company, was founded in 1834 and began manufacturing coal gas in 1915. The process involved the destructive distillation of coal, and the by-products included coke, coal tar, sulphur and ammonia. The disposal of the coal tar was by burying in brick-lined pits, which were then backfilled. In 1931, it was taken over by South Yorkshire and Derbyshire Gas Company, and as part of a nationalisation programme under the Gas Act 1948, the site – including the rights and liabilities from the previous owners – was subsequently transferred to East Midlands Gas Board (EMGB). The manufacture of gas ceased in 1952 and it was later used for storage and distribution purposes. The increasing use of natural gas in the 1960s led to the closure of the works and its sale to Kenton Homes Ltd. in 1965. It was sold again, still undeveloped, in 1966 to Kenneth Jackson Ltd. who obtained planning permission to build 11 houses there. Before erecting the houses, the builder was aware of the presence of the coal tar beneath the site and in the soil, and the details of the sale described the site as including "the underground tanks installed on part thereof."

The Gas Act 1972 further reorganised the industry and EMGB's liabilities passed to the British Gas Corporation (BGC), while the Gas Act 1986 subsequently transferred them from the BGC to British Gas plc. Restructuring in 1997, split British Gas plc into BG plc and Centrica, and BG plc then de-merged into BG and Lattice Group. In 2002, Lattice Group merged with National Grid, creating National Grid Transco, which in 2005 split again to form National Grid plc and Transco plc. Transco was later renamed National Grid Gas.

== Decontamination ==
In October 2001, a resident of Ivatt Close, Bawtry, uncovered a coal tar pit, covered by wooden boards and a layer of soil, in his back garden. An investigation by Doncaster Metropolitan Borough Council determined that the contamination also included nickel and affected parts of two adjacent streets, Stirling Avenue and Gresley Avenue. In total, 47 properties were found to be contaminated to some extent. The presence of a major aquifer beneath the site, its situation within a Groundwater Source Protection Zone and the potential for groundwater contamination, led to it being designated a 'special site' under the EPA in June 2003 and enforcement of the Act, therefore, passed from the local authority to the EA.

The decontamination and remediation work was funded at public expense, and involved the identification and removal of further tar pits and contaminated soil to a depth of 0.6m, the installation of a separating membrane and backfilling and landscaping with replacement soil. The work was completed in 2006.

== Litigation ==
=== Appropriate person ===
Having carried out the remediation work, the EA, under the provisions of the EPA, sought to reclaim £695,782 towards the costs of the work. This represented approximately 50% of the costs and had been paid by a grant from the Department for Environment, Food and Rural Affairs. Although it was not known exactly when the coal tar was buried at the site, it was "probable that most of this happened when the site was in private ownership before nationalisation, but some part may have happened while the site was owned by the EMGB." Part IIA of the EPA allows for the "determination of the appropriate person to bear responsibility for remediation" and allows a remediation notice to be served. The person served then has a statutory obligation to comply with the notice and carry out the specified remediation works, although in some cases, such as those involving 'special sites' and urgent work, the agency can itself carry out the remediation works and later recover its costs from the "appropriate person" or persons. The agency also has the discretion to decide not to recover its costs from a particular appropriate person where this would be deemed to cause hardship.

In identifying the appropriate person, the EPA states that liability first rests with those who "caused or knowingly permitted the contamination," who are known as "Class A appropriate persons". If no Class A appropriate persons can be found, then liability passes to the owners or occupiers of the land, even when those persons were not directly responsible for the contamination or were unaware of its existence. These are known as "Class B appropriate persons." In the Bawtry case, the EA identified the gas industry, Kenton Homes Ltd. and Kenneth Jackson Ltd. as potential Class A appropriate persons. The owners/occupiers of the properties would have been liable as Class B appropriate persons but the EA had already decided that the costs of the remediation would have caused these individuals considerable hardship and that they would not pursue them. As both building firms had been dissolved, Kenton in 1983 and Jackson in 1993, the only party left to pursue was Transco, who applied for a judicial review at the High Court of the EA's decision of 13 September 2005 to name them as Class A appropriate persons.

=== Judicial review ===
In the High Court, Transco argued that the decision should be quashed on the following points:

- Transco had not itself "caused or knowingly permitted the contamination" and so could not be an "appropriate person" within the meaning of the Act
- Transco was a separate and different legal personality from its predecessors, and so was not a "person" within the meaning of the Act
- No liability existed at the time of transfers from predecessors, as the disposal of the coal tar had been carried out at the time by what was then considered normal practice, so that no liability could have been transferred
- even if liability had existed at those times, the transfers could not have operated to transfer liabilities under Part IIA as those provisions introduced a wholly new form of liability which was not in force at the time of the transfers. The statutory provisions transferring property, rights, liabilities and obligations under the various reorganisations had referred to such liabilities as those existing "immediately before the date of transfer."

The Environment Agency argued that:

- Where an activity by a body has resulted in contaminated land, but where the identity of that body has changed due to an Act of Parliament, in this case the various Gas Acts, the aim was to "ensure continuity" and as such, the usual rules of corporate personality should not apply.

Mr. Justice Forbes upheld the EA's interpretation of "person" and, in light of Pepper v. Hart, deemed it "was permissible to consider that intent by reference to the parliamentary record... [in which] ministerial statements demonstrated that the government had expressly considered the issue of statutory successors to bodies such as British Coal and British Gas, and had intended that Part IIA liability be borne by successors." The judge acknowledged that the issue was of "considerable general importance," affecting "many sites contaminated by utility companies... which have subsequently been subject to statutory reorganisation" including about 2000 former gasworks sites where ground had been contaminated by old utility companies. Given the importance of the case, the judge agreed to allow NGG/Transco to "leapfrog" the Court of Appeal and appeal directly to the House of Lords.

NGG managing director Phil Kirby said: "We have one of the UK's largest programmes of brownfield remediation and over the past decade have helped to reclaim hundreds of acres of our own land. If this judgment were allowed to stand, it would inappropriately allocate liability and discourage brownfield land being brought back into beneficial use... We continue to work closely with the EA and provide support for its excellent work to reclaim sites such as these, where the original polluters have long since ceased to exist, but where their legacy of contamination remains."

=== Appeal ===
The appeal was heard at the House of Lords in May 2007 before Lord Hoffmann, Lord Scott of Foscote, Lord Walker of Gestingthorpe, Lord Mance and Lord Neuberger of Abbotsbury. Overturning the decision of the lower court, Lord Scott ruled that the EA's interpretation of "person" was "a quite impossible construction to place on the uncomplicated and easily understandable statutory language [which] made nonsense, also, of the language of the statutory provisions under which, upon nationalisation in 1948, the liabilities of private gas undertakers were transferred to the state-owned area boards and, upon privatisation in 1986, the liabilities of those boards were transferred to British Gas plc." These liabilities, he ruled, were expressly limited to those existing immediately before the transfer date and so could not be used to impose a liability only created by Parliament in 1995. Lord Hoffmann and Lord Neuberger delivered concurring opinions, and Lord Walker and Lord Mance agreed.

This decision was deemed to have significant implications in determining liability for historic environmental contamination and potentially placed the financial responsibility for remediation of former private commercial sites with public-funded local authorities. There are an estimated 4,000 similar sites in the UK where coal gas was once manufactured. These are potentially contaminated with carcinogenic coal tar and asbestos, phenols, sulfur compounds, cyanides and combustible substances. In 1995 Cedric Brown, the chief executive of British Gas, clashed with Labour Party MP Frank Dobson by refusing to release details of former gas works which may have been contaminated. Brown said that the information would be shared only with property speculators "with a future interest in the land". Dobson alleged that British Gas was "more interested in profiteering than in protecting the public. They are willing to tell property speculators who never go near sites, but not willing to tell local people whose children may stray on to them. Tell the truth and shame the devil. What have they got to cover up?"
