= RAF Bawtry =

Royal Air Force base in Yorkshire, England

RAF Bawtry
- Bawtry, South Yorkshire in England
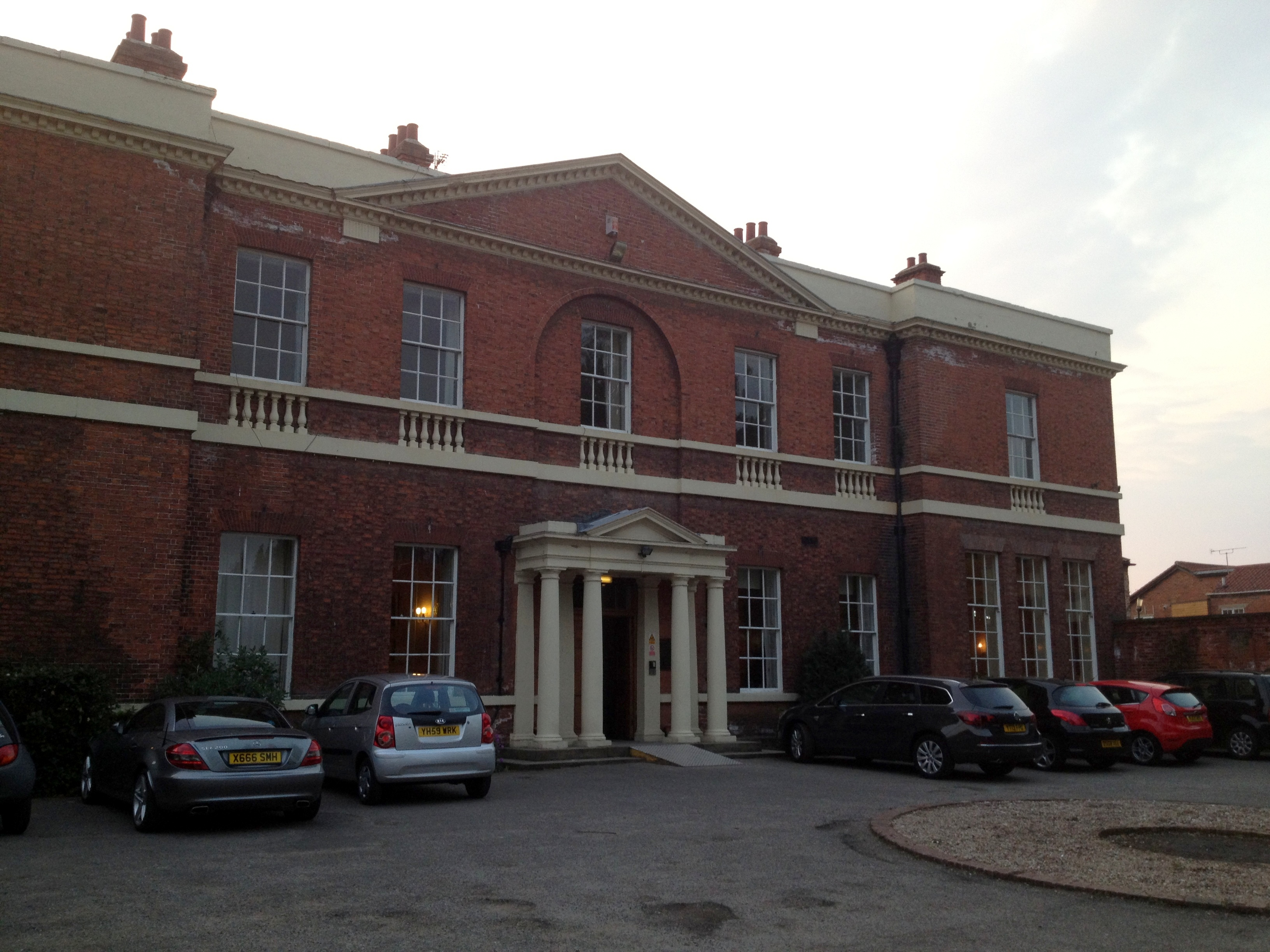
- East side of Bawtry Hall

Site information
- Owner: Ministry of Defence (United Kingdom)
- Operator: Royal Air Force
- Controlled by: RAF Bomber Command; RAF Strike Command

Location
- Coordinates: 53.4286°N 1.0226°W

Site history
- Built: 1785
- In use: 1941–1986

Garrison information
- Past commanders: David Parry-Evans (AOC 1 Gp 1982)

Royal Air Force Bawtry or more simply RAF Bawtry is a former Royal Air Force station located at Bawtry Hall in Bawtry, South Yorkshire, England and was No. 1 Group RAF Bomber Command headquarters and administration unit during and following the Second World War.

Since the RAF vacated in 1986, the hall has been used by a variety of private enterprises.

== History ==
Bawtry Hall itself is a large redbrick house in two storeys with attics which was erected around 1785 by Pemberton Milnes, a prosperous wool-merchant from Wakefield, Yorkshire. It descended in the Milnes family for several generations before being sold to Major George Peake, a well-known amateur pilot, in 1905. It is a Grade II* listed building.

During the Second World War the RAF took it over and it became an RAF command centre in July 1941. RAF Bawtry did not have its own airfield but instead took advantage of RAF Bircotes, which was located nearby. Here the station based a number of communications aircraft.

Bawtry Hall served the Royal Air Force from 1941–1984; first as HQ for No. 1 Group, Bomber Command during and after the Second World War, then as HQ No. 1 Group as part of Strike Command up to and including the later stages of the Cold War. The famous bombing of the airfield at Port Stanley by Vulcan bombers from RAF Waddington during the Falklands War was co-ordinated from the operations room at Bawtry Hall.

RAF Bawtry became the centre of the RAF Meteorological Service for many years and ceased military operations in 1986. It was purchased by the Action Partners Corporation in the late 1980s.

No. 1 Group Bomber Command units based at RAF Bawtry comprised as follows: –

Airfield .	Squadron	Aircraft Type	Number of Aircraft .
RAF Elsham Wolds	103 Sqn	Avro Lancaster I and III	17
RAF Elsham Wolds	576 Sqn	Lancaster I and III	8
RAF Kirmington	166 Sqn	Lancaster I and III	23
RAF Ingham	300 (Polish) Sqn	Vickers Wellington X	23
RAF Ingham	300 (Polish) Sqn	Lancaster I and III	0 – Re-equipping
RAF Wickenby	12 Sqn	Lancaster I and III	16
RAF Wickenby	626 Sqn	Lancaster I and III	14
RAF Grimsby	100 Sqn	Lancaster I and III	18
RAF Grimsby	550 Sqn	Lancaster I and III	7
RAF Ludford Magna	101 Sqn	Lancaster I and III	22
RAF Binbrook	460 Sqn RAAF	Lancaster I and III	27
RAF Kelstern	625 Sqn RAAF	Lancaster I and III	17

+data from:

During the Miners' Strike in the mid-1980s, police officers were based at RAF Bawtry to provide a central Operations and co-ordination point on the South Yorkshire / Nottinghamshire border.

== Present ==
The Air Training Corps 2008 Squadron is still located at the former site on Park Road in Bawtry, in a new building that replaced the former ones.

It was sold by Defence Estates in the mid 1980s to a Roger Byron-Collins company who owned Bawtry Hall for 3 years together with the nearby technical and domestic site at RAF Hemswell and the post war married quarters sites at RAF Finningley and RAF Scampton. Later the building was bought by Action Partners Corporation, a Christian organisation, and has been used as teaching and conference centre for the past 24 years.

The trustees had taken the decision to close the hall on 31 December 2013 and a buyer was being actively sought. The hall was sold in 2014 for £1.6 million to Bawtry Hall properties who would be moving various video gaming enterprises into the building.

== See also ==
- List of former Royal Air Force stations
- Grade II* listed buildings in South Yorkshire
- Listed buildings in Bawtry
