= Bawtry Wharf =

Former inland port in Yorkshire, England

- Interactive map of Bawtry Wharf
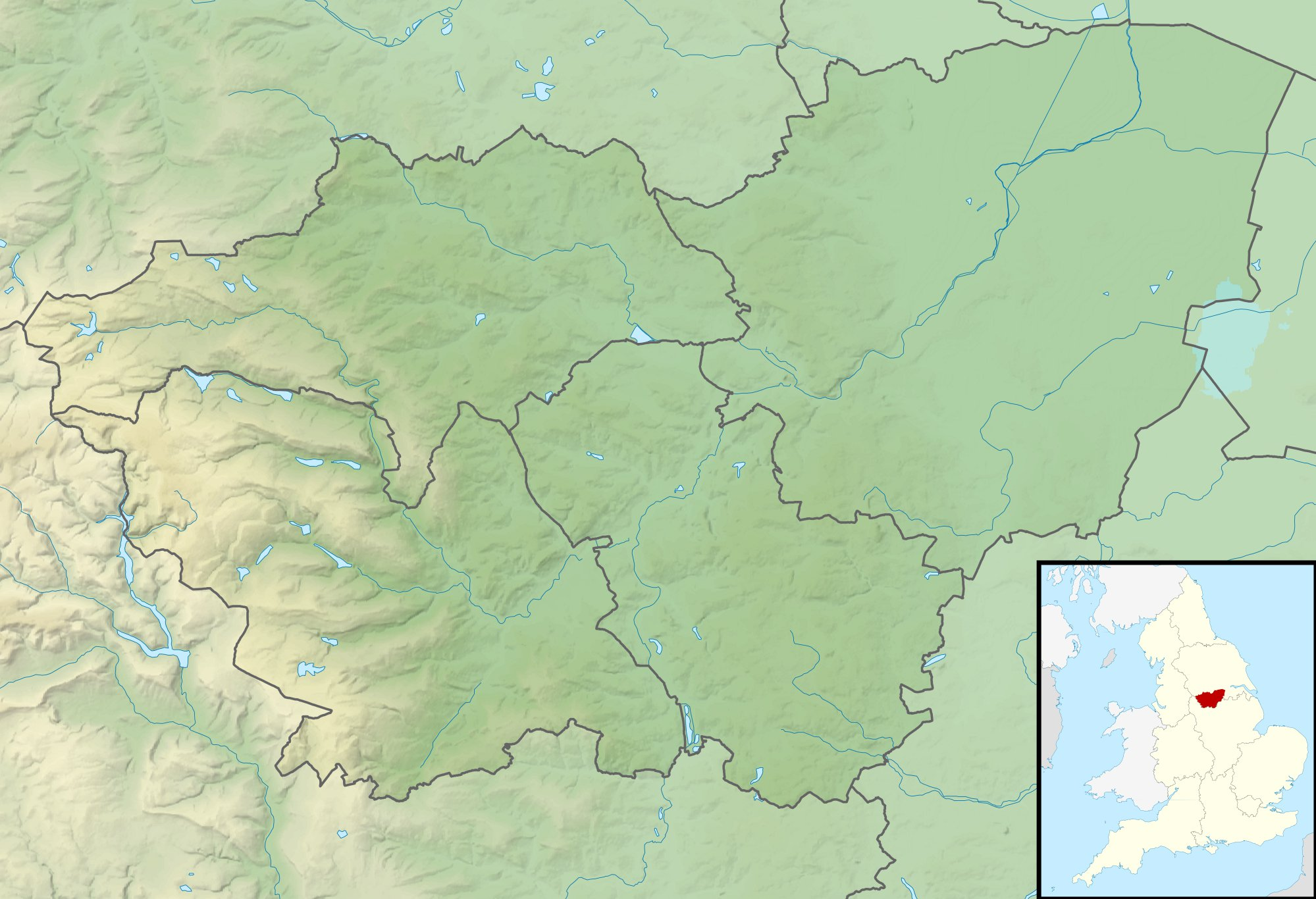
- Location in South Yorkshire

Location
- Country: England
- Location: Bawtry, West Riding of Yorkshire (modern day South Yorkshire, see note)
- Coordinates: 53.4302°N 1.0166°W
- OS Gridref: SK654930

Details
- Opened: c. 1200
- Closed: c. 1857
- Type of harbour: River Basin

Bawtry Wharf was a small medieval port in the town of Bawtry, West Riding of Yorkshire, England. (Note: Bawtry was originally in Nottinghamshire, but was moved into Yorkshire c. the 13th century. Originally in the West Riding of Yorkshire (in the wapentake of Lower Strafforth) but was moved into South Yorkshire in 1974.) The port operated from a wharf on the River Idle, a small body of water that flowed eastwards inland from Bawtry to the River Trent, and was navigable to sailing ships. Bawtry Wharf flourished as a port from the 12th century until the middle of the 19th century. Whilst the port was in a decline by the early 19th century, the building of a railway viaduct near the town necessitated diverting the River Idle which isolated the port from the main river stem, and the site silted up after losing its water.

Daniel Defoe described Bawtry port as "the centre of exportation for all of the country."

== History ==
Bawtry was first recorded in 1199, as being built on the waste (Note: An area within the Domesday Book that was described as Waste was an area that was untaxed, or unoccupied.) of Austerfield, a village to the north-east of Bawtry, which held the mother church in the area. Bawtry is described as having a port in a document from 1276, with wool and lead being its chief exports, although it is thought to have existed as a port a century back, and possibly even to Roman times. The location of the wharf was on the eastern side of the town, where the land slopes down towards the river. The position of the church in this lower part of Bawtry, suggests that the port developed before the main part of the town did, with Bawtry expanding westwards from the 13th century onwards. The port is thought to have led to some affluence in the area, and grand Georgian houses on Wharf street are said to have been built for the merchants and traders at the port. During the latter part of the 13th century, and the early part of the 14th, Bawtry recorded a river port trade commensurate with, or greater than, Beverley and Tadcaster. It was during this time that it was possibly the third busiest inland port in England. During the 13th century, consignments of wool, grain and lead were exported through Bawtry. Ports of trans-shipment included Hull and Grimsby.

Downstream from Bawtry, the river travels a distance of 10.9 miles (17.5 km) before reaching Stockwith, where it spills into the Trent. From Stockwith to the mouth of the Trent into the Humber, is 21 miles (34 km). In the 19th century, boats plying their trade along the river were typically 48 feet (15 m) long, and were able to carry loads of 12–24 tonnes (13–26 tons).

The hinterland of the port had great importance during the Second Anglo-Dutch War, as it proved to be an easy route to transport timber to the Royal Navy shipyards in the south at Chatham and Woolwich. However, a great deal of the felled timber rotted at the port of Bawtry and that at Stockwith (on the Trent, a trans-shipment point) as the organisers faced logistical challenges in exporting the commodity. Other timber carried from the port included a consignment of oak in 1695, which was floated downriver from Bawtry bound for use in St Paul's Cathedral, London. The timber originated from an estate in Welbeck, Nottinghamshire. Smaller timber went by track straight to Stockwith, but "ten long trees could not be sent by land carriage".

Daniel Defoe visited Bawtry in the 1720s and described the port as being "..on the little and pleasant River Idle [which] has become the centre of exportation for all of the country." Defoe noted that exports through the wharf were of lead from Derbyshire, pig iron from Sheffield, cloth from West Yorkshire, and Derbyshire millstones bound for Hull, London and the Netherlands. Imports consisted of iron ore, timber, groceries, copper tin, hemp, leather hides and flax. However, as the local iron ores around Sheffield had a high phosphorus percentage making them good for wrought iron, but not steel, inwards shipments of iron ore from Sweden were handled at Bawtry too. George Talbot, the Earl of Shrewsbury, owned a warehouse at Bawtry wharf and was exporting about 100 tonnes (110 tons) of lead per year, whilst also importing Spanish steel for Sheffield. The transport of lead from the Derbyshire smelters helped to accelerate road-building in the area, and many of the routes taken to Bawtry by the lead were turnpiked between 1756 and 1766. The "considerable" distance (20 miles (32 km)) and cost of transportation of goods from Sheffield to Bawtry prompted the investigation into making the River Don Navigable, which had been achieved by the middle of the 18th century and much of the traffic from Sheffield had been diverted away from Bawtry. The cost of transporting goods on the open sea via the Humber to Stockwith was 0.25d per mile, which rose to 3d for the trans-shipment and forwarding to Bawtry, and then it cost 10d by road to the Sheffield area.

An act was passed in 1719 (under George I), to make the river from Bawtry southwards to East Retford navigable. The burgesses and wharf owners in Bawtry did not object to this act, whereas they had done to proposed acts for improving the rivers to other inland ports such as Doncaster and those on the River Derwent, though there is some doubt as to whether the act was carried out. In the 1830s, coal was being forwarded in to feed the gasworks adjacent to the wharf basin, and one of the wharf-keepers was running a passenger steam-packet service to Gainsborough.

Traffic through the port started to decrease in the 1760s when the River Don was canalised to Rotherham, Tinsley and finally Sheffield. Previously, metal products from Sheffield and Hallamshire had been exported through Bawtry. The Chesterfield Canal was also a factor in Bawtry's demise; it opened in 1777, and ran via Retford straight to Stockwith, cutting out Bawtry completely, although early surveys initially called for a waterway that connected into the River Idle at Bawtry. As the maritime trade and traffic was declining, the importance of Bawtry as a coaching town on the Great North Road was gaining significant trade.

Although the port was in a long slow decline by the arrival of the railways (it was described as being "inconsiderable" in 1813), the waters of the River Idle were diverted away from the town in 1857 when the Great Northern Railway built a stone viaduct across the marshy ground to the east of Bawtry (replacing an earlier wooden one). At the same time they dug a new cut for the river, a straight channel 980 feet (300 m) to the east, which bypassed the wharf. The right of navigation on the Idle still exists as far upstream as Bawtry, and a warehouse likely to have been a storage area for the port still exists on Wharf Street.
