= Bawtry =

Market town in South Yorkshire, England

Coordinates: 53.4278°N 1.0167°W

- Town
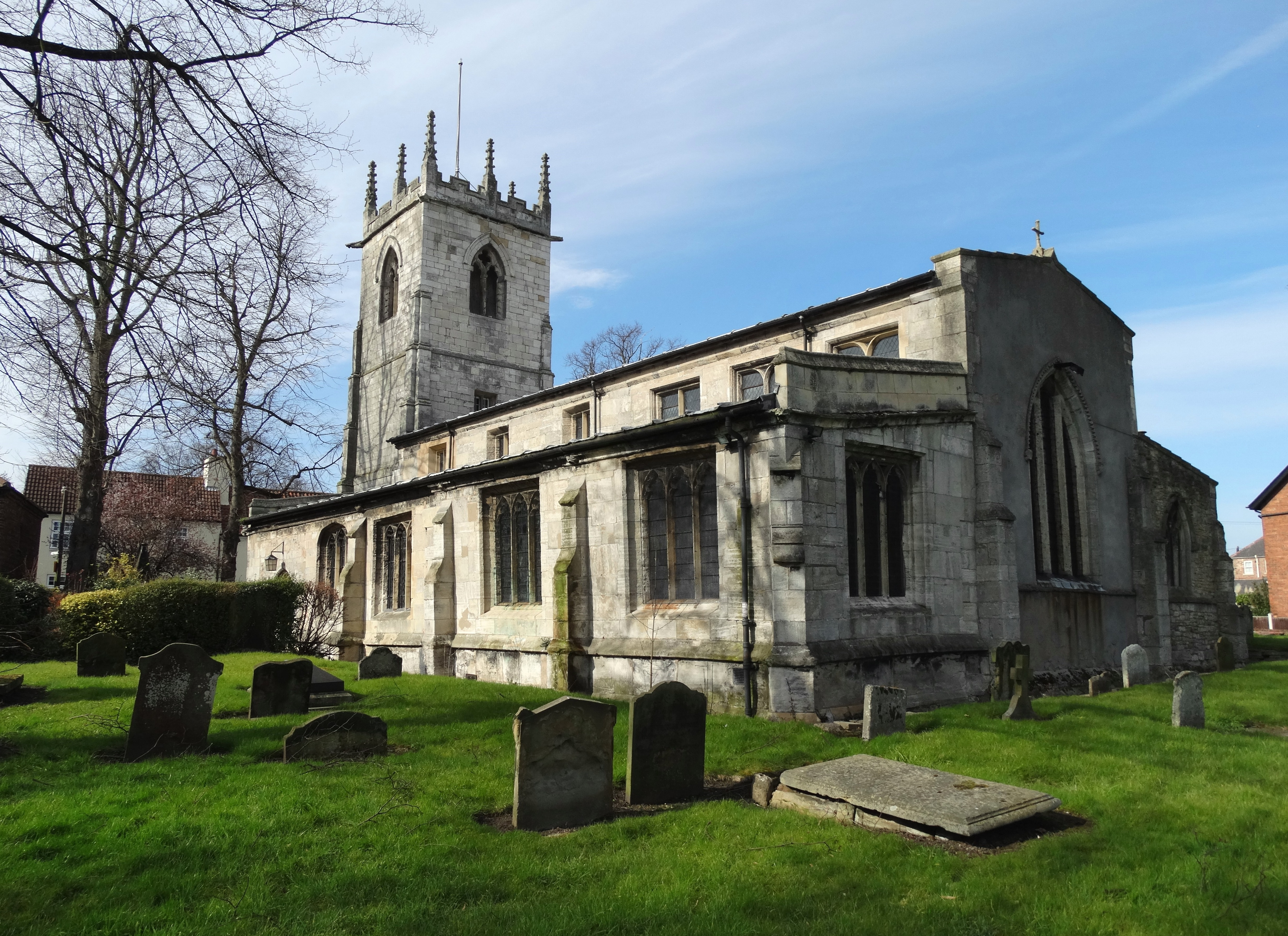
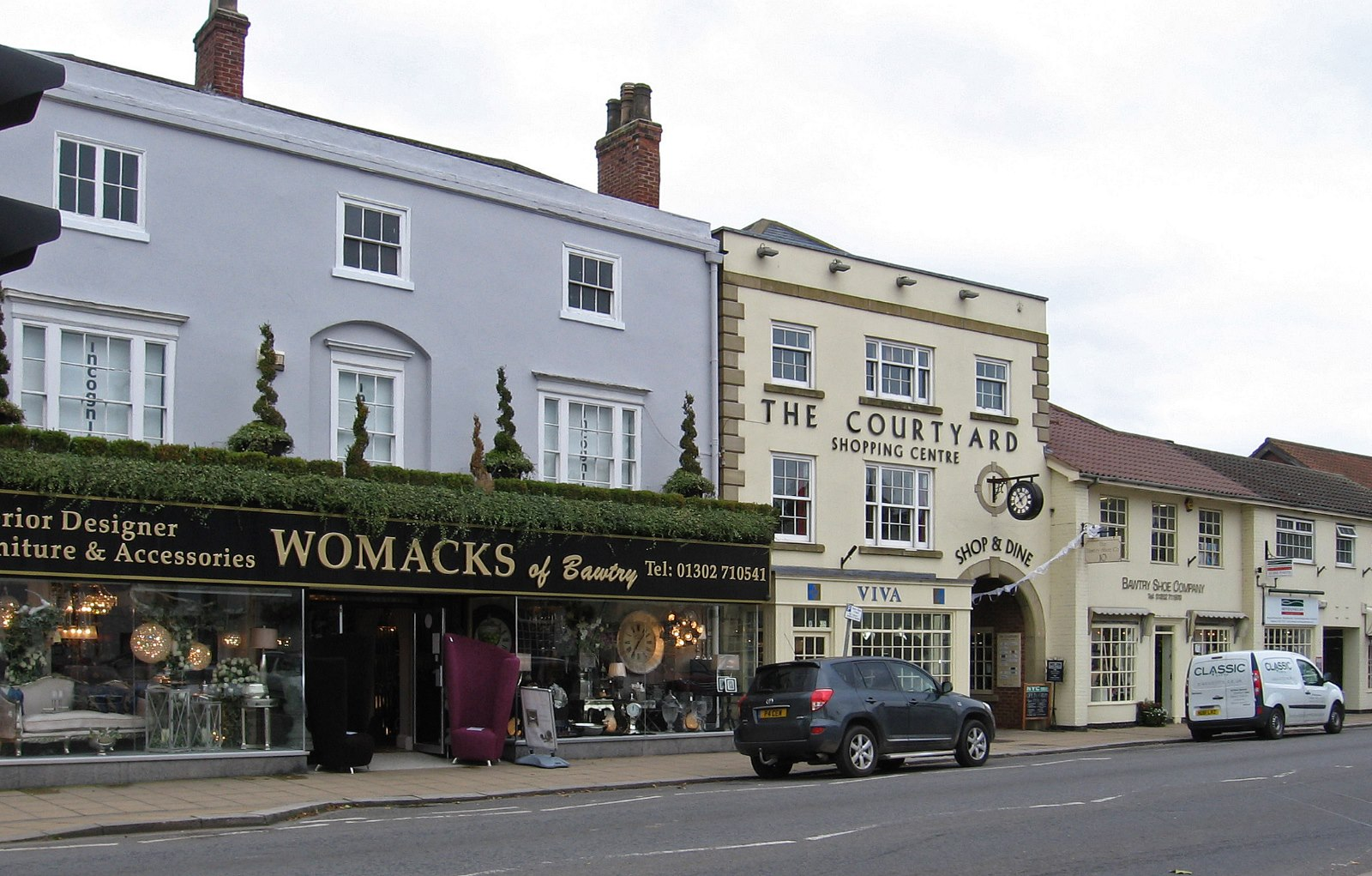
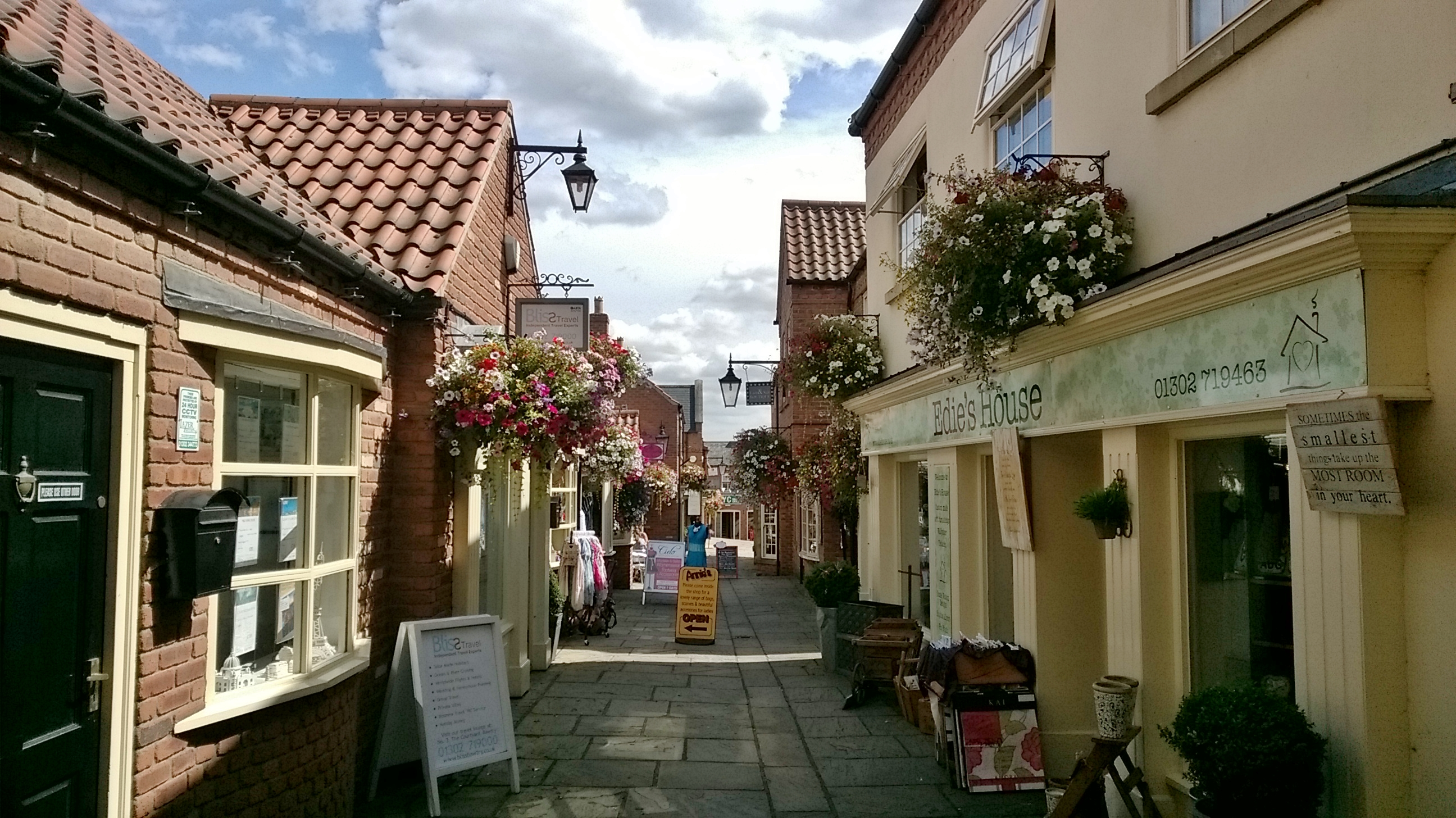
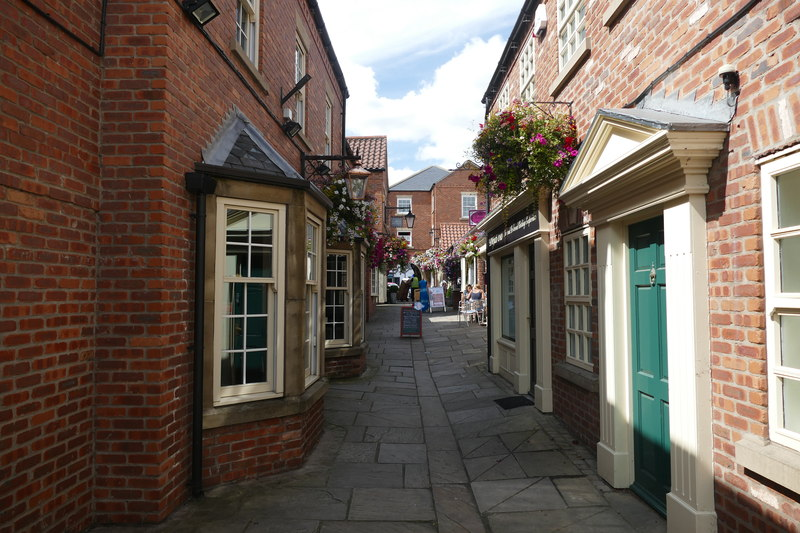
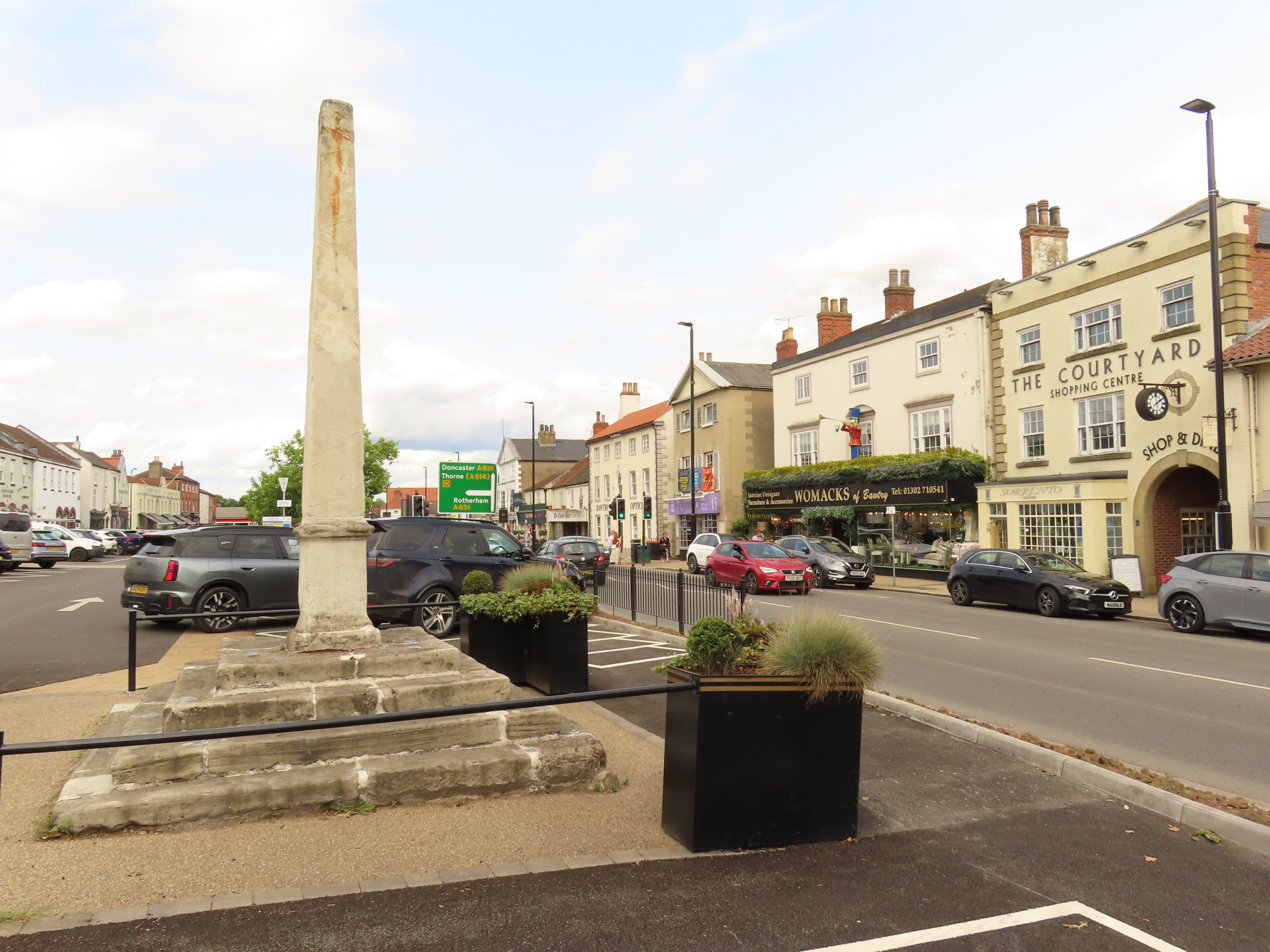
- St Nicholas's Church High Street Church Walk Swan Street Market Cross

- Location within City of Doncaster Location within South Yorkshire
- Population: 3,573 (2011 census)
- OS grid reference: SK6593
- Civil parish: Bawtry
- Metropolitan borough: City of Doncaster
- Metropolitan county: South Yorkshire
- Region: Yorkshire and the Humber
- Country: England
- Sovereign state: United Kingdom
- Post town: Doncaster
- Postcode district: DN10
- Dialling code: 01302
- Police: South Yorkshire
- Fire: South Yorkshire
- Ambulance: Yorkshire
- UK Parliament: Doncaster East and the Isle of Axholme

Bawtry (/ˈbɔtrɪ/) is a market town and civil parish in the City of Doncaster in South Yorkshire, England. It lies 8 miles (13 km) south-east of Doncaster, 10 miles (16 km) west of Gainsborough and 8 miles (13 km) north-west of Retford, on the border with Nottinghamshire and close to Lincolnshire. The town was historically divided between the West Riding of Yorkshire and Nottinghamshire. Its population of 3,204 in the 2001 UK census increased to 3,573 in 2011, and was put at 3,519 in 2019. Nearby settlements include Austerfield, Everton, Scrooby, Blyth, Bircotes and Tickhill.

== History ==
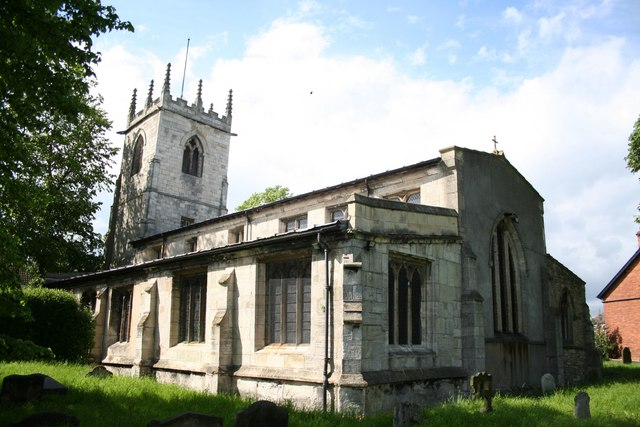
St Nicholas' Church is the parish church of Bawtry.

The origin of the name "Bawtry" is uncertain, but it is thought to contain the Old English words ball ("ball") and trēow ("tree"), so meaning it was a "(place at) ball-shaped tree". It was not mentioned in the Domesday Book, but it appears as Baltry in 1199 and as Bautre on a 1677 map.

Bawtry was originally the site of a Roman settlement on Ermine Street between Doncaster and Lincoln. In 616 AD, the Anglo-Saxon King Aethelfrith died in battle against Raedwald, King of East Anglia, by the River Idle at Bawtry. The site in Aethelfrith's time lay in the southern reaches of Northumbria, a dangerous marshy region close to the border with Lindsey and easily accessible from the Kingdom of East Anglia.

A settlement developed here around a wharf in the Danelaw era. Evidence suggests that St Nicholas's Church was first erected in that period. While the village originally lay in Nottinghamshire, boundary changes before the Norman conquest moved it just inside the West Riding of Yorkshire.

Around 1200, a new town was developed adjacent to the older village, under the auspices of John de Busli or Robert de Vipont. In 1213, de Vipont received a royal charter specifying an annual four-day fair at Pentecost, and a market was first recorded in 1247. The town grew as a river port and as a local commercial centre and stopping point between Doncaster and Retford. By the mid-14th century, the port was exporting wool and other items overseas. Meanwhile, the Hospital of St Mary Magdalene was founded, which survived until the 18th century.

Trading in Bawtry later declined and by the 1540s John Leland recorded it as being "very bare and pore", but it grew again in the Elizabethan period through the shipping of millstones.

Bawtry Hall was the base for RAF No.1 Group Bomber Command during and after the Second World War, and became the headquarters of RAF Strike Command (see RAF Bawtry).

== Geography ==
Bawtry is where the western branch of the Roman Ermine Street crosses the River Idle in the Metropolitan Borough of Doncaster, South Yorkshire. It straddles the A638 road, previously the Great North Road.

Nearby towns include Gainsborough to the east, Retford to the south-southeast, Worksop to the south-west and Doncaster to the north-west. The town is just south of Doncaster Sheffield Airport, formerly RAF Finningley, and between Bircotes and Misson at the conjunction of the A614, A631 and A638. In the 20th century Bawtry became a bottleneck, until a bypass was eventually built in 1965. The county boundary with Nottinghamshire runs just to the south of the town – the southernmost house on the Great North Road names itself "Number One Yorkshire".

The town's former prosperity was based on communications: the River Idle when it was a port, the Great North Road in the coaching era, and the Great Northern Railway. Its geographical location is 53° 25' 40" North, 1° 1' West, at an elevation of some 37 feet (11.4 m) above sea level.

== Media ==
Local news and television programmes are provided by BBC Yorkshire and ITV Yorkshire (West). Television signals are received from the Emley Moor TV transmitter. The Belmont TV transmitter can also be received which broadcast BBC Yorkshire and Lincolnshire and ITV Yorkshire (East). Local radio stations are BBC Radio Sheffield, Heart Yorkshire, Capital Yorkshire, Hits Radio South Yorkshire, Sine FM, Greatest Hits Radio South Yorkshire, and TX1 Radio. The town is served by local newspaper, Doncaster Free Press.

== Community facilities ==
Bawtry has a school called Bawtry Mayflower School named after the vessel Mayflower, which took William Bradford, leader of the Pilgrims, to the Americas, settling the first Plymouth Colony. Bradford came from Austerfield, about a mile from Bawtry.

The White Hart in Swan Street is the town's oldest surviving public house, dating from 1689. The older Swan Inn in the same street has been converted to other uses. Market Hill and High Street contain buildings of the same period, interspersed with more recent ones. The Crown Hotel in High Street was once a coaching inn.

The Old Town Hall was completed in 1890.

South Parade is a terrace of Georgian houses. The Courtyard, a modern development of housing, shops and businesses, won the Green Apple Awards 2005.

From 1989 to 2013 Bawtry Hall operated as a Christian conference centre and a base for several Christian bodies. It now serves for a wider range of events such as wedding receptions.

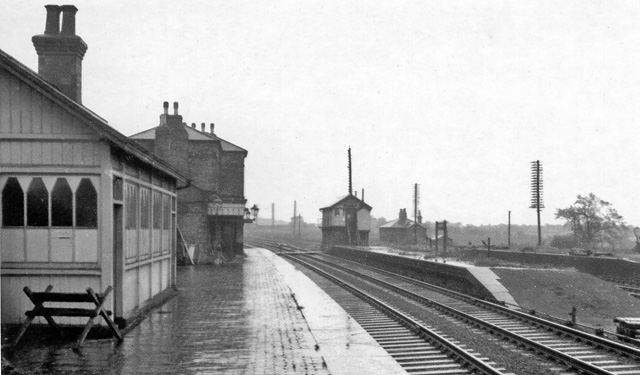
The former railway station during its heyday

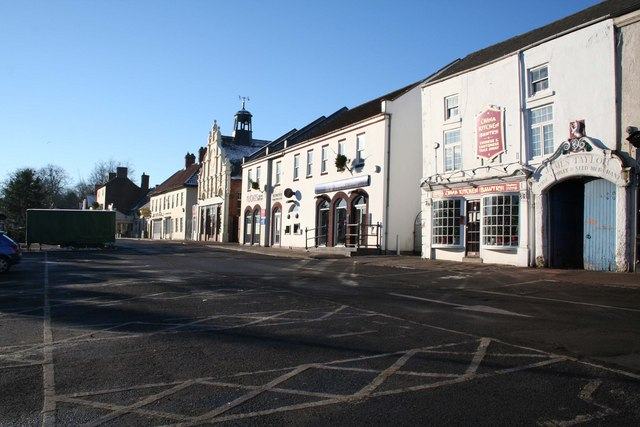
Bawtry Market Place and the former Great North Road

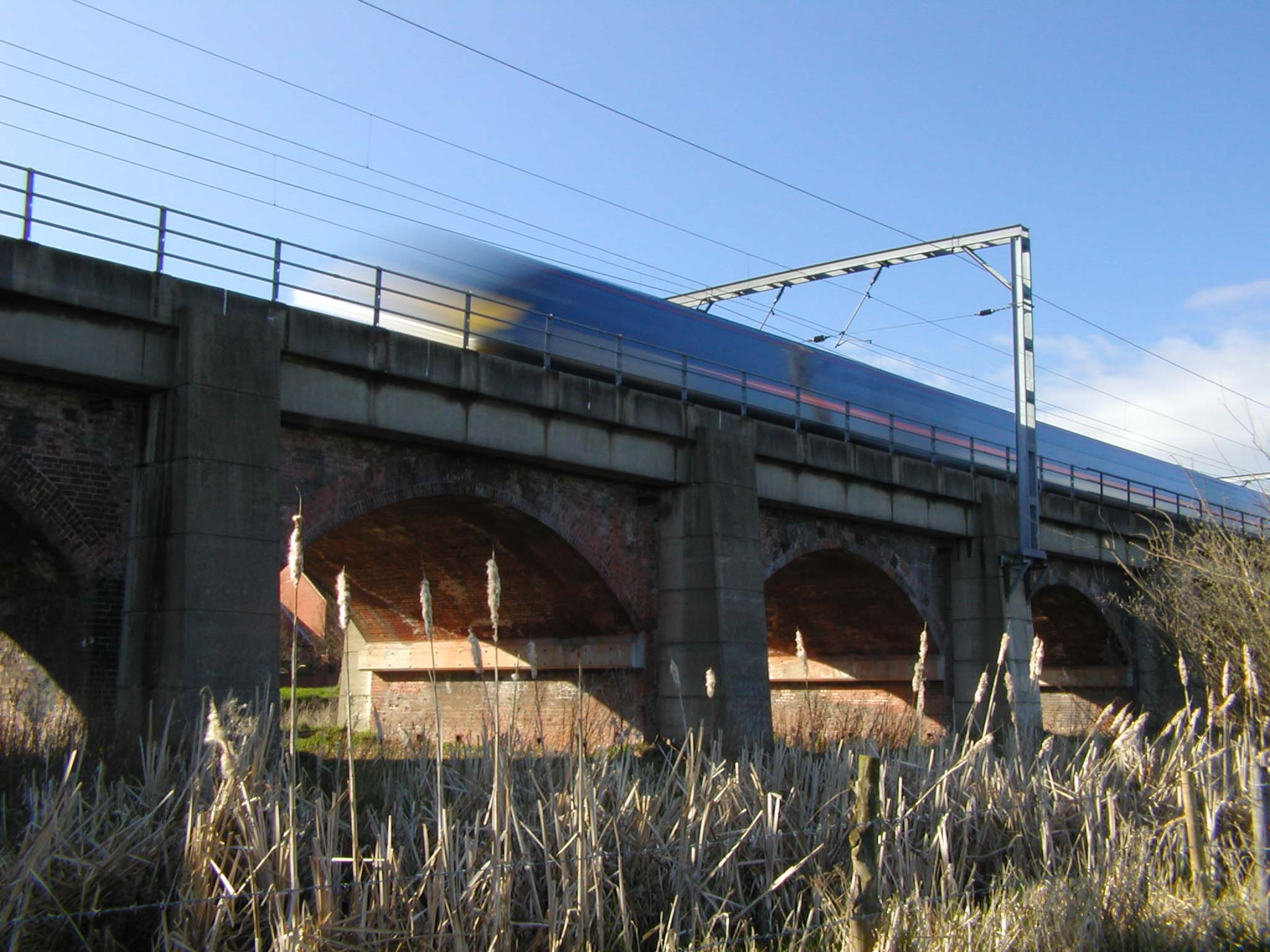
A GNER train heading south over Bawtry viaduct

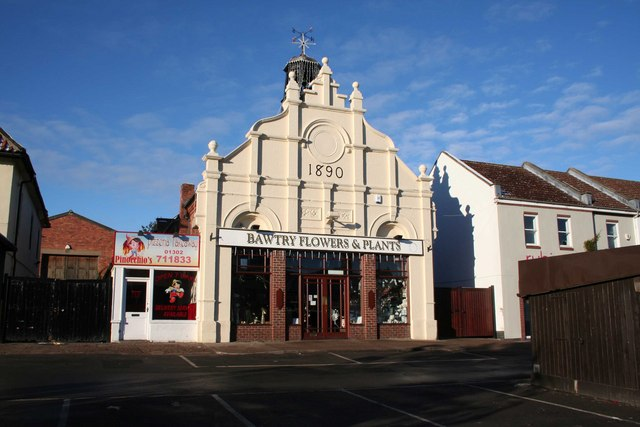
The Old Town Hall

== Notable people ==
- George Morton (1585–1624), Pilgrim Father and publisher of Mourt's Relation

== See also ==
- Listed buildings in Bawtry
- Bawtry gasworks contamination
