= River Idle =

River in Nottinghamshire, England

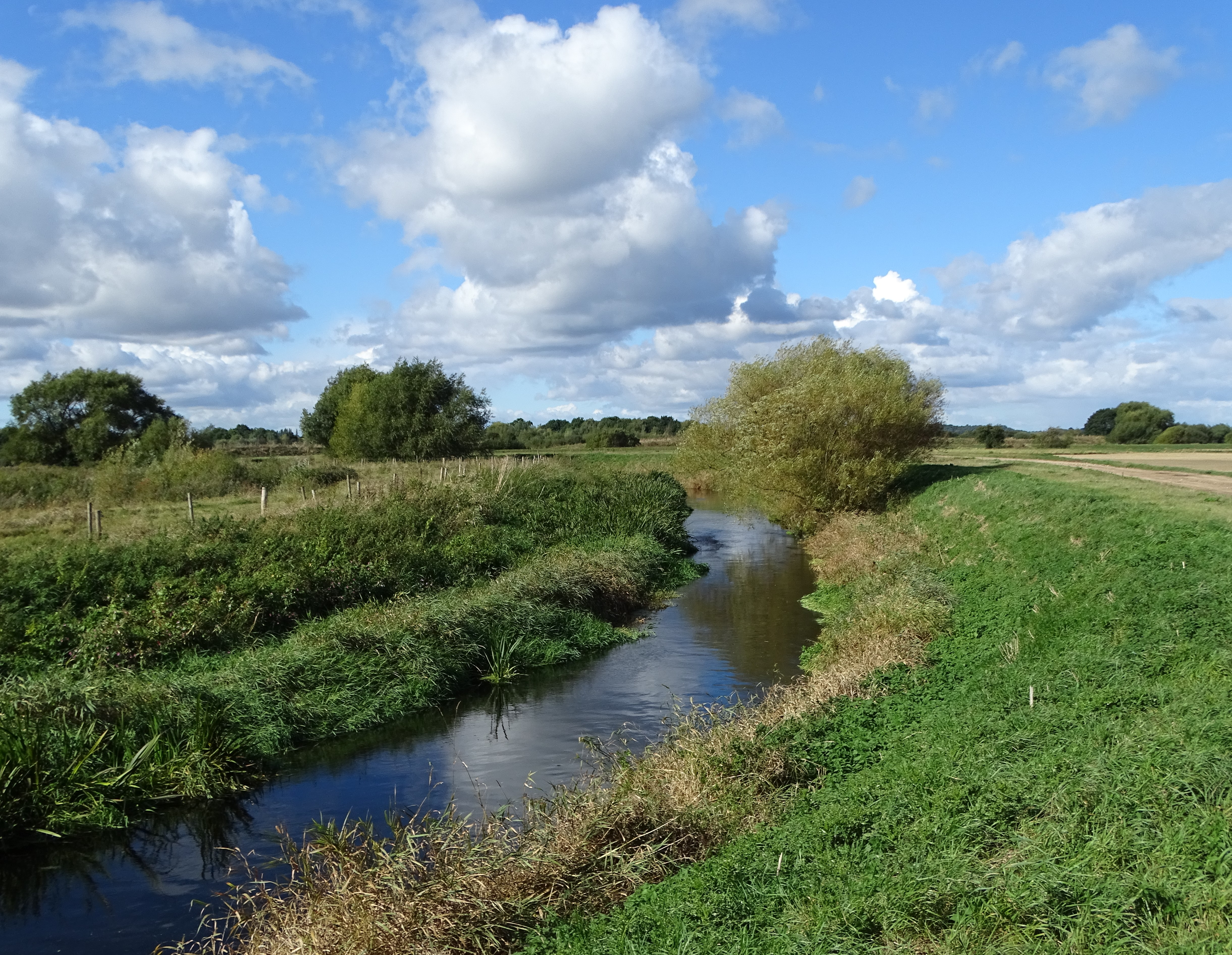
- The river near Chainbridge Lane

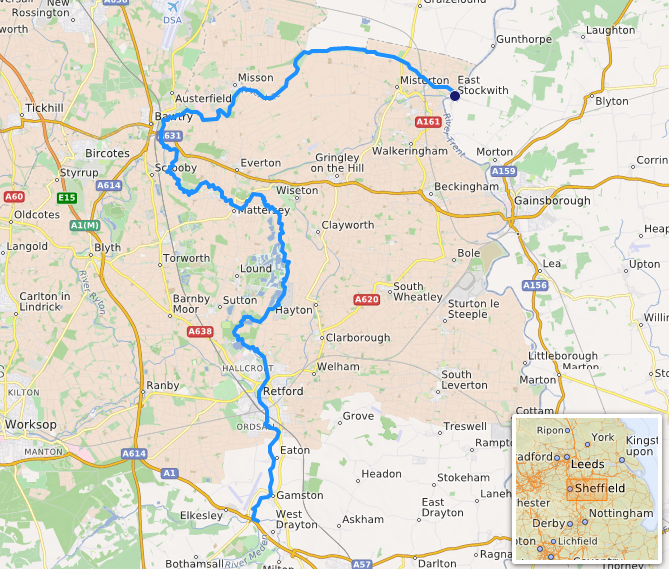

Location
- Country: England

Physical characteristics
- Source
  - location: Confluence of River Maun and River Meden
  - elevation: 59 feet (18 m)
- Mouth
  - location: River Trent
  - elevation: 0 ft (0 m)
- Length: 26 miles (42 km)

Basin features
- Tributaries
  - left: River Poulter, River Ryton

The River Idle is a river in Nottinghamshire, England, formed by the confluence of the River Maun and the River Meden near Markham Moor. It flows north from its source through Retford and Bawtry before joining the River Trent at West Stockwith. Its main tributaries are the River Poulter and the River Ryton. The river is navigable as far as Bawtry, with a statutory right of navigation extending to Retford. Much of the land surrounding the Idle consists of broad flood plain, and the river is significant for conservation, with several Sites of Special Scientific Interest being designated along its course.

== Etymology ==
The origin of the name is not known. River Idle is commonly taken to mean 'slow river' but this is unlikely as river names tend to be even older than settlement names, and the modern name is also at odds with the fact that it is known as a very fast flowing river.

The Survey of English Placenames suggests that Idle (Idel) can mean an empty or uncultivated place. This would fit with the finding that it runs through Bassetlaw which was previously known as Bernetseatte (burnt lands). Bede (HE 2, 12) names the river 'Idla' in 617 with reference to the Battle. This preserves what might have been an earlier ending -ea (meaning river.) In 1200 (British Museum Index of Charters) the river appears as Yddil.

More fancifully, the Jacobean antiquary Dr. Robert Thoroton suggested, before the advent of modern etymology, that the name derived instead from a supposed Roman place-name - Adelocum - claiming that "the river Idle had its name from corn, with which the neighbouring fields ever abounded, and Adelocum was intended by the Romans for the place upon Ydel, after the broad pronunciation of Ai for I, which is still frequent in this country...Ydle signifying a granary amongst the Britons". Unfortunately for his hypothesis, the Roman settlement at Littleborough is now known to have been named Segelocum rather than Adelocum, and so cannot have been the origin of the River Idle's name.

== Hydrology ==
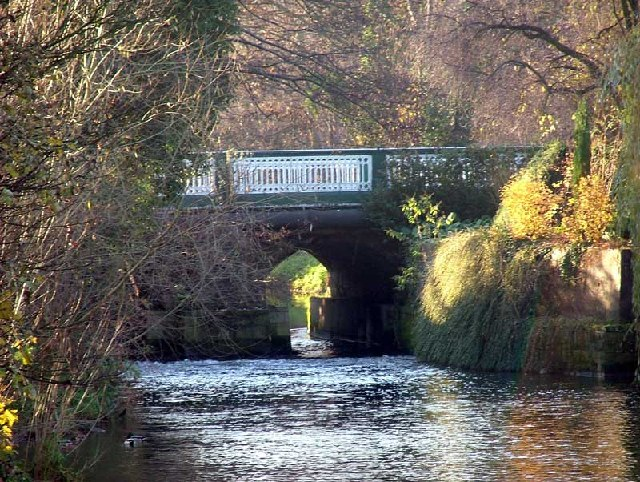
Bridge over the River Idle in West Retford

The River Idle is a significant tributary of the River Trent. The Rivers Maun, Meden and Poulter meet near Eaton, south of Retford to form the River Idle and are joined just above Bawtry by the River Ryton. The River Idle turns eastwards at Bawtry to its confluence with the River Trent at the village of West Stockwith.

The catchment area for the River Idle covers some 280 square miles (725 km^{2}), which has an average annual rainfall of 24.3 inches (620 mm) (based on figures from 1961 to 1990). About a third of this finds its way into the rivers.

There are sources of groundwater (aquifers) across the Idle catchment area, which is dominated by Lower Magnesian Limestone, Sherwood Sandstone and Mercia Mudstone. To the west of the catchment area the underlying geology is Lower Magnesian Limestone which contains quantities of the mineral Dolomite, and is rich in Magnesium. To the east there is the Triassic Sherwood Sandstone aquifer, which is the major geological component of the area. Continuing eastwards, both are these are covered by a layer of Mercia mudstone. Where these aquifers reach the surface, they often supply water to the river system, but can also take water from it.

Public water supply in the Idle catchment area is primarily sourced from the principal aquifer of the Sherwood Sandstone with multiple borehole sites. However, the catchment also receives imported water from Derbyshire. Three water companies cover the catchment area: Severn Trent Water, Anglian Water and Yorkshire Water. This is affected by the extraction of groundwater, particularly for public water supply, and by fracturing of the aquifers as a result of subsidence caused by deep coal mining.

== History ==
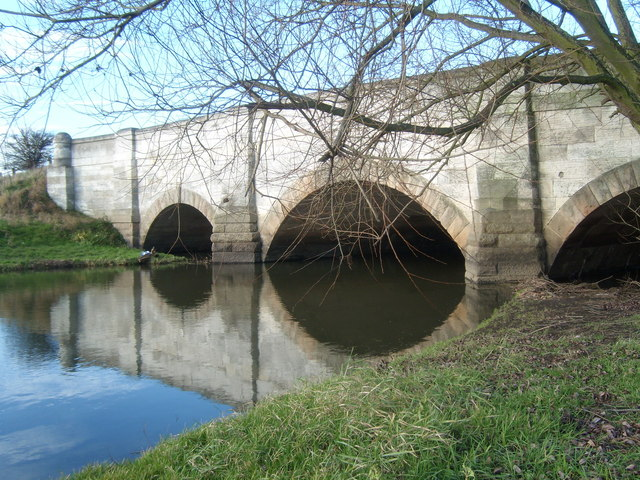
The bridge over the River Idle at Bawtry

It is possible that Bawtry acted as a sea port from Roman times, but little is known of this early period. However, it was associated with the sea by the 12th century, when the parish church was dedicated to St Nicholas, the patron saint of seafarers, and the Hundred Rolls of 1276 listed it as a port. There are records of lead being shipped during the early 1300s, and wool was shipped to Dordrecht from Nottinghamshire via Hull in 1337. The prosperous trading community there suffered a downturn in the early 16th century, but subsequently recovered, with lead being shipped directly to London in 1596. In the same year, a ford constructed across the Bycarrsdyke was described as "a great hindrance to navigation."

=== The Battle of the River Idle ===
Bede records the Battle of the River Idle in 616 or 617 in the Historia Ecclesiastica as part of the story of how Edwin came to be king of Northumbria. Bede tells how Rædwald provided refuge for the exiled Edwin, before assembling an army to confront Edwin's dynastic enemy Æthelfrith. The two armies met on the western boundary of the kingdom of Lindsey, on the east bank of the River Idle. The battle was said to be so fierce that it was commemorated in the saying, 'The river Idle was foul with the blood of Englishmen'. During the fighting, both Æthelfrith and Rædwald's son Rægenhere were slain. Edwin then succeeded Æthelfrith as the king of Northumbria, and Æthelfrith's sons were subsequently forced into exile.

A separate account of the battle, given by Henry of Huntingdon in the 12th century Historia Anglorum, stated that Rædwald's army was split into three formations, led by Rædwald, Rægenhere, and Edwin. With more experienced fighters, Æthelfrith attacked in loose formation. At the sight of Rægenhere, perhaps thinking he was Edwin, Æthelfrith's men cut their way through to him and slew him. After the death of his son, Rædwald furiously breached Æthelfrith's lines, killing him and resulting in a great slaughter of the Northumbrians.

=== Vermuyden and the Participants ===
Until the 17th century, the Idle flowed northwards across Hatfield Chase. To the west of Wroot, the River Torne formed two channels, both of which joined the Idle to the east of Wroot, and the Idle continued to join the River Don to the north west of Sandtoft. From Dirtness, the Don flowed to the north east, to Adlingfleet, where it joined the River Trent near to its confluence with the River Ouse. At some point, a navigable channel was cut from the Idle, running eastwards to the River Trent. Dates for this are uncertain, but it is known to have existed prior to the Domesday survey of 1086, and the villages of East Stockwith and West Stockwith developed at the junction with the Trent. Bykers Dyke was some 5.3 miles (8.5 km) long, and diverted the majority of the flow of the Idle to Stockwith.

In 1626, the Dutch drainage engineer Cornelius Vermuyden was appointed by King Charles I to drain Hatfield Chase. Vermuyden brought over a number of Walloon partners, known as 'The Participants', who took shares and performed the drainage work, which was completed two years later. The Idle's northern course was blocked by a dam constructed at a place which subsequently became known as 'Idle Stop', its waters diverted along the Bycarrs Dyke. The ancient channel was straightened, made deeper, and embanked.

In order to isolate the river from Hatfield Chase, a barrier bank was constructed along the northern edge of this channel, for 5 miles (8 km) from the dam to West Stockwith. A navigable sluice was built about 1 mile (1.6 km) from the river mouth at Misterton Soss by Vermuyden's nephew, John Liens, between 1629 and 1630, to prevent water from the Trent flooding the land to the south of Bycarrs Dike. The construction was of timber, with high banks running to the Trent on both sides of the channel. Lifting gates gave access to a lock chamber 60 by 18 feet (18.3 by 5.5 m), which could be used when the Trent was not in flood. Liens was compelled to carry out the work by the Court of Sewers, to prevent the flooding of Misterton and Haxey Commons.

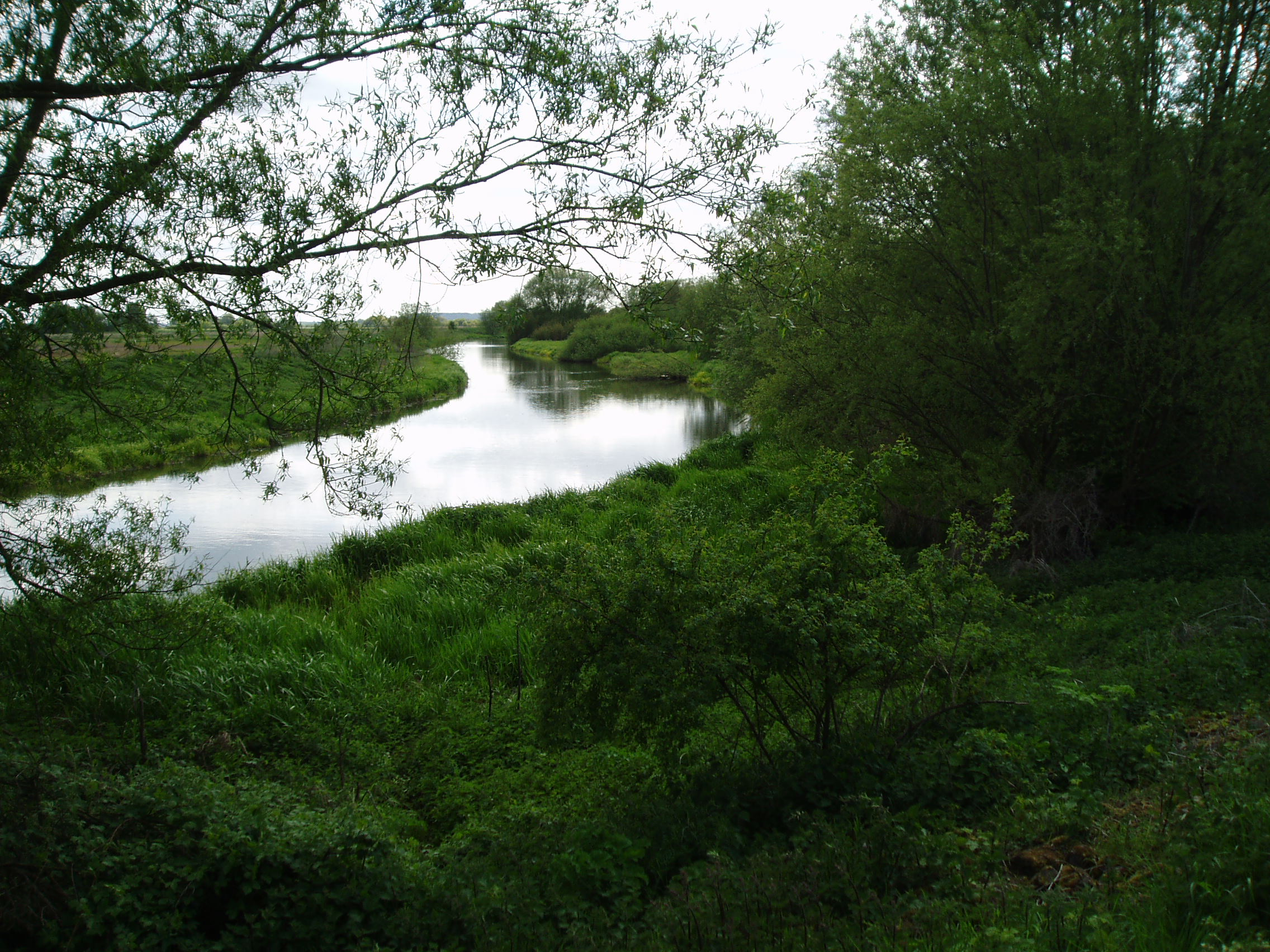
The river at Idle Stop. The original course would have passed through the trees to the right.

A drainage channel called the New Idle River was constructed in a straight line from Idle Stop to Dirtness, crossing the Torne by a tunnel at Tunnel Pits, about halfway along its course. From Dirtness, it was routed to the east to Hirst, where it was joined by the new course of the Torne, and the two channels ran parallel to an outfall at Althorpe on the Trent.

There was a great deal of dissatisfaction with the drainage scheme, which resulted in claims and counter-claims in the courts. A petition alleging that the Participants had caused damage was brought to the Privy Council by several local authorities from Nottinghamshire, and was judged in their favour. The Commission of Sewers decided that a new cut was needed, to carry water from Misterton, Gringley and Everton to the Trent, and so relieve the Idle, but only about 1.2 miles (2 km) was constructed before landowners objected and the work was not completed.

=== The English Civil War ===
During the English Civil War much of the drainage scheme was damaged. The Dutch engineers or 'Participants' supported the King, while ordinary people on the Isle of Axholme supported the Parliamentarians. Alleging that the Royalists would invade Axholme from the south, villagers broke down Misterton sluice and the Snow Sewer flood gates in 1642 or 1643, causing widespread flooding and damage estimated at £20,000. The Sheriff of Lincoln repaired both structures, but a band of 400 villagers destroyed them again. Legal action and rioting continued for some years. Nathaniel Reading, acting for the Participants, raised an 'army' in 1656, and fought a total of 31 pitched battles, including several against the men of Misterton and Gringley. It was not until 1719 that the issues were finally settled and peace returned to the area.

=== Navigation and the 1720 act of Parliament ===
The Idle was only navigable to Bawtry using shallow-drafted boats that were capable of carrying between 12 and 24 tons. Following the construction of the lock at Misterton Soss, which had guillotine gates, any sailing vessels using the river had to lower their masts, and although trade increased during the 17th century, the size of boats on the river tended to be smaller, with their cargoes being transhipped into larger vessels once they reached the Trent. The destruction of the drainage works and the lock during riots in 1643 meant that ships could again reach Bawtry, and lead was shipped directly to Amsterdam in 1645. A new sluice was built in 1645, on the instruction of the Court of Sewers, but by 1720 it was hindering navigation, and the Court of Sewers ruled that the gates should be kept open, unless there was a danger of flooding. Soon afterwards, the single guillotine gate was replaced by a pound lock, which had mitred gates at its upper end and a guillotine gate at its lower end. The new lock was completed by 1724, and was 60 feet (18 m) long by 18 feet (5.5 m) wide. By 1833, the guillotine gate had been replaced by a second pair of mitred gates.

Idle Navigation Act 1719
- Act of Parliament
- Parliament of Great Britain
- Long title: An Act for making the River Idle navigable, from East Retford, in the County of Nottingham, to Bawtry Whars, in the County of York.
- Citation: 6 Geo. 1. c. 30
- Territorial extent: Great Britain

Dates
- Royal assent: 7 April 1720
- Commencement: 23 November 1719 (Note: Start of session.)

Status: Current legislation

Text of statute as originally enacted

In 1720, the merchants of East Retford obtained an act of Parliament, the Idle Navigation Act 1719 (6 Geo. 1. c. 30), to allow them to make the river navigable to Retford and to charge tolls. Although no work was carried out, the plans were still being considered in 1757, by which time much of the river's trade had been lost - the Derbyshire lead trade using an improved River Derwent and the Sheffield trade using the River Don Navigation. Of the 4,415 tons of goods handled by Bawtry wharf in 1767, over 25 percent was lead, but trade had been declining for some years.

The opening of the Chesterfield Canal in 1777 and the Great Northern Railway in 1849 severely affected traffic, with Piercy, a local historian from Retford reporting in 1828 that the river was "idle, as far as navigation goes, and in all probability will remain so." Misterton Soss was rebuilt in 1883 as a three-arched bridge, with gates and boards to control the river level. The upper gates of the lock faced upstream, but it appears that by 1910 the lower gates of the lock and those on the arches used as sluices all faced downstream, so that they closed as the tide rose. Thus vessels could only pass through when the Idle and Trent made a level.

=== Building of Great North Railway ===
The Great Northern Railway route from Retford to Doncaster passed through Bawtry railway station, which opened in 1849. When it was being constructed, a new cut for the river was made at Bawtry due to there being a large bend just above the wharf at Bawtry, but the new channel to the wharf soon silted up. The railway severely impacted the already dwindling commercial traffic on the river.

=== Historic descriptions ===
Daniel Defoe visited the Idle in the early 18th century and described it as full and quick, though not rapid and unsafe...with a deep channel, which carries hoys, lighters, barges or flat-bottomed vessels. He described the port of Bawtry as the centre of all the exportation of this part of the country, especially for heavy goods. Traffic included lead from Derbyshire, brought to Bawtry by pack horse, Swedish iron bound for Sheffield, cutlery from Sheffield, iron products from furnaces in Nottinghamshire and Derbyshire, together with coal and timber.

=== Milling ===
Near to Retford the river has historically provided power to at least three watermills, at Gamston, Ordsall and Bolham. The furthest upstream was Gamston Mill. At the time of the Domesday Book in 1086, Gamston had two mills, valued at 40 shillings (£2), and may also have had two walk mills or fulling mills. Later, the single mill served a variety of purposes, as it was a spinning mill between 1784 and 1805, but is also known to have had a pair of stones in 1789, which would have been used to grind corn, and was probably producing candlewick fabric in 1797. By 1820 it has become a corn mill, while it was involved in the production of paper between 1836 and 1840. It then reverted to a corn mill, as three pairs of French stones, a pair of grey stones, and a flour machine were recorded when the building was being demolished in 1850. Subsequently, the site was known as Mill Farm. The mill was rebuilt around the 1800s, as papers of the Dukes of Newcastle record a payment towards the cost of building Gamston Mill under an agreement made by Henry Pelham-Clinton, 2nd Duke of Newcastle. He died in 1794, although the papers relate to the period from 1807 to 1811.

Ordsall Mill was situated on the right bank of the Idle, just above Goosemoor Lane bridge. The three-storey building probably dated from the 18th century, and had brick walls, with a tile roof . There was a corn mill on the site in 1701, and a paper mill in 1727. Water power was supplemented by a steam engine in 1851, and it was listed as a flour mill in a sales document dating from 1890. Milling ceased in the early 20th century, and the building was in use as a store for scrap iron by 1933. It was demolished in 1989.

A mill at Bolham was mentioned in the Domesday Book, and in 1258 it had to pay tithes to the vicar of Clarburgh. In 1707 the waterwheel was large and wooden, but was subsequently replaced by an undershot wheel which was 13 feet (4.0 m) in diameter and 8.75 feet (2.67 m) wide. In 1771 it was rebuilt to manufacture candlewick fabric, and was rebuilt again in 1800. In 1825 it was working as a corn mill with four pairs of stones. By 1835, it was a corn mill, a wood turning mill and was also producing glazed boards. It had become a corn mill, paper mill and saw mill by 1850, and a four-storey warehouse was built on the site around this time. It was extended in 1854 to become a paper mill, but was unused by 1866. Water power was supplemented by a steam engine by 1877, and it ceased to be used as a paper mill in 1883, when it was bought by Edwin Ashworth and became a tannery. By 1963 it had two breast-shot waterwheels, one of which had been used since the 1940s, while the other drove the entire plant. Water power was no longer in use by 1977, and the leats and wheels had been removed. The mill was demolished in the late 20th century, and the site was redeveloped as flats.

== The Idle today ==
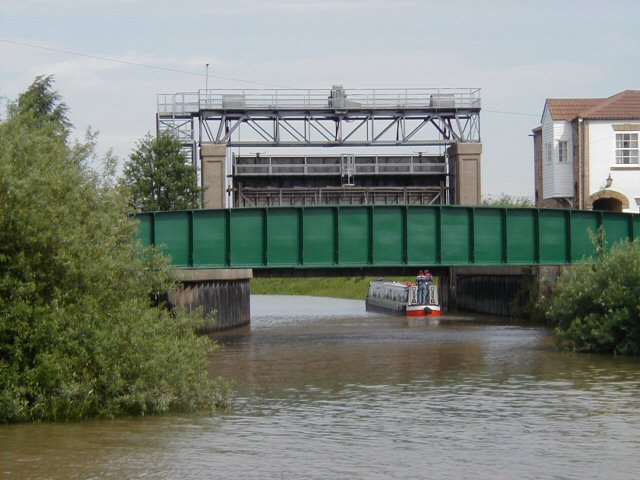
Guillotine Gate at West Stockwith Basin

=== Management ===
The Land Drainage Act 1930 passed responsibility for the management of the River Idle to the newly formed Trent River Catchment Board. In 1938 they built the Trent-Idle sluice across the mouth of the Idle, next to the road bridge. It consisted of a single guillotine gate, 40 feet (12.2 m) wide and 20 feet (6.1 m) high which was regularly opened when tides were low to allow the Idle to discharge into the Trent by gravity. During periods when the Trent was in flood, the gate could not be opened, and the lower reaches of the Idle acted as a pond, with water backing up as far upstream as the junction with the River Ryton, and large areas of washland becoming inundated.

The catchment board was superseded by the Trent River Board, under the provisions of the River Boards Act 1948, which dredged the river and maintained the river level some 8 feet (2.4 m) above ordnance datum. In 1963, the sluice at Misterton Soss was abandoned. The south wall and floor of the lock were removed, and the river level was allowed to run down to the level of low water in the Trent, making navigation difficult.

The Trent River Authority (General Powers) Act 1971 (1971 c. lviii) intended to remove navigation rights but was met with opposition from the Inland Waterways Association (IWA) and Retford & Worksop Boat Club, who were supported by Nottinghamshire County Council, East Retford District Council, Doncaster Rural District Council and the Labour Member of Parliament Nigel Spearing.

In the face of such opposition, the clause to remove navigation rights was removed, although the act still contained proposals for unspecified drainage works which might "interfere with or obstruct the right of navigation." Two fixed weed screens across the river were proposed, as well as replacing the final section of river with a pumping station with culverts into the Trent. The IWA continued to negotiate, and an agreement was eventually reached that the weed screens would not block the entire channel. Because the pumping station was thought to be essential, the Trent River Authority agreed to provide a slipway for trailable boats, which was built near Haxey Gate Bridge.

On 2 December 1971, the government outlined proposals to replace the existing river authorities with water authorities, as part of what would become the Water Act 1973. There would be a new responsibility on such authorities, who would "be placed under an obligation when constructing major works to develop amenities and assist the provision of facilities..." The immediate plans for the pumping station were shelved.

Retford & Worksop Boat Club organised two cruises of the river in 1972, one in April when ten boats reached Bawtry, and one in October, when 15 boats entered the river, but could not pass shallows at Misson. Such cruises became an annual event, and 18 or 19 boats reached Bawtry in 1975, with one continuing on to Mattersey. The boat club thus represented boating interests when the new Severn Trent Water Authority revived plans for a pumping station, and the solution adopted was to provide a second sluice nearer to Misterton Soss, which would allow the river to discharge by gravity for most of the time, with the pumps only being operated under extreme flood conditions.

The pumping station and second sluice were built in 1981, some 300 yards (270 m) west of the entrance sluice. Both sluice gates can be raised to the same level as the underside of Haxey Gate Bridge, and the cills are at river bed level. The river level was then maintained at 6 feet (1.8 m) above ordnance datum, and the river was dredged to provide at least 5 feet (1.5 m) of water up to Bawtry. This resulted in significantly less weed growing, which had previously hindered summer cruises.

With the passing of the Water Act 1989 responsibility for rivers, including the Idle, passed to the National Rivers Authority. Their Recreation Officer stated in 1990 that there was no public right of navigation on the Idle, although the Retford and Worksop Boat Club were allowed to cruise on it once a year. A request to allow other boat clubs to use it was subsequently accepted.

The National Rivers Authority was replaced by the Environment Agency in 1996, who issued a statement regarding navigation. This acknowledged that there was a common law right of navigation from the Trent to Bawtry, and along the River Ryton as far as Blyth. It also stated that there was a statutory right of navigation from Bawtry to East Retford, as a result of the Idle Navigation Act 1719, even though the improvement works on that section of the river were never carried out.

However, in addition to requiring 48 hours notice to enter or leave the river, the Environment Agency imposed prohibitive charges to pass through the sluice gates in 2011. These were set at £185 for each transit, and effectively meant that boats could only afford to enter the river in convoys. This way of restricting navigation on a river is legally questionable as a legal case from 1702 (The King v Clark) stated that the taking of money to let people pass on a navigable river was against Magna Carta clause 23, which could only be negated by an act of Parliament specifically granting such a right. The charges have not been challenged in court however.

Although the Environment Agency maintains the river, there is no navigation authority for the Idle. A paper presented at the World Environmental and Water Resources Congress 2017 considered what the position would be if the Canal and River Trust became the navigation authority for Environment Agency waters. The Environment Agency has also suggested that the river outfall might be reverted to gravity drainage, by leaving the pumping station sluice open and routinely opening the final sluice at low tide. Newman has suggested that access to the river could be significantly enhanced by the construction of a 440-yard (400 m) channel between the river and the Chesterfield Canal at West Stockwith, which would avoid the need for boats to navigate through the sluices, and effectively separate the drainage and navigation functions of the river mouth.

=== Drainage ===
The banks of the river below Bawtry have been raised so that the river acts as a high level carrier for the drainage of the surrounding land. The area between the river and the Chesterfield Canal to the south and the Warping Drain to the north is drained by a network of drainage ditches, which are connected to the river by sluices and pumping stations. Water is pumped from the ditches to avoid flooding of agricultural land, although the pumping station at Gringley can operate in reverse, supplying water to the ditches for irrigation when required.

The outflow into the River Trent is controlled by a pumping station and two sluices. A vertical sluice gate protects the entrance to the Idle, and the pumping station and another sluice are situated further back. When the water level in the Trent is low, the sluice gates allow water to leave the Idle by gravity, but at high tide, four electric pumps are used to pump the outflow into the space between the sluice gates until it can again discharge by gravity. The pumping station was commissioned in 1981, and was the largest all-electric pumping station in Britain at the time. When all four pumps are operating, it can discharge 2,124 tons per minute (3,059 Mld). This was part of the larger River Idle Improvements Scheme, a project completed in 1982 to improve flood defences and land drainage on the lower River Idle.

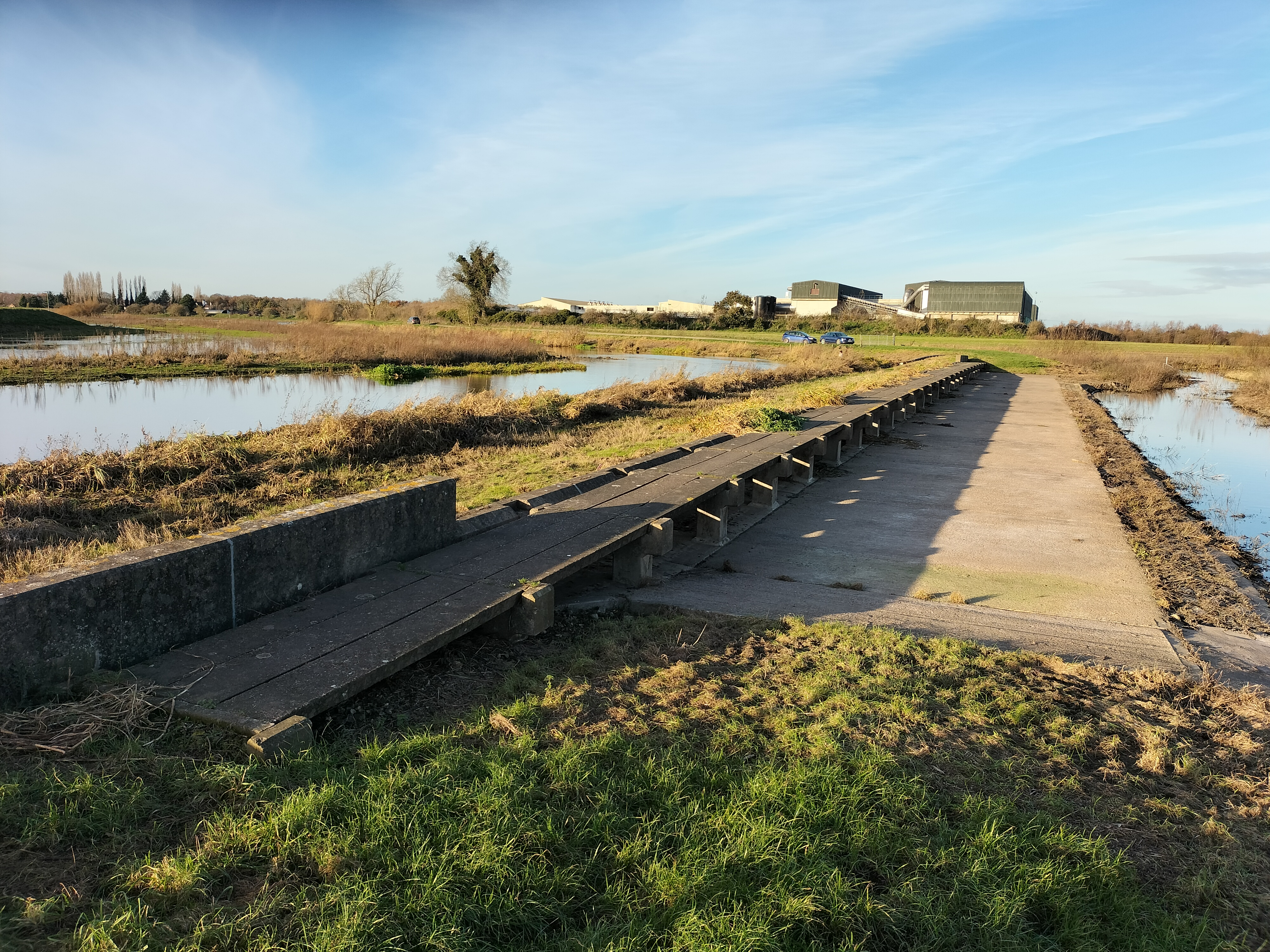
A concrete spill weir allows the Slaynes Lane Washlands to flood when river levels are high

The pumping station can pump around half of the peak flood flow of the river. When this is not sufficient to cope with the volume of water, there are two major areas within the Idle Washlands where the water spills over spill weirs to flood the surrounding land. Both can hold over 5.5 million imperial gallons (25 megalitres), and are therefore classed as reservoirs under the terms of the Reservoirs Act 1975. They are located to the east of Misson, on either side of Slaynes Lane, and to the west of Misson at North Carr Drain, between the river and Line Bank.

A large drainage ditch called The Mother Drain runs parallel to the lower river for the final 10 miles (16 km). This was authorised by the Everton, etc. (Nottinghamshire) Drainage, etc. Act 1796 (36 Geo 3 c. 99) and constructed between 1796 and 1801 by the engineer Thomas Dyson, to collect water from the low-lying land to the south of the river. Vermuyden's single sluice was replaced by a triple sluice at this time. The Mother Drain was pumped into the river by two pumping stations at Misterton Soss, the first example of steam engines being used for land drainage outside of the Fens. The Mother Drain ran from Bawtry to Misterton, although it was authorised to continue to the Trent, and in 1812 William Jessop recommended completing the works and installing a steam pumping engine at the exit sluice. The drain was extended in 1816, but it was 1828 before the pumping engine was added.

At Misterton Soss, the first station, called Kate, was built in 1828 and used a 40 horsepower (30 kW) beam engine to drive a 34-foot (10 m) scoop wheel. The wheel was replaced by a centrifugal pump in 1890, and the beam engine was replaced by a 135-horsepower (101 kW) twin cylinder steam engine in 1895. The second, called Ada, was built in 1839, and another 34-foot (10 m) scoop wheel was powered by a beam engine supplied by Booth & Co, who were based at Park Ironworks in Sheffield. Both became redundant in 1941, when the drainage system was re-organised to feed excess water to a new pumping station at Gringley, containing two Ruston diesel engines driving 40-inch (100 cm) Gwynnes pumps. By 1910, there was a bridge at this point which included tide gates, similar to the V-gates of a lock, which were designed to shut as the level in the River Trent rose. Both the north and the south pumping station are Grade II* listed buildings, and the south building carries an inscribed stone stating "These works erected 1828, Francis Raynes, George Kelk, William Gauntley (Commissioners), Alfred Smith, Engineer". They have been saved from dereliction by being converted to residences, their function performed by the modern electric pumping station at Gringley, while the tide gates have been replaced by the vertical sluice at the entrance to the river.

The low-lying region to the south of the Mother Drain was managed by the Everton Internal Drainage Board, who maintained around 34 miles (55 km) of watercourses. The Board was formally established in 1945, but was the successor to a similar body established in 1796. As a result of the 1941 reorganisation, the flow in the Mother Drain was reversed. Another pumping station was constructed at Scaftworth. The Gringley pumping station was upgraded in 2005 when electric pumps and an automatic weedscreen cleaner were installed.

On the north side of the river, drainage was managed by the Finningley Internal Drainage Board, who were responsible for the maintenance of 24.7 miles (39.8 km) of drains and ditches, which fed surplus water to four pumping stations. Langholme, which is just above Haxey Gate bridge, and Idle Stop pumping stations are situated on the banks of the Idle, while Newington pumping station is set further back on the Austerfield Drain. The fourth pumping station is at Park Drain, on the northern edge of the IDB area, and feeds into the Warping Drain, which joins the River Trent at Owston Ferry. Since April 2012, the pumping stations have been managed by the much larger Doncaster East Internal Drainage Board, formed by the amalgamation of the Finningley IDB with six other internal drainage boards.

Above Idle Stop, the river flows through an area where drainage was the responsibility of the Rivers Idle and Ryton Internal Drainage Board. The IDB was re-formed in 1987, its responsibilities having previously been performed by the Severn Trent Water Authority, and managed 53 miles (85 km) of watercourses. Those to the west of the Idle drain into the river by gravity at a number of locations, but the region to the east of the river and to the north of Retford drains to a single outfall at Wiseton, where a pumping station pumps the water into the river when river levels are too high for gravity flow.

In April 2011, the Rivers Idle and Ryton IDB amalgamated with the Isle of Axholme IDB, Garthorpe IDB and Everton IDB, to become the Isle of Axholme and North Nottinghamshire Water Level Management Board. The move was initiated by the Department for Environment, Food and Rural Affairs (DEFRA), who saw this and other similar amalgamations as a way to increase efficiency, and to allow them to better support Local Flood Authorities.

=== Navigation ===
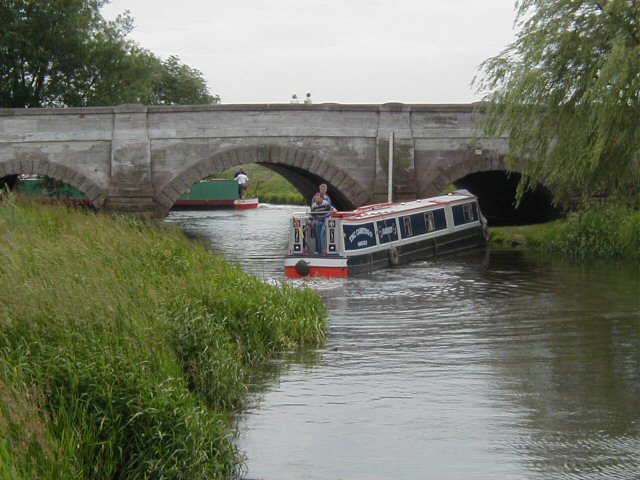
Bawtry Bridge is the upper limit for navigation by narrowboats.

The river is navigable for around 11 miles (18 km) from West Stockwith to Bawtry. The fourth edition of Inland Waterways of Great Britain, published in 1962 stated that the river was navigable as far as Bawtry for boats with a draught of 2.5 feet (0.76 m), and that smaller boats could continue upstream for a further 8 miles (13 km). However, after the demolition of Misterton Soss, few boats could reach Bawtry, and those that attempted to make the journey reported that there were obstructions on the river bed. Boats could only enter the river when the falling tide on the Trent was level with the water in the Idle.

Since the drainage works of 1981, access to the Idle is through the two sluice gates at the mouth of the river, and the Environment Agency requires 48 hours notice of intent to enter it and the payment of a £185 toll. Most boaters that enter the river therefore do so as part of a group, so that the cost can be shared. The space between the two sluices is effectively used as a very large lock, capable of holding a number of boats. Entrance through the first sluice is only possible for an hour either side of high tide. The Environment Agency also require all boaters to sign an indemnity form, which absolves them of any responsibility for loss or damage to boats.

Boats using the river can reach Bawtry bridge. Size is restricted to 59.7 by 18 feet (18.2 by 5.5 m), with a draft of 2.5 feet (0.76 m) and headroom of 9 feet (2.7 m). There are no public moorings. Large boats can turn round with care either side of Bawtry bridge, and at the point where the River Ryton joins the Idle. Above this point, the river can be navigated by canoes all the way from its source. Access to the river can be gained from a bridge over the River Meden some 110 yards (100 m) above the junction with the River Maun, where the Idle starts.

The river also provides water for the Chesterfield Canal. A feeder was constructed in the 1770s, which left the river some 2 miles (3.2 km) above the Retford aqueduct, so that water could flow by gravity to the canal. This arrangement was replaced by an electric pumping station at the foot of the aqueduct in the 1970s.

=== Course ===
The river is largely rural in character, although it passes through the centre of Retford and skirts the south-eastern fringe of Bawtry.

Bawtry bridge, which carries the A631 road to Gainsborough over the river, was constructed in 1810 by Mr Flavel of Wetherby, at a cost of £3,000. It consists of a large central arch flanked by a slightly smaller arch on both sides. The road was widened in 1940, by extending the bridge on its south side, but retains its original character because the south facade was carefully removed and reused to face the new construction.

Point	Coordinates (Links to map resources)	OS Grid Ref	Notes
Source	53.2684°N 0.9480°W	SK702751	Rivers Meden and Maun join
Retford Aqueduct	53.3192°N 0.9466°W	SK702807	Chesterfield Canal crosses
Sutton Weir	53.3430°N 0.961°W	SK692834	
Wiseton pumping stn	53.3965°N 0.9320°W	SK711893	Idle and Ryton IDB
Bawtry Bridge	53.4268°N 1.0143°W	SK655926	Limit of navigation
Austerfield pumping stn	53.4394°N 0.9981°W	SK666940	Finningley IDB
Scaftworth pumping stn	53.4363°N 0.9929°W	SK670937	Everton IDB
Gringley pumping stn	53.4461°N 0.9285°W	SK712949	Everton IDB
Idle Stop and PS	53.4609°N 0.9149°W	SK721965	Former course turned north
Hunters Hill pumping stn	53.4599°N 0.8606°W	SK757965	Finningley IDB
Misterton Soss	53.4472°N 0.8295°W	SK778951	Former pumping stns
Outlet pumping stn	53.4457°N 0.8165°W	SK787949	inc. navigable sluice
Entrance sluice	53.4436°N 0.8127°W	SK789947	vertical lifting gate

=== Water quality ===
Water quality in the Idle is moderate on The Environment Agency's GQA scale. The tributaries of the Idle are rated at 'C' on the GQA scale, because they pass through urban areas, and there are significant discharges to the rivers from sewage treatment works. The average flow in the River Maun is around 13 Mld (megalitres per day) in dry weather, which is supplemented by Mansfield sewage treatment works, which discharges nearly 23 Mld. Water quality does not improve in the Idle, and remains at 'C' on the GQA scale all the way to the Trent. The Environment Agency maintains gauging stations to measure the flow in the river near the junction with the River Poulter, and to the east of Mattersey.

In 2019 the water quality of the River Idle system was measured as follows by The Environment Agency.

Section	Ecological Status	Chemical Status	Length	Catchment	Channel
Idle from Maun/Poulter to Tiln	Moderate	Fail	7.8 miles (12.6 km)	19.71 square miles (51.0 km^{2})	
Ranskill Brook Catchment (trib of Idle)	Good	Fail	6.0 miles (9.7 km)	10.48 square miles (27.1 km^{2})	heavily modified
Idle from Tiln to Ryton	Moderate	Fail	11.2 miles (18.0 km)	23.15 square miles (60.0 km^{2})	
Idle from Ryton to Trent	Moderate	Fail	11.7 miles (18.8 km)	24.04 square miles (62.3 km^{2})	artificial

The reasons given for the poor water quality include sewage discharge affecting most of the river, ground water abstraction, and poor management of agricultural and rural land adjacent to the river system. Like most rivers in the UK, the chemical status changed from good to fail in 2019, due to the presence of polybrominated diphenyl ethers (PBDE), perfluorooctane sulphonate (PFOS) and mercury compounds, none of which had previously been included in the assessment.

=== Flooding ===
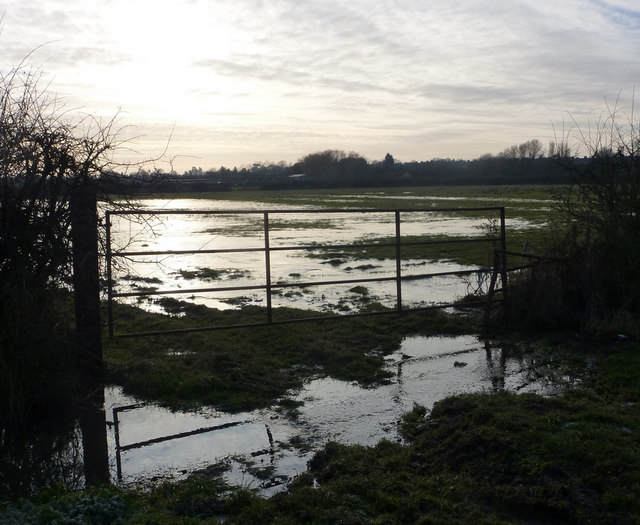
Flooded and frozen fields near Grove Lane

Most of the land surrounding the river is a broad flood plain. As such, the Idle has a long history of flooding towns and villages adjacent to it, as well as agricultural land. The Environment Agency maintains a river gauge at Ordsall (Gauge ID: 4164) where the river has historically measured depths of between 0.19m and 0.85m for 90% of the time since monitoring began. The highest level recorded at this location was on Wednesday 27 June 2007 at 10:30am when the river measured 1.65m. This was at the apex of the 2007 floods. There is a further gauge at Mattersey (Gauge ID: 4015) where the usual depth of the Idle is between 0.55m and 2.70m. The highest level ever recorded at this gauge is 2.81m, which was on Tuesday 26 June 2007 at 10:15pm.

Many floods are recorded in the historical record including:

- 1775 a 'Great Flood' destroyed a house in Retford.
- 1795 flood of Retford. The Nottingham Journal said: "The flood came on so sudden at Retford on Tuesday night, that great numbers of the inhabitants had no time to remove their effects, and several of them have received very considerable losses by it. It was three feet high in the Market-place, and the torrent ran so strong as to tear up the pavement in different parts of the town, which was nearly all under water. At West Retford a grocer's shop, and part of Miss Hurst's house were washed down, and four other houses were nearly destroyed, and their inhabitants preserved with the greatest difficulty."
- 1872 "serious floods on 4 April and two other dates" in Retford.
- 1886 a 'Great Flood' which caused considerable damage on 8 December in Retford. The council demolished West Retford bridge, which was narrow and had five arches, replacing it with a new wide girder bridge to improve the flow of water.
- 1922 Flood.
- 1930 Flood.
- 2007, a few low-lying parts Retford were affected by the 2007 United Kingdom floods. The majority of Kings Park was flooded under three feet of water. The Asda and Morrisons supermarkets adjacent to the river were also flooded.
- 2019 Retford along with the surrounding areas suffered extensive flooding along the Idle flood plain, including in the centre of the town where the Idle crosses King's Park and around the Idle bridge in Ordsall. The local hedgehog rescue centre was flooded, with locals having to rally round to save 70 rescue hedgehogs.
- 2020 there was flooding at Grove Lane and Blackstope Lane with 31 properties affected after a month's worth of rain fell in 24 hours.
- 2021 there was flooding on low-lying land along the course of the Idle near Victoria Road, Retford which is currently used for allotments. This resulted in another call for action against flooding which has been partly attributed to building on the natural flood plain. Restoration of the flood plain has been one solution suggested to address the issue.

=== Conservation and wildlife ===
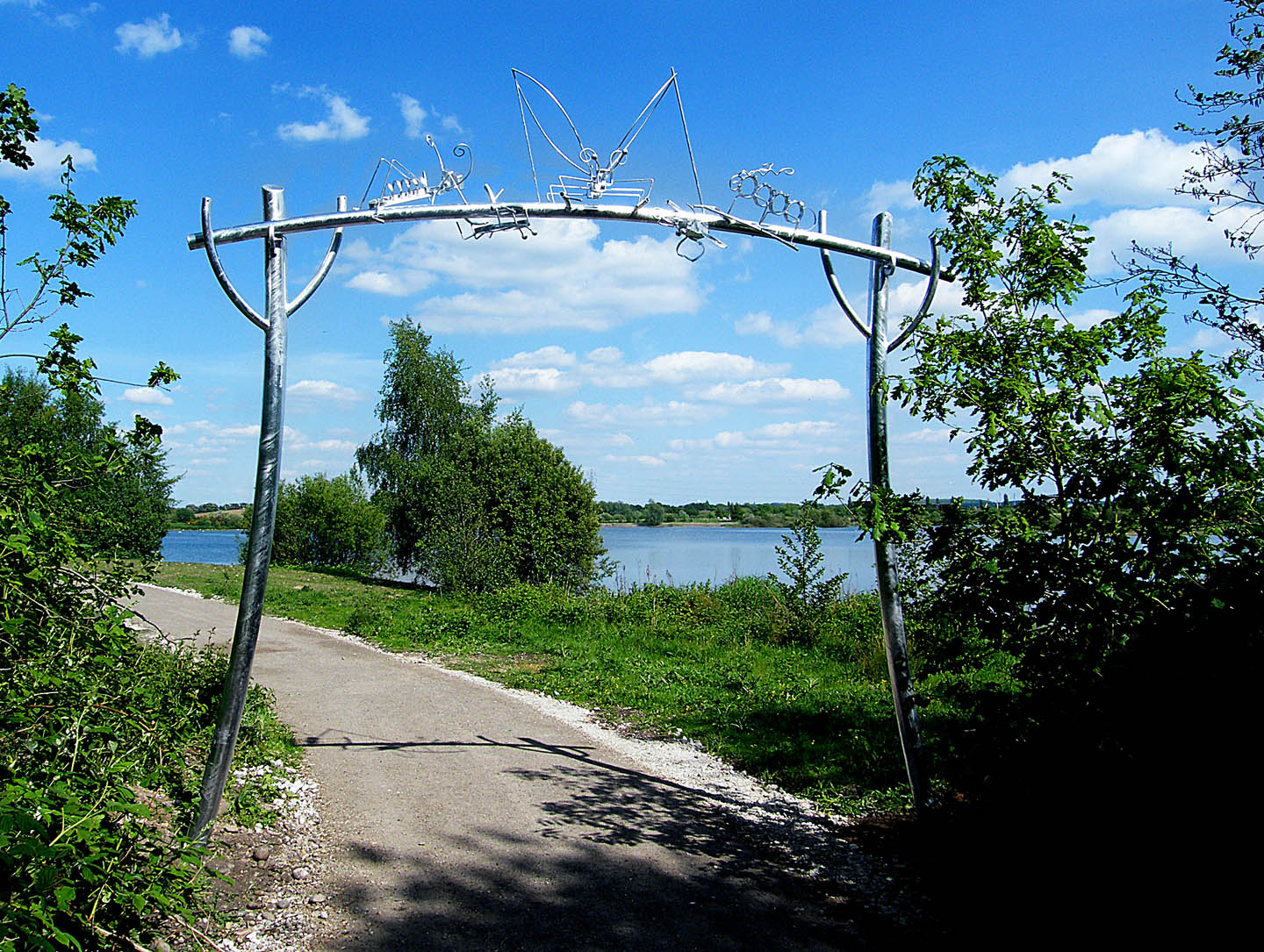
Bug Arch, Belmoor Lake in the Idle Valley Nature Reserve

The River Idle now forms the eastern boundary of the Idle Valley Nature Reserve, with redundant gravel quarries to the west of the river creating wetland areas. Much of the reserve was formerly part of an active quarrying operation, which began in the mid-1940s and was run by the construction group Tarmac from 1981 until 2011. Tarmac sold part of the quarry to the Nottinghamshire Wildlife Trust in 1989, donating further land in 2009 as it wound down its quarrying operations. The reserve was extended even further when land was acquired from Hanson Quarries and when the settling lagoons of EDF Energy's pulverised fuel ash disposal plant were closed in the 1990s and became part of the reserve.

The reserve now comprises a total of 1,100 acres (450 ha) making it the largest of the Nottinghamshire Wildlife Trust's reserves, one of the largest nature conservation sites in the East Midlands and the largest wetland area in Nottinghamshire. Some 781 acres (316 ha) of the Idle Valley Nature Reserve have been designated as an SSSI since 2002. The area supports a wide variety of wildlife, birds and fish, including many endangered species. Parts of the Mother Drain at Misterton are a designated SSSI because they support an exceptional variety of invertebrates.

Between Bawtry Bridge and Idle Stop there are four geographically separated washlands which together form the Idle Washlands Site of Special Scientific Interest (SSSI). Each of them consists of floodplain grazing marsh, and contains wet and dry grassland, open water, swamp and fen. They are located at Bawtry-Newington, Mission West, Mission East and Idle Stop. They were designated because of the plants found within them, but are also notable because they provide habitat for large numbers of breeding and over-wintering birds. 620 acres (250 ha) of washland were designated in 1972, but following the completion of the River Idle Improvement Scheme in 1982, which improved flood defences and land drainage along the river corridor, regular winter flooding of the washlands was reduced, and the SSSI was reduced to 219 acres (88.6 ha) in 1983. Some work was subsequently carried out under the National Environment Programme to ensure that the wildfowl and wader habitat was not lost completely, and the Environment Agency produced a water level management plan to further protect the area.

In early 2013, Heidelberg Materials UK, who have extracted sand and gravel near Newington and Misson for over 30 years, restored 62 acres (25 ha) of the site to benefit wildlife, creating an area of wet grassland. This was extended in 2019 when they created 27 acres (11 ha) of reedbed and another 47 acres (19 ha) of wet grassland. The project included a viewing platform to allow visitors to see the restored site and its wildlife. A further 30 acres (12 ha) of land which was formerly Misson Quarry were restored for agriculture, shielded around its edges by 2500 new trees and 770 yards (700 m) of hedgerows. Hansons will continue to be responsible for the management of the habitat for 26 years.

The Idle burst its banks in the Idle Washlands following heavy rainfall in November 2019. Water levels rose almost to the top of the flood banks, and took a long time to subside. This resulted in some excellent wetland habitat forming, particularly near Slaynes Lane, to the west of Misson. Fields to the north of the river and Newington Quarry were inundated, with the water stretching almost to Bawtry Road. Although recording of bird numbers was hampered by the Covid-19 lockdown, some local bird-watchers were legitimately able to visit the area, and 160 different species were recorded during 2020.

==== Birds ====
The Idle Valley Reserve has recorded over 250 species of birds and it is known for its breeding populations of great crested grebe, shoveler and tufted duck, as well as its starling murmurations. A variety of wetland birds can also be found in the flood plain area towards Bawtry and Misson, and the river itself holds ducks and swans. During 2020, record numbers of swans were observed on the Slaynes Lane washlands, with the number of Mute Swans reaching a peak of 180 on 5 May, and 474 Whooper Swans counted on 1 January.

==== Eels ====
The River Idle is an important habitat for eels but due to modification of the Idle's channels to prevent flooding and allow for navigation, many stretches of river were blocked with man-made structures which young eels found difficult and sometimes impossible to navigate. In 2018 a new eel pass was installed by Aquatic Control Engineering, which was designed to enable young eels to move safely between the River Idle and Belmoor Lake at the Idle Valley Nature Reserve. The structure effectively provides a safe, wet, gradual slope so that young eels can move out of the river into the lake where they can grow until it's time for them to breed. Nottinghamshire Wildlife Trust's Erin McDaid said: “We are hopeful that it will boost eel numbers at the Idle Valley in the long-term and that these important fish will recover in number along the River Idle and throughout the Trent Valley.”

==== Fish ====
Fish commonly found in the Idle include trout, chub, northern pike, common barbel and European perch. Derbyshire County Angling Club have the fishing rights for the 3 miles of river to Hallcroft, Retford. Scunthorpe Anglers have a 1.25 miles stretch at Lound.

A report by the Wild Trout Trust in 2011 noted that the River Idle had been subjected to a major land drainage scheme during the 1980s during which the channel had been widened and deepened, creating "a uniform, trapezoidal cross-section with flood embankments following the river’s course on each bank". This was said to have had a "substantial detrimental effect upon riverine habitat" by creating "an impoverished in-stream habitat, lacking a diversity of depth, flow velocities and bed substrate". The report noted this was reflected in the impoverished fish community. The report recommended a range of measures to improve the environment for fish, and particularly trout.

==== Otters ====
By the Environment Agency's Fifth Otter Survey of England (2009–10), otters were said to be "now widely distributed on the Idle". The reintroduction of beavers at the Idle Valley Nature reserve was in part to improve the environment for otters, while the work done to improve eel numbers in the Idle is also critical for otter numbers as they are a major food source for otters.

== Bibliography ==
- Access (January 2015). Public Rights of Navigation (PDF). River Access For All Ltd. Archived (PDF) from the original on 16 March 2016.
- Blair, John, ed. (2007). Waterways and Canal Building in Medieval England. Oxford, England: Oxford University Press. ISBN 978-0-19-921715-1.
- Butt, R V J (1995). The directory of railway stations. Patrick Stephens. ISBN 978-1-85260-508-7.
- Cory, Vernon (1985). Hatfield and Axholme – An Historical Review. Providence Press. ISBN 978-0-903803-15-1.
- Cumberlidge, Jane (2009). Inland Waterways of Great Britain (8th Ed.). Imray Laurie Norie and Wilson. ISBN 978-1-84623-010-3.
- Dobson, Alban; Hull, Hubert (1931). The Land Drainage Act 1930. Oxford University Press.
- Defoe, Daniel (1769). A tour through the whole island of Great Britain. Vol. 3.
- Edwards, L. A. (1985). Inland Waterways of Great Britain (6th Ed.). Imray Laurie Norie and Wilson. ISBN 978-0-85288-081-4.
- Environment Agency (2006). The Idle and Torne Catchment Abstraction Management Strategy (PDF). Environment Agency. Archived from the original (PDF) on 15 January 2018.
- Environment Agency (June 2019). "River Idle Washlands SSSI Water Level Management Plan" (PDF). Environment Agency. Archived (PDF) from the original on 28 January 2022.
- Environment Agency (August 2021). "River Idle". Environment Agency. Archived from the original on 27 March 2023.
- Furber, Steve (2020). "Newington and Slaynes Lane Bird Report 2020" (PDF). Catchment Based Approach. Archived (PDF) from the original on 9 May 2023.
- Hadfield, Charles (1970). The Canals of the East Midlands. David and Charles. ISBN 978-0-7153-4871-0.
- Hinde, K. S. G. (2006). Fenland Pumping Engines. Landmark Publishing. ISBN 978-1-84306-188-5.
- Jacklin, Tim (June 2011). "Advisory Visit River Idle Nottinghamshire" (PDF). WildTrout Trust. Archived (PDF) from the original on 21 February 2022.
- Jones, Pat (August 1991a). "Soss on the Idle: Part 1". Waterways World. ISSN 0309-1422.
- Jones, Pat (September 1991b). "Soss on the Idle: Part 2". Waterways World. ISSN 0309-1422.
- McKenzie, M. (1993). Rambles in North Nottinghamshire. Sigma Press. ISBN 978-1-85058-366-0.
- Newman, Alan P (2017). The History and Future of the Idle/Bycarrsdyke Waterway and its Catchment. World Environmental and Water Resources Congress. doi:10.1061/9780784480595.027. Archived from the original on 25 November 2023.
- Richardson, C.; Lower, J. (2006). Chesterfield Canal. Richlow Guides. ISBN 978-0-9552609-0-2.
- Roffey, James (1989). The Chesterfield Canal. Barracuda Books. ISBN 978-0-86023-461-6.
- Skempton, Sir Alec; et al. (2002). A Biographical Dictionary of Civil Engineers in Great Britain and Ireland: 1500 to 1830. Thomas Telford. ISBN 978-0-7277-2939-2.
- Smurthwaite, D. (1994). The Complete Guide to the Battlefields of Britain. Penguin Books. ISBN 978-0-7181-3655-0.
- Swinnerton, H H (1910). "Nottinghamshire". Cambridge County Geographies. Archived from the original on 15 July 2018.
- Thoroton, Robert (1796). "East Retford". In Throsby, John (ed.). Thoroton's History of Nottinghamshire Republished With Large Additions By John Throsby. Vol. 3. Archived from the original on 10 December 2023.
- Wilmshurst, Edwin (1908). The History of the Old Hall of the Manor of West Retford. Archived from the original on 5 July 2016.

Note: The amalgamation of several Internal Drainage Boards to form the Isle of Axholme and North Nottinghamshire WLMB in April 2011 resulted in the web pages for Everton IDB and Rivers Idle and Ryton IDB disappearing, and they are not available from the Wayback Machine.
