= Misterton Rural District =

Former local government area in the UK

Coordinates: 53.43°N 0.84°W

- History
  - Created: 1894
  - Abolished: 1935
  - Succeeded by: East Retford Rural District
- Status: Rural district

Misterton was a rural district in Nottinghamshire, England from 1894 to 1935.

It was formed under the Local Government Act 1894, from the part of the Gainsborough rural sanitary district which was in Nottinghamshire (the rest forming Gainsborough Rural District in Lincolnshire.)

It included the following parishes

- Beckingham
- Bole
- Misterton
- Saundby
- Walkeringham
- West Burton
- West Stockwith

The district was abolished in 1935 under a County Review Order, and was added to the existing East Retford Rural District. Since 1974 it has been in the Bassetlaw district.
