= Misterton =

Misterton may refer to:

- Misterton, Leicestershire
- Misterton, Nottinghamshire
  - centre of the former Misterton Rural District
  - contains Misterton Carr, a fenland area
- Misterton, Somerset
