= P. B. G. Binnall =

Church of England minister

Peter Blannin Gibbons Binnall FSA (1907–1980) was a minister of the Church of England and antiquary. He was a Canon of Lincoln and his final position was Sub-Dean of Lincoln. He wrote books on English churches and cathedrals, which often included his own photography. Binnall was elected a Fellow of the Society of Antiquaries for his contributions to scholarship on ecclesiastical architecture.

== Personal life and education ==
Peter Blannin Gibbons Binnall was born on 5 January 1907 and died on 29 November 1980 at Hemswell Gainsborough, Lincolnshire. He married Evangeline S. Goss, in October 1936 at Glanford Brigg, Lincolnshire. They had one son Richard Peter Binnall (born: 2 October 1937).

His parents were Richard Gibbons Binnall (22 Aug 1872 – 16 July 1961), Rector of Manton, Rutland, and Amy Geraldine Binnall, née Pearson (1879–1969). They married in 1906.

He was educated at Worksop College and Lichfield Theological College.

== Church of England career ==
Binnall was a Church of England cleric. He was a Canon of Lincoln and held the positions of: Curate of Caistor (1932–1936); Perpetual Curate of Holland Fen (1936–1945); Rector of East and West Barkwith (1945–1961); and Sub-Dean of Lincoln (1961–1975).

== Antiquarianism, writing and photography ==
Binnall wrote books about English churches, cathedrals and towns, often illustrated by his own photographs. The Conway Library at the Courtauld Institute of Art hold his photographs in their collection, and are currently digitising them as part of a larger digitisation project of the Conway Library collection.

Papers, manuscripts, and his collections of ephemera and books are held in archives including Lincolnshire Archives, Society of Antiquaries of London, and the Church of England Record Centre at Lambeth Palace.

Editor of the Buildings of England series Nikolaus Pevsner thanked Binnall in the Preface to the Lincolnshire volume of the series, noting that he: 'put his unparalleled knowledge of Lincolnshire churches at our disposal and went... through all I had written'. In the volume, further credit to Binnall's work appears with reference to All Saints' Church, Beckingham, with Binnall providing a 14th-century dating for the Chapel of St Mary, and the masonry of St Peter's at Newton on Trent.

=== Publications by Binnall ===
- Caistor Church and Town. Some Historical Notes. Caistor, 1934. 27 pp. OCLC 558111995.
- Practical Hints on the Preservation of Old Churches. Wragby: Lincolnshire Old Churches Trust, [1955]. 8 pp. OCLC 774446984.
- Caistor, Lincolnshire: Historical notes. Rev. ed. Gloucester: British Publishing Company, 1960. 36 pp. OCLC 963617608.
- Thornton Abbey, Lincolnshire. An Historical Guide, etc. with Illustrations. Notes on Churches & Abbeys. no. 48. London: SPCK, 1960. 23 pp. OCLC 1056849993
- The Collegiate of the Holy Trinity, Tattershall, Lincs. Illustrations by Addys, Boston, Ltd. Gloucester: British Publishing, 1962. 28 pp. OCLC 558112018.
- The Nineteenth Century Stained Glass in Lincoln Minster. Lincoln Minster pamphlets, second series, no. 3. [Lincoln]: Friends of Lincoln Cathedral, 1966. 16 pp. ISBN 0903420031.
- Lincoln Cathedral. Pride of Britain Books. London: Pitkin Publishing, 1975. 24 pp; text in French, German, Spanish, Dutch and Swedish. ISBN 978-0-85372-203-8.
