= Walkeringham railway station =

Former railway station in Nottinghamshire, England

Coordinates: 53.4231°N 0.8318°W

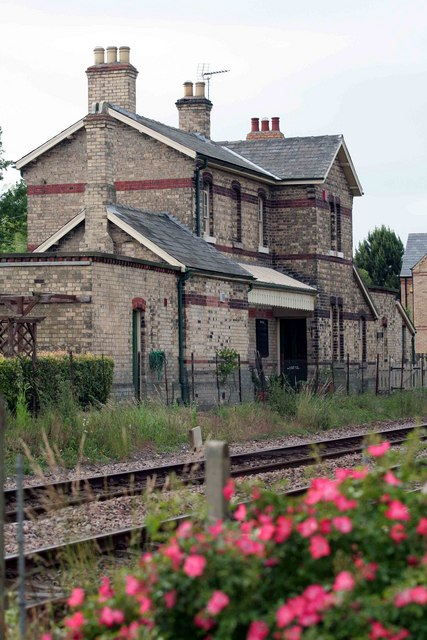
The station buildings are now a private house

Walkeringham railway station was a station in Walkeringham, Nottinghamshire. The station opened on 15 July 1867 and closed for passengers on 2 February 1959, although freight services continued until 19 August 1963 and trains between Gainsborough and Doncaster continue to pass through.

| Preceding station | Disused railways | Following station |
|---|---|---|
| Misterton | GN and GE Joint Rly | Beckingham |
