= Listed buildings in Beckingham, Nottinghamshire =

Beckingham is a civil parish in the Bassetlaw District of Nottinghamshire, England. The parish contains 15 listed buildings that are recorded in the National Heritage List for England. Of these, one is listed at Grade II*, the middle of the three grades, and the others are at Grade II, the lowest grade. The parish contains the village of Beckingham and the surrounding countryside. Most of the listed buildings are houses, farmhouses and associated structures, and the others include a church and its churchyard wall, three buildings associated with Beckingham railway station, and a war memorial.

== Key ==
Grade	Criteria
II*	Particularly important buildings of more than special interest
II	Buildings of national importance and special interest

== Buildings ==
Name and location	Photograph	Date	Notes	Grade
All Saints' Church; 53.40376°N 0.82969°W		13th century	The church has been altered and extended through the centuries, and it was restored in 1876 and in 1891–92. The church is built in stone with roofs of lead and slate, and consists of a nave with a clerestory, north and south aisles, a north aisle chapel, a chancel, and a west tower. The tower has four stages, a plinth, diagonal buttresses, a west doorway with a pointed arch and a hood mould, four string courses, clock faces, paired bell openings, gargoyles, and an embattled parapet with eight pinnacles.	II*
10 Bar Road; 53.39980°N 0.82742°W		Mid 17th century	The house is in colourwashed brick, the ground floor rendered, on a plinth, with a floor band, dentilled and corbelled eaves, and a pantile roof with coped gables and kneelers. There are two storeys at the front and one at the rear, and three bays. On the front is a doorway, a shop window and casement windows, some with rendered architraves.	II
Croft House Farmhouse; 53.39869°N 0.82572°W		c. 1660	The farmhouse is in rendered brick, with cogged eaves, and a pantile roof with coped gables and kneelers. There are two storeys and attics, a double depth plan, and three bays. On the west front is a doorway with a fanlight and a hood, the north front has a canopied porch, and in the south front is a bow window. The other windows are a mix of casements and sashes, some horizontally-sliding, and some with segmental heads.	II
Wall and gate piers, All Saints' Church; 53.40385°N 0.83008°W		Late 18th century	The wall enclosing the churchyard is in red brick with stone coping, and it contains square gate piers. The north gateway has wrought iron gates, and an iron overthrow and lamp bracket.	II
Holme House; 53.39960°N 0.82733°W		Late 18th century	The house is in rendered brick on a plinth, with a sill band, a hipped slate roof at the front, and a gabled pantile roof on the rear wing. There are two storeys, and an L-shaped plan, with a front range of five bays, and a rear wing. In the centre is a doorway with a reeded surround, a fanlight, and a frieze with paterae. The windows are sashes, some horizontally-sliding, and one with a segmental head.	II
The Chestnuts and barn 53.40314°N 0.82727°W		Late 18th century	The house is in pebbledashed brick on a rendered plinth, with moulded eaves at the front, dentilled eaves at the rear, and a pantile roof with coped gables. There are two storeys, and an L-shaped plan, with a front range of five bays. The central doorway has a reeded surround, a round-headed fanlight, and a moulded hood. The windows are sashes, those in the ground floor with segmental heads, and in the right gable end is a round-headed sash window with Y-tracery. The barn, attached at the rear, is in brick with a hipped roof, two storeys and three bays, and it contains 20th-century openings.	II
The Spinney; 53.40377°N 0.82713°W		Late 18th century	The house is in brick with stone dressings, floor bands, cogged eaves and a Welsh slate roof. There are two storeys and attics, and an L-shaped plan with a front of two bays. In the left bay is a doorway with a moulded surround, a rectangular fanlight with geometrical tracery, and a hood on moulded brackets. It is flanked by casement windows, to the right is a mullioned and transomed window, and the upper floors contain sash windows with segmental heads. On the south front is a two-storey canted bay window with a pierced balustrade, and attached at the rear is a two-storey two-bay cottage.	II
Pigeoncote and fodder store, Pear Tree Farm; 53.40377°N 0.84800°W	—	c. 1796	The pigeoncote and fodder store are in brick with pantile roofs. The pigeoncote has a floor band, an eaves band, cogged eaves, and coped gables. There are two storeys and three bays. In the centre is a stable door with a cogged lintel flanked by buttresses, above are three tiers of pigeon holes, and in each gable end are two tiers of pigeon holes. At the rear is a lean-to fodder store with dentilled eaves, and a central stable door flanked by slit vents.	II
Pigeoncote and stables, Barn House; 53.40330°N 0.82682°W		c. 1800	The pigeoncote and flanking stables are in brick with pantile roofs. The pigeoncote has two storeys, a square plan and a pyramidal roof. It contains a round-headed doorway with a rusticated surround and a semicircular fanlight, and above is a fixed round-headed window with imposts and a keystone. The stables contain a doorway with a segmental head, stable doors and fixed-light windows.	II
Gazebo at the Hall; 53.40409°N 0.82750°W		1803	The gazebo is in brick with stone dressings, a floor band, cogged eaves, and a pyramidal pantile roof with a finial. There are two storeys, a single bay and a square plan. Steps lead to the doorway, the windows are sashes, and all the openings have segmental heads.	II
The Vicarage; 53.40634°N 0.82817°W		1873	The vicarage, designed by T. C. Hine in Gothic Revival style, is in red brick on a chamfered plinth, with stone dressings, a cogged floor band, moulded eaves and slate roofs with moulded gables. There are two storeys, a double range plan, and an irregular front of three bays. The doorway has a chamfered surround, pierced spandrels, and a mullioned quatrefoil fanlight. On the front is a mullioned and transomed window, the other windows are mullioned or transomed casements or sashes, and in the roof is a dormer with a hipped roof. In the right return is a two-storey canted bay window.	II
Beckingham Station House and wall 53.39916°N 0.81972°W		c. 1875	Originally the stationmaster's house for Beckingham railway station, it is in gault brick on a blue brick plinth, with dressings in red and blue brick and stone, a floor band, and a concrete slab roof. There are two storeys and an L-shaped plan, consisting of a range of four bays, the left wing projecting and gabled. On the left is a lean-to, and on the right is a single-storey single-bay former ticket office and a toilet block. The windows are sashes with segmental heads. To the right is a boundary wall about 25 metres (82 ft) long, in gault brick with stone coping and recessed red brick panels.	II
Signal box, Beckingham station 53.39939°N 0.81957°W		c. 1875	The signal box is in gault and red brick, with timber framing in the upper part, a dentilled floor band, and a slate roof with stone coping, decorative bargeboards and finials. There are two storeys and three bays, and on the north side is a wooden staircase leading to the doorway and a toilet enclosure. In the upper floor are horizontally-sliding sash windows.	II
Weighbridge cabin, Beckingham station 53.39938°N 0.81934°W		c. 1875	The cabin is in gault brick, with deep cogged eaves and a slate roof. There is a single storey and one bay. On the front is a sash window and in the south gable end is a doorway; both have segmental heads.	II
War memorial 53.40365°N 0.83025°W	—	1920	The war memorial, which stands opposite All Saints' Church, is in Portland stone. It consists of a Latin cross on a narrow shaft on a square plinth, on a square base of three steps. On the plinth is an inscription and the names of those lost in the First World War. There is a stone plaque on the second step with the name of the man who died in the Second World War.	II
