= Misterton railway station =

Former railway station in Misterton, Nottinghamshire, England

Coordinates: 53.4395°N 0.8330°W

Misterton railway station was a railway station in Misterton, Nottinghamshire, England which is now closed.

It was opened by the Great Northern and Great Eastern Joint Railway and closed by British Railways in 1961. Trains between Gainsborough and Doncaster continue to pass through.

| Preceding station | Historical railways | Following station |
|---|---|---|
| Haxey & Epworth; Line open, station closed | Great Northern and Great Eastern Joint Railway | Walkeringham; Line open, station closed |
