= Misterton, Nottinghamshire =

Village and civil parish in the Bassetlaw district of Nottinghamshire, England

Coordinates: 53.44461°N 0.84819°W

Misterton
- Village and Civil parish
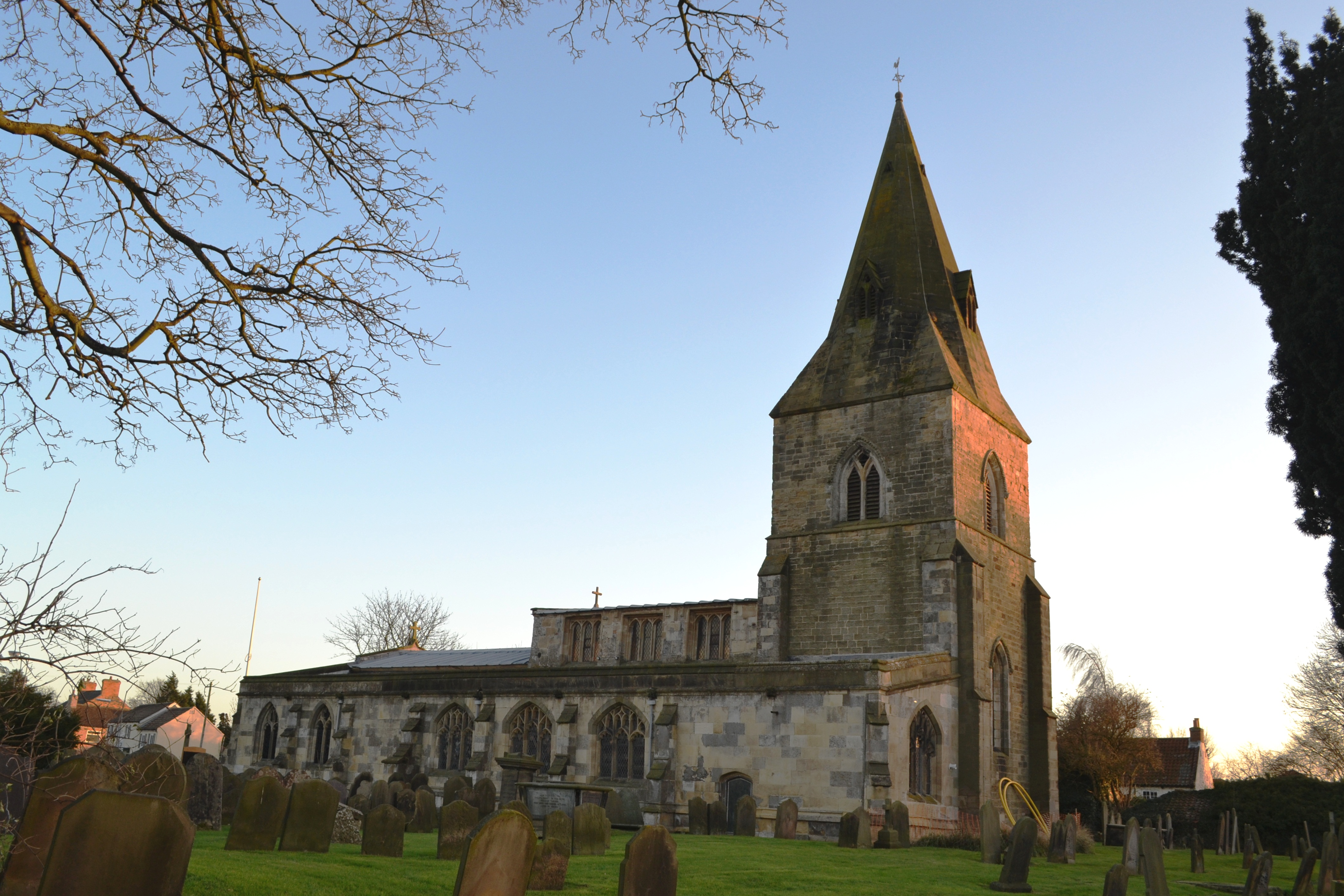
- All Saints Church

- Location within Nottinghamshire
- Interactive map of Misterton
- Area: 6.48 sq mi (16.8 km^{2})
- Population: 2,191 (2021)
  - Density: 338/sq mi (131/km^{2})
- OS grid reference: SK 765948
  - London: 135 mi (217 km) SSE
- District: Bassetlaw
- Shire county: Nottinghamshire
- Region: East Midlands
- Country: England
- Sovereign state: United Kingdom
- Post town: DONCASTER
- Postcode district: DN10
- Dialling code: 01427
- Police: Nottinghamshire
- Fire: Nottinghamshire
- Ambulance: East Midlands
- UK Parliament: Bassetlaw
- Website: www.misterton-notts-pc.gov.uk

Misterton is a village and civil parish in the Bassetlaw district of Nottinghamshire, England. The parish population at the 2011 census was 2,140, and has risen to 2,191 residents in the 2021 census.

== Geography ==
Misterton lies in the far north-east of Bassetlaw and of Nottinghamshire, between Walkeringham to the south and Haxey in North Lincolnshire to the north. To the east of the village is the River Trent and to the west by farmland. It lies six miles (10 km) north-west of Gainsborough, on the busy A161 between Beckingham and Goole. The railway Doncaster to Lincoln Line runs north–south to the east of the village, currently with no station between Gainsborough and Doncaster. The village is the last on the A161 road going north, before Lincolnshire and the Isle of Axholme. The B1403 for Gringley-on-the-Hill meets the main road here. The A161 through to the Isle of Axholme enters less than 1 km north of crossing the River Idle at Haxey Gate Bridge next to the Haxey Gate Inn. The river meets the Trent in the parish. The Trent Valley Way and Cuckoo Way follow the Chesterfield Canal at this point, crossing the Trent at West Stockwith.

The parish boundary follows the River Idle through Misterton Soss and the railway line to the north-east, then continues along the county boundary, again by the River Idle, and follows the Gringley and Misterton Boundary Drain to the west. It crosses Fountain Hill before following Fox Covert Lane, near the primary school, to meet the Trent.

The population has risen to 2,191 as reported in the 2021 census, since the 2001 census put it at 1,223.

=== Subsidiary villages ===
The Misterton Ward of Bassetlaw District Council contains the villages of West Stockwith and Misterton, but excludes Stockwith Road, Newells Terrace, Bramley Way and Pippin Close, which fall within the Walkeringham parish.

=== Misterton Carr ===
Misterton Carr to the west of the village, is an area of fenland. South of the River Idle (until the 1600s known as Bycarrsdike), it forms the lowest reaches of the Isle of Axholme, which extends into Yorkshire and Lincolnshire. Despite attempts since Roman times to drain the flood plain in the area, only further drainage since the 1970s has allowed it all to become arable land.

== Governance ==
Prior to 1935 Misterton was the centre of the Misterton Rural District, which was absorbed by the East Retford Rural District. This in turn was absorbed by Bassetlaw in 1974.

== Toponymy ==
The place-name Misterton seems to contain the Old English word mynster – a monastery, the church of a monastery or religious body, a church served by secular clergy – with the likewise Old English word tūn, meaning an enclosure, a farmstead, a village or an estate. In other words, the name may mean "monastery farm/settlement".

Misterton appears in the Domesday Book of 1086 as Ministretone.

== Amenities ==
The village primary school is located in Grove Wood Road on the former secondary school site. The former primary school buildings in High Street now house the Youth and Community Centre, next to which is a library. There is a Co-op store opposite. There is a fire station to the south of the village, just inside the parish of Walkeringham.

The parish church, a Grade I listed building, is dedicated to All Saints. It belongs to the Church of England Diocese of Southwell and Nottingham. The east window of the Holy Cross chapel was designed by John Piper and made by his glassmaker, Patrick Reyntiens.

== Sports clubs ==
Misterton United football club has been run by the local community for many years. It now ranges from junior through to senior level and also has a girls' team. It plays in the Gainsborough district league and the Doncaster junior league.

Misterton Bowls Club plays in the Gainsborough League, the Isle of Axholme League and the Pensioners League. The last plays afternoon games, the others are evening leagues. Misterton won the Isle of Axholme League in 2018, the first time they had done this since the League started in 1978. The club also plays friendly matches and has an annual away fixture with Cleethorpes.

== See also ==
- Listed buildings in Misterton, Nottinghamshire
