= St Mary Magdalene's Church, Walkeringham =

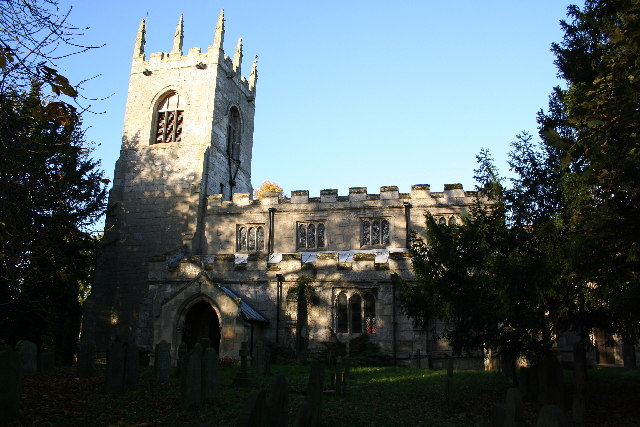
- St Mary Magdalene's Church, Walkeringham
- St Mary Magdalene's Church, Walkeringham
- 53°25′12.32″N 0°50′34.21″W
- OS grid reference: SK 77067 92227
- Location: Walkeringham
- Country: England
- Denomination: Church of England

History
- Status: Redundant
- Dedication: St Mary Magdalene

Architecture
- Functional status: Redundant
- Heritage designation: Grade I listed

Administration
- Province: York
- Diocese: Diocese of Southwell and Nottingham
- Archdeaconry: Newark
- Deanery: Bassetlow and Bawtry
- Parish: Walkeringham

Clergy
- Vicar: Rev D Henson

St Mary Magdalene's Church, Walkeringham is a Grade I listed, Church of England parish church in the village of Walkeringham, Nottinghamshire.

== History ==
The church dates from the 13th century. It has been closed since 2018, following a fall of material from the roof. By July 2021, the roof had been repaired and the pipe organ, built in 1864 but unplayed for 20 years, had been restored. Although a special service was held on 22 July 2021 to mark the Feast of St Mary Magdalene, the church has remained closed for regular worship as further repair work is needed and neither churchwardens nor Parochial Church Council have been appointed.

Since 2022, St Mary Magdalene's has belonged to the Oswaldbeck Benefice, a union of six parishes that also includes the following neighbouring churches:

- All Saints' Church, Beckingham
- St Peter's Church, Clayworth
- St Peter & St Paul's Church, Gringley-on-the-Hill
- All Saints' Church, Misterton
- St Mary the Virgin's Church, West Stockwith

== See also ==
- Grade I listed buildings in Nottinghamshire
- Listed buildings in Walkeringham
