= St Peter's Church, Clayworth =

Church in Nottinghamshire, England

Coordinates: 53.3875°N 0.909167°W

St. Peter's Church, Clayworth
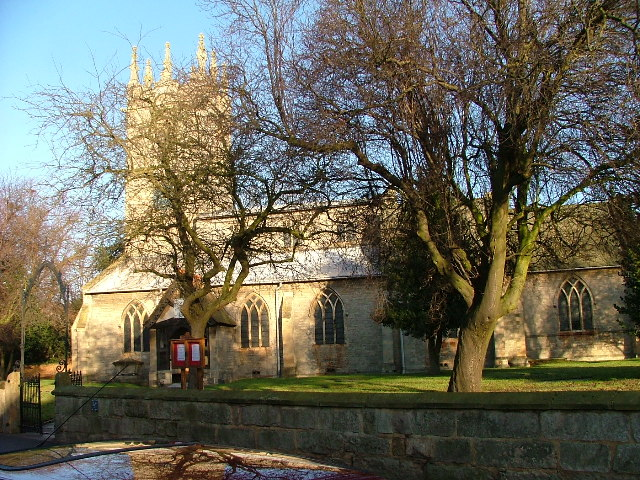
- St. Peter's Church, Clayworth
- St. Peter's Church, Clayworth
- Denomination: Church of England
- Churchmanship: Broad Church
- Website: www.stpetersclayworth.org

History
- Dedication: St. Peter

Administration
- Province: York
- Diocese: Southwell and Nottingham
- Deanery: Bassetlaw & Bawtry
- Parish: Clayworth

Clergy
- Vicar: Revd. Jonathan Smithurst

St. Peter's Church, Clayworth is a parish church in the Church of England in Clayworth, Nottinghamshire.

The church is listed Grade I on the National Heritage List for England.

== History ==
The church dates from the early part of the 11th century, with additions from the 13th, 14th and 15th centuries. A substantial restoration was done by John Oldrid Scott in 1874 to 1875.

Since 2022, St Peter’s has belonged to the Oswaldbeck Benefice, a union of six parishes that also includes the following neighbouring churches:

- All Saints' Church, Beckingham
- St Peter & St Paul's Church, Gringley-on-the-Hill
- All Saints' Church, Misterton
- St Mary Magdalene's Church, Walkeringham
- St Mary the Virgin's Church, West Stockwith

== Features ==
It is notable for the murals painted by Phoebe Anna Traquair. The murals were executed in 1905, and restored in 1996 by Elizabeth Hirst.

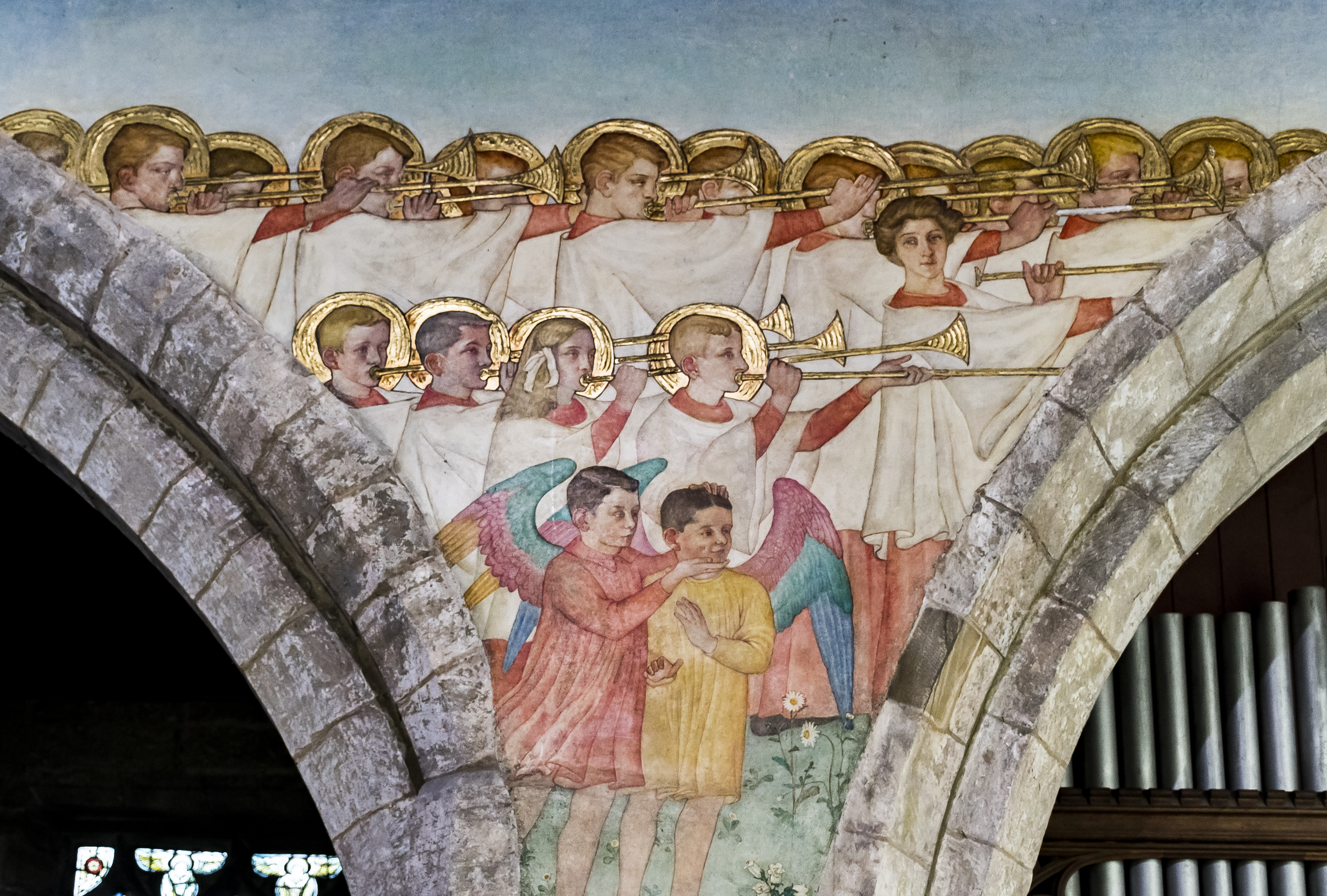
Traquair's murals

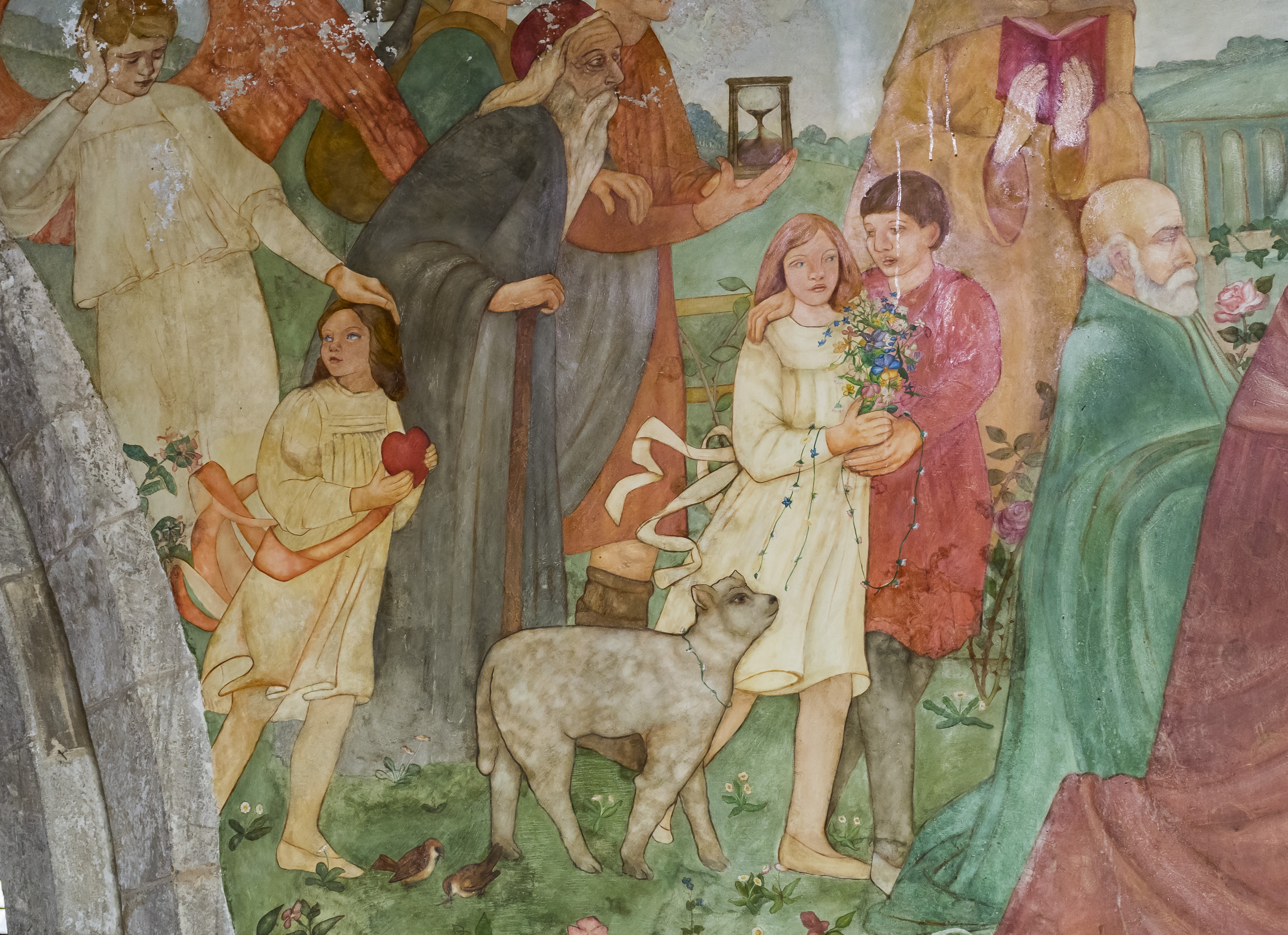

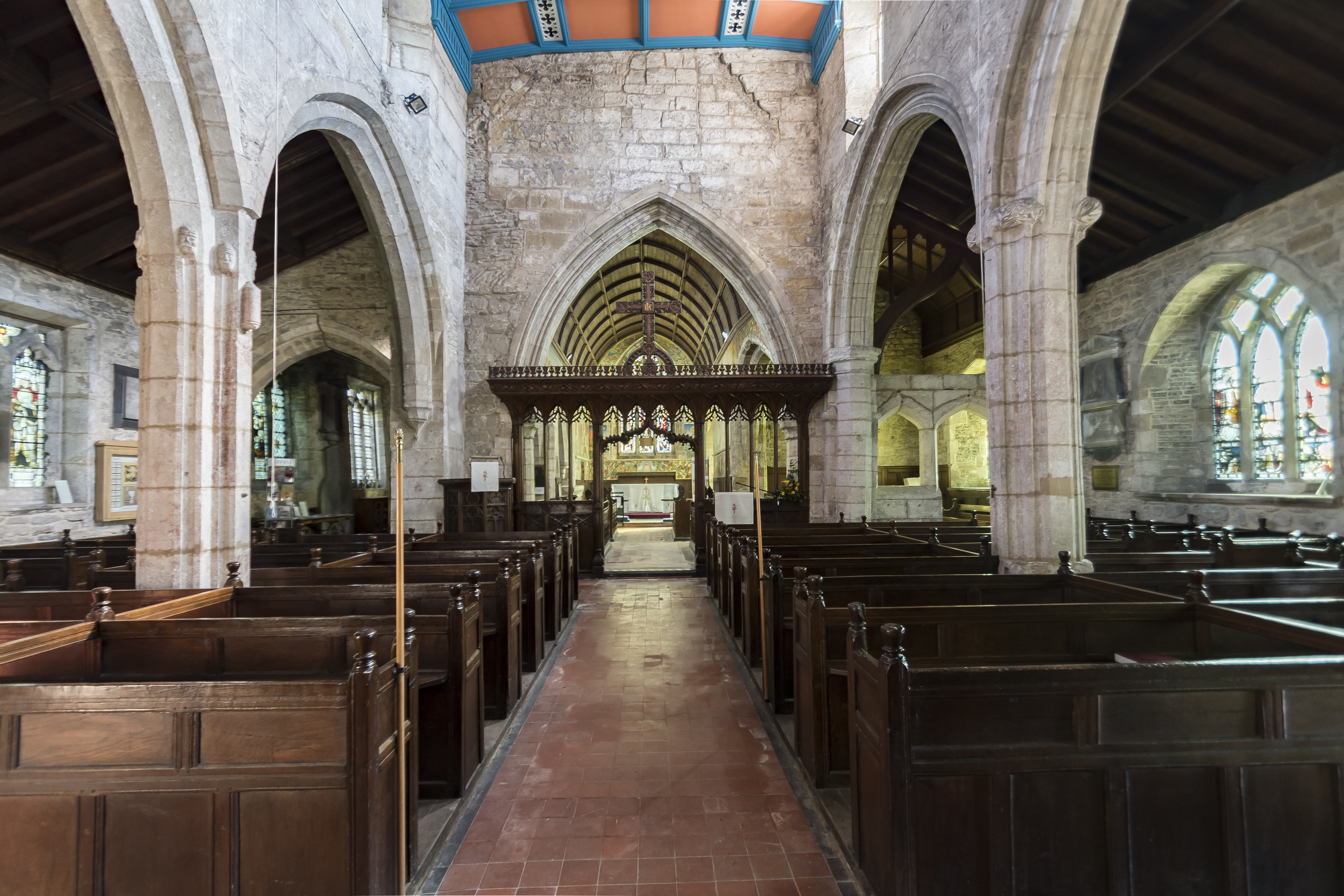
The nave towards the altar

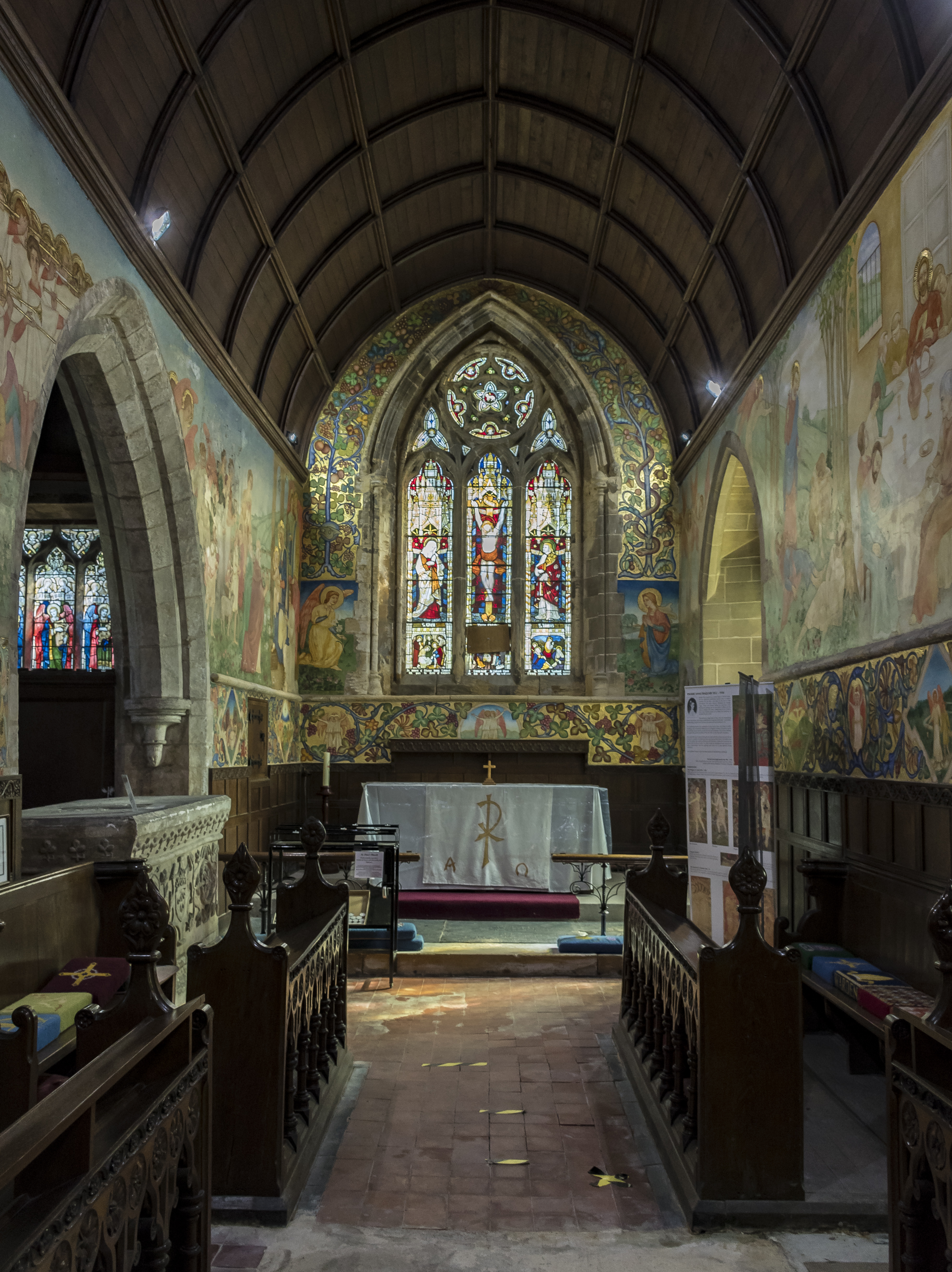
The chancel

== Bells ==
There are eight bells in the tower. The two smallest were cast by John Taylor of Loughborough in 1998. Bells 3 and 4 were cast by the same company in 1951. The fifth was cast in 1897 by John Warner and Sons, London. The sixth was cast by Daniel Hedderly of Bawtry in 1722. The seventh is by George Oldfield I of Nottingham from 1629. The tenor is by William Oldfield of Doncaster in 1652.

== See also ==
- Grade I listed buildings in Nottinghamshire
- Listed buildings in Clayworth

== Sources ==
- The Buildings of England, Nottinghamshire. Nikolaus Pevsner
