= Clayworth =

Village and civil parish in England

Coordinates: 53.383333°N 0.911361°W

- Civil parish
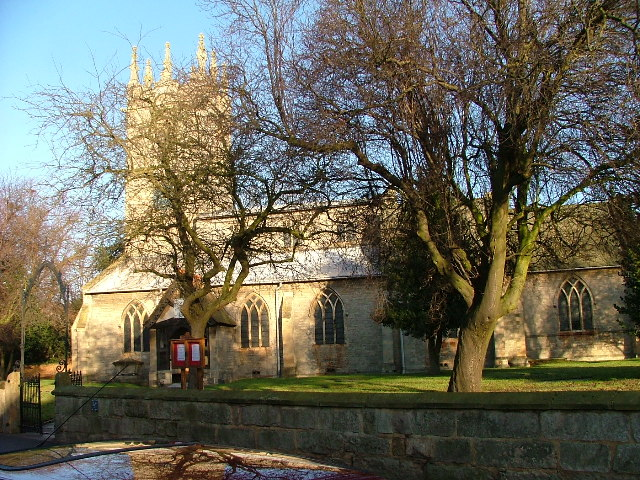
- St Peter's Church

- Location within Nottinghamshire
- Interactive map of Clayworth
- Area: 3.33 sq mi (8.6 km^{2})
- Population: 311 (2021 census)
  - Density: 93/sq mi (36/km^{2})
- OS grid reference: SK 73043 88123
  - London: 130 mi (210 km) SE
- District: Bassetlaw
- Shire county: Nottinghamshire
- Region: East Midlands
- Country: England
- Sovereign state: United Kingdom
- Post town: RETFORD
- Postcode district: DN22
- Dialling code: 01777
- Police: Nottinghamshire
- Fire: Nottinghamshire
- Ambulance: East Midlands
- UK Parliament: Newark
- Website: www.clayworth-parish.co.uk

Clayworth is a village and civil parish in Nottinghamshire, England. At the time of the 2001 census it had a population of 319, increasing to 419 (which included Wiseton) at the 2011 Census. In the Census 2021 Clayworth alone was reported to be 311 residents. The village is 6 miles (9.7 km) north-east of Retford, on the River Idle. Clayworth appears as Clavord in Domesday Book, where 37 households were registered in the parish, which in the context of Domesday Book was considered to be a large population. At that time Clayworth paid low amounts of tax at 2 geld units. By 1769 Clayworth appears as Cloworth. Clayworth was described in John Bartholomew's Gazetteer of the British Isles of 1887 as having a population of 439, with 2,076 acres of land.

== Toponymy ==
Heinrich Mutschmann, writing in 1913, thought that the place-name Clayworth referred to the clay soil of the township. More modern scholarship however inclines to the view that the name seems to contain the Old English word, clawu, a claw + worð (Old English), an enclosure, so 'Claw of land enclosure', and suggests that the claw-shaped feature may be the low, curving hill here.

== Amenities in Clayworth ==
Clayworth has two public houses, one called the Brewer's Arms and one called The Blacksmiths. The majority of Clayworth's local amenities are located 10 minutes away in the local market town of Retford, which has a Morrison's and Asda supermarket, as well as all major shops and pharmacies and local rail links connecting with other major towns and cities. A stagecoach bus link, number 97, runs through Clayworth on its Retford to Gainsborough service every 2 hours. Monday to Saturday .

== Laslett's Study of Clayworth ==
Peter Laslett undertook a study of Clayworth monitoring migration and population changes during the 12 years from 1676 to 1688. Laslett aimed to study how far people moved in relation to their parish of birth. The purpose of the study was to collect detailed data on the residents of Clayworth, it was undertaken by people who lived in the parish itself, the church wardens. The findings from this study showed how 61% of Clayworth's population had migrated away from the village over the 12-year study period, a variety of reasons were suggested including people choosing to move parish to remarry and spinsters who were not socially tied to the village, although the real reasons are unknown.

== Population ==
=== Past ===
The highest level reached by Clayworth’s population, according to census statistics, was in 1841 when 627 residents were recorded as living in the village. The number of households were highest in the year 1851 where there were a total of 151 households in the village, with the population registered as 601 with an average of 3.9 persons per household, this is in contrast with 1921 where only a number of 96 houses were registered in Clayworth and a population of 407 people, with an average of 4.2 people per household. At the time of the 1881 census the biggest family in Clayworth were the Taylors, with 26 people sharing this surname.

Overall, as shown on the line graph pictured left population change has decreased rapidly since 1901 where, in the period from 1901 to 1961, a total of 168 residents left the village. This was the period after the Industrial Revolution in Britain when people from small towns and villages internally migrated to developing towns and cities where employment of both men and women was in demand.

=== Present period ===
A total of 138 residential households are in Clayworth with an average household size of 2.31 persons per household, with 6.55 rooms per household, this shows an older population with independent children who have moved out of the family household as 112 of the houses are owner occupied tenure. Clayworth's population is ageing, of the 319 recorded residents in the 2001 census, only 55 were aged 0–15, the median age of residents was also recorded at 46 years of age, with the mean age of residents being 42.70 years of age, the modal resident age group were aged 45–64 with 114 of the residents at this age. The majority, 200 residents, in Clayworth were living in a couple, 173 of those residents were married, this follows the general trend of the population with people choosing to marry later in life, 53 were registered as single and 38 divorced/widowed at the time of the census lived in Clayworth. In the 2011 census, the count included Wiseton for a total of 419. In the census of 2021, Clayworth singularly was reported to contain 311 residents.

== Industry ==
=== Past ===
Due to its rural location the main industry in Clayworth has been agriculture. The 1831 census recorded 74 male residents in this industry, with 44 of these being agricultural labourers, 13 of the 74 agricultural farmers employing labourers and the remaining 17 not employing labourers, people who lived in the village would work close to home as infrastructure was just being introduced in major cities, people often kept jobs for most of their lives as they would often be harder to find than in towns and cities. No manufacturing was recorded in Clayworth at all during 1831 but 32 men were working in the retail and handicraft industry, this included those working in retail trade or men working as masters or workmen in handicraft.

Agriculture still dominated in 1881, with 71 men and 1 female working, an increase in the service industry saw 26 females and 10 males working in domestic services and officers. As technology developed new industries did also and employment sectors changed for the residents of Clayworth meaning 5 males worked in the Transport and Communications sector. By 1881 women were recorded and had begun to work in Clayworth, although the records for women were seen as far less important, 68 women had missing data in the 1881 census compared to men where all data was present, this suggests that women were housewives and were noted as having an 'unknown occupation' for this reason alone.

The Chesterfield Canal, which passes through Clayworth, was officially opened on 4 June 1777.

=== Present ===
Advances in technology meant that agriculture became less labour-intensive affecting numbers employed in the agricultural industry, with a shift to new, developing industries including the quaternary industry more focused on computer technology and science. At the time of the 2001 census, there were 148 economically active employed residents aged between 16 and 74, the 85 males employed in Clayworth work an average of 45.59 hours per week, with the 63 employed females working, on average, far less at 31.82 hours, with 113 residents working in the tertiary sector also known as the service industry with 93 persons employed in a managerial or professions position in that sector. The average distance travelled to work from Clayworth for residents was 26.24 km, with the majority, recorded at 118, travelling to work by motorcycle, car or van, showing a strong influence on technology. Clayworth's residents are very mobile, with only 13 households not owning a car or van, 66 households own two cars or vans, in total Clayworth has 221 vehicles registered.

== Places of interest ==
=== St. Peter's Church ===
The church is located along Wiseton Road which runs through the village. The tower of the 12th century St Peter's Church, dedicated to St Peter has many old historical inscriptions, it also has a Saxon base surmounted in turn by masonry with Norman windows and a Perpendicular battlemented top. The church was restored in 1874. The oldest memorial in the church is a floorstone which holds a worn inscription to a rector, dating to 1448.

The Traquair murals are located in the church. Completed in 1905 by Scottish artist Phoebe Anna Traquair, these are one of only two mural pieces by her outside Scotland, and are the largest mural work in the East Midlands. They were later restored in 1996 by Elizabeth Hirst.

Clayworth's war memorial is dedicated to the 12 soldiers from Clayworth who died during the Great War and the 6 who were killed in the Second World War. The names are borne on a roll of honour inside St. Peter's Church.

=== Wiseton Hall ===
Wiseton Hall is a stately home near Clayworth. It was originally built in 1771, then demolished in 1960 and rebuilt in 1962. Wiseton was, for some generations, the home of the Acklom family. When Esther Acklom married John Spencer, 3rd Earl Spencer, Wiseton passed to the Spencer family. Later it was owned by the Revd. Neville of Thorney and Revd. Robert Manners-Sutton. Following that it belonged to Sir Joseph Laycock, whose crest is above the main door. More recently it has been home to the industrialist Richard Budge. In 2012, it was reported to be on sale for £4.75 million.

== See also ==
- Listed buildings in Clayworth

== External sites ==
- YouTube video - parish visit journal
