= Beckingham railway station =

Former railway station in Nottinghamshire, England

Coordinates: 53.39890°N 0.81935°W

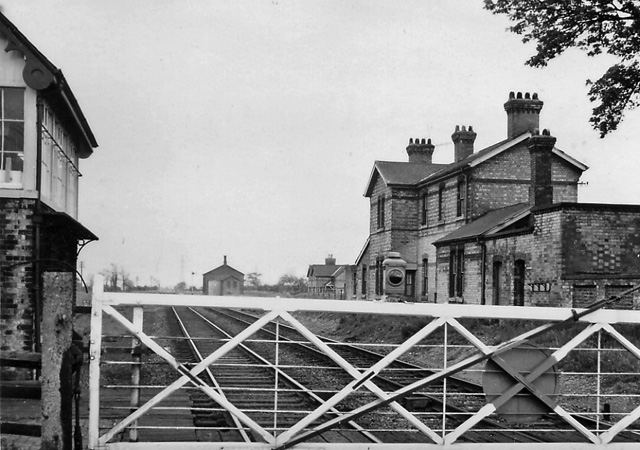
Beckingham railway station in 1967

Beckingham railway station was a station in Beckingham, Nottinghamshire on the line between Gainsborough and Doncaster. The station opened on 16 July 1867, and passenger services were withdrawn on 2 November 1959, although the line through the station remains open. Goods trains served the station until 19 August 1963.

Preceding station	Disused railways	Following station
Walkeringham	GN and GE Joint Railway	Gainsborough Lea Road
