= Listed buildings in Walkeringham =

Walkeringham is a civil parish in the Bassetlaw District of Nottinghamshire, England. The parish contains nine listed buildings that are recorded in the National Heritage List for England. Of these, one is listed at Grade I, the highest of the three grades, and the others are at Grade II, the lowest grade. The parish contains the village of Walkeringham and the surrounding countryside, and the listed buildings consist of a church, the village cross, houses, cottages and farmhouses and associated structures.

== Key ==
Grade	Criteria
I	Buildings of exceptional interest, sometimes considered to be internationally important
II	Buildings of national importance and special interest

== Buildings ==
Name and location	Photograph	Date	Notes	Grade
St Mary Magdalene's Church; 53.42125°N 0.84177°W		13th century	The church has been altered and extended through the centuries. It is built in limestone, partly rendered, with lead roofs. The church consists of a nave with a clerestory, north and south aisles, a south porch, a chancel, and a west tower. The tower has two stages, diagonal buttresses, a moulded plinth, two string courses, and an embattled parapet with eight crocketed pinnacles. It contains a west triple lancet window, clock faces, and three-light bell openings with hood moulds. There are embattled parapets on the nave and the aisles.	I
Village cross 53.42193°N 0.84114°W		Medieval	The village cross is in stone. It has a plinth of three semicircular steps, on which is a broached square base, and the stump of a square shaft.	II
The Manor House; 53.42149°N 0.84117°W		c.1600	The house is in brick on a stone plinth, with stone dressings, floor bands, an eaves band, cogged eaves, and a pantile roof with tumbled coped gables and kneelers. There are two storeys and attics and an L-shaped plan. On the front is a doorway with a fanlight, to its right is a canted bay window, and most of the other windows are mullioned and transomed. On the west front is a doorway with a chamfered surround and a mullioned and transomed fanlight.	II
Moor End Farm Cottage and Bungalow; 53.42819°N 0.85340°W		18th century	The house and the outbuilding converted into a cottage are in brick, with cogged eaves, and a pantile roof with tumbled coped gables. The house has two storeys and three bays. The doorway has a segmental head and the windows are horizontally-sliding sashes, one with a segmental head. The cottage to the right has a single storey and a single bay.	II
Highfield Farmhouse; 53.41991°N 0.86527°W	—	c. 1820	The farmhouse is in gault brick with stone dressings and a hipped slate roof. There are two storeys, a main range of three bays, a single-storey two-bay extension to the right, and a later rear extension. The central doorway has a plain surround and a fanlight, and the windows are sashes, the window above the doorway with a rubbed brick head, and the others with lintels.	II
The Old Vicarage; 53.42061°N 0.84246°W	—	1825	The vicarage, later a private house, was designed by James Trubshaw. It is in stuccoed brick on a stone plinth, with corner pilaster strips, deep eaves and a hipped Welsh slate roof. There are two storeys and an L-shaped plan, with a main range of three bays. The middle bay of the south front is recessed and flanked by pilasters, and it contains a doorway, above which is a cast iron balcony. On the west front are two bay windows, and most of the other windows are sashes.	II
Manor Farmhouse and outbuildings 53.43055°N 0.87261°W	—	Early 19th century	The farmhouse is in brick with stone dressings and a double hipped tile roof. There are two storeys, a double depth plan and three bays. In the centre is a doorway with a moulded architrave and a fanlight. The windows are sashes with rubbed brick heads; all the openings have segmental heads. At the rear are outbuildings with a single storey and three bays, containing an open arcade on iron columns.	II
Mill House and pump 53.41635°N 0.84937°W	—	Early 19th century	A brick house with dentilled eaves and a pantile roof. There are two storeys, three bays, and a rear lean-to extension. The central doorway has a segmental head, and the windows are sashes, those in the upper floor horizontally-sliding. Outside the house is a cast iron pump with a fluted cap.	II
Rose Dene and The Cottage; 53.42870°N 0.86397°W		c. 1860	A pair of estate cottages in gault brick on a plinth, with stone dressings, dentilled eaves, and a tile roof. There is a single storey and seven bays. Two of the bays project, they are gabled and each contains a gabled porch; there is a triangular blank opening in each gable. The windows are casements.	II
