= Listed buildings in West Stockwith =

West Stockwith is a civil parish in the Bassetlaw District of Nottinghamshire, England. The parish contains three listed buildings that are recorded in the National Heritage List for England. Of these, one is listed at Grade II*, the middle of the three grades, and the others are at Grade II, the lowest grade. The parish contains the village of West Stockwith and the surrounding area. All the listed buildings are in the village, and consist of a church and two houses.

== Key ==
Grade	Criteria
II*	Particularly important buildings of more than special interest
II	Buildings of national importance and special interest

== Buildings ==
Name and location	Photograph	Date	Notes	Grade
St Mary the Virgin's Church; 53.44354°N 0.81179°W		1722	The church is in brick on a plinth, with stone dressings, chamfered quoins, a moulded eaves band, a moulded parapet and gables, and a pantile roof. There is a single storey and four bays, and a single-bay extension to the east. The church consists of a nave and a chancel under a continuous roof, and on the east end is a two-stage timber bell turret with a lead domed roof and a decorative weathervane and cross. The doorway has a moulded surround, a fanlight, a frieze and a cornice, and above it is a datestone. The windows are large, with round heads and keystones. Outside the church is a brick stone coped boundary wall with scrolled brackets and an iron spearhead railing. It contains two square brick gate piers with tapered square caps and ball finials.	II*
Grove House; 53.44474°N 0.80983°W	—	18th century	The house is rendered, and has a floor band, corbelled eaves, and a pantile roof with brick coped gables and kneelers. There are two storeys and three bays, and a later rear extension. The central doorway is flanked by sash windows, and in the upper floor are casement windows.	II
Walnut Lodge; 53.44636°N 0.80762°W	—	Late 18th century	A brick house on a plinth, with stone dressings, and a pantile roof with brick coped gables and kneelers. There are three storeys and an L-shaped plan, with a front range of three bays. In the centre is a doorway with a moulded surround, a rectangular fanlight with Gothic tracery, and a hood on scrolled brackets. The windows are sashes, those in the lower two floors with segmental heads. At the rear is a French window, and above it is a balcony door.	II
