= All Saints' Church, Misterton =

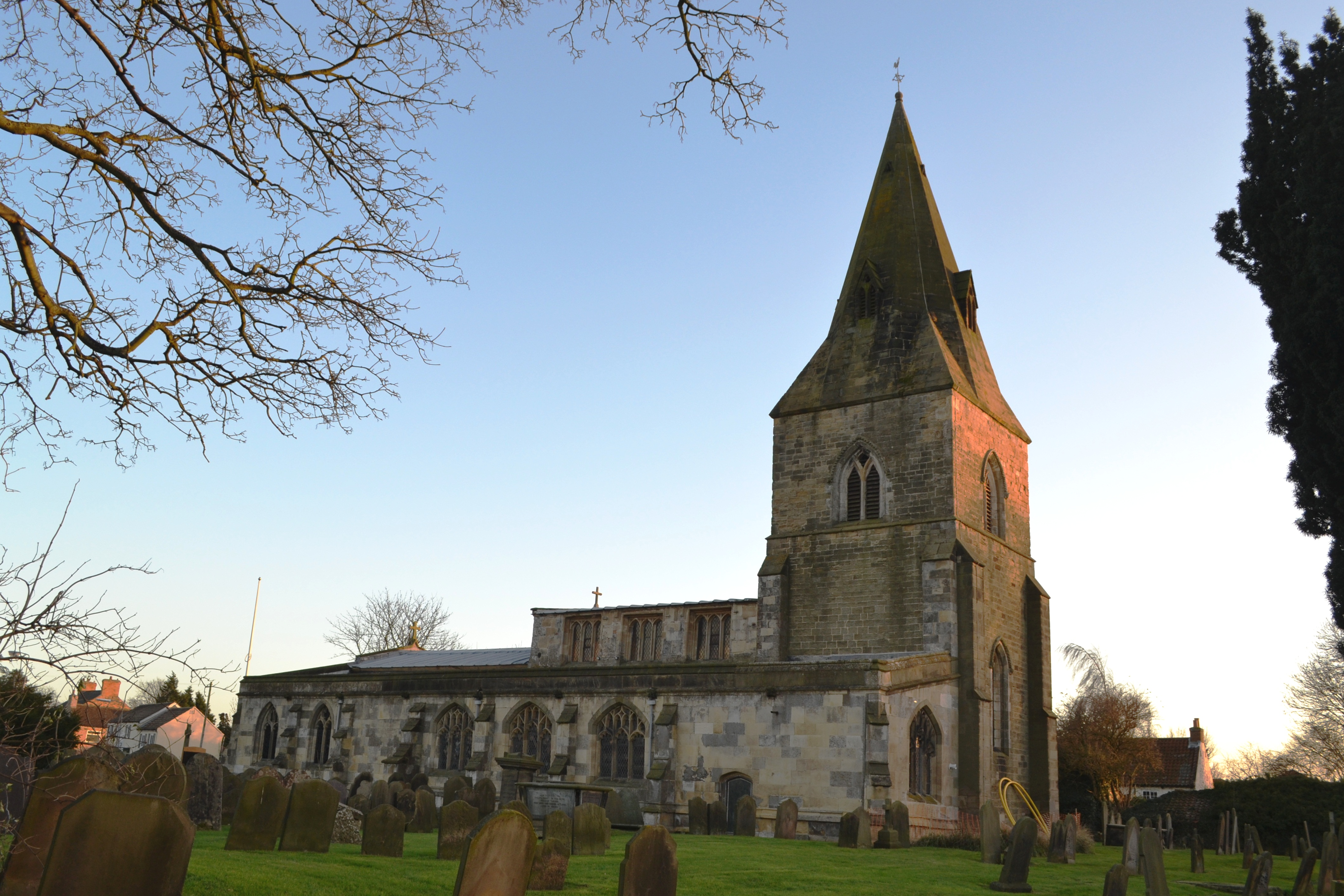
- All Saints' Church, Misterton
- All Saints' Church, Misterton
- 53°26′39.3″N 0°51′00.7″W
- OS grid reference: SK 76471 94774
- Location: Misterton, Nottinghamshire
- Country: England
- Denomination: Church of England

History
- Dedication: All Saints

Architecture
- Heritage designation: Grade I listed

Administration
- Province: York
- Diocese: Diocese of Southwell and Nottingham
- Archdeaconry: Newark
- Deanery: Bassetlaw and Bawtry
- Parish: Misterton

All Saints' Church is a Grade I listed Church of England parish church in Misterton, Nottinghamshire, England. The dedication of the church is to All Saints.

Since 2022, All Saints’ has belonged to the Oswaldbeck Benefice, a union of six parishes that also includes the following neighbouring churches:

- All Saints' Church, Beckingham
- St Peter's Church, Clayworth
- St Peter & St Paul's Church, Gringley-on-the-Hill
- St Mary Magdalene's Church, Walkeringham
- St Mary the Virgin's Church, West Stockwith

== History ==
There was a church at Misterton no later than the 11th century, when it was recorded in the Domesday book.

The medieval church, which had been rebuilt piecemeal in the intervening centuries, suffered significant damage in 1824 when the roof was and south-eastern corner of the building were destroyed in a storm. It was restored in 1848, when the north aisle and tower were partially rebuilt and a broach spire was added by the architectural practice of Weightman and Hadfield of Sheffield.

In 1910 the parish was rocked by scandal when the vicar, Thomas Philips, was convicted at Nottingham Assizes of “unnatural conduct”. At that time homosexuality remained illegal in the UK, and Philips was sentenced to 15 months in prison and deprived of holy orders.

== Architecture ==
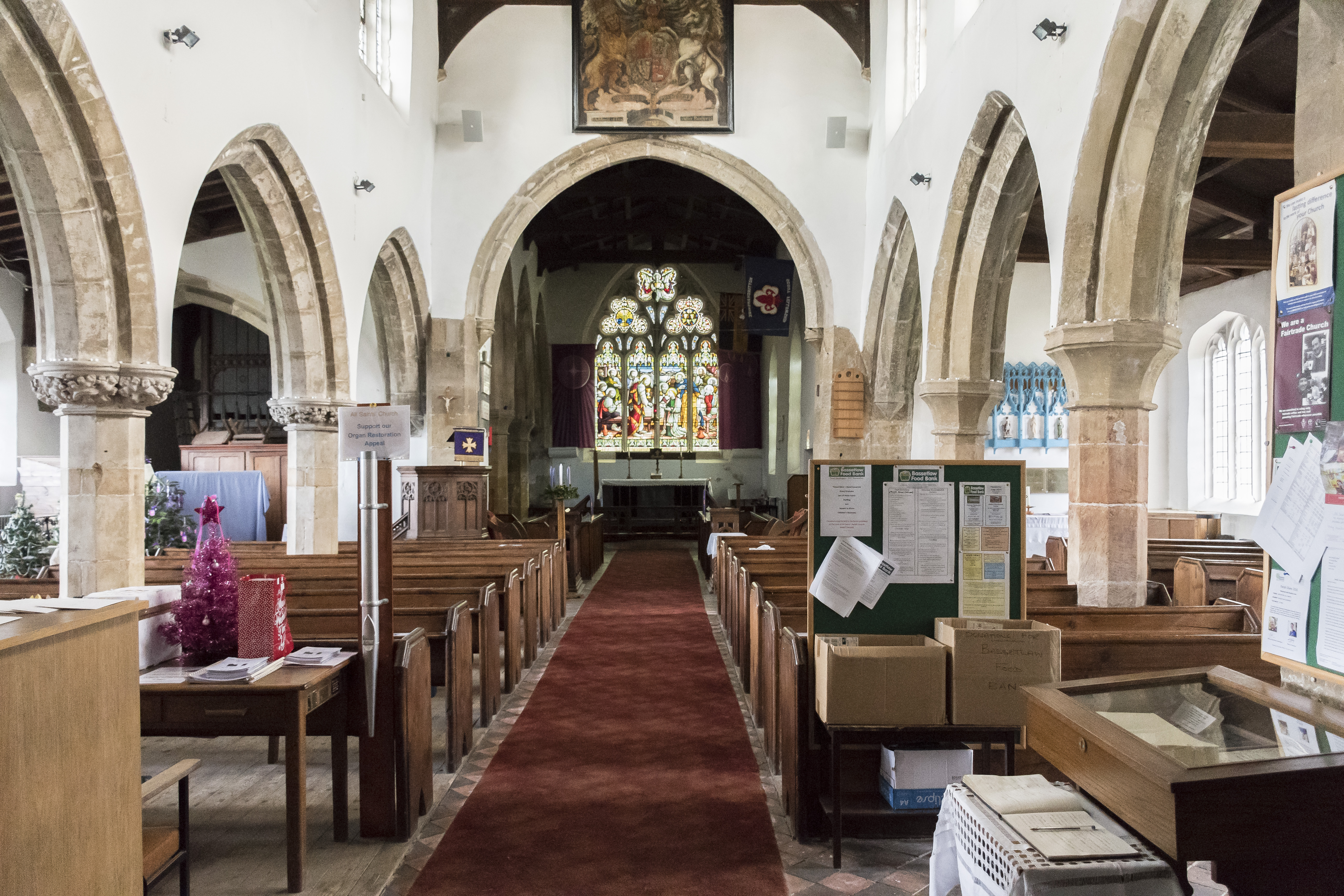
View of the nave and chancel

All Saints’ Church exhibits architectural development from the 13th to the 19th century. It is constructed of ashlar, rubble, and render, with lead roofs, and comprises a west tower, nave, chancel, north and south aisles, north apsidal chapel, and a south porch.

The west tower, begun in the 13th century, features lancet windows with dogtooth decoration; the second stage contains 14th-century paired lancets with Y-tracery, while the spire dates from the Victorian rebuilding. The north aisle has 15th-century lancet windows alongside 19th-century Decorated Gothic openings and retains a partly blocked 15th-century doorway. The chancel contains a distinctive 17th-century quadruple lancet with trefoil heads.

Inside, the seven-bay nave arcade dates from the 13th or 14th century and feature octagonal piers with grotesque and oak-leaf capitals, while the 14th-century south arcade displays moulded capitals and responds. Furnishings include a 13th-century baptismal font with a 1660 bowl, a 1721 Royal Coat of Arms by Addinell of Doncaster, and 19th-century pulpit, pews, and lectern. Memorials include an 18th-century tablet to Nicholas Walton, Master Shipwright, and a 1771 slate tablet to Robert Hickson, a rope-maker.

=== Stained Glass ===
In the north aisle, set in an otherwise clear-glazed window, is a fragment of medieval glass depicting a bishop. The main four-light east chancel window depicts the Lord’s Supper, based on a painting by Julius Schnorr von Carolsfeld. It commemorates Queen Victoria and was installed in 1902 by Thomas & Co. The south wall of the chancel has three windows by C E Kempe & Co. The three-light window to the west depicts the Presentation in the Temple and was installed in 1905. The easternmost and central windows, both installed 1929, have two lights depicting the Four Evangelists, the Annunciation, and the Adoration of the Shepherds. A three light window in the south aisle depicting saints Oswald, Stephen, and Alban is also by Kempe & Co. Itbwas installed in 1921 in memory of the men of Misterton who died in the First World War.

Above the altar in the north apsidal chapel, which is dedicated to the Holy Cross, is a three-light window filled with stained glass designed by John Piper and manufactured by Patrick Reyntiens. It was installed in 1966. Piper's design is a novel depiction of the Five Holy Wounds inflicted on Jesus during his Crucifixion. A hand and foot are shown displaying the Stigmata in each of the left and right lights, with a bleeding heart shown in the centre light. These are set against a green, plant-like form in the shape of a cross on a dark blue background. Two more windows in the Holy Cross Chapel, both in the north wall, are by David Sear of Lincolnshire Stained Glass Studios. Installed in 1999, they depict the Good Shepherd and the Eucharist.

== Gallery ==
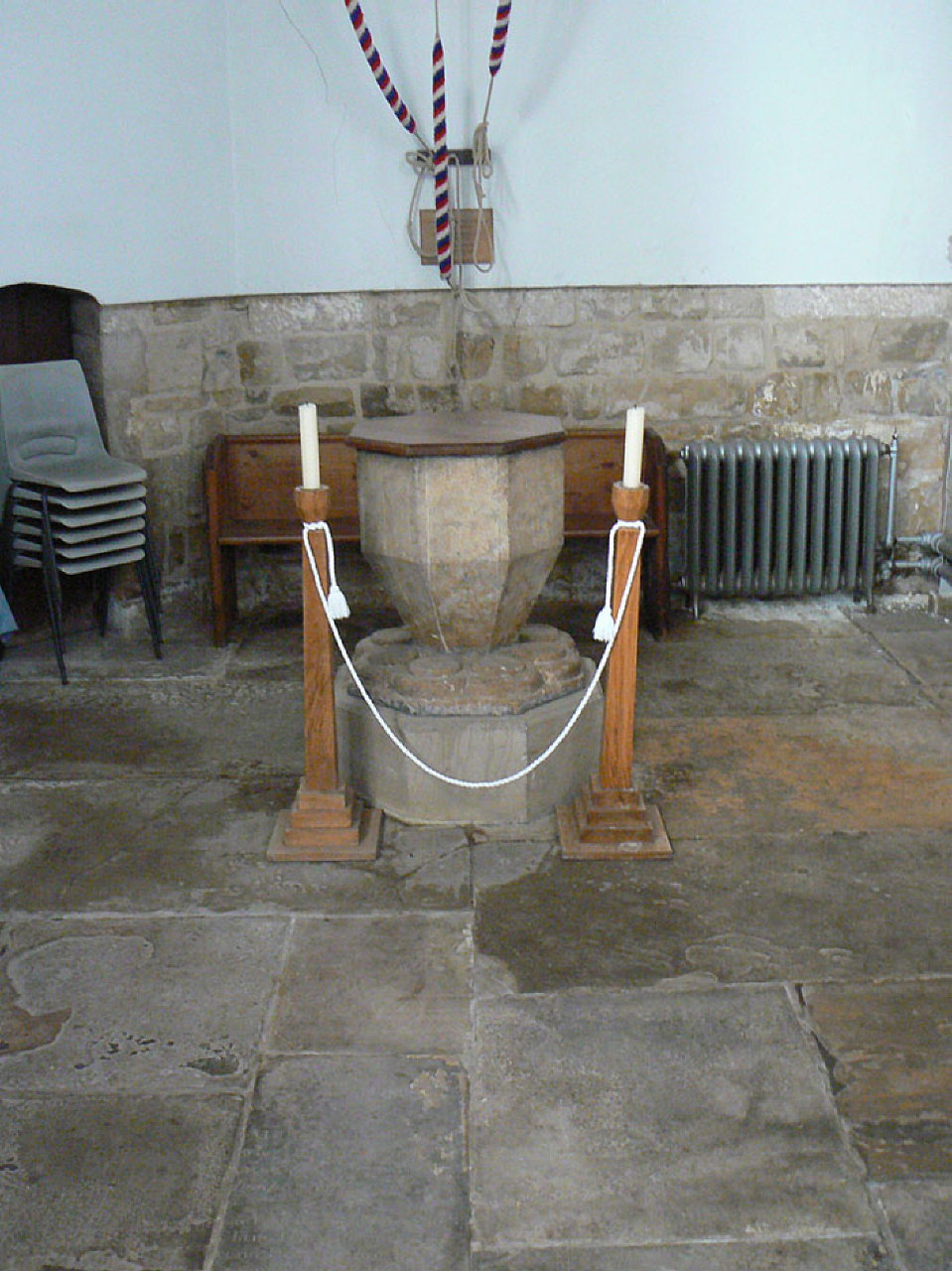
The baptismal font

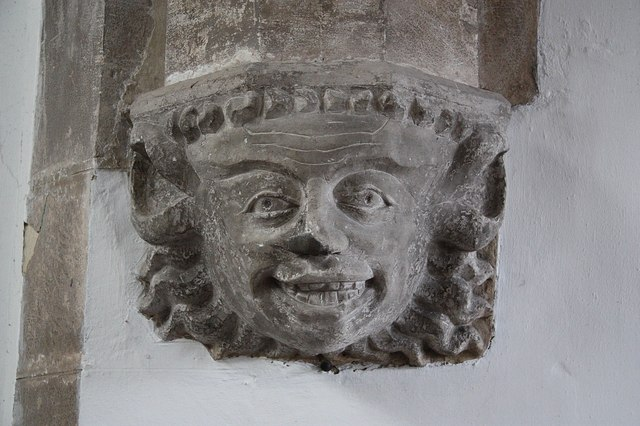
14th century corbel

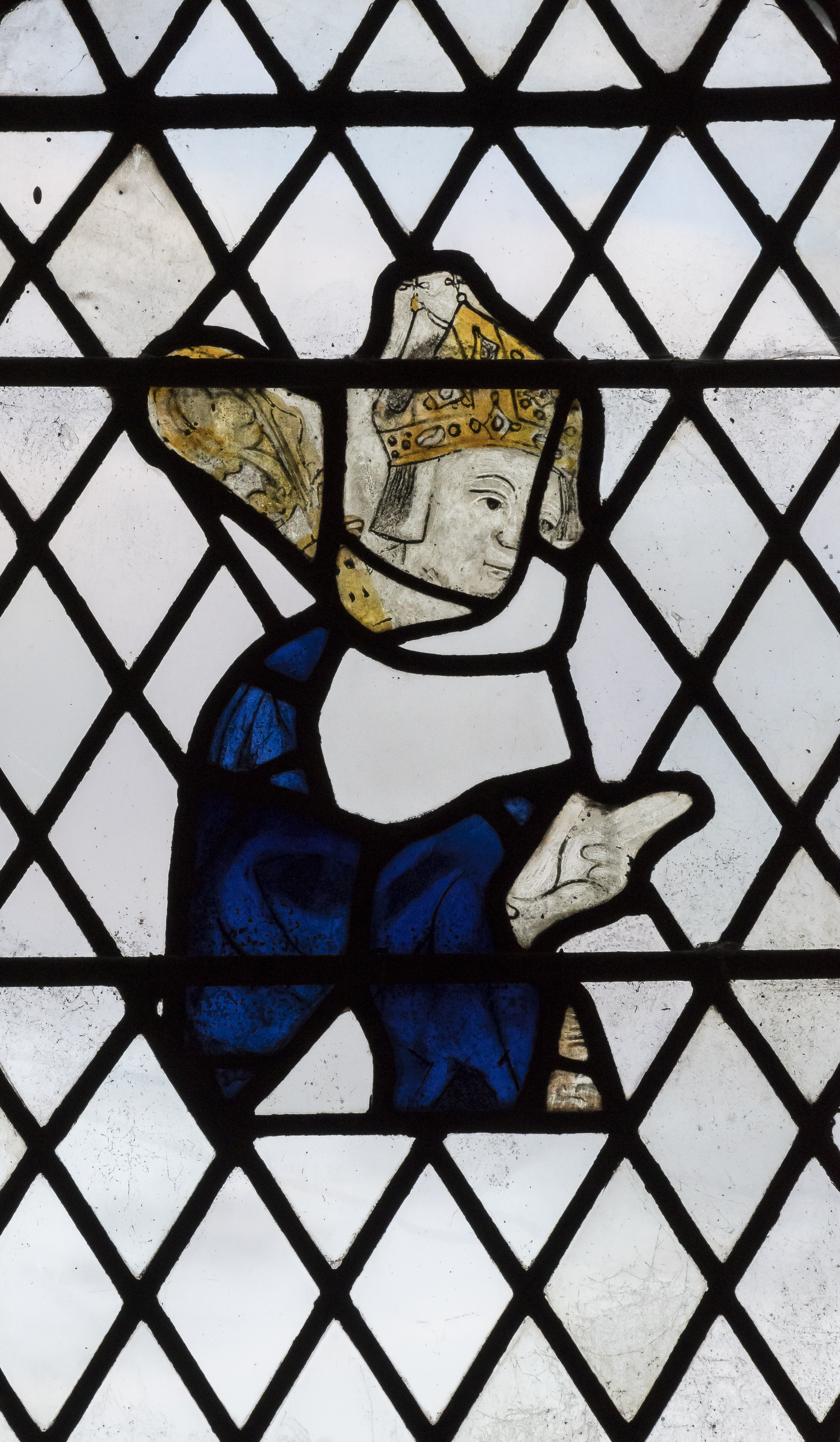
Fragment of medieval glass depicting a bishop

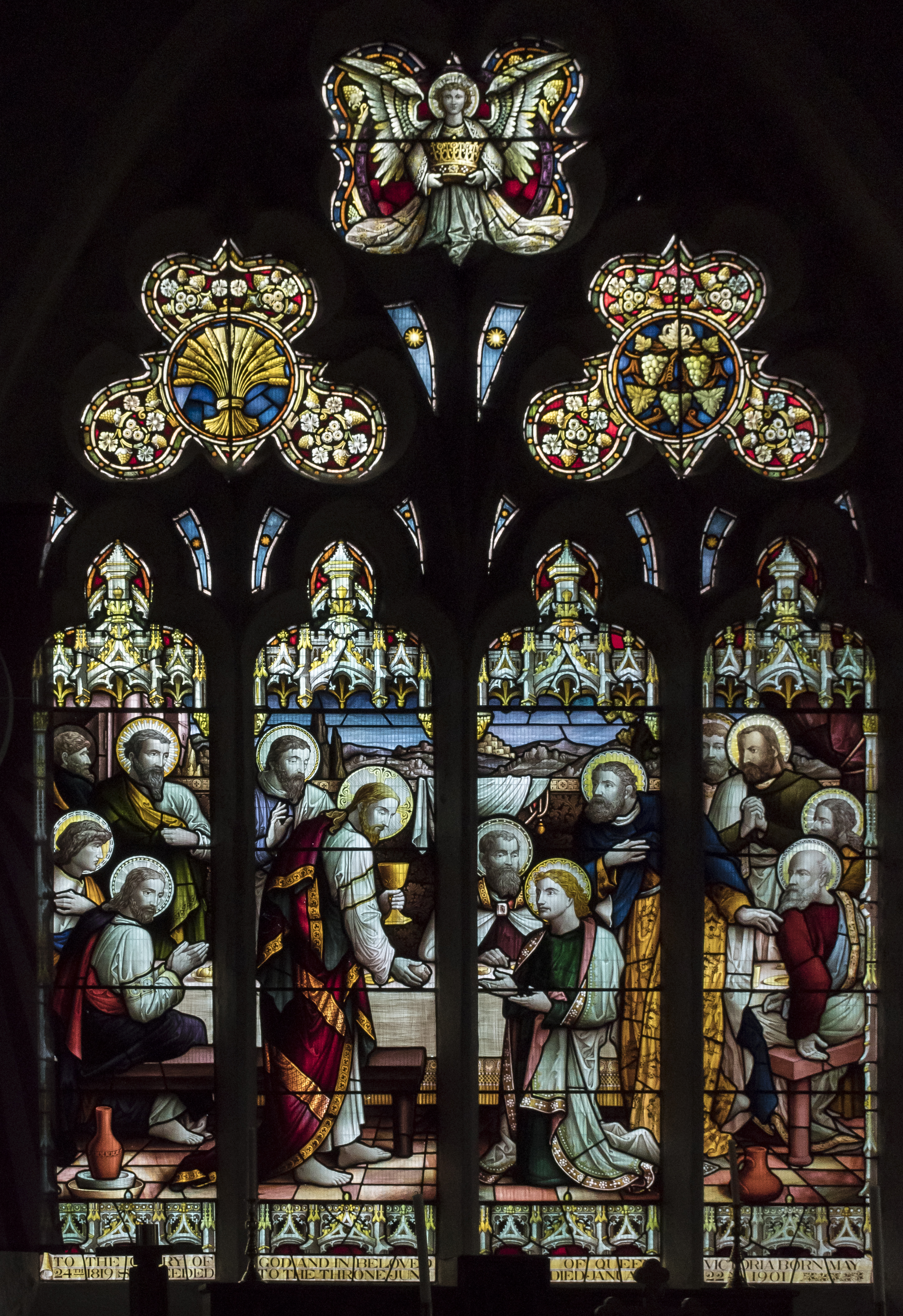
East chancel window by Thomas and Co. depicting the Lord’s Supper

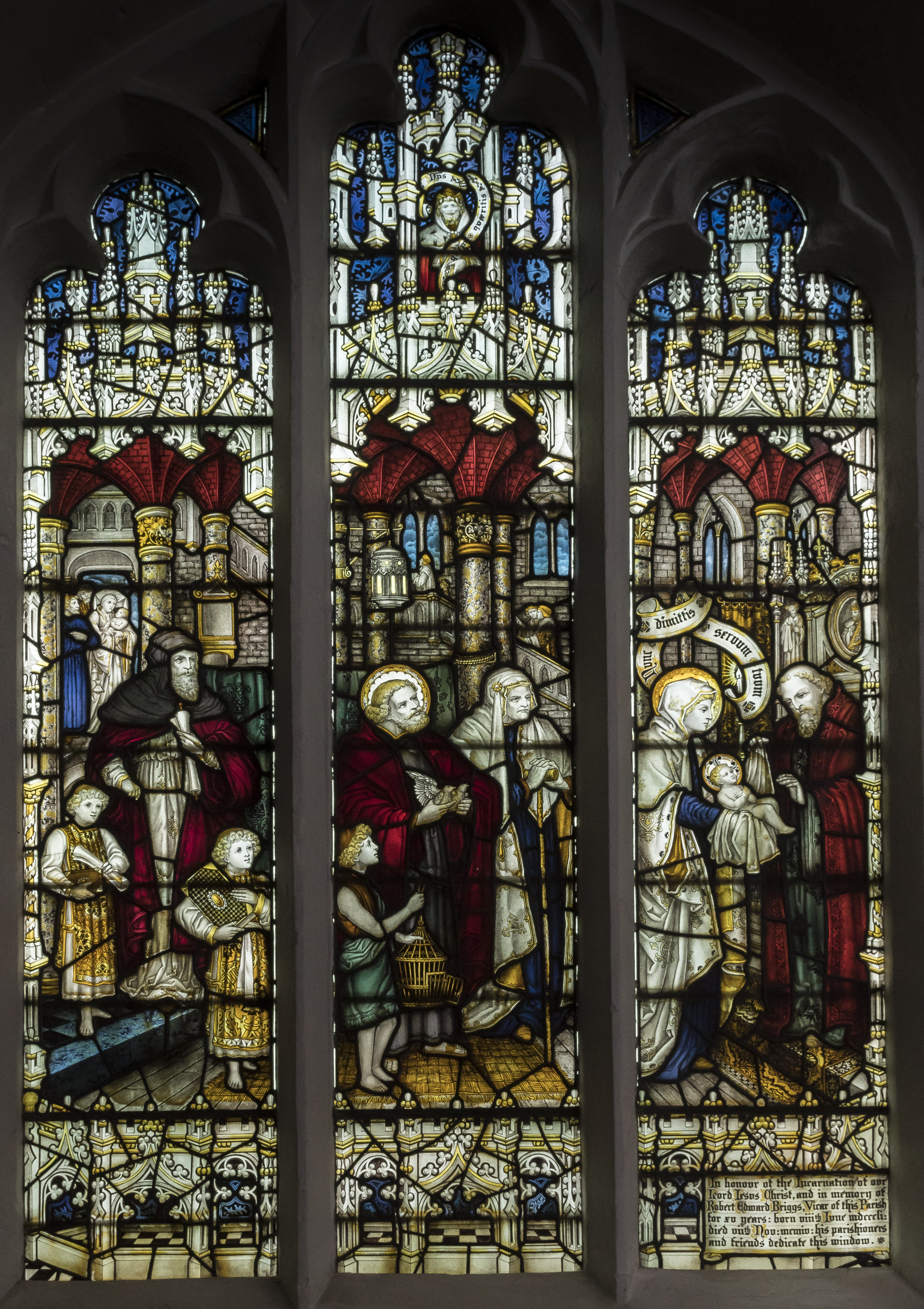
1905 window by C E Kempe & Co. depicting the Presentation in the Temple

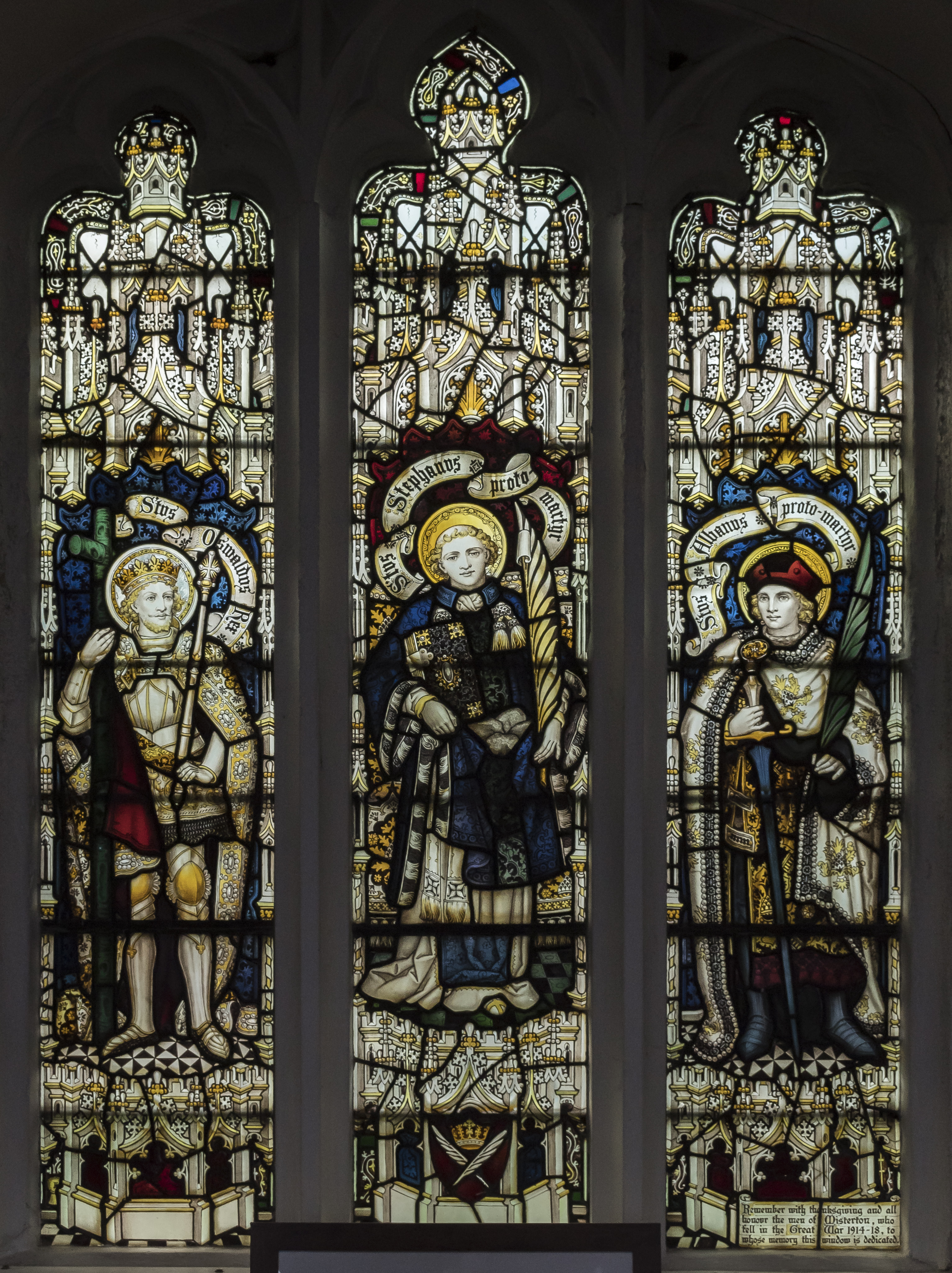
1921 war memorial window by C E Kempe & Co.

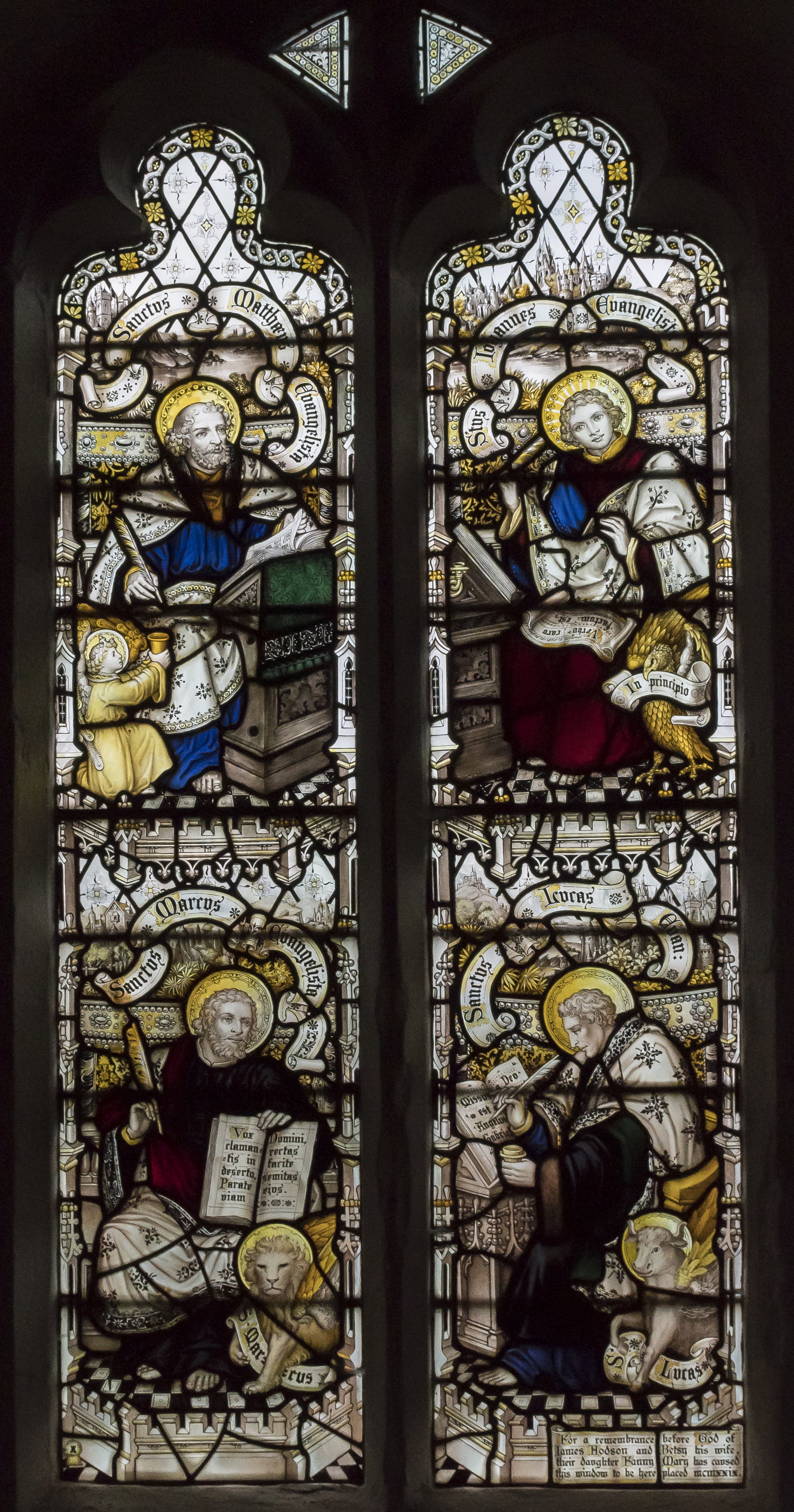
1929 window by C E Kempe & Co. depicting the Four Evangelists

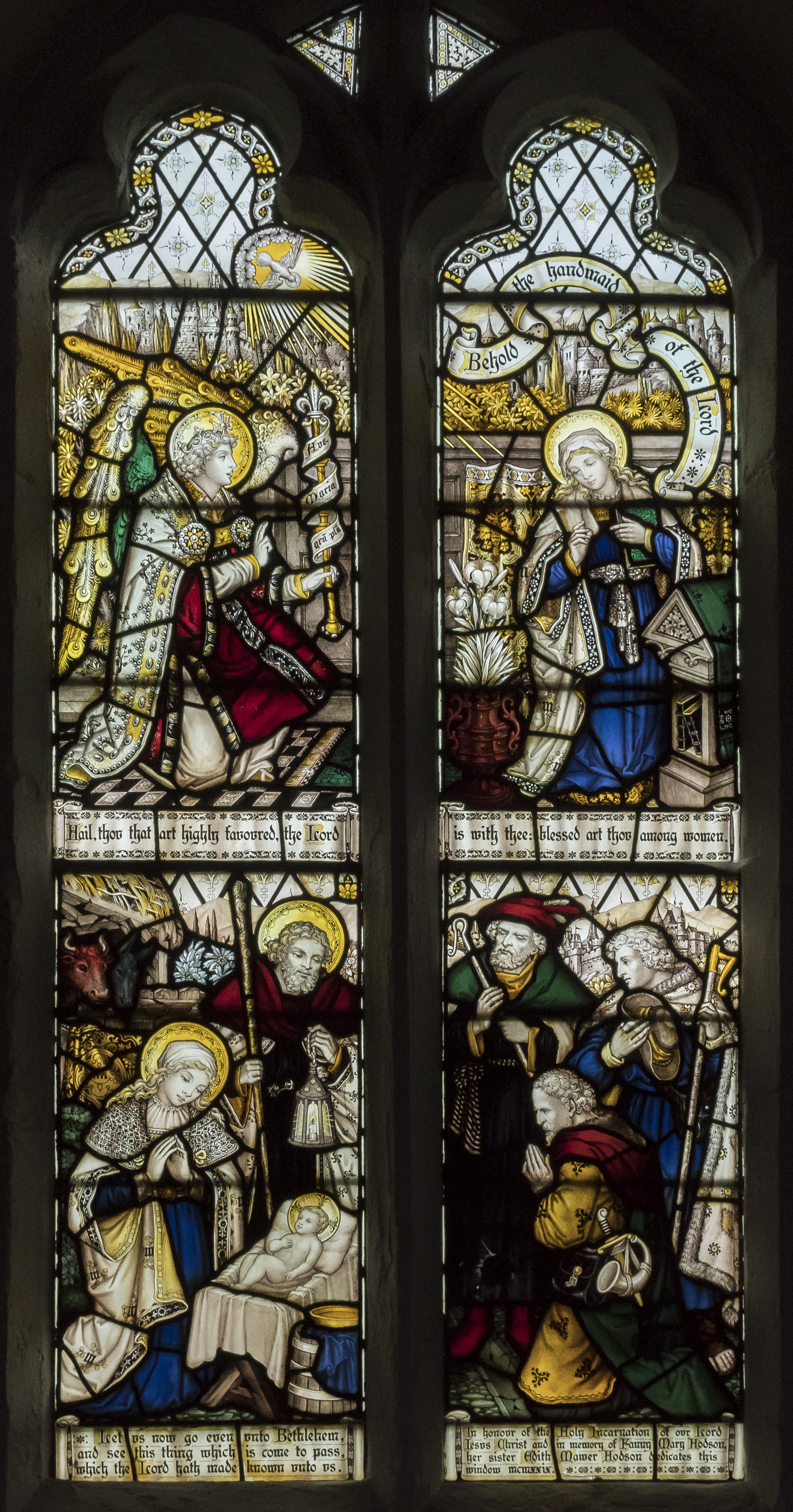
1929 window by C E Kempe & Co. depicting the Annunciation and Adoration of the Shepherds

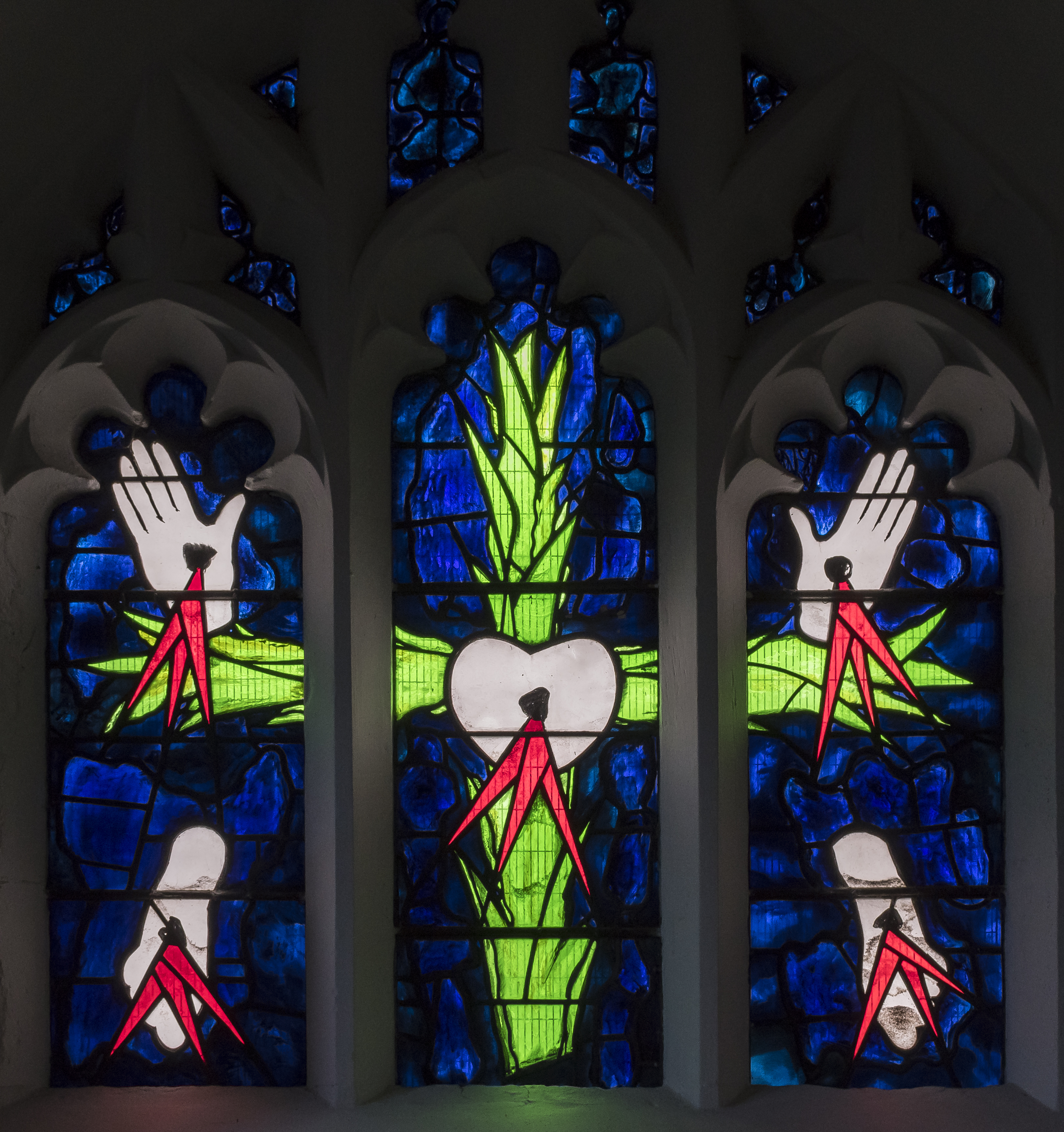
1966 window by John Piper depicting the Five Wounds of Christ

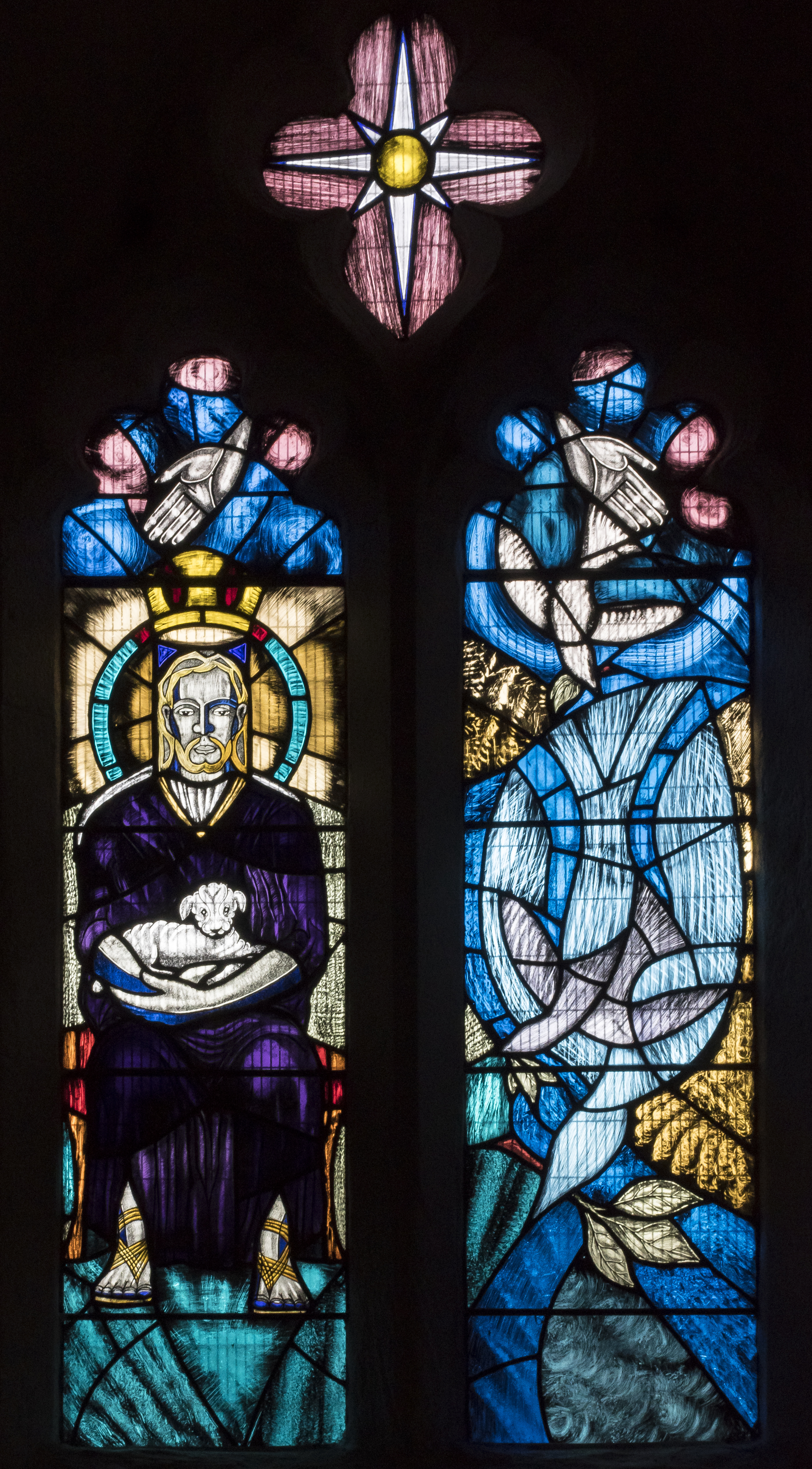
1999 window by David Sear depicting the Good Shepherd

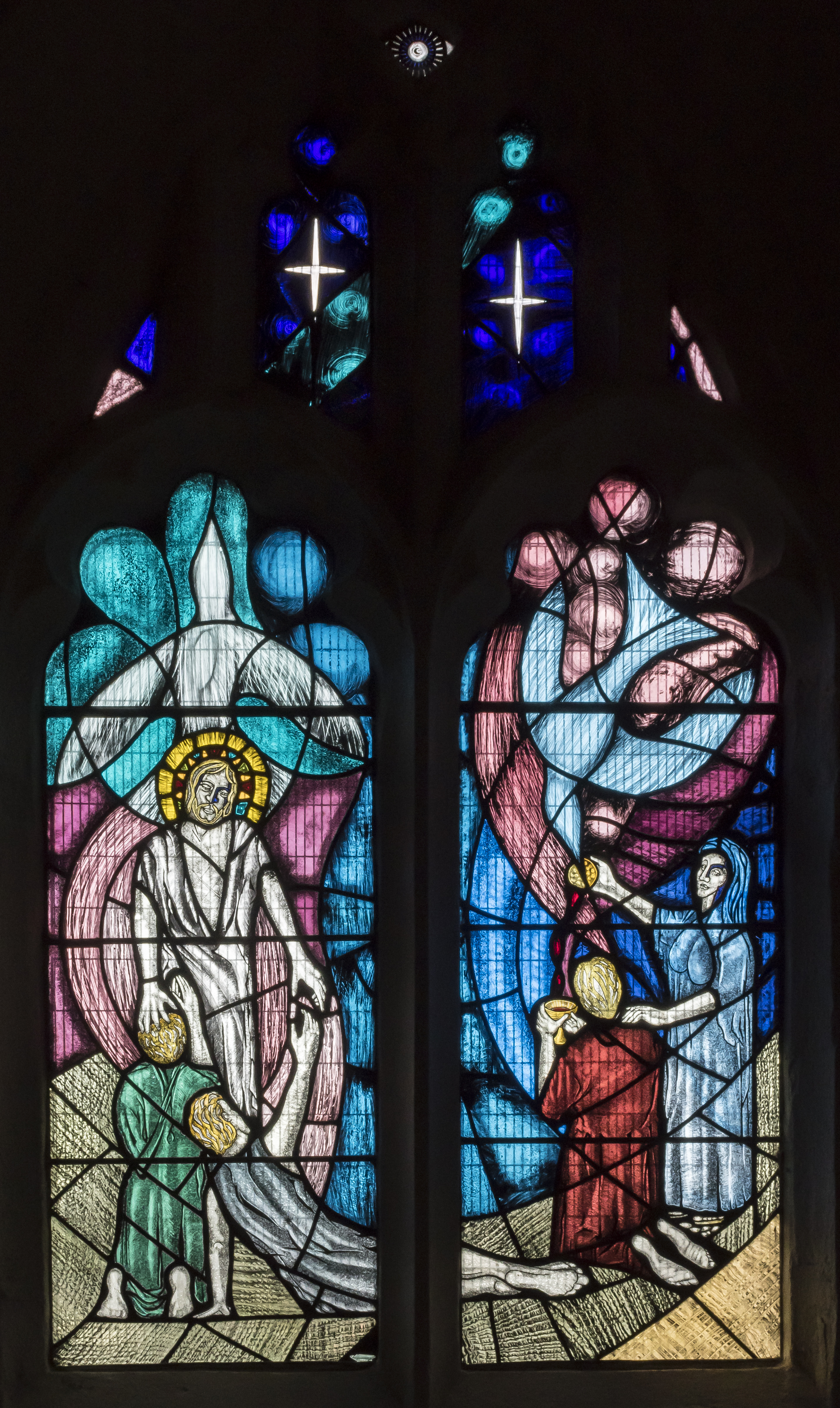
1999 window by David Sear depicting the Eucharist

== See also ==
- Grade I listed buildings in Nottinghamshire
- Listed buildings in Misterton, Nottinghamshire
