= Gainsborough Rural District =

Former local government area in the UK

Coordinates: 53.40°N 0.72°W

Gainsborough
- Gainsborough Rural District shown within Parts of Lindsey in 1970.
- History
  - Created: 1894
  - Abolished: 1974
  - Succeeded by: West Lindsey
- Status: Rural district

Gainsborough was rural district in Lincolnshire, Parts of Lindsey from 1894 to 1974.

It was formed under the Local Government Act 1894 from that part of the Gainsborough rural sanitary district which was in Lindsey (the Nottinghamshire part becoming the Misterton Rural District). It was reduced in 1936 under a County Review Order by ceding the parishes of Haxey, Owston Ferry and West Butterwick, all part of the Isle of Axholme, to the Isle of Axholme Rural District.

It was abolished in 1974 under the Local Government Act 1972, and incorporated into the new district of West Lindsey.
