= St Mary the Virgin's Church, West Stockwith =

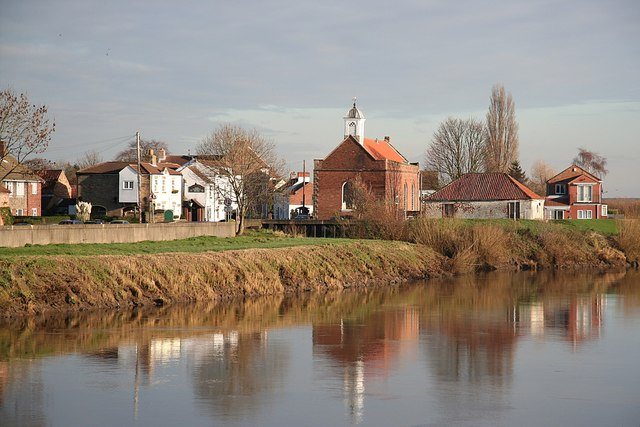
- St Mary the Virgin's Church, West Stockwith
- St Mary the Virgin's Church, West Stockwith
- 53°26′35.71″N 0°48′44.63″W
- OS grid reference: SK 79027 94740
- Location: West Stockwith
- Country: England
- Denomination: Church of England

History
- Dedication: St Mary the Virgin

Architecture
- Heritage designation: Grade II* listed

Administration
- Diocese: Diocese of Southwell and Nottingham
- Archdeaconry: Newark
- Deanery: Bassetlow and Bawtry
- Parish: West Stockwith

St Mary the Virgin's Church, West Stockwith is a Grade II* listed parish church in the Church of England in West Stockwith, Nottinghamshire, England.

== History ==
The church dates from 1722 and was built for William Huntington.

Since 2022, St Mary the Virgin's has belonged to the Oswaldbeck Benefice, a union of six parishes that also includes the following neighbouring churches:

- All Saints' Church, Beckingham
- St Peter's Church, Clayworth
- St Peter & St Paul's Church, Gringley-on-the-Hill
- All Saints' Church, Misterton
- St Mary Magdalene's Church, Walkeringham

== Organ ==
The organ dates from 1906 by Jubb of Gainsborough. A specification of the organ can be found on the National Pipe Organ Register.

== See also ==
- Grade II* listed buildings in Nottinghamshire
- Listed buildings in West Stockwith
