= Listed buildings in Misterton, Nottinghamshire =

Misterton is a civil parish in the Bassetlaw District of Nottinghamshire, England. The parish contains 25 listed buildings that are recorded in the National Heritage List for England. Of these, one is listed at Grade I, the highest of the three grades, two are at Grade II*, the middle grade, and the others are at Grade II, the lowest grade. The parish contains the village of Misterton and the surrounding countryside. Most of the listed buildings are houses, cottages and associated structures, farmhouses and farm buildings. The others include two churches, two road bridges over the River Idle, two bridges over the Chesterfield Canal and a boundary marker by the canal, two pumping engine houses and associated structures, a former railway station, a former school, and a war memorial.

== Key ==
| Grade | Criteria |
|---|---|
| I | Buildings of exceptional interest, sometimes considered to be internationally important |
| II* | Particularly important buildings of more than special interest |
| II | Buildings of national importance and special interest |

== Buildings ==
| Name and location | Photograph | Date | Notes | Grade |
|---|---|---|---|---|
| All Saints' Church; 53.44422°N 0.85015°W | | 13th century | The church has been altered and extended through the centuries, and the steeple was rebuilt in 1847–48 by Weightman and Hadfield. The church is built in stone with lead roofs, and consists of a nave with a clerestory, north and south aisles, a south porch, a chancel and a west steeple. The steeple has a tower with two stages on a chamfered plinth, with buttresses, a lancet window with a hood mould on the west side, bell openings with paired lancets and Y-tracery, and a broach spire with two tiers of lucarnes. | I |
| The Old Vicarage; 53.44464°N 0.84898°W | — | 16th century | The vicarage, later a private house, has a timber framed core, and is clad in rendered brick, it is on a plinth, and has a floor band, cogged eaves at the rear, and a pantile roof with coped gables. There are two storeys and an L-shaped plan, with a main range of three bays. The doorway in an angle has a hood on curved brackets. Most of the windows are sashes, and there are casements and fixed lights. Inside the house is exposed timber framing. | II |
| 8 Church Street; 53.44498°N 0.85173°W | | 17th century | A house in rendered brick, with dentilled eaves, and a pantile roof with coped tumbled gables. There are two storeys and an L-shaped plan, with a front range of two bays, containing sash windows. To the left is a later lean-to extension in pebbledashed brick with a tile roof, containing a doorway with a segmental head and casement windows. | II |
| 103 Station Street; 53.44402°N 0.83773°W | — | 17th century | The house is in timber framing and brick, it is colourwashed, and has dentilled eaves, and a pantile roof. There is a single storey and attics, four bays, and a rear lean-to. On the front are two doorways, and the windows are a mix of casements and horizontally-sliding sashes. | II |
| Church Farm House; 53.44390°N 0.85024°W | — | Early 18th century | The farmhouse is in brick with dentilled eaves, and a pantile roof with brick coped tumbled gables. There are two storeys and four bays. The doorway has a segmental head, and most of the windows are horizontally-sliding sashes. To the right is a two-storey single-bay extension, and beyond that is a later extension with a single storey and an attic. | II |
| 3 and 3A Debdhill Road; 53.44600°N 0.85171°W | — | 18th century | A brick house on a stone plinth, with stone sills, rendered lintels, modillion eaves, and a pantile roof with coped gables and kneelers. There are two storeys and attics, and an L-shaped plan, with a front range of three bays. In the centre is a doorway with a moulded panelled surround, a keystone, and a dentilled triangular pediment, and the windows are sashes. To the left is a lean-to extension containing a door with a segmental head, and casement and sash windows. | II |
| 7 Gringley Road and pigeoncote 53.44352°N 0.85302°W | — | Mid 18th century | The house is in brick, with a floor band, cogged eaves, and a tile roof with brick and stone coped gables and kneelers. There are two storeys and attics, and an L-shaped plan, with a front of three bays. The central doorway has a fanlight, the windows are sashes, and all the openings have segmental heads. At the rear is a brick pigeoncote with a floor band, dentilled eaves, and a pantile roof with a stone coped gable. There are two storeys and a single bay, and a row of pigeonholes at the top. | II |
| Fountain Hill Farm House; 53.43544°N 0.86373°W | — | 18th century | The farmhouse is in brick with stone sills, dentilled eaves, and a pantile roof with stone coped gables and kneelers. There are two storeys and attics, three bays, and a two-storey lean-to rear range. The doorway has a plain surround and a hood on curved brackets, and the windows are sashes with rubbed brick heads. | II |
| Gringley Road Farm House; 53.43606°N 0.85989°W | | Late 18th century | The farmhouse is in brick, with stone sills, rendered lintels, and a pantile roof. There are two storeys and two bays. The central doorway has a moulded surround and a fanlight, and the windows are sashes. | II |
| Haxey Gate Bridge; 53.45721°N 0.84943°W | | Late 18th century | The bridge carries a former road over the River Idle. It is in stone and consists of a single segmental arch. The bridge has square projecting imposts and a parapet, and at the north end is a square stone gate pier. | II |
| Swallow Bridge; 53.44252°N 0.84048°W | | c. 1776 | An accommodation bridge over the Chesterfield Canal, It is in brick with chamfered stone coping, and consists of a single stilted segmental arch. The bridge has curved parapet walls containing four square brick piers with square stone tops. | II |
| Elm Farm House and outbuildings 53.44412°N 0.84680°W | | 1779 | The house is in brick, with stone sills, and a tile roof with brick coped gable and kneelers. There are three storeys, and an L-shaped plan, with a front range of three bays and a rear wing. In the centre is a doorway with a reeded surround, a fanlight, and a hood on curved brackets. The windows on the front are sashes with rubbed brick heads and keystones, and in the left gable is an initialled datestone. Adjoining are a pigeoncote and stable in brick with a pyramidal pantile roof. The pigeoncote has three storeys, and contains a semicircular opening with three tiers of pigeonholes. It is flanked by two bays on each side, with two storeys, and contains stable doors and other openings. | II |
| 11 High Street, wall and railing 53.44414°N 0.84730°W | — | c. 1800 | The house is in rendered brick, with a floor band, dentilled eaves, and a pantile roof with stone coped gables and kneelers. There are two storeys and attics, and an L-shaped plan, with a front range of five bays and a rear wing. In the centre is a doorway with a reeded and panelled surround with paterae, a fanlight, and a moulded cornice, and the windows are sashes. In the rear wing is a doorway with a moulded surround, and a bay window. Along the front is a cast iron spearhead railing and a gate. The boundary walls are in gault brick with terracotta coping, and contain four square gate piers with stone caps and metal gates. | II |
| Boundary Marker; 53.44190°N 0.84322°W | — | Late 18th to early 19th century | The boundary marker is on the south side of the Chesterfield Canal. It consists of an inscribed stone slab post with a pointed head. | II |
| Access bridge, pumping engine houses 53.44740°N 0.82988°W | — | c. 1803 | The road bridge is in brick with stone coping, and it consists of a single stilted segmental arch. It has a stone soffit and imposts, and a curved parapet wall, linking with the boundary wall of the south engine house. | II |
| 27 High Street; 53.44327°N 0.84548°W | — | Early 19th century | A farmhouse and a cottage under a continuous roof, in brick, with dentilled eaves, and a pantile roof with tumbled gables. There are two storeys and four bays, and a single-bay extension on the right. In the farmhouse is a central doorway and sash windows with segmental heads, the cottage has a doorway, a horizontally-sliding sash window and a plain sash window, and in the extension is a doorway with a segmental head and a fixed light. | II |
| North engine house, walkway and cutwaters 53.44725°N 0.82929°W | | Early 19th century | The pumping engine house is in brick on stone foundations, with stone dressings, dentilled eaves, and a slate roof with stone coped gables. There are two storeys and three bays. To the left is a square chimney stack with moulded coping and a moulded stone cap with acroteria. To the right is a round-arched wheel opening, in the east gable is a round-arched opening with imposts, and a keystone, and elsewhere are doorways. The building is linked by an iron walkway to two stone cutwaters and a sluice gate. | II* |
| The Cedars; 53.44566°N 0.84902°W | — | Early 19th century | A house in rendered brick, with stone sill, plain and dentilled eaves, and a pantile roof with stone coped gables and kneelers. There are two storeys, an L-shaped plan, a front range of three bays, and a rear wing. The central doorway has a reeded surround with paterae, and a hood with a dentilled cornice. The windows on the front are sashes with segmental heads, and in the rear wing are casement windows. | II |
| South engine house and boundary wall 53.44710°N 0.82951°W | | 1828 | The pumping engine house is in brick on stone foundations, with stone dressings, a moulded eaves band, and a slate roof with stone coped gables. There are two storeys and three bays. On the west gable end are two casement windows, between which is a datestone. To the right is a square chimney stack with a corbelled stone cap and acroteria. To the north is a lean-to brick wheelhouse, and a timber lean-to, and on the south is a brick lean-to. The curved boundary wall is in brick with stone coping, and it contains two pairs of stone gate piers. | II* |
| Wharf Bridge; 53.44134°N 0.84483°W | | 1830 | The bridge carries Grovewood Road over the Chesterfield Canal. It is in brick with stone dressings, and consists of a single stitled segmental arch. The bridge has a chamfered stone soffit, imposts and a dated keystone. To the west are brick piers carrying a pipe. The brick parapet wall is curved, and contains square brick piers with square stone copings. | II |
| Youth and Community Centre; 53.44241°N 0.84544°W | | 1872 | The school, later used for other purposes, is in red brick on a plinth, with dressings in gault brick and stone, lintel and eaves bands, cogged eaves, and roofs of lead and slate. There is a single storey, a T-shaped plan, and a main range of six bays. To the right is a square two-stage tower with a pyramidal roof and an iron ornament. It contains a doorway with a triangular head and a decorative lintel, above which is a lozenge-shaped datestone, and a clock face. To its left is a mullioned and transomed casement window, with a pointed-arched head, over which is a quatrefoil in the gable. | II |
| Misterton Station House and outbuildings 53.43949°N 0.83298°W | — | c. 1875 | A railway station, later a private house, it is in gault brick on a blue brick plinth, with dressings in red and blue brick and stone, floor bands and a slate roof. There are two storeys, a T-shaped plan, and a front range of four bays, a single-storey single-bay lean-to on the left. The central doorway is blocked, most of the windows are sashes with segmental heads, and there is a glazed timber canopy with a decorative valance. To the right is a ticket office and a toilet block. | II |
| Gate piers and gate, Misterton Station House; 53.44039°N 0.83314°W | | c. 1875 | The gate piers and gate are in cast and wrought iron. The piers are octagonal with pointed octagonal caps, and the gate has five bars, diagonal bracing and tie rods. | II |
| Misterton Methodist Church; 53.44356°N 0.84659°W | | 1878 | The church is in red brick on a plinth, with dressings in blue brick, gault brick and stone, two string courses, a sill band, a moulded cornice, cogged and dentilled eaves, a stone coped parapet and gable, and five projecting pilaster caps. There are two storeys and three bays, the bays flanked by gault brick pilasters with Corinthian capitals. The central round-arched doorway has polished granite shafts with moulded bases and foliate capitals, a fanlight, a keystone and a hood mould. Above are paired round-arched windows in a round-arched opening, with granite shafts and a dated roundel, above which is a quatrefoil. The outer bays contain tall round-arched windows with hood moulds. On the south side are two tiers of casement windows. | II |
| War memorial 53.44415°N 0.84961°W | | 1922 | The war memorial stands in an enclosure by a road junction. It is in granite, and consists of a Celtic cross head on a tapering shaft, on a tapering square plinth, on a base of two square steps. On the front of the plinth is an inscription and the names of those lost in the First World War, and on the top step is another inscription. The base of the shaft carries an inscription and the names of those lost in the Second World War. | II |
