= Listed buildings in Clayworth =

Clayworth is a civil parish in the Bassetlaw District of Nottinghamshire, England. The parish contains 18 listed buildings that are recorded in the National Heritage List for England. Of these, one is listed at Grade I, the highest of the three grades, and the others are at Grade II, the lowest grade. The parish contains the village of Clayworth and the surrounding area. The Chesterfield Canal runs through the parish, and the listed buildings associated with it are a bridge, a warehouse and two mileposts. The other listed buildings consist of houses, cottages and associated structures, farmhouses and farm buildings, a former chapel, and a church and monuments in the churchyard.

== Key ==
| Grade | Criteria |
|---|---|
| I | Buildings of exceptional interest, sometimes considered to be internationally important |
| II | Buildings of national importance and special interest |

== Buildings ==
| Name and location | Photograph | Date | Notes | Grade |
|---|---|---|---|---|
| St Peter's Church; 53.38774°N 0.90940°W | | 12th century | The church has been altered and extended through the centuries, and it was restored in 1874–75 by John Oldrid Scott. It is built in stone, with roofs of lead, slate and tile. The church consists of a nave with a clerestory, north and south aisles, a south porch, a chancel with north and south chapels and a vestry, and a west tower. The tower has two stages, a string course, a south clock face, an eaves band with masks and eight gargoyles, and an embattled parapet with eight crocketed pinnacles. | I |
| Royston Manor House; 53.38570°N 0.91135°W | — | 1588 | The manor house, which was rebuilt in 1891 and was at one time a hotel, is in rendered brick and stone on a plinth, with quoins, rendered eaves, a balustrade, and a hipped pantile roof with coped gables and kneelers. There are two storeys and six bays, and a rear link to a two-storey two-bay service wing. Most of the windows are mullioned and transomed casements. The main south front has three projecting full-height gabled bay windows and a lean-to porch. In the west front is a doorway with a chamfered surround and a fanlight, and the east front has a lean-to porch and a doorway with a moulded surround and a Tudor arch. | II |
| Manor House; 53.38981°N 0.91209°W | — | 17th century | The house, which has been extended, is in brick and stone on a plinth, with stone dressings, dentilled eaves, and a hipped pantile roof. There are two storeys and a square plan. The main, west, front has a central doorway with a fanlight and a hood on scrolled brackets, and the windows are sashes with keystones. In the south front are two doorways with fanlights, and casement windows, all with segmental heads. | II |
| Hall Farm House; 53.38578°N 0.90639°W | | Mid 18th century | The farmhouse is in brick with a floor band, cogged and dentilled eaves, and a pantile roof with a coped gable at the rear. There are two storeys, and an L-shaped plan, with a front range of three bays, and the entry is at the rear. In the centre is a doorway converted into a window, with a hood on scrolled brackets, above which is a segmental-arched recess. The windows are sashes with segmental heads. | II |
| The Grange and wall 53.38289°N 0.90653°W | | 18th century | The farmhouse is in brick with a floor band, an eaves band, cogged and dentilled eaves, and a pantile roof with tumbled coped gables. There are two storeys and attics, and an L-shaped plan, with a front range of five bays, and a service wing to the south with two storeys and a single bay. In the centre is a doorway with a reeded and moulded surround, a fanlight, and a dentilled cornice and pediment on curved brackets. The windows on the front are sashes, and in the service wing is a doorway and a casement window, and all have segmental heads. Outside the farmhouse is a ramped brick boundary wall with stone coping about 20 metres (66 ft) long. | II |
| The Old Rectory; 53.38825°N 0.90986°W | — | 18th century | The rectory, later a private house, is in brick, partly rendered, on a stone plinth, with cogged and rebated eaves, and hipped slate roofs. There are two storeys, and an L-shaped plan, with a front of five bays. The middle bay of the west front projects and contains two round-headed recesses. On the south front is a round-headed doorway with a moulded surround, a traceried ogee fanlight, and a reeded lintel and keystone. To its left is a canted bay window, and the other windows on the front are sashes. On the east front is a bay window and a rustic porch with a slate roof. | II |
| Otter's Bridge; 53.38403°N 0.91148°W | | c. 1774–76 | The bridge carries St Peter's Lane over the Chesterfield Canal. It is in brick with stone coping, and consists of a single segmental arch. The bridge has a projecting arch ring, springing stones to the arch, rendered voussoirs, and swept wings ending in piers. | II |
| 65 and 67 Town Street; 53.38699°N 0.90870°W | — | Late 18th century | A pair of cottages in rendered brick on a plinth, with a floor band, and a pantile roof with a coped gable on the left. There are two storeys and three bays. On the front are two doorways and sash windows, some of which are horizontally-sliding, and some have segmental heads. | II |
| Rose Cottage; 53.38841°N 0.91080°W | | Late 18th century | The cottage is in brick, partly rendered, on a plinth, with a floor band, cogged eaves, and a pantile roof with coped gables. There are two storeys, two bays, and a continuous rear outshut. On the front is a doorway flanked by sash windows, all with segmental heads, and in the upper floor are casement windows. | II |
| Canal warehouse and Field Farm House; 53.37769°N 0.89440°W | | c. 1800 | The former warehouse and the farmhouse are in brick, with cogged eaves, an eaves band, and pantile roofs. There are two storeys, the farmhouse on the left has two bays, and the warehouse has three. Both parts have doorways and casement windows, and in the warehouse is a taking-in door. | II |
| Canal milepost near Field Farm; 53.37705°N 0.89404°W | | Late 18th to early 19th century | The milepost on the Chesterfield Canal consists of a stone slab post. It is slightly tapered towards the top and has a flat head, rounded at the edges. The milepost is inscribed with "36", the distance in miles from Chesterfield. | II |
| Canal milepost near Otter's Bridge; 53.38339°N 0.91044°W | | Late 18th to early 19th century | The milepost on the Chesterfield Canal consists of a stone slab post. It has a flat head, rounded at the edges, and is inscribed with "37", the distance in miles from Chesterfield. | II |
| Monument south of St Peter's Church; 53.38766°N 0.90952°W | | c. 1821 | The monument is in the churchyard to the south of the south aisle, and is in stone. It consists of a sarcophagus with a pyramidal top on ball feet, standing on a chamfered square base with a moulded plinth. | II |
| The Old Chapel; 53.38610°N 0.90725°W | | 1824 | The former Methodist chapel is in brick, the gable end facing the road is rendered, and it is on a plinth, with quoins, an eaves band, dentilled eaves, and a pantile roof with a coped gable. There is a single storey and two bays. In the centre is a doorway in a round-headed arch, flanked by round-headed sash windows, and in the gable is an inscribed and dated plaque. | II |
| Clayworth Hall and outbuilding 53.38746°N 0.90762°W | — | Early 19th century | The house is stuccoed, on a stone plinth, and has a hipped slate roof. There are two storeys and five bays, the middle three bays projecting. In the centre is a doorway with a moulded surround, the bases of pilasters, and a fanlight. This is flanked by French windows, and the other windows are sashes with segmental heads. A the rear is a central door with a fanlight, over which is a round-headed stair window. To the southwest is a rendered outbuilding with a single storey and two bays. | II |
| Monument north of St Peter's Church; 53.38783°N 0.90939°W | | Early 19th century | The monument is in the churchyard to the north of the church, and is in stone. It consists of a draped urn on a truncated obelisk, standing on a square base with two steps and a chamfered plinth. | II |
| Farm buildings, The Grange; 53.38263°N 0.90685°W | | Early 19th century | The farm buildings, which have been converted for residential use, are in brick with dentilled eaves and pantile roofs. The buildings were originally a cow house to the left, and a barn with nine bays, containing a pair of barn doors under a segmental relieving arch, other doors, pitching holes and vents. To the right was a stable, then a coach house with a pigeoncote above, and at the end was a bull pen. | II |
| Boundary wall, St Peter's Church; 53.38749°N 0.90942°W | | 19th century | The wall enclosing the churchyard is in stone with saddleback coping, it incorporates a large dressed boulder, and extends for about 200 metres (660 ft). There are two entrances that have a wrought iron overthrow and a cross. | II |
