= All Saints' Church, Beckingham =

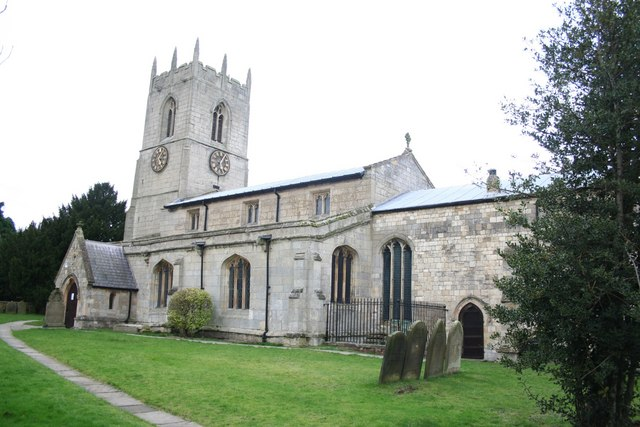
- All Saints' Church, Beckingham
- All Saints' Church, Beckingham
- 53°24′13″N 0°49′47″W
- OS grid reference: SK 77900 90293
- Location: Beckingham, Nottinghamshire
- Country: England
- Denomination: Church of England

History
- Dedication: All Saints

Architecture
- Heritage designation: Grade II* listed

Administration
- Province: York
- Diocese: Diocese of Southwell and Nottingham
- Archdeaconry: Newark
- Deanery: Bassetlow and Bawtry
- Parish: Beckingham

Clergy
- Vicar: Rev D Henson

All Saints' Church, Beckingham is a Grade II* listed parish church in the Church of England in Beckingham, Nottinghamshire, England.

== History ==
The church dates from the 13th century. It was restored by Ewan Christian in 1892.

Since 2022, All Saints’ has belonged to the Oswaldbeck Benefice, a union of six parishes that also includes the following neighbouring churches:

- St Peter's Church, Clayworth
- St Peter & St Paul's Church, Gringley-on-the-Hill
- All Saints' Church, Misterton
- St Mary Magdalene's Church, Walkeringham
- St Mary the Virgin's Church, West Stockwith

== Organ ==
The organ dates from 1847. A specification of the organ can be found on the National Pipe Organ Register.

== See also ==
- Grade II* listed buildings in Nottinghamshire
- Listed buildings in Beckingham, Nottinghamshire
