= West Stockwith =

Village and civil parish in Nottinghamshire, England

Coordinates: 53.444°N 0.811°W

- Village and civil parish
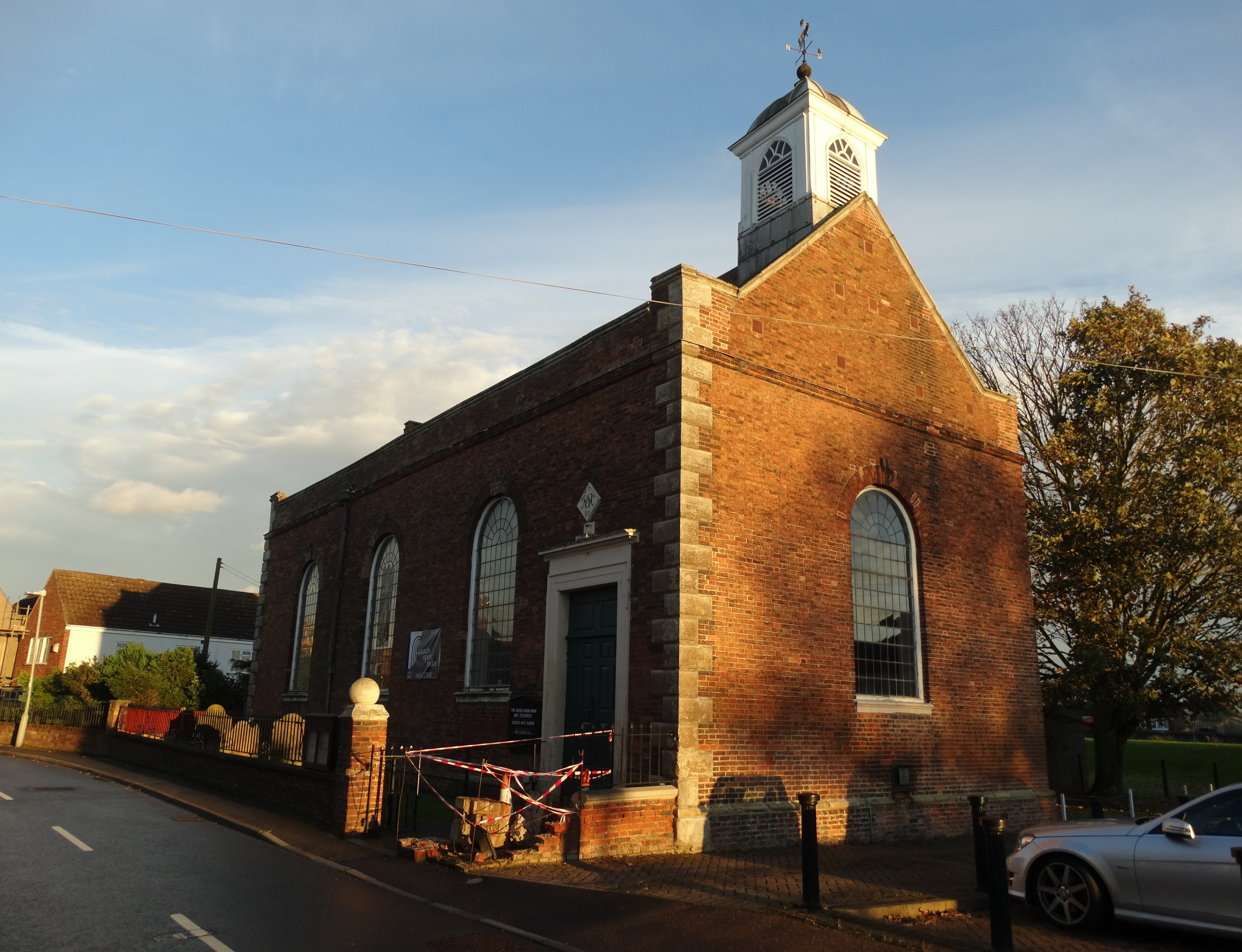
- Church of St Mary the Virgin in West Stockwith

- Location within Nottinghamshire
- Interactive map of West Stockwith
- Area: 1.37 sq mi (3.5 km^{2})
- Population: 335 (2021)
  - Density: 245/sq mi (95/km^{2})
- OS grid reference: SK 790947
  - London: 135 mi (217 km) SSE
- District: Bassetlaw
- Shire county: Nottinghamshire
- Region: East Midlands
- Country: England
- Sovereign state: United Kingdom
- Post town: DONCASTER
- Postcode district: DN10
- Dialling code: 01427
- Police: Nottinghamshire
- Fire: Nottinghamshire
- Ambulance: East Midlands
- UK Parliament: Bassetlaw
- Website: www.west-stockwith-parish-council.org.uk

West Stockwith is a village within the Bassetlaw district of Nottinghamshire, England. The population at the 2011 census was 327, this increased to 335 at the 2021 census. It lies on the west bank of the River Trent, 3 miles (4.8 km) north-west of Gainsborough and 1.5 miles (2.4 km) east of Misterton. West Stockwith is an ecclesiastical parish in the Church of England Diocese of Southwell and Nottingham with the parish church of St Mary the Virgin's Church, West Stockwith being built in 1722.

East Stockwith is a settlement on the other side of the Trent, but within the county boundaries of Lincolnshire. The two villages were once linked together by a passenger ferry.

== Etymology ==
Unlike other places in the region which have "with" in their names, which is usually from Old Norse víðr "wood", cognate with Old English wudu "wood", the second element here is Old Norse vað "ford, river crossing", as seen in Wath upon Dearne. The first element is less clear: it is either Old English stocc "tree-trunk" or stoc "village, outlying farmstead" (as seen in Stoke-on-Trent and Stoke Poges. The name was recorded as Wessockiv in 1139.

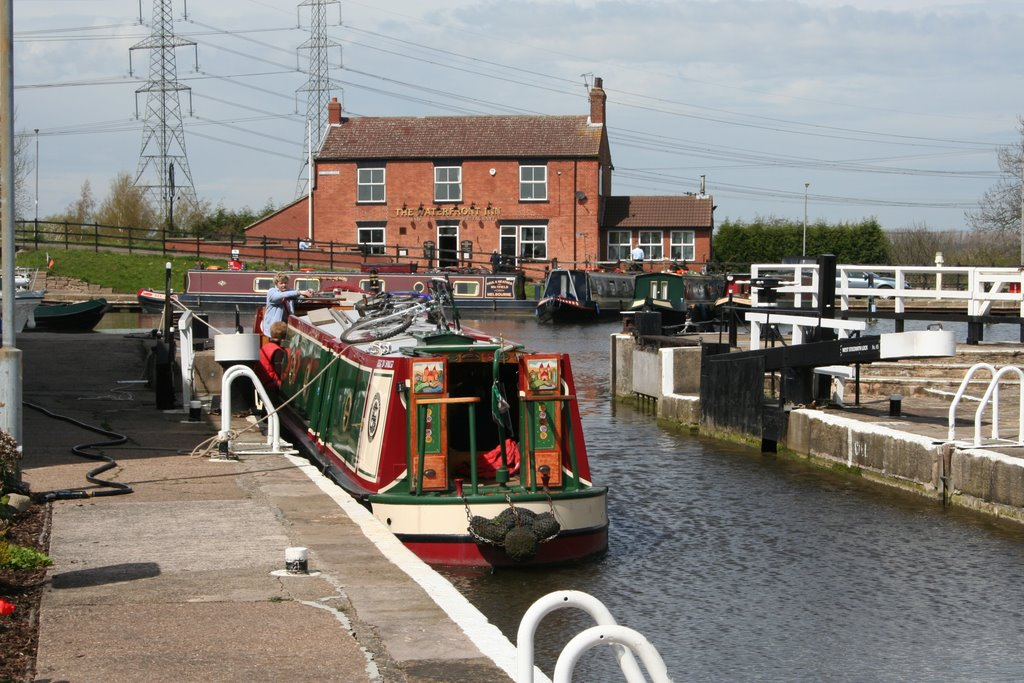
Canal boat in West Stockwith Lock

== West Stockwith today ==
Today West Stockwith is a village with one main street and a few side roads, one cul-de-sac of former farm-workers' houses and another the former vicarage. There are signs still of its industrial past with the well-preserved Water Lanes which allow access from the road to the banks of the River Trent, even via a ginnel under part of one property. The industry related to the River has gone, so too the original work related to the Chesterfield Canal which reaches the Trent at the Basin. This is now the home of river cruisers and narrow boats for hire and for leisure. The river was once home to many of the workers and there were once more than eleven public houses, many in the front rooms of today's cottages, which still contain evidence of their past use. Only two pubs remain although the Yacht Club in the basin caters to boat owners and holds various events over the year. The Hospital Day which was traditionally held in July to raise money by children dressing up and decorating floats, usually farmers' wagons, is no more. Of the industry that replaced that related to the water, there are local grass and potato merchants and the former Trent-side Chemical works is now an industrial park with a variety of businesses, from engineering and motor-cycle related works to some boat building enterprises. The school has also closed and both that building and the former masters' premises are now private houses.

== See also ==
- Listed buildings in West Stockwith
