= East Retford Rural District =

Former local government area in the UK

Coordinates: 53.35°N 0.92°W

- East Retford Rural District shown within Nottinghamshire in 1970.
- History
  - Created: 1894
  - Abolished: 1974
  - Succeeded by: Bassetlaw; Metropolitan Borough of Doncaster
- Status: Rural district

East Retford was a rural district in Nottinghamshire, England from 1894 to 1974.

It was formed under the Local Government Act 1894 from East Retford rural sanitary district. It entirely surrounded Retford, which was a municipal borough itself.

In 1935 it took in the area of the Misterton Rural District under a County Review Order.

The district survived until 1974 when it was abolished under the Local Government Act 1972. It went to form part of the new Bassetlaw district of Nottinghamshire, except the Finningley parish which became part of the Metropolitan Borough of Doncaster in South Yorkshire.
