= Beckingham, Nottinghamshire =

Village and civil parish in Nottinghamshire, England

Coordinates: 53.40°N 0.83°W

Beckingham
- Village and Civil parish
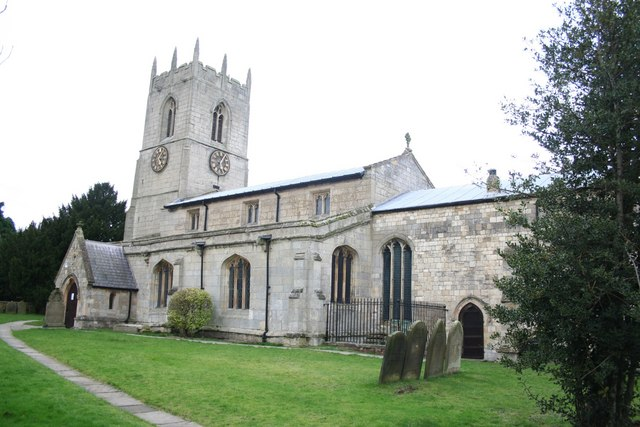
- All Saints' Church

- Location within Nottinghamshire
- Interactive map of Beckingham
- Area: 4.13 sq mi (10.7 km^{2})
- Population: 1,288 (2021)
  - Density: 312/sq mi (120/km^{2})
- OS grid reference: SK7890
  - London: 135 mi (217 km) SE
- District: Bassetlaw
- Shire county: Nottinghamshire
- Region: East Midlands
- Country: England
- Sovereign state: United Kingdom
- Post town: DONCASTER
- Postcode district: DN10
- Dialling code: 01427
- Police: Nottinghamshire
- Fire: Nottinghamshire
- Ambulance: East Midlands
- UK Parliament: Bassetlaw
- Website: www.beckinghamcumsaundby-pc.gov.uk

Beckingham is a village and civil parish in the Bassetlaw district of Nottinghamshire, England, about three miles west of Gainsborough. According to the 2001 census it had a population of 1,168, reducing to 1,098 in 2011 but increasing to 1,288 in 2021.

== History ==
Most of All Saints' Church was built in the 13th century, though the exterior is possibly from the 15th century. The west tower has buttresses, battlements, gargoyles and pinnacles. There is a north chancel chapel and sedilia. It is a Grade II* listed building.

A tower windmill was built some time prior to 1840 to the north of the village (grid reference SK772904). The tower was straight-sided. In 1841 the mill had 2 pairs of millstones driven by 4 common sails, described as "self-regulating cloth and rollers to the sails". By 1850 the mill had been fitted with a pair of patent sails, retaining one pair of rollers; these drove 3 pairs of millstones.

Although an independent parish, it still shares a parish council with neighbouring Saundby.

Sale of mill in 1777 To be Sold to the beſt Bidder; On Thurſday the Eleventh Day of September 1777, between the Hours of Five and Seven in the Afternoon, at the Marquis of Granby in Gainſburgh, in the County of Lincoln. A Well Accuſtomed Corn WIND MILL, ſituate at Beckingham in the County of Nottingham, with a Dreſſing Mill therein. and the Ground whereon the ſame doth ſtand, with a new erected Brick and Tile Dwelling Houſe, Barn, and Stable to the ſame belonging and adjoining. For further Particulars enquire of Leonard Billet the Tenand, who will ſhew the Premiſſes.

— Stamford Mercury 21 Aug. 1777 p.4 col.1

== Beckingham Marshes ==
Beckingham Marshes is a RSPB nature reserve. Nearby, there is a crude oil and gas production field run by IGas Energy. The wells in the field were fracked using the older, less controversial technique.

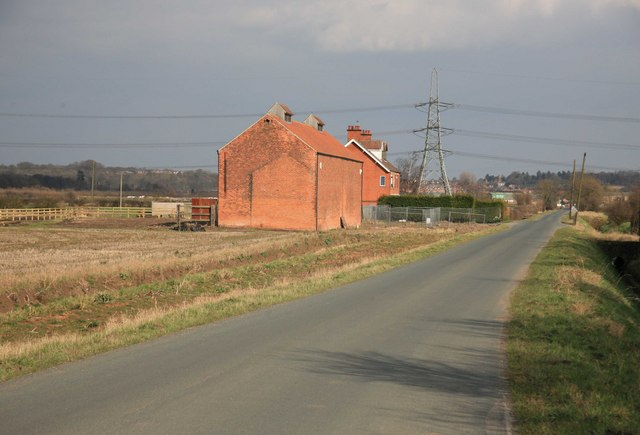
Old Willow Works – Beckingham Marshes

== See also ==
- Listed buildings in Beckingham, Nottinghamshire
- East Midlands Oil Province
