= Walkeringham =

Coordinates: 53°25′24″N 0°50′37″W

- Village and civil parish
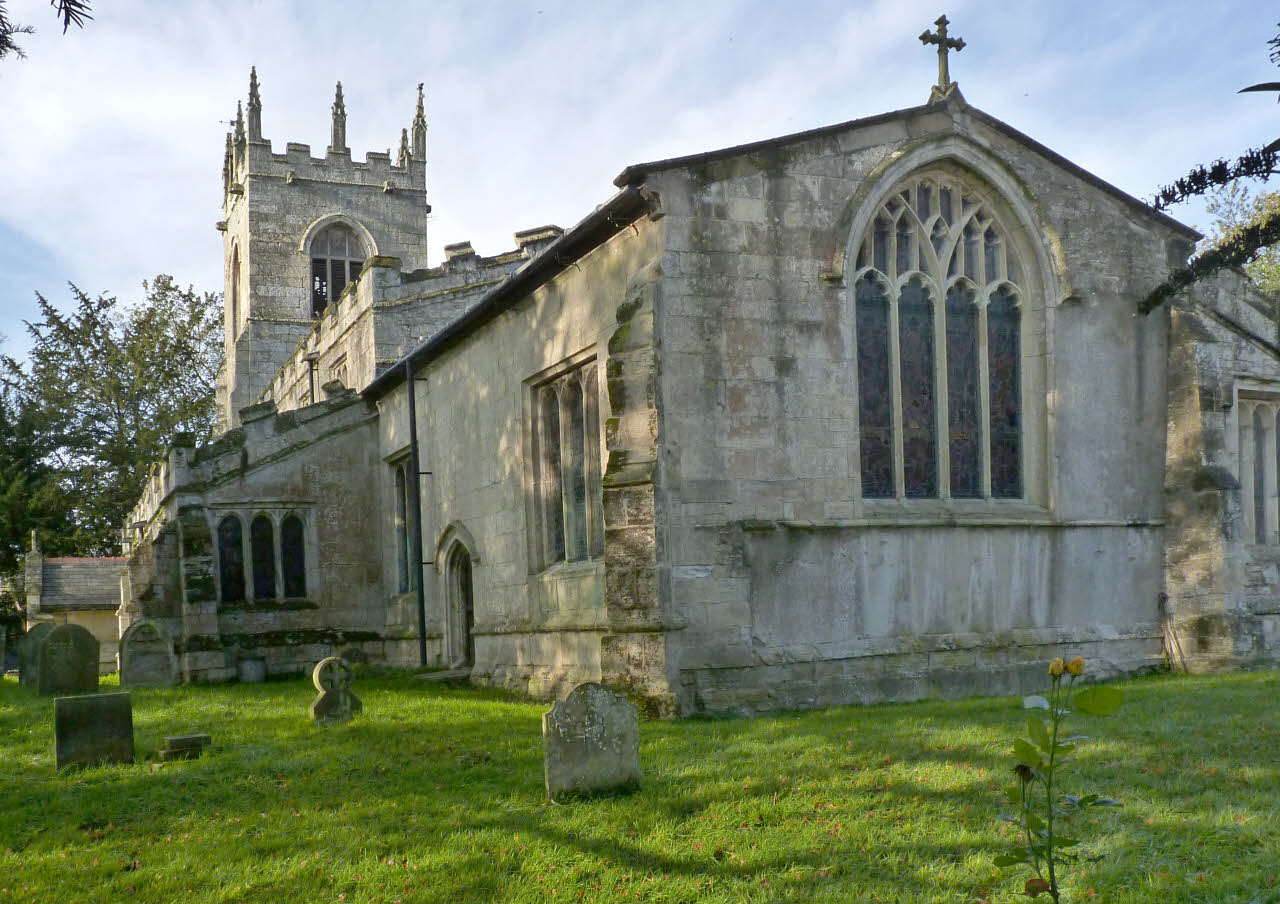
- Church of St Mary Magdalene, Walkeringham

- Location within Nottinghamshire
- Interactive map of Walkeringham
- Area: 4.74 sq mi (12.3 km^{2})
- Population: 1,118 (2021)
  - Density: 236/sq mi (91/km^{2})
- OS grid reference: SK 771923
  - London: 135 mi (217 km) SSE
- District: Bassetlaw
- Shire county: Nottinghamshire
- Region: East Midlands
- Country: England
- Sovereign state: United Kingdom
- Post town: DONCASTER
- Postcode district: DN10
- Dialling code: 01427
- Police: Nottinghamshire
- Fire: Nottinghamshire
- Ambulance: East Midlands
- UK Parliament: Bassetlaw
- Website: walkeringham.info

Walkeringham is a village and civil parish in Nottinghamshire, England. According to the 2001 census it had a population of 908, increasing to 1,022 at the 2011 census, and additionally to 1,118 at the 2021 census. The parish church of St Mary Magdalen is 13th century. It has one public house: The Fox and Hounds.

Southmoor lodge, employs 29 local people to care for 40 older people. It also has a former station house (now a private residence) and a level crossing across Station Road. The end of Station Road is cut off by the River Trent. Walkeringham's housing was extended in the mid-1960s to accommodate the workers of West Burton Power Station. The village also has a small school, which has recently been extended with a new hall (2010).

== Toponymy ==
The place-name Walkeringham seems to contain an Old English personal name Walhhere, + -ingas (Old English) meaning the people of . . . ; the people called after . . . , + hām (Old English) a village, a village community, a manor, an estate, a homestead., etc, so possibly ‘village of the people of a man called Walhhere.

Walkeringham appears in the Domesday survey of 1086 as Wacheringeham and as Wacheringham.

== See also ==
- Listed buildings in Walkeringham
