= Scaftworth =

Hamlet and civil parish in Nottinghamshire, England

Coordinates: 53.418°N 1.001°W

- Civil parish
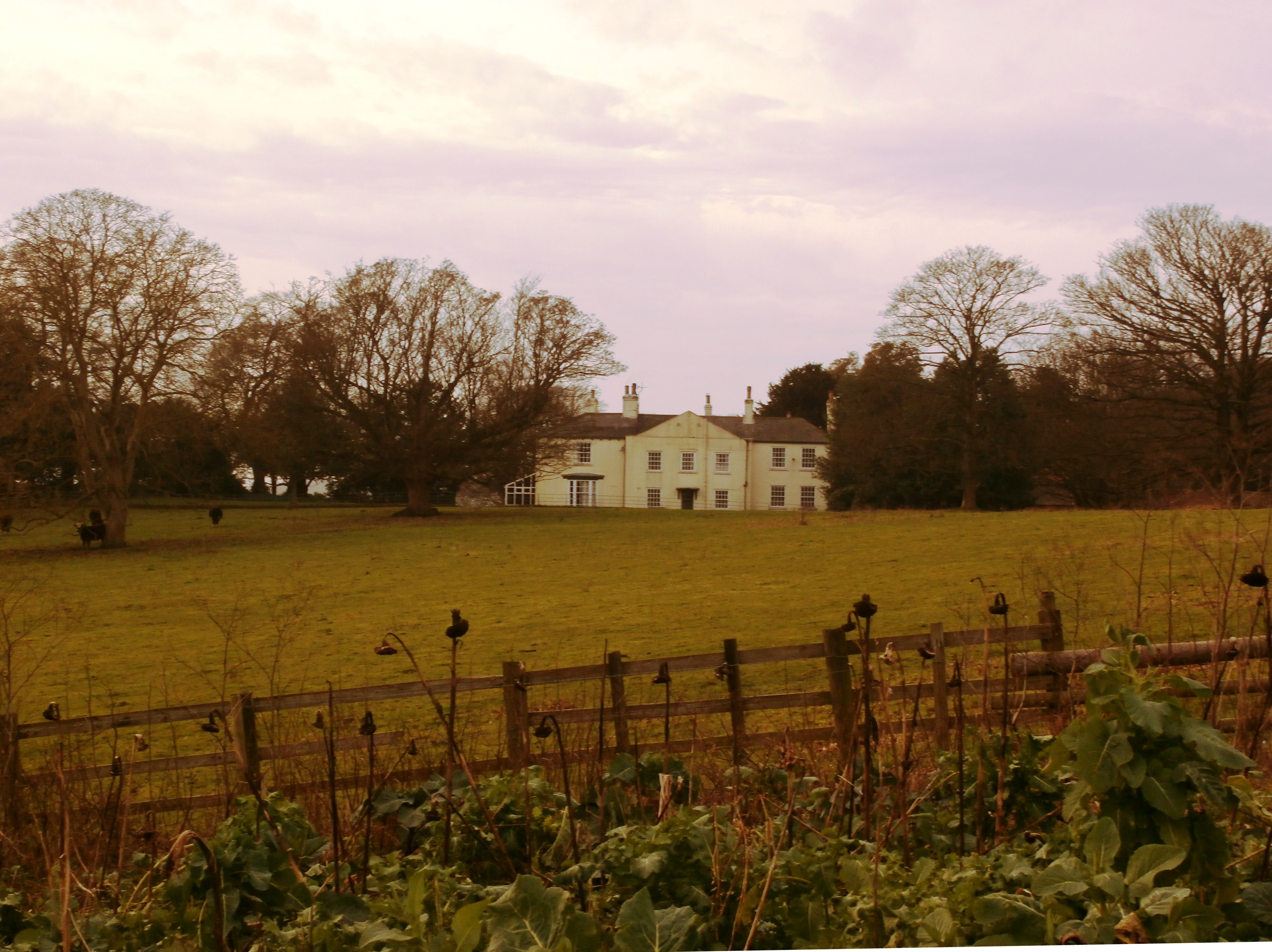
- Scaftworth Hall

- Location within Nottinghamshire
- Interactive map of Scaftworth
- Area: 1.66 sq mi (4.3 km^{2})
- Population: 44 (Census 2021)
  - Density: 27/sq mi (10/km^{2})
- OS grid reference: SK 66474 91708
  - London: 135 mi (217 km) SE
- District: Bassetlaw
- Shire county: Nottinghamshire
- Region: East Midlands
- Country: England
- Sovereign state: United Kingdom
- Post town: DONCASTER
- Postcode district: DN10
- Dialling code: 01302
- Police: Nottinghamshire
- Fire: Nottinghamshire
- Ambulance: East Midlands
- UK Parliament: Bassetlaw

Scaftworth is a hamlet and civil parish within the Bassetlaw district of north Nottinghamshire, England.

== Geography ==
The area is 1 mile south east of Bawtry, 10 miles north east of Worksop, and 33 miles north of Nottingham.

Within Nottinghamshire, Misson bounds Scaftworth to the north east, Scrooby to the south west, Mattersey to the south, Everton to the east.

Austerfield and Bawtry, both in the county of South Yorkshire lie to the north and west.

The A631 Sheffield-Gainsborough-Louth road passes through the parish, with the settlement itself some 200–400 metres away from the road. The A631 bypass was built in 1936.

Predominantly, the parish is a scattering of farms, farmhouses and cottages amongst a wider rural setting. The core centre residences are mainly grouped around a village only access road called Village Street to the south of the A631 road.

The area is very low-lying at nearly sea level, with the exception of the area around Scaftworth Hall at 10 metres (33 ft) and Barrow Hills at 40 metres (130 ft). Forested areas include Cobblety Row and Ling's Wood to the south of the village, and Barrow Hills to the east.

The River Idle forms the western and northern boundary of the parish, as well as the county border, and runs alongside the village area. Due to the overall low elevation, the area is well known for flooding during periods of high rainfall because of the river's proximity, although this has been alleviated somewhat in recent years with flood prevention schemes in place further along the river, notably the Barrier Bank in the north of the parish, and a Mother Drain running alongside, which allow the low-lying areas to be drained for agriculture.

== Governance and demography ==
For 2021 census purposes, Scaftworth's population is reported as totalling 44 people.

Bassetlaw district council administer the next tier of services, with Nottinghamshire County Council actioning the highest level of local public duties.

The core of the village has a conservation area designation by the district council which restricts inappropriate development.

== History ==
=== Toponymy ===
The place name Scaftworth is possibly derived from 'Skapti's enclosure'. If there was a person named as such in local history, it is unclear. It was recorded in 1086 within the Domesday Book as Scafteorde.

=== Heritage ===
The wider area contains a wealth of archaeology, with various artefacts being found, likely relating to local Roman occupation. By the time of the Domesday Book, the landowner was the Archbishop of York. By the 18th century he was still getting quit rent on these lands, from Richard Acklom who was by then the main landowner and Lord of the Manor. There were other small holdings for Bawtry chapel on lease to the Duke of Newcastle, and for the Vicar of Everton parish. It was associated as being a township of the neighbouring Everton parish. The common land was enclosed in 1772–3.

The A631 road follows the route of an old Roman road. The village was bypassed by an 0.3 mile extension in 1937. Bawtry Road Bridge was built in 1810 and widened in 1940. This is the present boundary of the parish and Nottinghamshire, with Bawtry and South Yorkshire.

Bawtry railway viaduct was previously within Scaftworth parish until the parish/county boundaries were moved further inward in 1991 to follow the changed river alignment over the railway cut. This cut was built by the Great Northern Railway in 1849 to allow continued river navigation, and the railway presently is used for the East Coast Main Line (Kings Cross to Edinburgh). Train speeds are restricted to 115 mph across the viaduct because of the boggy ground alongside the river.

=== Scaftworth Hall ===
Scaftworth is an estate village associated with Scaftworth Hall from the 18th century. In 1835, the manor comprised the whole township as under the Viscount Althorp (3rd Earl Spencer) acquired through marriage into the Acklom family who owned estates at nearby Wiseton and Everton. All were sold in 1848.

=== Roman fort and road ===
A fort was in place 300 metres (980 ft) east of Bawtry Bridge in the 4th century AD. Earthworks were still in place until at least 1770 when these were added to John Chapman's map of Nottinghamshire. White's Directory of 1835 also confirmed that there were Roman artefacts found locally, but the field had been farmed over since and the location forgotten. Rediscovery took place in the 1940s when aerial surveying of the area took place, with the elevation of the crops on the land betraying the layout of the fort, excavations confirmed the fort and scheduled monument designation was subsequently placed on the site. A Roman road layout was also determined as being north of the site, and this has also been added into the designation.

== Facilities ==
Farming is the key industry with much of the available land and buildings used to support this activity.

There is one public house, named The King William.

=== Protected locations ===
- The Hall and its barn are the only listed buildings in the parish, with a Grade II designation. It was built in the late 18th century.
- Bawtry Bridge dates from the 19th century, and was widened around 1940. It is designated as Grade II structure.
- Remains of Roman fort foundations and Roman road, off the A631 road, both designated as a scheduled monument.
