= All Saints' Church, Mattersey =

All Saints' Church Mattersey
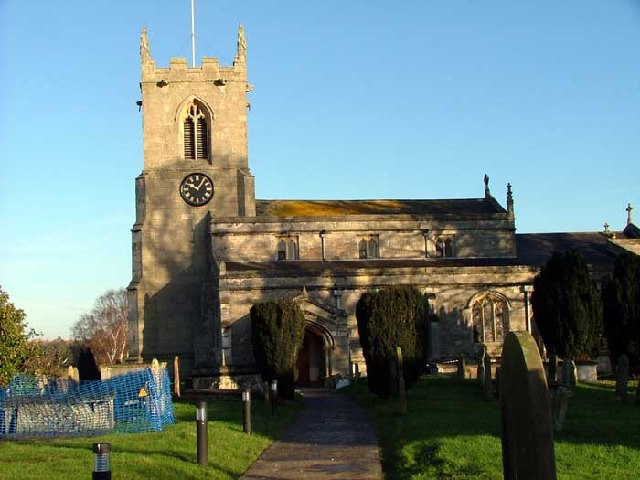
- All Saints' Church Mattersey
- All Saints' Church Mattersey
- 53°23′45.71″N 0°57′49.69″W
- OS grid reference: SK 69065 89383
- Location: Mattersey
- Country: England
- Denomination: Church of England

History
- Dedication: All Saints'

Architecture
- Heritage designation: Grade I listed

Administration
- Province: York
- Diocese: Diocese of Southwell and Nottingham
- Archdeaconry: Newark
- Deanery: Bassetlaw and Bawtry
- Parish: Mattersey

Clergy
- Vicar: Rev J Smithurst

All Saints' Church, Mattersey is a Grade I listed parish church in the Church of England in Mattersey.

== History ==
The church dates from the 13th century. There was restoration work in 1866. The church is noted for 2 un-restored, finely carved, early 14th century panels of the workshop of the Hawton Easter Sepulchre, probably brought from the Mattersey Priory. That on the east wall depicts St Martin dividing his cloak with the beggar, on the west wall St Helena finding the true cross.

The church is in a joint parish with:

- St. Peter's Church, Clayworth
- St Peter & St Paul's Church, Gringley-on-the-Hill
- Holy Trinity Church, Everton

== Organ ==
A specification of the organ can be found on the National Pipe Organ Register.

== Clock ==
The tower clock is by G. & F. Cope of Nottingham and dates from 1921.

== See also ==
- Grade I listed buildings in Nottinghamshire
- Listed buildings in Mattersey
