= Listed buildings in Mattersey =

Mattersey is a civil parish in the Bassetlaw District of Nottinghamshire, England. The parish contains 25 listed buildings that are recorded in the National Heritage List for England. Of these, one is listed at Grade I, the highest of the three grades, and the others are at Grade II, the lowest grade. The parish contains the villages of Mattersey and Mattersey Thorpe, and the surrounding countryside. Most of the listed buildings are houses and cottages, farmhouses and farm buildings. The others include a church, a village cross in the churchyard, and a telephone kiosk.

== Key ==
Grade	Criteria
I	Buildings of exceptional interest, sometimes considered to be internationally important
II	Buildings of national importance and special interest

== Buildings ==
Name and location	Photograph	Date	Notes	Grade
All Saints' Church; 53.39680°N 0.96278°W		13th century	The church has been altered and extended through the centuries, and it was restored in 1865–66. It is in stone with slate roofs, and consists of a nave with a clerestory, north and south aisles, a south porch, a chancel, a north chapel, a south vestry and a west tower. The tower has two stages, diagonal buttresses, a northwest stair turret, a three-light west window, clock faces, two-light bell openings with hood moulds, gargoyles, and an embattled parapet with corner crocketed pinnacles. The porch is gabled, the entrance has a chamfered arch flanked by columns with foliate capitals, a hood mould and a finial, and the doorway has a moulded surround.	I
Village cross 53.39641°N 0.96306°W		14th century	The village cross is in the churchyard of All Saints' Church. It is in stone, and consists of a base on which is a single piece of the shaft.	II
The Gables; 53.40162°N 0.97372°W	—	Early 17th century	A hall house converted into three cottages, it is in red brick with a rendered front, on a plinth, and has a pantile roof with stone coped gables and kneelers. There are two storeys, a hall range of two bays, and projecting gabled cross wings. The windows are a mix of casements and horizontally-sliding sashes.	II
Abbey Farm; 53.39861°N 0.94404°W		Late 17th century	The house is in stone and brick, partly rendered and painted, with pantile roofs. There are two storeys and an L-shaped plan, each wing with a single bay. In the angle is a porch with a coped parapet, and a doorway with a hood on brackets. Most of the windows are casements, some with mullions, and there is a horizontally-sliding sash window.	II
Granary Cottage; 53.40170°N 0.97353°W	—	Early 18th century	A cart shed and granary converted into a cottage, it is rendered, and has dentilled eaves, and a pantile roof with coped gables and kneelers. There are two storeys, four bays, and a lean-to. On the front are two doorways, and the windows are casements.	II
Mattersey Hall; 53.39584°N 0.96230°W		Early 18th century	A house, later a college, in red brick, with floor bands, a painted cornice, and a hipped slate roof. There are three bays, the middle bay projecting, with three storeys, the outer bays with two storeys, and a later extension on the right. In the centre is a porch with Roman Doric columns, a triglyph entablature and a dentilled pediment. The doorway has a rusticated stuccoed surround, a reeded and fluted architrave with paterae, and a traceried fanlight. The windows are a mix of sashes and casements, and at the rear are extensive later extensions.	II
Church Hall; 53.39729°N 0.96494°W		Mid 18th century	A barn, later converted for other purposes, it is in stone with a hipped pantile roof. There are two storeys and five bays, and a later two-storey lean-to. It contains a gabled porch, doorways and windows with fixed lights, all the openings under depressed segmental arches.	II
Malt Kiln House; 53.39739°N 0.96490°W		Mid 18th century	Two cottages combined into one house, it is in stone, on a plinth, and has a pyramidal pantile roof. There are three storeys and four bays. On the front are two doorways, and the windows are sashes. To the right is a lean-to, and at the rear is a single-storey two-bay extension.	II
Mattersey House; 53.39658°N 0.96500°W		Mid 18th century	A house in red brick on a plinth, with dentilled eaves and a hipped pantile roof. There are two storeys and attics, three bays, and flanking two-storey single-bay wings, and at the rear are later single-storey extensions. The central doorway has a moulded surround, a traceried fanlight and a keystone. The windows are sashes, with keystones.	II
Barn and farm buildings, Abbey Farm; 53.39868°N 0.94480°W	—	c. 1780	The farm buildings are arranged around a farmyard, and are in red brick with dentilled eaves, and hipped pantile roofs. The threshing barn has two large segmental-arched openings, vents and other openings. Attached is an L-shaped range of stables, animal houses and cart sheds.	II
Barley Mow; 53.39639°N 0.96341°W		Late 18th century	The former public house is rendered and painted, on a plinth, with a hipped pantile roof. The main block has two storeys and attics, and three bays. The central doorway has a moulded architrave, a fanlight, and a pediment on brackets, and the windows are sashes. To the right is a two-storey extension with dentilled eaves, and casement windows.	II
Bridge House; 53.39711°N 0.96313°W		Late 18th century	A red brick house with dentilled eaves and a hipped pantile roof. There are two storeys and attics, and three bays. The central doorway has a plain surround and a fanlight, and the windows are sashes.	II
Mattersey Hill Farmhouse; 53.39039°N 0.97707°W	—	Late 18th century	The farmhouse is in red brick on a plinth, with a floor band, dentilled eaves and a hipped pantile roof. There are two storeys and attics, and three bays, the middle bay projecting slightly under a dentilled pediment containing an oeil-de-boeuf. In the centre is a doorway with a moulded surround, a traceried fanlight, a keystone and a pediment. This is flanked by canted bay windows, and in the upper floors are sash windows. To the right is a later single-bay extension with a French window, and at the rear, the middle bay projects, and has a pediment with an oeil-de-boeuf.	II
The Old Vicarage; 53.39622°N 0.96177°W		Late 18th century	The vicarage, later a private house, is in red brick on a plinth, and has a pantile roof. There are two storeys and five bays. The doorway has a moulded surround, and most of the windows are sashes. Recessed on the left is a two-storey single-bay wing with dentilled eaves, and projecting from this is a single-storey wing.	II
The Chapel; 53.39446°N 0.96661°W		1792	The former chapel is stuccoed, on a stone plinth, with red brick dentilled eaves, and a pantile roof with brick coped gables and kneelers. There is a single storey and two bays. The doorway has a round-arched head and a fanlight, and the windows are sashes with round-arched heads.	II
Blaco Hill farmhouse and outbuildings 53.38449°N 0.95455°W		c. 1800	The farmhouse and outbuildings are in painted brick, the farmhouse with a hipped slate roof, and the outbuildings with pantile roofs. There are two storeys, and a central range of nine bays, flanked by three-storey tower-like projections with pyramidal roofs. The central range has a floor band and dentilled eaves, with a porch in an angle. Most of the windows are casements.	II
Bleak House Farmhouse; 53.40180°N 0.97297°W		Early 19th century	The farmhouse is in red brick with dentilled eaves, and a pantile roof with stone coped gables and kneelers. There are two storeys, a main block of three bays, and a later single-storey single-bay rear extension. The central doorway has a traceried fanlight, and the windows are sashes, all under segmental arches.	II
Chapel House; 53.39470°N 0.96632°W		Early 19th century	The house is in red brick with dentilled eaves and a pantile roof. There are two storeys and three bays, and a rear lean-to extension. In the centre is a gabled porch and a doorway with a fanlight. The windows are horizontally-sliding sashes, above the doorway is a sunken panel, and all these are under segmental arches.	II
Hall Farm; 53.39624°N 0.96341°W		Early 19th century	A brick house on a plinth, with a floor band, dogtooth eaves, and a pantile roof with kneelers and decorative ridge tiles. There are two storeys, three bays, and a lower two-storey rear wing. The central doorway has a plain surround and a pediment on brackets, and the windows are sashes.	II
Mattersey Grange; 53.39987°N 0.99161°W		Early 19th century	The house is in red brick, stuccoed on the front, with a hipped slate roof. There are two storeys and three bays, and recessed on the left is an extension and a lean-to with a pantile roof. The central doorway has a moulded surround, a traceried fanlight, and a slightly projecting hood. Flanking it are canted bay windows, and in the upper floor are sash windows.	II
Cartshed, Mattersey Hill Farm; 53.38981°N 0.97621°W	—	Early 19th century	The cart shed is in red brick with dentilled eaves and a hipped pantile roof. There is a single storey, and eight bays divided by seven round stone columns.	II
Cottages, Mattersey Hill Farm; 53.38965°N 0.97656°W	—	Early 19th century	A pair of cottages in red brick with dogtooth eaves and a pantile roof. There are two storeys and five bays, and at the rear are two two-storey cross wings. Each cottage has a central doorway under a segmental arch, and the windows are horizontally-sliding sashes, those in the ground floor with segmental arches.	II
Farm buildings, Mattersey Hill Farm; 53.39028°N 0.97652°W	—	Early 19th century	The farm buildings are in red brick, stone and wood, and have roofs of pantile and slate. They include a barn with two storeys and six bays, attached to its left is a single-storey stable with five bays, and further to the left is a barn range. There are further barn ranges, and at the rear is a hexagonal gin gang.	II
Outbuilding, The Old Vicarage; 53.39598°N 0.96163°W	—	Early 19th century	The outbuilding is in red brick, with a floor band and a hipped pantile roof. There are two storeys and three bays, flanked by single-storey single-bay wings. In the middle bay is a doorway in both floors, some windows have fixed lights, there is a horizontally-sliding window, and in the wings are large doors with fanlights. All the openings have segmental heads.	II
Telephone kiosk 53.39632°N 0.96294°W		1935	The K6 type telephone kiosk in High Street was designed by Giles Gilbert Scott. Constructed in cast iron with a square plan and a dome, it has three unperforated crowns in the top panels.	II
