= Gringley on the Hill =

Civil parish in Nottinghamshire, England

Coordinates: 53.408°N 0.895°W

- Village and Civil parish
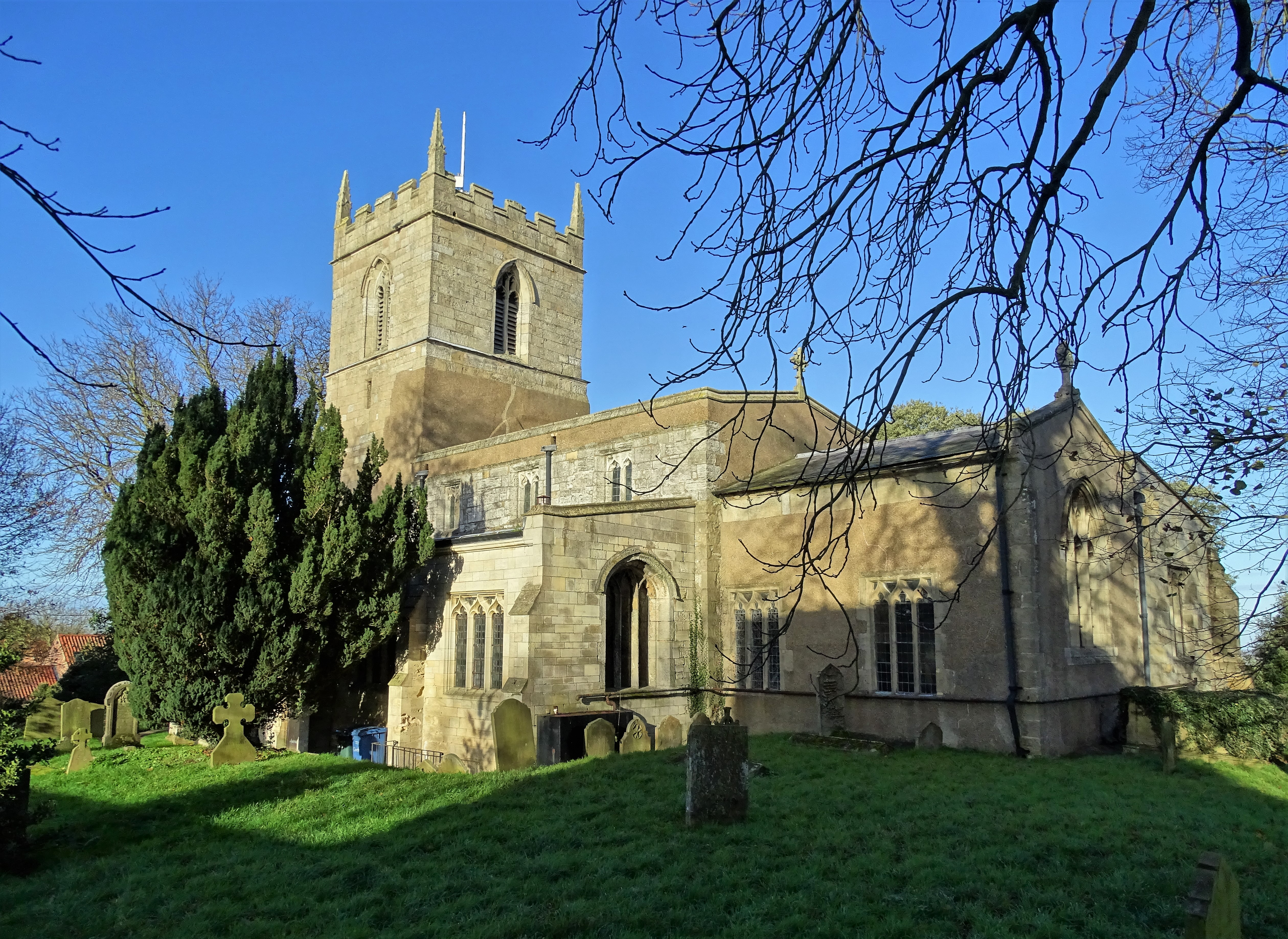
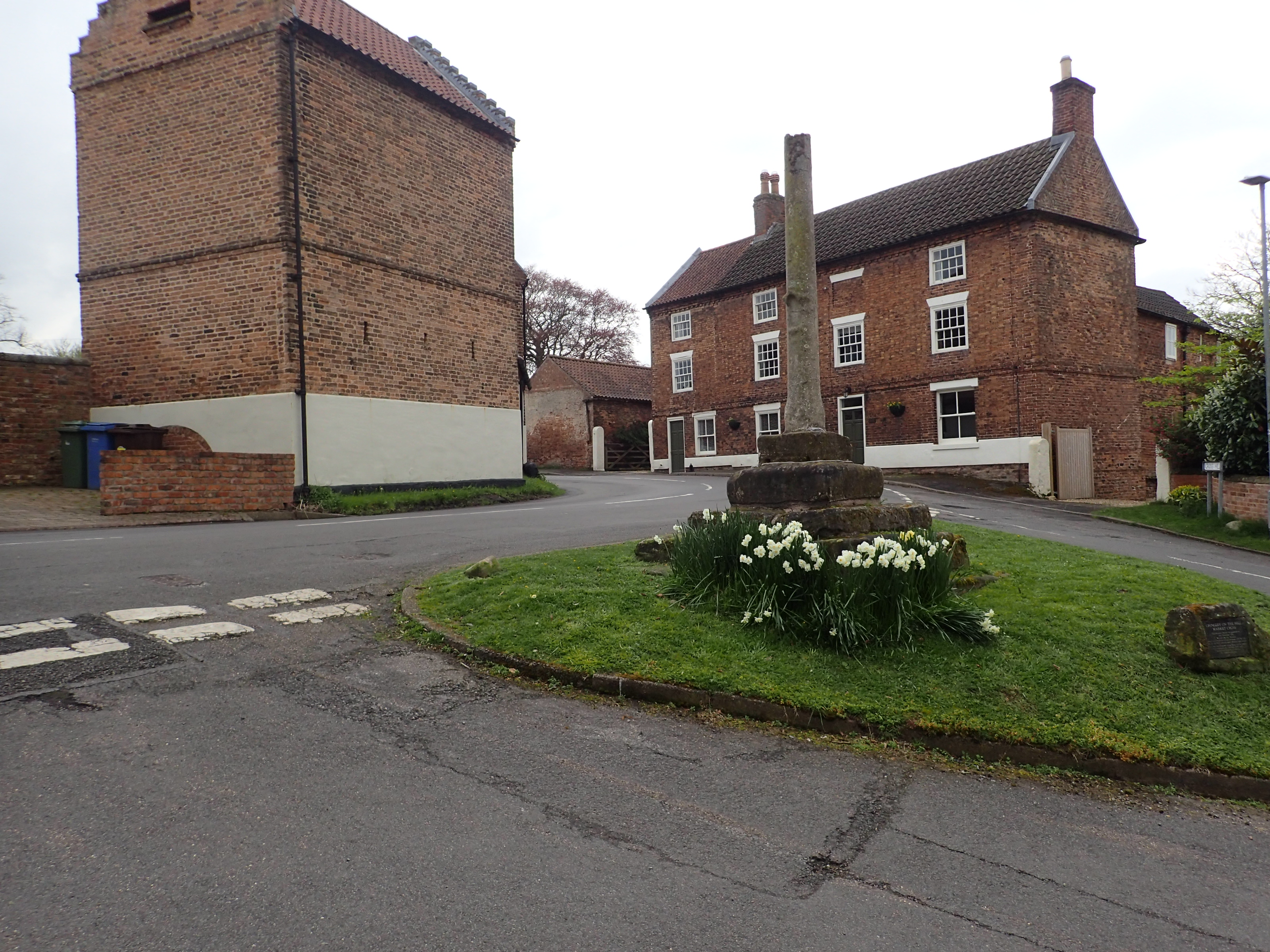
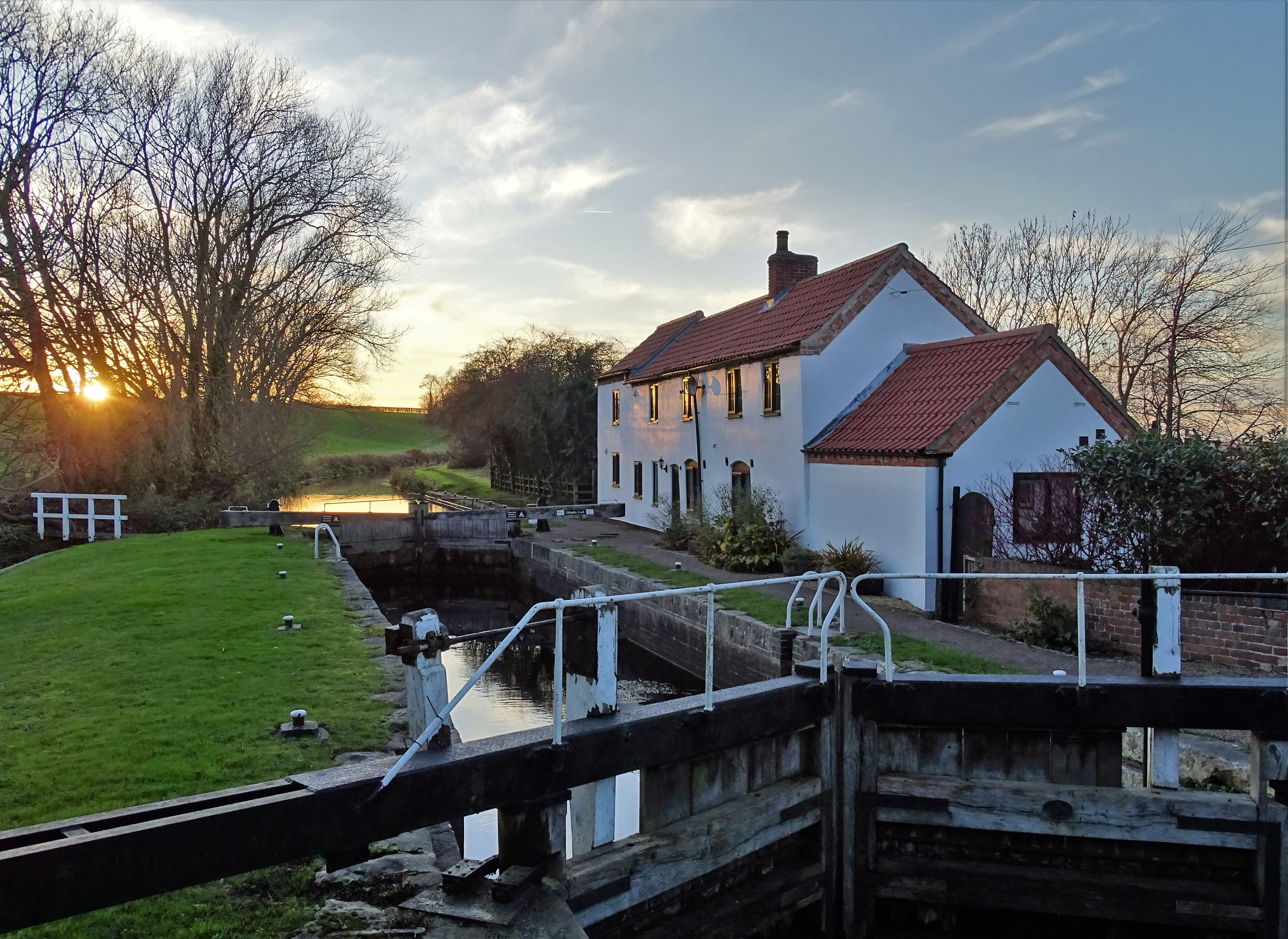
- St Peter and St Paul's Church Market Cross Gringley Lock

- Location within Nottinghamshire
- Interactive map of Gringley on the Hill
- Area: 6.79 sq mi (17.6 km^{2})
- Population: 854 (2021)
  - Density: 126/sq mi (49/km^{2})
- OS grid reference: SK 735906
  - London: 135 mi (217 km) SE
- District: Bassetlaw
- Shire county: Nottinghamshire
- Region: East Midlands
- Country: England
- Sovereign state: United Kingdom
- Post town: DONCASTER
- Postcode district: DN10
- Dialling code: 01777
- Police: Nottinghamshire
- Fire: Nottinghamshire
- Ambulance: East Midlands
- UK Parliament: Bassetlaw
- Website: http://www.gringleyvillage.org.uk

Gringley on the Hill, Nottinghamshire, is an English village and parish. The population of the civil parish was 699 at the 2011 census, rising to 854 in 2021. It lies on the highest point of the road from Bawtry to Gainsborough, six miles east-south-east of the former and the same distance west by north of the latter.

== Location ==
From its situation on the loftiest of the promontories which overlook the wide extent of Misson Carr and Misterton Carr, it commands such extensive prospects that Lincoln Cathedral can be seen from it on a clear day across the vale of the Trent, whilst in the nearer distance the Chesterfield Canal appears emerging from the tunnel at Drakeholes, winding under the long ridge of hills which extends eastward to the River Trent.

=== Antiquities ===
The English Heritage Archive includes three sites located in the village, in addition to the church. These are the site of a prehistoric hillfort at Beacon Hill, the remains of a medieval market cross, and a four-storey tower windmill dating from 1830.

=== Church ===
St Peter & St Paul's Church is of Norman construction, with a later Perpendicular tower. Notable features include an Early English pillar piscina, a free-standing basin used for washing communion vessels.

=== Windmill ===
A brick tower windmill was built at Gringley around 1830 by Jabez Wilkinson, replacing a post mill that previously occupied the same site. The four-storey tower was derelict by 1977.

== 2022 temperature record ==
On 19 July 2022, a temperature of 40.1 °C (104.2 °F) was recorded at Gringley on the Hill, which is the highest recorded temperature in Nottinghamshire and one of the highest recorded in the United Kingdom and also making Gringley on the Hill the northernmost place in the UK to exceed 40 °C (104 °F).

It surpassed the Nottinghamshire record set only the day before (18 July) of 36.7 °C (98.1 °F), which was recorded at Sutton Bonington. The previous Nottinghamshire record was 36.1 °C (97.0 °F), recorded at the Nottingham Weather Centre.

== See also ==
- Listed buildings in Gringley on the Hill
