= Mattersey Thorpe =

Village in Nottinghamshire, England

Coordinates: 53.400°N 0.974°W

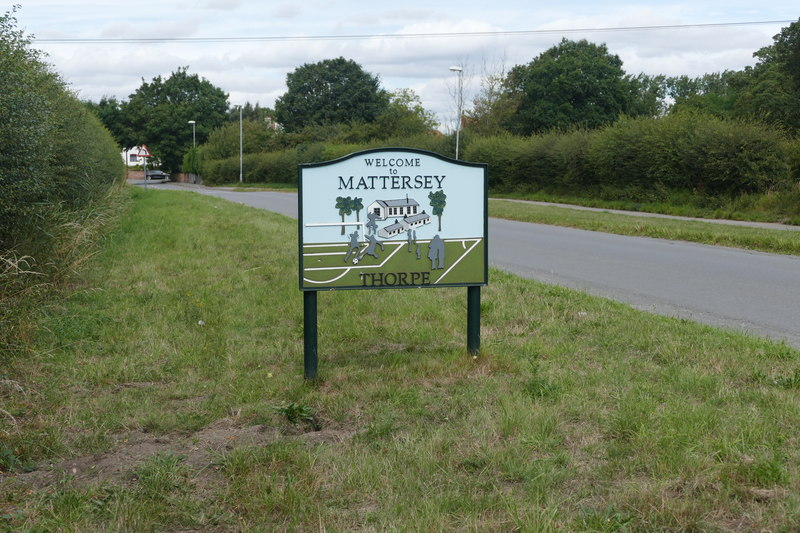
- Mattersey Thorpe boundary sign

- Location within Nottinghamshire
- Interactive map of Mattersey Thorpe
- OS grid reference: SK 68276 89838
  - London: 135 mi (217 km) SE
- Civil parish: Mattersey
- District: Bassetlaw
- Shire county: Nottinghamshire
- Region: East Midlands
- Country: England
- Sovereign state: United Kingdom
- Post town: DONCASTER
- Postcode district: DN10
- Dialling code: 01777
- Police: Nottinghamshire
- Fire: Nottinghamshire
- Ambulance: East Midlands
- UK Parliament: Bassetlaw
- Website: matterseypc.co.uk

Mattersey Thorpe is a small village in the Bassetlaw district of northern Nottinghamshire, England. It is 134 miles (216 km) north of London, 32 miles (51 km) north of the county town and city of Nottingham, and 5 1/2 miles (8.9 km) north of the town of Retford. It is in the civil parish of Mattersey.

== Geography ==
Mattersey Thorpe is surrounded by the following local areas:

- Everton and Harwell to the north
- Mattersey to the south east
- Ranskill and Scrooby to the west.

This area lies in the north within Bassetlaw district and the wider county. Within the parish, the area is also to the north, and is 1/2 mile (0.80 km) from Mattersey village.

The historic core of the Mattersey Thorpe is located where Breck Lane meets Thorpe Lane. This end of the area is predominantly a farming community, interspersed by farms, the occasional residential dwelling and greenfield land. the land elevation here is approximately 10 metres (33 ft)

A modern estate sits directly to the west centred around the Bader Rise and Keyes Rise roads, and within this the land elevation is approximately 10–18 metres (33–59 ft), the area being along the slopes of a small hill.

The area stands on the west bank of the River Idle.

== Governance ==
The area, along with Mattersey village are both within Mattersey parish.

Mattersey Parish Council manage the lowest levels of public duties in the settlements.

The middle tier of local government is performed by Bassetlaw District Council.

Nottinghamshire County Council provides the highest level strategic services locally.

== History ==
=== Toponymy ===
Mattersey was Madressei or Madreisseig in the Domesday Book of 1086, meaning 'well-watered land', implying a flood plain area due to its proximity to a river.

Mattersey Thorpe was not recorded in Domesday, but was first reported in county records as Thorpe in 1298. The thorpe is used here in Norse form as a 'hamlet adjoining a village or chief settlement.'

It was further recorded as Thorp juxta Madersey in 1305, with a recognisably modern form appearing in 1545 Nottinghamshire post mortem records as Matterseythorp.

=== Heritage ===
Before the Norman Conquest in 1066 AD, Mattersey was the manor of Earl Tostig Godwinson. After the historic Battle of Hastings in which he died, Mattersey was given to a Norman family who took the name of De Mattersey or Maresay. Mattersey Thorpe comprised 4 farms and their associated dwellings (one dating to 1648) until 1940. During World War II, 157 pre-fabricated bungalows were built as an emergency housing settlement by the government for workers at the munitions factory that had been established in nearby Ranskill. Many of the roads then built were named after notable wartime figures (Keyes Rise, Winston Green, Bader Rise, Wavell Crescent, Cunningham Close, Newall Close, Wilson Close). There was also a shop, school and club building. After the war, the district council rebuilt part of the area in the 1970s with urban-styled council housing. In the 1990s a development of market housing of 2 and 3 bed bungalows was completed on the remaining land.

== Culture and community ==
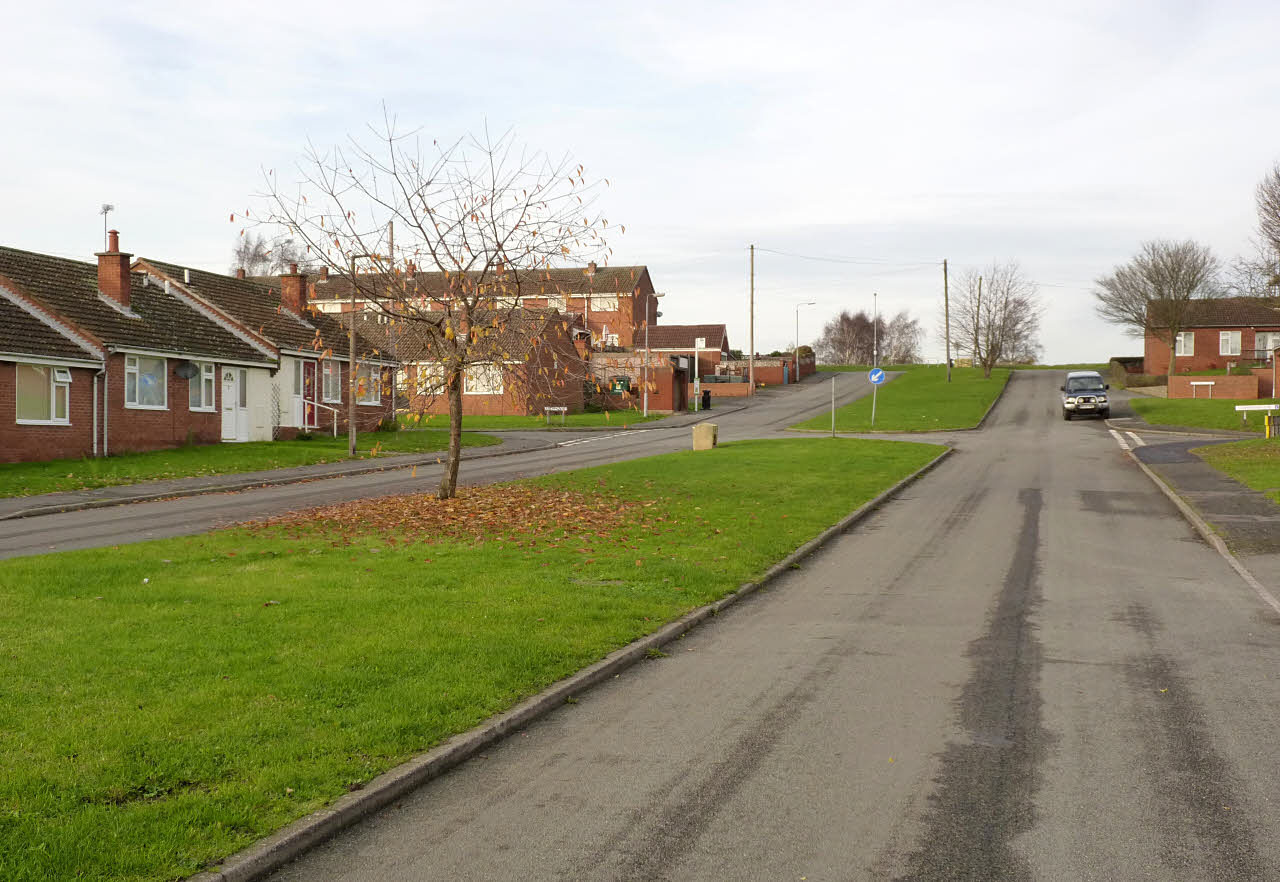
Keyes Rise, a key road in the new estate

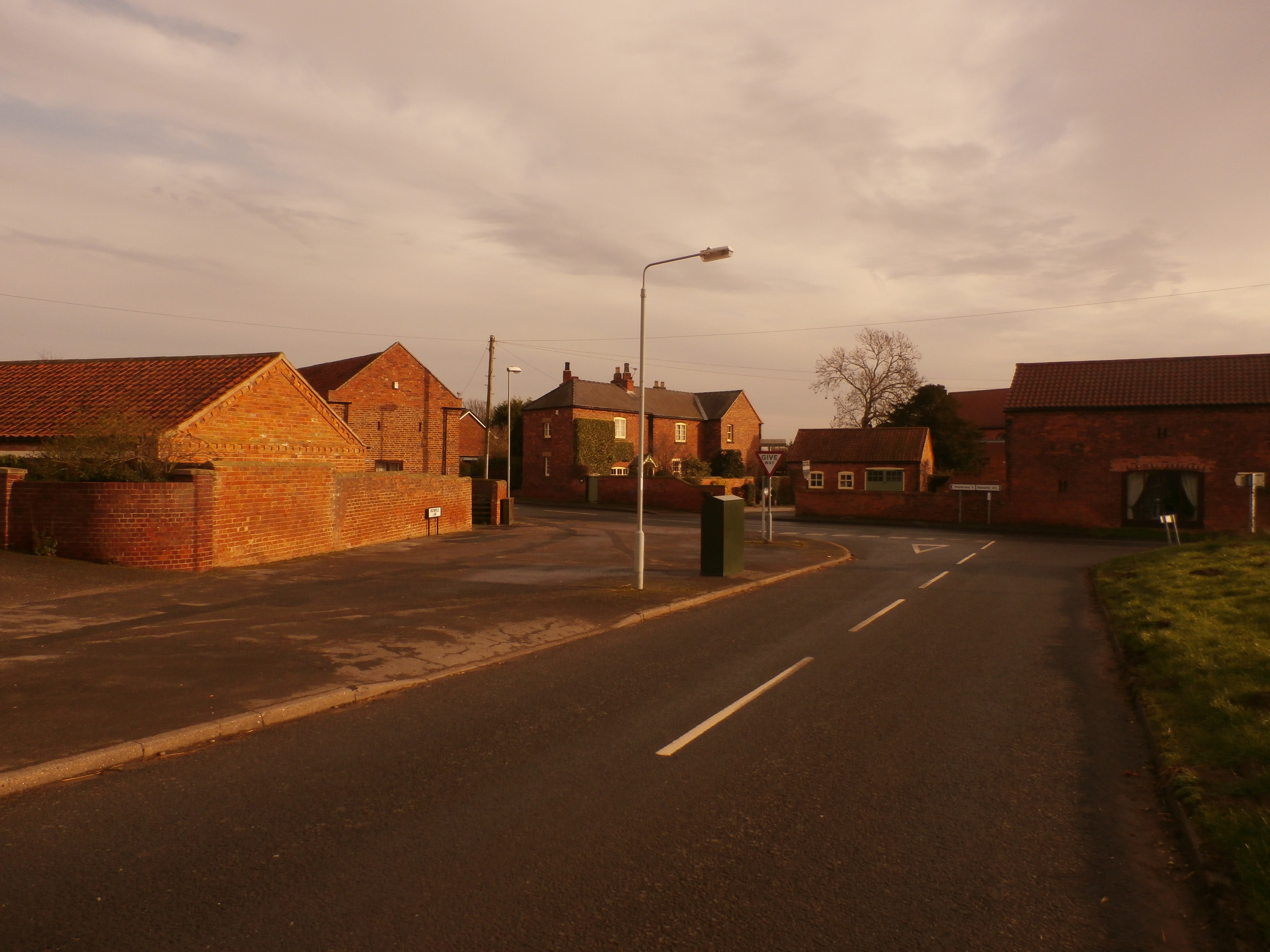
Historic part of Mattersey Thorpe by Broomfield Lane and Thorpe Lane

Facilities include:

- The Green - includes a play area for young children
- The Playing Fields
- Community centre

== Landmarks ==
There are three listed buildings, all at Grade II and in the historic portion of the village:

- The Gables, which was the old hall dating from the 1600s, before being converted into three dwellings
- Bleake House Farmhouse
- Granary Cottage
