= Holy Trinity Church, Everton =

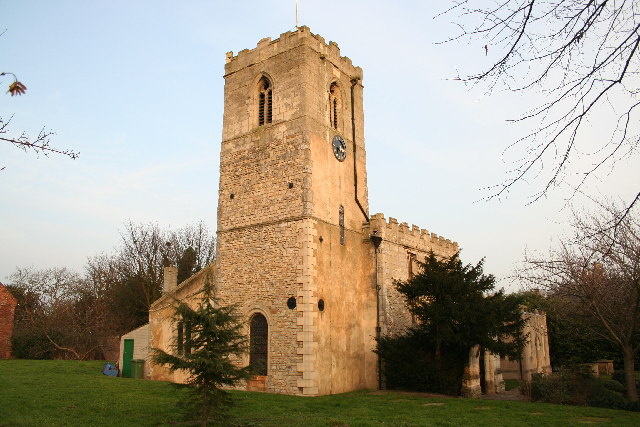
- Holy Trinity Church, Everton
- Holy Trinity Church, Everton
- 53°24′53.61″N 0°57′42.62″W
- OS grid reference: SK 69136 91334
- Location: Everton, Nottinghamshire
- Country: England
- Denomination: Church of England

History
- Dedication: Holy Trinity

Architecture
- Heritage designation: Grade II* listed

Administration
- Province: York
- Diocese: Diocese of Southwell and Nottingham
- Archdeaconry: Newark
- Deanery: Bassetlaw and Bawtry
- Parish: Everton

Clergy
- Vicar: Rev J Smithurst

Holy Trinity Church, Everton is a Grade II* listed parish church in the Church of England in Everton, Nottinghamshire.

== History ==
The church dates from the 11th century with additions in every century to the 16th. There was restoration work in 1841. By 1843 the size of Everton's population meant that yet again Holy Trinity needed extending. This was achieved by increasing the chancel eastward. In addition an annex on the southern side of the chancel was added. By 1869 Holy Trinity was in need of general restoration. It was during this time that all the gargoyles were removed and the floor was lowered.

The church is in a joint parish with:

- St. Peter's Church, Clayworth
- St Peter & St Paul's Church, Gringley-on-the-Hill
- All Saints' Church, Mattersey

== See also ==
- Grade II* listed buildings in Nottinghamshire
- Listed buildings in Everton, Nottinghamshire
