= Newington, Nottinghamshire =

Hamlet in Nottinghamshire, England

Coordinates: 53.439°N 0.996°W

Newington
- Hamlet
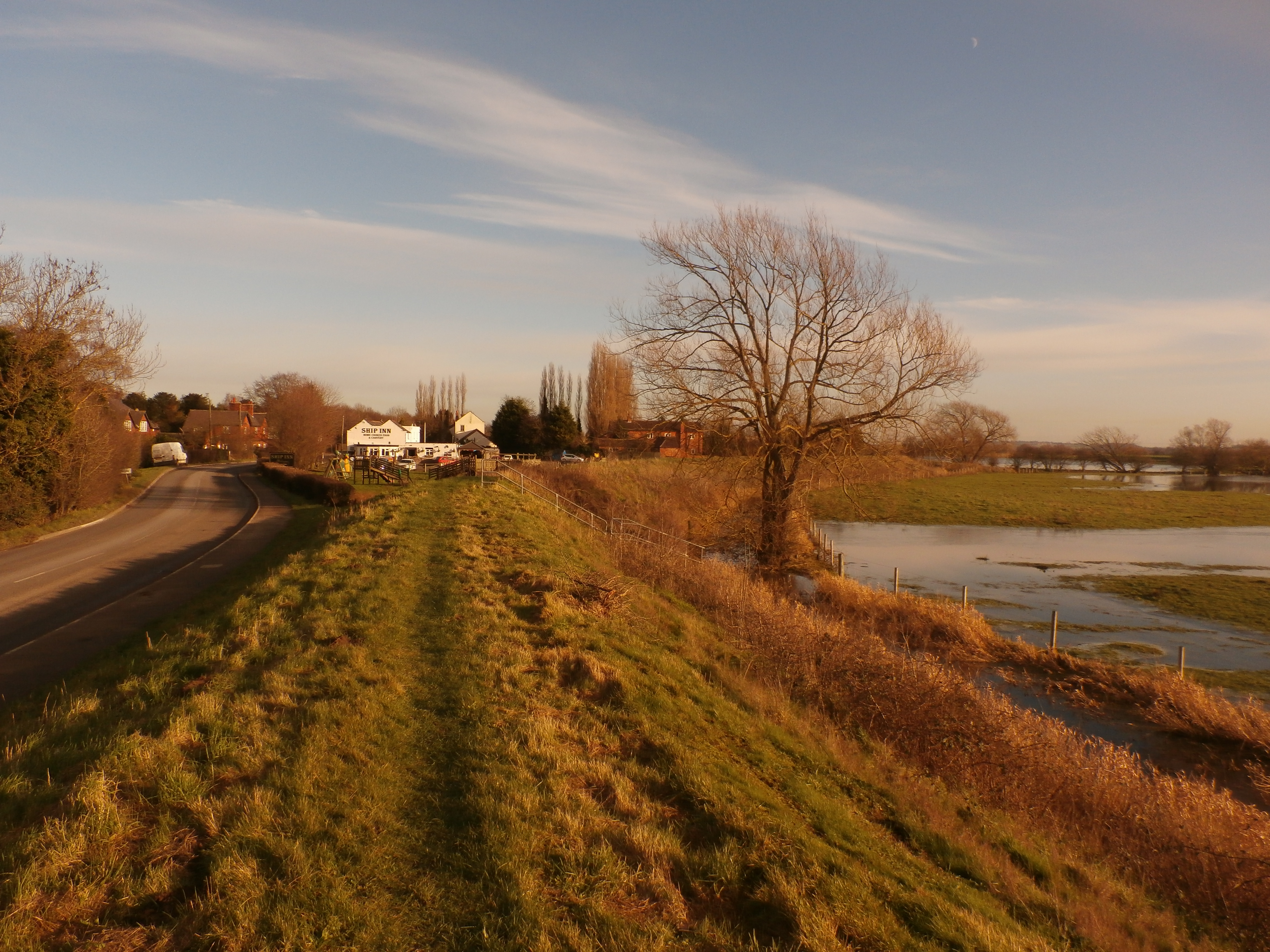
- The Ship Inn

- Location within Nottinghamshire
- OS grid reference: SK 66741 94063
- Civil parish: Misson
- District: Bassetlaw
- Shire county: Nottinghamshire
- Region: East Midlands
- Country: England
- Sovereign state: United Kingdom
- Post town: DONCASTER
- Postcode district: DN10
- Police: Nottinghamshire
- Fire: Nottinghamshire
- Ambulance: East Midlands
- UK Parliament: Bassetlaw

Map

Newington is a hamlet in the Bassetlaw district of northern Nottinghamshire, England. It is 138 miles (222 km) north west of London, 34 miles (55 km) north of the county town and city of Nottingham, and 1 mile (1.6 km) north east of the nearest town Bawtry. It is in the civil parish of Misson.

== Toponymy ==
Newington was not recorded in the Domesday Book of 1086. The Old English form is Niuwan tune, meaning the "new homestead."

== Geography ==
Newington is surrounded by the following local areas:

- Norwith Hill and Finningley to the north
- Scaftworth to the south
- Misson to the east
- Austerfield and Bawtry to the west.

This area lies in the far north within Bassetlaw district and Nottinghamshire county. Within the parish, the area is to the south west, and is 1 1/2 miles (2.4 km) from Misson village. The historic core of the hamlet is located along Newington Road, directly adjacent to the parish and county boundaries. Surrounding the settlement is predominantly a farming area, interspersed by farms, occasional residential dwellings and greenfield land. Norwith Hill is 1 mile (1.6 km) to the north of Newington and was a derelict farm rebuilt in the early to middle 2000s as a cluster of private homes.

The area stands on the north bank of the River Idle, alongside the Idle Washlands which is particularly liable to flooding. The county boundary here follows the path of a land drainage course previously known as the Rugged Carr Drain, but now marked as the New Drain, into the Idle. The area is particularly low-lying being within the wider Idle Lowlands region, at a land elevation of 5–10 metres (16–33 ft), rising slightly along the road towards Misson by Newington Farm, located along a sand and gravel bar known as Hagg Hill.

== Governance ==
The hamlet and its surrounding area, as well as the village of Misson village are located within the civil parish of Misson. Misson Parish Council manage the lowest levels of public duties in the settlements. The middle tier of local government is performed by Bassetlaw District Council, while Nottinghamshire County Council provides the highest level strategic services locally.

== History ==
A number of early prehistoric lithic finds and some Roman pottery have been discovered to the west of Newington Farm. These were recorded during late 19th and early 20th century, when gravel was extracted on Hagg Hill, from where a Bronze Age palstave, a type of bronze axe, was also found. A watching brief conducted during the construction of the reservoir for Tunnel Tech recovered 36 struck flints, generally well-preserved and dating to the Mesolithic (around 8000BC to 4500BC), Neolithic (around 4500BC to 2500BC) and early Bronze Age (2500BC to 700BC). The material was thought to be locally derived. Other locally recovered artefacts are held Bassetlaw Museum, mostly found in the area between Misson and Newington alongside the road, including several brooches and coins. Hagg Hill is where it is most likely the first settlement was made in the wider parish, possibly to have been a Roman encampment which was later developed by the Danes who came up the Trent valley to Gainsborough and then up the River Idle and reused the old Roman encampment at the Hagg to establish their own settlement.

After the Norman Conquest, Roger De Busli was given most of this area. For many years the local area lay undeveloped owing to the waterlogged state of the land, most of the lowland being little more than marshland. In 1626 however, King Charles I granted permission to the Netherlands native Cornelius Vermyden to drain the fenlands known as Hatfield Chase, which was part of the king's royal hunting land. The land drained included the locality around Newington as part of Vemyden's attempt to halt the flooding of thousands of acres of land. In 1760-2 enclosure saw land at Hagg Hill being granted to Misson village for obtaining gravel to repair local roads, being a precursor to present day mining activities. Some of this land was also rented out for grazing, to raise money to pay for repairs to infrastructure such as a school at Misson, bridges and drains. At Norwith Hill to the north of the village, a farm was established by Jonathan Acklom as a part of his wider land holdings in the latter 18th century, with some quarrying taking place in the vicinity by the late 1990s. In the late 18th century, an extensive brewing and malting establishment had been established at Newington, which was noted for its porter. However, by the turn of the 20th century it had fallen into disuse.

== Culture and community ==
There is one public house, The Ship Inn. The name may reflect the fact that the adjacent River Idle was navigable to Bawtry in the Middle Ages.

== Economy ==
Hanson Aggregates extract aggregate in the area. Misson Quarry is to the north of Bawtry Road, Newington South quarry takes up a large site to the east of the village which has been worked since the 1990s.

Tunnel Tech North at Newington Farm also to the east is an organic produce processing facility.

== Landmarks ==
The Idle Washlands lie to the south of the area along the River Idle floodplain. Approximately 88.5 hectares (219 acres), the site of special scientific interest (SSSI) conservation area comprises examples of wet washland and grassland plants, and attracts wintering and passage waterfowl. The Newington Washlands of 50.99 hectares (126.0 acres) is directly to the south east of the village, and is one of five subcomponent washland areas.

== Bibliography ==
- Tagg, Michael (September 2017). "Misson Conservation Area Appraisal & Management Plan" (PDF). Bassetlaw District Council. Archived (PDF) from the original on 8 May 2023.
