= Listed buildings in Misson, Nottinghamshire =

Misson is a civil parish in the Bassetlaw District of Nottinghamshire, England. The parish contains 16 listed buildings that are recorded in the National Heritage List for England. Of these, one is listed at Grade I, the highest of the three grades, and the others are at Grade II, the lowest grade. The parish contains the village of Misson and the surrounding countryside. The listed buildings consist of houses, cottages and associated structures, farmhouses and a church.

== Key ==
Grade	Criteria
I	Buildings of exceptional interest, sometimes considered to be internationally important
II	Buildings of national importance and special interest

== Buildings ==
Name and location	Photograph	Date	Notes	Grade
Church of St John the Baptist and wall 53.44659°N 0.96100°W		14th century	The church has been altered and extended through the centuries, including a restoration and alterations in 1893 by C. Hodgson Fowler following damage by lightning. The church is built in stone and brick, it is partly rendered, and has roofs of slate and felt. It consists of a nave with a clerestory, north and south aisles, a south porch and a west tower. The tower has two stages, diagonal buttresses, a moulded plinth, a west doorway with a chamfered surround and a hood mould, above which is a triple lancet window and a clock face, two string courses, gargoyles, and an embattled parapet with corner crocketed pinnacles. There are also embattled parapets on the body of the church. The boundary wall has stone coping, and contains moulded square gate piers, and to the east is a pair of timber posts with an iron wicket gate.	I
Cookson's Cottage; 53.44623°N 0.96436°W		17th century	The cottage has a timber framed core, with external walls in stone and brick, mainly rendered, dentilled eaves at the rear, and a pantile roof with coped gables. There is a single storey and attics, three bays, and the gable end faces the street. On the front are two doorways, and the windows are horizontally-sliding sashes.	II
White Cottage, Church Street; 53.44656°N 0.96033°W		17th century	A cottage and an outbuilding converted into a house, in pebbledashed colourwashed brick with pantile roofs. The cottage has a single storey and attics, and three bays. The windows are casements, and there is a flat-roofed dormer. The former outbuilding is lower, and contains various openings including casement windows and dormers.	II
White Gates and White Gates Cottage; 53.44702°N 0.96189°W	—	17th century	A house and a cottage, with the gable end facing the street. The cottage on the right is rendered, on a plinth, and has a pantile roof with a coped gable. There are two storeys, three bays, and a lean-to on the right. The house is in rendered brick, with dentilled eaves and a pantile roof. There are two storeys and two bays, and the windows in both parts are casements.	II
Wardens Cottage; 53.44576°N 0.96435°W		1692	The cottage is in brick with stone dressings, quoins, a moulded lintel band, and a pantile roof with a stone coped gable and kneelers. There are two storeys and two bays. The doorway has a chamfered surround and a keystone, to its left is a three-light mullioned window, and to the right is a small blocked opening. Above the doorway is a datestone with initials and a fleur-de-lys motif, to the left is a two-light horizontally-sliding sash window and to the right is a casement window.	II
White Cottage, Middle Street; 53.44710°N 0.96222°W	—	c. 1700	The cottage is rendered and colourwashed with timber framing, on a rendered plinth, with a hipped pantile roof. There is a single storey with attics, three bays, a lean-to garage on the left, and a brick extension on the right. On the front are a doorway, a stable door, casement windows, and three flat-roofed dormers.	II
Woodbine Lodge, railing and gatepiers 53.44616°N 0.96188°W	—	18th century	A brick house, pebbledashed at the front and colourwashed, on a stone plinth, with stone dressings, and a hipped slate roof. There are two storeys, an L-shaped plan, and a front of two bays. At the rear is a lean-to porch, the windows on the front are sashes, and at the rear they are casements. In front of the house is an ornamental cast iron railing with matching gateposts and a gate to the right. To the left is a pair of octagonal stone gate piers with octagonal bases and pointed octagonal caps, containing a metal gate.	II
Northfield House, railings and wall 53.44896°N 0.96234°W	—	Late 18th century	The house is in brick, partly rendered, and it has a pantile roof with stone coped gables and kneelers. There are two storeys, three bays, and a lean-to rear extension. In the centre is a doorway with a plain surround and a fanlight, the windows are sashes, and all the openings have rubbed brick heads. Along the front of the house are cast iron spearhead railings and two gates, and to the north and the south are brick boundary walls with stone coping.	II
Willow House; 53.44585°N 0.96144°W	—	c. 1800	The house is in stuccoed brick on a stone plinth, with stone dressings, small moulded eaves dentils, and a hipped slate roof. There are two storeys and an L-shaped plan, with a front range of three bays. The central doorway has panelled pilasters, a fanlight, a reeded frieze with guttae, and a moulded cornice. The windows are sashes, and on the right return is a full-height segmental bow window.	II
Church House; 53.44629°N 0.96110°W		Early 19th century	The house is in red brick, partly rendered and colourwashed, with dentilled eaves and a hipped pantile roof. There are two storeys, an L-shaped plan, and a front of three bays. The central doorway has pilasters, a fanlight and a hood, and above it is a blank panel. The windows on the front are sashes, those in the ground floor under segmental arches, and in the left return are two slightly bowed small-paned shop windows with moulded surrounds.	II
Gibdyke Farmhouse and wall 53.44762°N 0.95926°W		Early 19th century	The farmhouse is in colourwashed rendered brick with a hipped slate roof. There are two storeys, three bays and a square plan. In the centre is a doorway flanked by Greek Doric columns with square abaci, an architrave, a fanlight and moulded hood, and the windows on the front are sashes. To the left is a lean-to porch with casement windows, and at the rear is a later single-bay extension with a pantile roof containing a round-headed sash window with Gothic tracery. Outside the house are two flanking brick walls with stone coping, and at the front is a dwarf stone-coped wall with iron railings, containing four stone moulded gate piers with moulded square caps.	II
Greenbank; 53.44685°N 0.96023°W		Early 19th century	A brick house with dentilled eaves and a hipped pantile roof. There are two storeys, three bays, and a lean-to range at the rear. The central doorway has a fanlight, and the windows on the front are sashes with rubbed brick heads. On the right return is a doorway and a horizontally-sliding sash window with a segmental head.	II
Newlands Farm House; 53.47859°N 0.93980°W	—	Early 19th century	The farmhouse is in brick on a rendered plinth, with stone dressings and a hipped pantile roof. There are two storeys, three bays, and a later extension to the east. The central doorway has pilasters and a fanlight, and the windows are sashes. At the rear is a doorway with a hood.	II
Swan House; 53.44630°N 0.96025°W	—	Early 19th century	A brick house with stone sills, timber dentilled eaves and a hipped slate roof. There are two storeys, an L-shaped plan, a front of three bays, and a rear wing. The central doorway has a plain surround and a fanlight, the windows are sashes, and all the openings on the front have rubbed brick heads. At the rear is an extension with a pantile roof, and a former cottage with two storeys and a single bay.	II
West Hill, wall and railing 53.44643°N 0.96446°W	—	Early 19th century	The farmhouse is in brick on a rendered plinth, with dentilled eaves and a hipped pantile roof. There are two storeys and an L-shaped plan, with a front range of three bays, and a rendered rear wing. In the centre is a gabled porch with decorative bargeboards, and a round-headed doorway with a fanlight. The windows are sashes with rubbed brick heads. Along the front of the house is a stone coped dwarf brick wall with cast iron spearhead railing and a gate.	II
The Old Vicarage; 53.45119°N 0.95727°W	—	c. 1830	The vicarage, later a private house, is in rendered brick with a hipped Welsh slate roof. There are two storeys, an L-shaped plan, and a front of five bays. The central doorway has a reeded and panelled surround, a reeded architrave with paterae, a double fanlight, and a small hood. The windows are casements with stone sills.	II
