= Misson, Nottinghamshire =

Village and civil parish in Nottinghamshire, England

Coordinates: 53.45°N 0.96°W

Misson
- Village and Civil parish
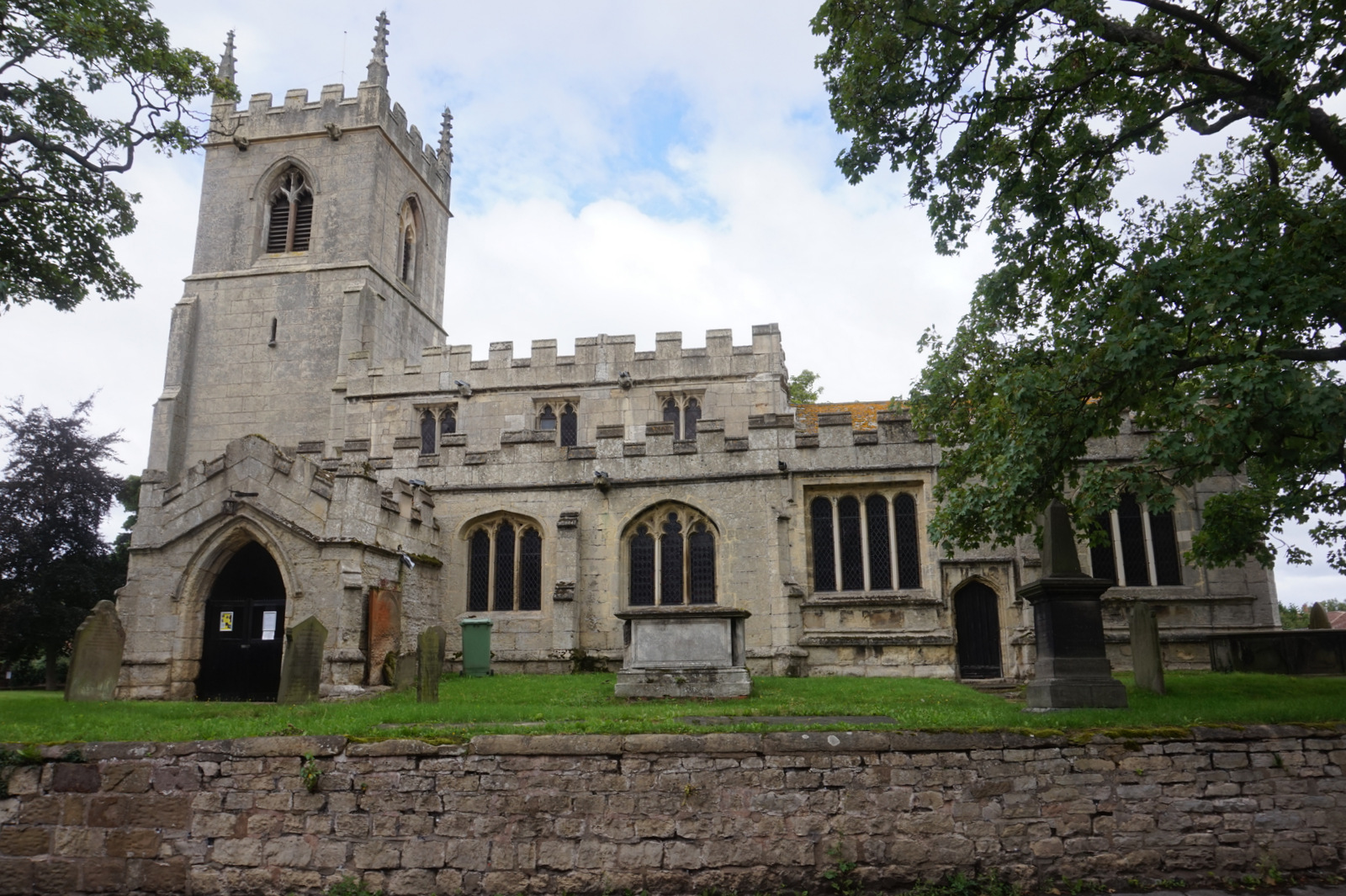
- St John the Baptist Church

- Location within Nottinghamshire
- Interactive map of Misson
- Area: 9.63 sq mi (24.9 km^{2})
- Population: 713 (2021)
  - Density: 74/sq mi (29/km^{2})
- OS grid reference: SK 690949
  - London: 175 mi (282 km) SSE
- District: Bassetlaw
- Shire county: Nottinghamshire
- Region: East Midlands
- Country: England
- Sovereign state: United Kingdom
- Places: Misson, Misson Springs, Newington
- Post town: DONCASTER
- Postcode district: DN10
- Dialling code: 01302
- Police: Nottinghamshire
- Fire: Nottinghamshire
- Ambulance: East Midlands
- UK Parliament: Bassetlaw
- Website: www.missonparishcouncil.gov.uk

Misson is a village and civil parish in Nottinghamshire, England. It is located 16 miles north of Retford and 18 north-west of Worksop, and not directly accessible from the rest of Nottinghamshire, as it is on the north bank of the River Idle. Misson Springs, which lie north of the village itself, is the northernmost place within the county. The parish also includes the hamlet of Newington, at its western edge. According to the 2001 census it had a population of 698, increasing to 711 at the 2011 census, and marginally more to 713 residents at the 2021 census.

The parish church of St John the Baptist was rebuilt after extensive damage by lightning in 1894. RAF Misson was located about a mile to the north-east of the village.

Permission was granted in 2016 to test for shale gas in Misson.

== Toponymy ==
The place-name Misson is possibly a derivative of an Old English word, mos, 'moss, marsh, bog', hence 'mossy or marshy place'. Alternatively the name may contain Old Norse mysni, 'a water-plant’, perhaps the water-arum.

Misson appears in the Domesday Book of 1086 as Misna and Misne.

== History ==
When the Domesday survey was completed in 1086, Misson was mentioned, but there was no church building at that time. The first church building was constructed around 1150, and was made of limestone, probably shipped in on the River Idle, since this stone does not occur locally. The building belonged to Welbeck Abbey, but a Gilbertine Priory was established at Mattersey, around 1185, and the Canons argued that the church should belong to them. It is not clear what the grounds for this argument were, but the dispute was eventually referred to Pope Celestine III, who passed the decision back to local authorities. A meeting at Blyth in 1192 decided in favour of Mattersey Priory owning it. One hundred years later, John Clarell was the vicar, who as well as also being vicar of Babworth, East Bridgford, Lowdham and Harworth, found time to be chaplain to the Pope and to King Edward I.

The church was visited by the Archbishop of York, Thomas Wolsey, in 1530, after he fell out of favour with the king and was stripped of his other offices. Henry VIII's split with Rome and the Dissolution of the Monasteries led to Mattersey Priory being dissolved in 1538, and although most of its property was sold off, the church came under the patronage of the king from then onwards, and was valued at a little over £6. The village was devastated by fire on 8 August 1652, when 48 buildings were destroyed by the blaze, but most of the villagers were attending church, which was not affected by the fire.

Misson was the location for one of the first schools in Nottinghamshire, when in 1693 Thomas Mowbray and John Pinder sponsored the construction of a building in the churchyard. It was granted an income of £5 per year, raised from some land in the parish, and was to teach six children at a time to read. In 1745, the vicar John Foss reported to the Archbishop of York that there were 70 families in the village, 50 people who took communion, and over 20 children in the school. The population had increased to 99 families by 1764. More detailed figures are available for 1832, when 841 people lived in the village, although this had reduced to 719 people by 1912. In 1832 there were eight public houses in the village: The Green Dragon, Ferry Boat Inn, The White Horse, The Red Lion, The Globe, The Golden Ball, The Oddfellows Arms and Bull Hill.

Misson Inclosure Act 1759
- Act of Parliament
- Parliament of Great Britain
- Long title: An Act for dividing and allotting the Common and Waste Grounds, Open Arable Fields, Meadows, and Pastures, in the Township and Parish of Misson, in the Counties of Nottingham and Lincoln, or One of them.
- Citation: 33 Geo. 2. c. 50 Pr.
- Territorial extent: Great Britain

Dates
- Royal assent: 22 May 1760
- Commencement: 13 November 1759 (Note: Start of session.)

Status: Current legislation

A directory of 1853 stated that the village contained 5,783 acres (2,340 ha) of good sandy soil, and that most of this had previously been common land, but had been enclosed in 1769. However, the inclosure award granted under the Misson Inclosure Act 1759 (33 Geo. 2. c. 50 Pr.) was awarded on 11 June 1762, and a copy of it is held in the archive at the University of Nottingham . A map produced in 1761 shows that Misson was surrounded by three fields, East Field to the east, Butt Field to the west and Mill Field to the north-west. It shows how these were sub-divided as a result of the enclosures. To the north of them, the area remained common land, and was used for the grazing of animals, the production of hay, and probably also reeds for thatching. Part of Misson was in Nottinghamshire, and part was in Lincolnshire, but the boundary between the two counties was not well defined in 1853. There was a ferry across the River Idle, which ran from the bottom of Water Lane on the north bank to a point a little further downstream on the south bank. The ferry allowed villagers to reach Everton, and is thought to have operated from the 16th century until the mid-20th century. The Misson hub has images of two different boats used for the service, one a simple punt with four passengers, and one a steam boat, with large paddle wheels and a crew of three.

Significant repairs were carried out to the fabric of the church in 1882 and 1886, but on 23 September 1893 the tower was hit by lightning. Large pieces of masonry crashed down through the building, and four fires started, which caused considerable damage. The quick-thinking parish clerk, Robert Pinder, entered the building to rescue a chest of documents, including the parish registers and the insurance policy. Most of the building, apart from the chancel, was too damaged to be usable, but enough repairs had been made by June 1894 to allow the Bishop of Southwell to reopen it, although reconstruction continued for another two years.

Herbert H Skinner was the vicar from 1927 to 1933, and early in his term of office, the county council threatened to take over the Misson Church of England School because it did not meet the education authority's standards. This move seemed to be favoured by many in the village, but Skinner insisted that he was in the process of improving standards. In 1930 he was given a three-month ultimatum by many parents, who said they would withdraw their children from the school if things did not improve, but the threatened strike was called off at the last minute.

As well as the parish church, there were a significant number of Methodists within the village. A Methodist Society was first formed in 1793, although they did now have a building in which to meet. They built a chapel in 1818, although its site is not known, and the Primitive Methodists built one in 1822, again at an unknown location. A survey conducted in 1851 showed that 140-160 people attended the parish church, 100 adults plus 25 children formed the congregation of the Wesleyan Methodist chapel, while the Primitive Methodists attracted 15 people on Sunday morning and 69 in the evening. A new Primitive Methodist chapel was built close to the parish church in 1873, and a new Wesleyan Methodist chapel was constructed on Top Street in 1897. Both buildings have since been converted to houses. There was also a Primitive Methodist chapel at Misson Springs between the 1890s and the mid-20th century, when it was demolished.

During the First World War, a camp for prisoners of war was established to the north of the village, just to the south of the railway line. They were a 'migratory gang', who worked within the agricultural sector. During the Second World War, another camp was established at the site of the present Misson Mill, which housed prisoners of war and displaced people.

=== Drainage ===
Misson lies on the north bank of the River Idle, and at the southern edge of Hatfield Chase, a large flat area of land which prior to the 17th century was mainly marshland, with a few isolated settlements where the ground was slightly higher. The character of the area changed significantly when Cornelius Vermuyden was appointed by Charles I to drain the chase in 1626. He changed the courses of the River Don and the Torne, while the course of River Idle, which had formerly turned to the north at the eastern edge of the parish, was blocked off by a dam, and the waters diverted along Bycarrs Dyke to enter the River Trent at West Stockwith. The point at which the dam was constructed is now known as Idle Stop. A series of straight ditches were cut across the landscape, to enable the marshland to be used for agriculture. Vermuyden's original scheme had been funded by selling the land he would have gained by carrying out the work to a number of participants, who were mostly Dutch. The land they then owned was called scotted land, and required them to pay scots or taxes to fund the ongoing maintenance of the drainage.

Some 60,000 acres (24,000 ha) had been affected by the works, of which Vermuyden and the Participants received one third, the king received one third, and the local commoners received the final third. In Misson, Vermuyden and his daughters Sarah and Catherine were granted half of the 2,600 acres (1,100 ha) which comprised Misson Waters and Commons for their lifetimes. They paid ground rent of £180 per year. Drainage work in the parish of Misson had been largely funded by a grant of £10,000 from the Crown. Other Participants had also been granted land in Misson, and there was unrest among the locals in this and other local villages. Although Vermeuden had been successful in carrying out similar works in the Low Countries, there were issues with those on Hatfield Chase, and remedial action was taken over the next few years. The onset of the English Civil War created confusion, and enabled locals to sabotage the works, re-flooding parts of the Chase by raising flood gates and breaking down banks and sluices. Riots broke out in 1650, and there was general unrest until matters were resolved in 1719.

Efforts to improve the drainage of the area were made in the 18th, 19th and 20th centuries. The engineer John Smeaton was asked to advise on improvements in the 1760s and 1770s. He declared that Misson Deeps and the land near Bull Hassocks were the most difficult to drain, because of the remoteness from an outfall. From Misson, the water was carried by the Snow Sewer to an outfall at Ferry Sluice on the River Trent, but Smeaton's recommendations for improvements to the Snow Sewer were not implemented. The Participants continued to manage the drainage scheme until 1862, when an Act of Parliament was obtained to create the Corporation of the Level of Hatfield Chase. Although owners of scotted land were still required to pay scots and other rates, the Act enabled the Corporation to collect rates from all areas which benefitted from the drainage, but where the land was not scotted. Misson was one of 21 townships or parishes which were then required to pay drainage rates.

Following the passing of the Land Drainage Act 1930, responsibility for the management of drainage passed to Internal Drainage Boards (IDBs), and in Misson's case, this was the Finningley IDB. They managed the drainage of most of the parish, although not the slightly higher ground on which the village centre stands. In 2012, Finningley IDB merged with six other internal drainage boards to form the Doncaster East IDB. Water levels are maintained largely by pumping stations. Idle Stop pumping station is located on the banks of the River Idle on the eastern border of the parish, and pumps water from the Cow Pasture Drain, which runs west to east, and the South Idle Drain, which runs north to south. Austerfield Drain runs along the western edge of the parish, and is pumped into the Idle by Newington Pumping Station. Further north, the parish is crossed by Snow Sewer, Owl Drain and Sanderson's Bank South Drain, which are pumped into the Warping Drain by Park Drain Pumping Station, located just to the east of the parish boundary.

=== Railways ===
Misson has been served by two railways in the past. The first was the Gainsborough to Doncaster line of the Great Northern Railway. This opened in 1867, and crossed the northern tip of the parish. There were level crossings at Beech Hill, on the road northwards from Misson Springs, and at Park Drain, on the road to Idle Stop. There was no passenger station, but there were sidings at the latter, which were known as Park Drain Sidings. In 1893, exploratory borings to test for coal were made near Idle Stop by George Dunston, and coal seams were found at depths of 3,142 feet (958 m) and 3,185 feet (971 m). A passenger station opened at the site three years later, and is shown on the 1899 map. Dunston was a Colliery proprietor and mining engineer, and in 1897 applied for a licence to serve alcohol at a hotel he was planning to build at Park Drain. The initial exploration had been undertaken by Dunston, Arthur Wilson and the Duke of Portland, and the application was supported by 65 local landowners, just five of whom owned 2,500 acres (1,000 ha) near the site of the hotel. The licence was granted on the basis that coal mining was expected to start almost immediately.

The Park Drain Hotel was completed by 1899, when Dunston held a dinner there, to outline his plans for the future. A local newspaper noted that the hotel stood in an isolated position, with only some railway men's cottages and a signal box nearby. Dunston expected that a large village or small town would soon be developed near the hotel, as coal mining began. The station served the people of Westwoodside, and the hotel was owned by Whitworth Breweries. It is not clear whether the station was in full operation at that time, as Dunston noted that some of his friends were missing from the dinner, because the railway company would not stop the train on which they were travelling at Park Drain. The start of the First World War and issues with drainage meant that the mining scheme was abandoned. Passenger services were withdrawn in 1955, and freight followed in 1964, but the hotel continued to trade until the 1990s, despite its isolated location. Since 2003, it has been used as offices.

The second railway was the Bawtry to Haxey railway line, which had originally been proposed as the Tickhill Light Railway in 1901. However, that scheme foundered, and when the Great Northern Railway built it, the link to Tickhill was omitted. The ambitions for it to be a major route for the transport of coal were replaced by it being little more than an agricultural siding, usually known as the Misson Branch. The line was a little under 8 miles (13 km) long, with a goods depot at Misson, and opened on 12 August 1912. At some point prior to 1923, much of the line to the east of Misson was lifted, and there are stories that the materials were shipped to France during the First World War, but no hard documentary evidence to prove it. There was a private siding at the goods station, for Yorkshire Amalgamated Products, and another private siding to the west of the village centre, serving William Oates's sand quarry.

The branch became part of the London and North Eastern Railway in 1923, and a speed limit of 25 miles per hour (40 km/h) was enforced. By 1960 this had been reduced to 15 miles per hour (24 km/h). There were several ungated level crossings between Bawtry and Misson, and only Station Road at Misson had the benefit of gates. Drivers were told to slow down to 10 miles per hour (16 km/h) at them, and to be prepared to stop if necessary. Misson had a simple loop line, and Squires says that this usually meant that the train, which had arrived with the engine at the front, would be propelled back to Bawtry, with the engine at the rear. However, the 1964 map shows a much longer loop to the north of the tracks as well as the short loop to the south. Prior to the nationalisation of the railways in 1948, agricultural and sand traffic was sufficient that two return trips were made on most days, but by the 1960s, trains were operated "as required" and were fairly infrequent. Soon afterwards, the line slipped into oblivion, and even the date of its closure is uncertain, with some sources quoting 7 December 1964, and others 1 April 1965. In May 1966, the Eastern Ragion of British Railways produced a plan of parts of the line, when they were about to sell 2 miles 77 chains (4.8 km) of it to Nottinghamshire Crop Driers of Misson.

== See also ==
- Listed buildings in Misson, Nottinghamshire

== Bibliography ==
- Barnett, A L (1984). The Railways of the South Yorkshire Coalfield from 1880. Railway Correspondence And Travel Society. ISBN 978-0-901115-58-4.
- CAAMS (September 2017). "Misson Conservation Area Appraisal & Management Plan" (PDF). Bassetlaw District Council. Archived (PDF) from the original on 8 May 2023.
- Cory, Vernon (1985). Hatfield and Axholme – An Historical Review. Providence Press. ISBN 978-0-903803-15-1.
- Gibson, Walcot (1913). The concealed coalfield of Yorkshire and Nottinghamshire. His Majesty's Stationery Office.
- Skempton, Sir Alec; et al. (2002). A Biographical Dictionary of Civil Engineers in Great Britain and Ireland: Vol 1: 1500 to 1830. Thomas Telford. ISBN 978-0-7277-2939-2.
- Squires, Stewart E (1988). The Lost Railways of Lincolnshire. Castlemead Publications. ISBN 978-0-948555-14-5.
- Toop, Christopher; et al. (January 2010). "Biodiversity Action Plan" (PDF). Finningley IDB. Archived from the original (PDF) on 4 October 2011.
- White (1853). White's Directory of Nottinghamshire. cited on Genuki
- Wrottesley, John (1979). The Great Northern Railway: Volume I: Origins and Development. London: B T Batsford. ISBN 978-0-7134-1590-2.
