= Listed buildings in Gringley on the Hill =

Gringley on the Hill is a civil parish in the Bassetlaw District of Nottinghamshire, England. The parish contains 23 listed buildings that are recorded in the National Heritage List for England. Of these, one is listed at Grade II*, the middle of the three grades, and the others are at Grade II, the lowest grade. The parish contains the village of Gringley on the Hill and the surrounding countryside. Most of the listed buildings are houses, cottages and associated structures, farmhouses and farm buildings. The other listed buildings include a church and a former chapel, a village cross, a canal milepost, a former windmill and a war memorial.

== Key ==
Grade	Criteria
II*	Particularly important buildings of more than special interest
II	Buildings of national importance and special interest

== Buildings ==
Name and location	Photograph	Date	Notes	Grade
St Peter and St Paul's Church; 53.40768°N 0.89441°W		13th century	The church has been altered and extended through the centuries, and the south aisle was added in 1910–1912. It is built in stone, partly rendered and pebbledashed, and has slate roofs. The church consists of a nave with a clerestory, north and south aisles, a chancel and a west tower. The tower has two stages, diagonal buttresses, two string courses, and a moulded embattled parapet with corner crocketed pinnacles. On the west side is a 14th-century doorway with a chamfered surround, above which is a triple lancet window and stair lights, on the north side is a blocked round-headed Norman doorway, and the upper stage contains two-light bell openings with hood moulds.	II*
Village cross 53.40793°N 0.89524°W		14th century	The cross stands at a road junction. It is about 7 feet (2.1 m) high, and consists of a broken octagonal shaft with a square base, on a square plinth of four steps. There is a niche on the east side.	II
The Rood House; 53.40786°N 0.89500°W	—	c. 1730	The house is in brick with a floor band, an eaves band, cogged eaves, and a pantile roof with coped tumbled gables. There are two storeys and an L-shaped plan, with a front of three bays, the left bay gabled, and a rear wing. On the front is a doorway with a reeded surround and a fanlight, and in the angle at the rear is a porch. The windows are a mix, and include fixed lights, casements and sashes, some of the latter horizontally-sliding.	II
Park House Farmhouse; 53.40760°N 0.90891°W		18th century	The farmhouse is in brick with stone dressings, cogged and dentilled eaves, and a pantile roof with a coped tumbled gable. There are two storeys and three bays. The central doorway has plain jambs and a segmental head, and the windows are sashes.	II
The Green, conservatory and wall 53.40649°N 0.88599°W	—	18th century	A brick farmhouse on a plinth, with a floor band, an eaves band, cogged eaves, and slate roofs with coped and tumbled gables. There are two storeys and a main range of five bays. In the centre is a doorway with a decorated moulded surround and a triple-octagon fanlight, and the windows are sashes. To the left is an extension with two storeys, a single bay, and a conservatory on the front, and beyond that are two further two-storey single-bay extensions. At the rear is a round-headed doorway with a fanlight containing Gothic tracery. The windows in the extension and at the rear are a mix of casements and horizontally-sliding sashes. The boundary wall is in brick with stone coping, it is ramped, and contains a doorway with a gable.	II
The Homestead; 53.41083°N 0.89319°W		Mid 18th century	The farmhouse is in brick with a cogged and dentilled eaves band, and a pantile roof with coped and tumbled gables. There are two storeys and attics and three bays, and a later two-storey two-bay wing to the south. The doorway on the front has a fanlight, and the windows are sashes; all the openings have segmental heads. At the rear is a doorway with a reeded surround and a pediment.	II
1 High Street; 53.40782°N 0.89551°W		Late 18th century	A house that was later extended, it is in brick on a rendered plinth, with stone dressings, a floor band, an eaves band, cogged and dentilled eaves, and a pantile roof with cogged and tumbled gables. There are two storeys and attics, and four bays. On the front are two doorways, the right doorway with a fanlight. The windows are sashes.	II
Pigeoncote, stables and granary, Church Farm; 53.40743°N 0.89428°W		Late 18th century	The farm buildings are in brick with pantile roofs. The pigeoncote has an eaves band, cogged eaves, brick coped gables, three stages, a square plan and a single bay. It contains a stable door and casement windows, above which is a door with a segmental head, and in the top stage are four tiers of pigeon holes. The attached stable and granary have two storeys and three bays. They contain various openings, some with segmental heads, and there is an external flight of steps and a round-headed kennel.	II
Gringley Grange Farm House; 53.40523°N 0.87017°W		Late 18th century	The farmhouse is in brick with stone dressings, an eaves band, cogged eaves, and a pantile roof. There are two storeys and attics, and an L-shaped plan, with a front range of three bays, and a wing and a later extension at the rear. The central doorway has a plain surround and a fanlight, and the windows are sashes with splayed lintels.	II
Ravenhill and wall 53.40841°N 0.89156°W		Late 18th century	The house, which was later heightened and extended, is in brick with floor bands, dentilled eaves and pantile roofs. There are two storeys and attics, and an L-shaped plan with a south front of six irregular bays. On the front are two canted bay windows, most of the other windows are sashes, some with segmental heads, and there are gabled dormers. At the rear is a three-storey stair turret. The boundary wall is in brick with stone coping, on which there is about 10 metres (33 ft) of ornate cast iron railings, and the wall contains a boarded gate.	II
North Beeches and South Beeches; 53.40796°N 0.88874°W		c. 1790	A house that was extended to the right in the 19th century. It is stuccoed, and has a floor band, moulded eaves and a hipped slate roof. There are two storeys, and an L-shaped plan with a main range of six bays. On the main front is a doorway with pilasters, a fanlight, a frieze and a moulded hood, flanked by caned bay windows, and above are three sash windows with stuccoed architraves. The extension has a French window and sash windows. In the south front are two doorways with moulded architraves, sash windows and a conservatory.	II
Gringley Hall and boundary wall 53.40751°N 0.89610°W		c. 1800	The house is in rendered brick with stone dressings and a hipped slate roof. There are two storeys and attics, a main block with a square plan and sides of three bays, a single-bay extension to the right, and a later flat-roofed extension to the left. The doorway in the east front has Doric columns, and a round-headed opening with a fanlight. In the south front are two canted bay windows, and the other windows are sashes. The boundary wall is in red brick with ramped stone coping, and it contains two square stone gate piers, with recessed panels and pyramidal caps, and between them is a pair of Gothic cast iron gates.	II
Canal milepost 53.41951°N 0.89019°W		Late 18th to early 19th century	The milepost is on the south side of the Chesterfield Canal near Shaw Lock. It consists of a stone slab post with a rounded head inscribed '42', indicating the distance from Chesterfield.	II
Bleak House; 53.40813°N 0.89254°W		Early 19th century	A brick house with stone dressings and a pantile roof. There are two storeys and three bays. The central doorway has a doorcase in glass fibre, with a moulded surround, a fanlight and a hood. The windows are sashes with channelled wedge lintels and keystones.	II
Cross Hill Cottage; 53.40803°N 0.89507°W		Early 19th century	The house is in brick on a rendered plinth, with stone dressings, dentilled eaves and a pantile roof. There are two storeys and three bays. The central doorway has pilasters and a frieze, and the windows are sashes. All the openings have rendered wedge lintels.	II
Pigeoncote, Gringley Vicarage; 53.40782°N 0.89522°W		Early 19th century	The pigeoncote is in brick, with a floor band, an eaves band, cogged eaves, and a pantile roof with tumbled coped gables. There are two storeys, a square plan and a single bay. The openings have segmental heads, and there are two tiers of pigeonholes.	II
Prospect House and wall 53.40852°N 0.89094°W		Early 19th century	The house is in brick, rendered and colourwashed, with stone dressings, an eaves band, cogged eaves, and a pantile roof with coped gables. There are two stories and attics, and an L-shaped plan, with a front range of three bays and a later rear extension. In the centre is a porch with a moulded hood and a door with a fanlight. The windows on the front are sashes with keystones, and elsewhere there are casement windows. The boundary wall is in brick, it is ramped, with stone coping, and contains two square brick piers and an iron gate.	II
Gringley Windmill; 53.40727°N 0.90306°W		c. 1830	The former windmill is in brick with dentilled eaves, and consists of a circular tapering tower. It has four stages, and contains a doorway and casement windows, all with segmental heads.	II
Mill House; 53.40754°N 0.90321°W		c. 1830	The house is in brick, mainly rendered, with stone dressings, dentilled eaves and a hipped pantile roof. There are two storeys and an L-shaped plan, with a main range of three bays and a single-storey single-bay extension. The doorway has a rendered architrave and a fanlight, and the windows are a mix of sashes and casements, some with segmental heads, and there is a round-headed stair window.	II
Vicarage and boundary wall 53.40754°N 0.89486°W		c. 1837	The vicarage is in gault and red brick, with details in stone and stucco, and a hipped slate roof. There are two storeys, a main block with a square plan and sides of three bays, and a single-storey single-bay extension on the left. In the centre is a doorway with a moulded surround, an entablature and a moulded hood. It is flanked by square bay windows, and the other windows are sashes with rendered lintels. The boundary wall is in gault brick with patterning in red brick, cross-shaped openings, and terracotta coping. It contains three square piers with square stone caps, and a pair of gate piers with recessed panels and pyramidal stone caps.	II
Sunday School; 53.40902°N 0.89587°W		1838	Originally a Methodist chapel, the building is in brick on a stone plinth, and has a pantile roof with coped gables and kneelers. There is a single storey, two bays, and a rear lean-to extension. On the front is a central doorway and sash windows, all with segmental heads. Above the doorway is an inscribed and dated plaque, and the southeast corner of the building is canted and corbelled.	II
Coach house, Gringley Vicarage; 53.40771°N 0.89531°W		Mid 19th century	The former coach house is in brick, with a floor band, cogged eaves, and a pantile roof with coped gables. There are two storeys and three bays. The building contains two elliptical carriage openings, a stable door with a segmental head, and other openings, some blocked.	II
War memorial 53.40749°N 0.90246°W		1920	The war memorial is in the cemetery, and consists of a cross in Portland stone. This has an octagonal shaft with a carved sword, and stands on a hexagonal plinth on a projecting base. On the plinth are inscriptions and the names of those lost in the two World Wars.	II
