= Bawtry to Haxey railway line =

Railway line in England

The Bawtry to Haxey railway line was a line built on the border of Nottinghamshire, Lincolnshire and Yorkshire, opening in 1912. It was part of an earlier scheme to convey coal from a new colliery at Tickhill to Grimsby for export. After authorisation, its promoters did not proceed with construction, and when the South Yorkshire Joint Railway was built, serving Tickhill and other developing pits, that line was a better outlet for the minerals and the promoters lost interest in the Tickhill line.

Eventually the Great Northern Railway adopted the powers and built the line, but it never carried mineral trunk hauls and became simply an insignificant agricultural siding. It closed in 1964 or 1965.

== Conception ==
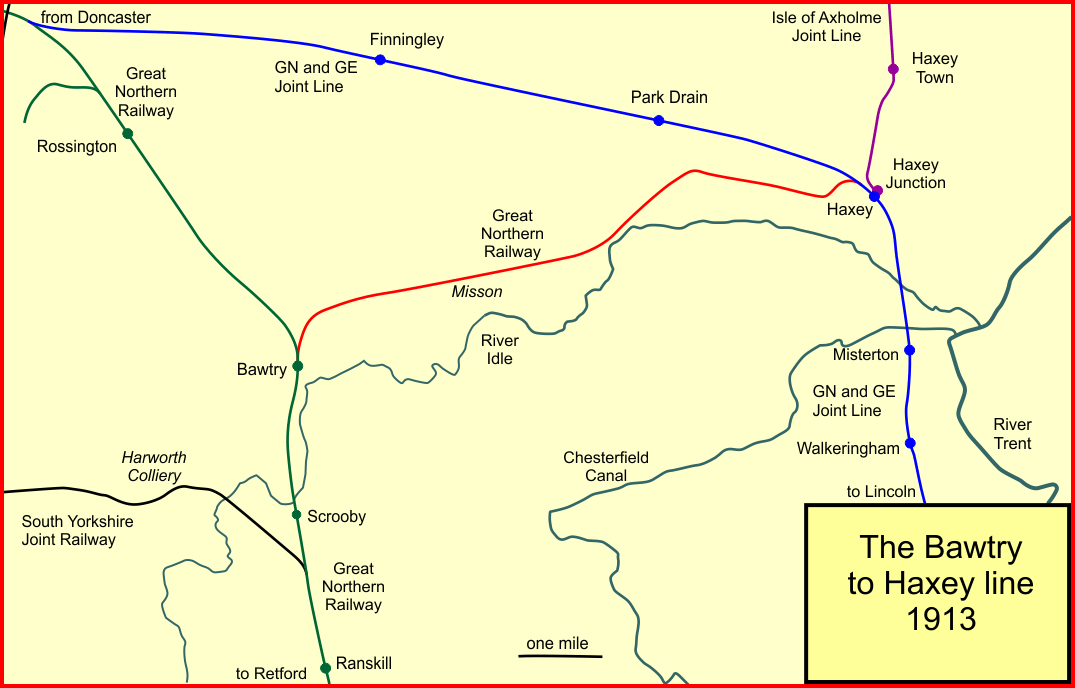
The Bawtry to Haxey line

Towards the end of the 19th century, a new colliery was being developed at Tickhill, in South Yorkshire about three miles west of Bawtry. Rail access to Grimsby was critical to the commercial success of the pit, and the owners promoted the Tickhill Light Railway. This was to run from the colliery at Tickhill to a junction with the Great Northern Railway at Bawtry, on the East Coast Main Line, and from there it was to run on to a junction with the Great Northern and Great Eastern Joint Railway at Haxey. It was expected to be able to continue from there to Goole over the Axholme Joint Railway, at the time being promoted by the North Eastern Railway and the Lancashire and Yorkshire Railway jointly. The section from Bawtry to Haxey followed closely the route originally authorised to the Great Northern Railway in 1846, but never built by them.

The promoters of the proposed line got a light railway order, the Tickhill Light Railway Order 1901, dated 7 August 1901 for a line from Haxey to Bawtry and Tickhill. However, at this stage they did nothing towards construction, and meanwhile the Axholme Joint Railway was opened to Haxey on 3 November 1904.

Although they did not take any steps toward construction, the impending opening of the Axholme line may have prompted the Tickhill promoters to renew their authorisation: on 22 September 1904 they were granted the Tickhill Light Railway (Extension of Time) Order 1904.

== The Great Northern Railway takes over ==
On 30 May 1907 the Great Northern Railway board decided to apply for an order to take over the Tickhill Light Railway's powers themselves, paying £2,300 to the original promoters; the transfer was granted by the Tickhill Light Railway (Amendment and Transfer) Order 1908 in July 1908. The intended junction at Haxey was simplified; originally it had been proposed to cross directly to the Axholme Joint Railway, but this was not needed by the Great Northern Railway; the simplification would save £10,000. Still not making this a priority, in June 1910 the board ordered construction between Bawtry and Haxey, as soon as land could be obtained, at an estimated cost of £88,000. Haxey was on the Great Northern and Great Eastern Joint Line; as the connection was planned to bring coal to the line for transport south, the Great Eastern Railway agreed to pay for part of Haxey junction. The Great Eastern Railway interest must have been to get access for its trains to the Tickhill colliery area, although they would have needed to construct the Bawtry to Tickhill section themselves.

A trade periodical reported in November 1911 that

A start has been made in the last few days on the new line which the Great Northern Railway are constructing between Bawtry and Haxey and which will be a valuable link in view of prospective colliery developments. The line which will be eight miles long is to cost £30,000 and will occupy about twelve months in construction. The contractors are Messrs H. Lovatt Ltd. Collieries have been spoken of at South Carr and Misterton and for these, together with the new pit to be sunk at Harworth [this became [Harworth Main Colliery], the line will be very valuable. Some months ago, a survey was made for a siding from the Harworth Colliery to connect with the Great Northern line near Scrooby. As most of the coal will go eastward, the connection will very likely be carried to Bawtry, in which event it would be an easy matter to extend the line via Harworth to Tickhill and link up with the Five Companies' line. The Order gives power to carry the line to Tickhill.

Harworth was located midway between Rossington and Firbeck. The exploration lease was held by a German combine headed by Hugo Stinnes. A line connecting the site to the East Coast Main Line at Scrooby was authorised in August 1912 and a temporary line laid for the sinkers, using a German locomotive. With the outbreak of war, all work at Harworth was suspended in August 1914.

== Opening ==
The Bawtry to Haxey line was opened for goods traffic only on 26 August 1912; (Note: Squires says 12 August 1912.) it consisted of eight miles of single line. In the meantime the Tickhill colliery had been connected to the South Yorkshire Joint Railway, and construction of the Bawtry to Tickhill section was no longer planned. As predicted by the Iron and Coal Trades Review, the Harworth connection to the main line was made at Scrooby, south of Bawtry and facing south. As a result there was no coal traffic on the Haxey line. There were sidings at Misson goods depot, an agricultural location intermediately on the line, and a private siding for Yorkshire Amalgamated Products. There were three sand and gravel quarries, two near Bawtry and one about half a mile west of Misson. Passenger trains were never contemplated.

It is very doubtful if through traffic was carried between Bawtry and Haxey. It is possible that the central portion of the line was lifted and shipped to France during World War I. The Haxey end was used for wagon storage, having been closed to ordinary traffic before 1923. About three-quarters of a mile of track eastwards from Misson was removed about that time. In 1950 a locomotive went on to the Haxey stub to move wagons and derailed due to the poor state of the track, and immediate permanent closure of the eastern extremity followed.

The western end from Bawtry continued in use due to the sand traffic; in London North Eastern Railway days, two round trips daily were often required. According to Squires, there was no run-round facility on the branch, so returning trains were propelled to Bawtry. However, the Ordnance Survey map for 1921 shows a passing loop to the south of the line at Misson, while in 1964 there was a much longer passing loop to the north of the line as well.

Instead of becoming a trunk haul mineral line, the section from Bawtry to Misson was little more than a farming siding and this finally closed on 1 April 1965, or 7 December 1964, according to other authorities.

== See also ==
Lincolnshire lines of the Great Northern Railway
