= Listed buildings in Austerfield =

Austerfield is a civil parish in the City of Doncaster, South Yorkshire, England. The parish contains three listed buildings that are recorded in the National Heritage List for England. Of these, one is listed at Grade II*, the middle of the three grades, and the others are at Grade II, the lowest grade. The parish contains the village of Austerfield and the surrounding area. All the listed buildings are in the village, and consist of a church, a house and a farmhouse.

== Key ==
Grade	Criteria
II*	Particularly important buildings of more than special interest
II	Buildings of national importance and special interest

== Buildings ==
Name and location	Photograph	Date	Notes	Grade
St Helen's Church; 53.44486°N 1.00528°W		11th century	The church has been altered and extended through the centuries, including a restoration, and alterations by C. Hodgson Fowler in 1897–98. It is built in stone with a roof of red tile and slate, and consists of a nave, a north aisle, a south porch, and a chancel with a north vestry. At the west end is a central pilaster buttress flanked by lancet windows, above which is a bellcote with a string course, and two pointed arches under a coped gable with a cross. The south doorway is Norman, and has two orders of shafts with carved capitals and a tympanum containing a carved dragon.	II*
The Manor House; 53.44739°N 1.00511°W		Late 16th century	The house, which was extended in the early 17th century, is timber framed with later brick infill, and has a pantile roof, hipped on the cross-wing. There are two storeys and an L-shaped plan, consisting of a range of two bays, and the original part forming a two-bay cross-wing on the right. On the front is a later porch, and the windows are casements. The house was at one time the home of William Bradford, who became governor of Plymouth Colony.	II
The Farmhouse; 53.44454°N 1.00629°W	—	Late 18th century	The farm is in brick with a hipped pantile roof. There are three storeys and three bays, a two-storey two-bay wing recessed on the right, and a lower two-storey two-bay later addition. In the centre is a porch with two fluted columns and a dentilled cornice, and a doorway with a fanlight. The windows on the lower two floors are sashes in architraves with flat brick arches, and on the upper floor they are centre-pivoted casement windows.	II
