= Listed buildings in Everton, Nottinghamshire =

Everton is a civil parish in the Bassetlaw District of Nottinghamshire, England. The parish contains 23 listed buildings that are recorded in the National Heritage List for England. Of these, one is listed at Grade II*, the middle of the three grades, and the others are at Grade II, the lowest grade. The parish contains the village of Everton and the surrounding countryside. Most of the listed buildings are houses, cottages, farmhouses, and associated structures. The other listed buildings consist of a church, a monument in the churchyard, a former malthouse, a canal milepost, a former windmill, a war memorial and a telephone kiosk.

== Key ==
Grade	Criteria
II*	Particularly important buildings of more than special interest
II	Buildings of national importance and special interest

== Buildings ==
Name and location	Photograph	Date	Notes	Grade
Holy Trinity Church and wall 53.41431°N 0.96127°W		11th century	The church has been altered and extended through the centuries, and is mainly in stone, with slate roofs. It consists of a nave with a clerestory, a north aisle with a Lady chapel, a south porch, a chancel with a south chapel, and a west tower. The tower has three stages, two moulded string courses, quoins, a clock face, an eaves band, two gargoyles, and a moulded embattled parapet. The porch and the nave also have embattled parapets. The boundary wall is in brick with triangular stone coping, and contain a pair of cast iron gateposts and decorative gates, over which is a wrought iron overthrow with a domed lantern.	II*
Wisteria Cottage; 53.41369°N 0.96217°W		17th century	The cottage is rendered and has a pantile roof. There is a single storey and an attic, two bays, and two later rear lean-to extensions. It has an off-centre door with timber jambs, the windows are casements, and in the attic are two sloping dormers.	II
Glebe Farmhouse; 53.41422°N 0.96228°W		18th century	The farmhouse is in pebbledashed brick, with a floor band, and a pantile roof with brick coped gables and kneelers. There are two storeys and three bays. On the front is a central doorway and casement windows.	II
Harlington House; 53.41481°N 0.96208°W		18th century	A brick house with a floor band, an eaves band, cogged eaves, and a pantile roof with brick coped gables and kneelers. There are two storeys and an L-shaped plan, with a front range of three bays and a rear lean-to. On the front are two doorways, one with a segmental head, and casement windows with segmental heads.	II
Metcalfe House, Cottage and wall 53.41253°N 0.96056°W		Mid 18th century	A house, later divided into a house and a cottage, in rendered brick, with a floor band, and pantile roofs. There are two storeys and a T-shaped plan, with a main range of four bays, a projecting wing on the left, and a rear wing. The left wing contains a two-storey canted bay window, the other windows are sashes, and the door has a fanlight. The boundary wall is in coped brick, and extends for about 100 metres (330 ft). It contains a gabled elliptical-headed gateway, and to the right is another gateway flanked by square brick piers with moulded square stone caps.	II
Pear Tree Farmhouse; 53.41155°N 0.96043°W		Mid 18th century	The farmhouse is in brick, with dentilled eaves, and a pantile roof with brick coped gables and kneelers. There are three storeys and three bays, a service wing to the right with two storeys and one bay, and a lean-to extension. In the centre of the main block is a portico with two Tuscan columns and a moulded hood, and a door with a fanlight. The windows are sashes.	II
The Old Malthouse, outbuilding and water pump 53.41350°N 0.96022°W		Mid 18th century	The malthouse, later converted into a house, is in colourwashed brick, with dentilled eaves, and a pantile roof with a coped gable. There are two storeys and six bays. At the rear is a gabled porch, and the windows are a mix of sashes and casements. The attached outbuilding has a single storey and an L-shaped plan, and contains a doorway with a segmental head. The water pump is in cast iron with a gadrooned cap and a finial.	II
Davenport House and wall 53.41133°N 0.96156°W	—	Late 18th century	The house is in pebbledashed brick on a rendered plinth, with stone sills, dentilled eaves, and a hipped pantile roof. There are three storeys and an L-shaped plan, with a front range of three bays, and a later rear wing. In the centre is an open timber porch, and a doorway that has a moulded surround with paterae, a fanlight with Gothic tracery, and a modillion cornice. To its left is a canted bay window, and the other windows are sashes. The boundary wall is in brick with stone coping, it contains 14 buttresses, and extends for about 60 metres (200 ft).	II
Glebe Cottage; 53.41413°N 0.96229°W		Late 18th century	The cottage, which was later extended, is in colourwashed rendered brick, with a floor band, cogged eaves, and a pantile roof with brick coped gables and kneelers. There are two storeys, three bays, and a lower single-bay extension on the left. On the front are two doorways, and above the left doorway is a blind segmental-arched panel. The windows are horizontally-sliding sashes.	II
Hall Farm; 53.41082°N 0.95828°W		Late 18th century	The farmhouse is in brick, with stone sills, dentilled eaves and a pantile roof. There are two storeys and an L-shaped plan, with a front range of three bays, a single-storey single-bay extension to the right, and a rear wing. The central doorway has pilasters, moulded corbels, an entablature and a hood, and a door with a fanlight, and the windows are sashes. On the rear wing is a gabled porch, and sash windows with segmental heads.	II
Pusto Hill Farm House, wall and outbuilding 53.40313°N 0.95486°W	—	Late 18th century	The farmhouse is in colourwashed brick, with banded corner pilasters, a floor band, a string course, an eaves band, a cornice, and a slate roof. There are two storeys, and three bays, the middle bay pedimented, and lean-to side wings. The windows are a mix of sashes and casements. A curved brick wall links the farmhouse to an outbuilding with one storey, one bay, and a pantile roof.	II
Canal milepost 53.41060°N 0.93670°W		Late 18th to early 19th century	The milepost on the south side of Chesterfield Canal consists of a stone slab post with a rounded head. It is inscribed with the distance from Chesterfield.	II
Evans Monument; 53.41441°N 0.96135°W		1814	The monument is in the churchyard of Holy Trinity Church to the north of the church, and is to the memory of members of the Evans family. It is in stone, and consists of a square column on a chamfered plinth, with convex cornered panels on each face, a cross-gabled cap with acroteria, and inscriptions on the sides. The monument is enclosed by a chamfered square curb.	II
Church Street Cottage; 53.41390°N 0.96045°W	—	Early 19th century	The cottage is in brick, with a sill band, wooden eaves and a pantile roof. There are two storeys and two bays. The doorway has a segmental head, and to the left is a passage doorway with an elliptical head. The windows are horizontally-sliding sashes, those in the ground floor with segmental heads.	II
North End Cottage and wall 53.41200°N 0.96039°W		Early 19th century	The cottage is in rendered brick with stone sills, rendered eaves and a pantile roof. There are two storeys, two bays, and a rear lean-to. The doorway in the left gable end has a moulded architrave, a fanlight and a hood, and the windows are sashes. The boundary wall is in brick with stone coping, and contains an elliptical-headed gateway.	II
Rose Cottage and wall 53.41194°N 0.96042°W	—	Early 19th century	The cottage is in rendered brick with stucco sills, rendered eaves and a pantile roof. There are two storeys and two bays. On the front is a latticed timber porch with a flat roof, and the windows are sashes. The boundary wall is in brick with stone coping.	II
The Old Vicarage; 53.41417°N 0.96099°W	—	Early 19th century	The vicarage, later a private house, is in stuccoed brick, with stone sills, deep moulded eaves and a hipped slate roof. There are two storeys, a square plan with fronts of four bays, and a wing projecting to the west. On the north front is an engaged portico with two Tuscan columns, a moulded cornice on scrolled brackets, and a moulded segmental pediment with an arched central portion. To the right is a semicircular bow window, and the other windows are casements with segmental heads and moulded arched pediments on scrolled brackets. On the street front are two French windows flanked by engaged Tuscan colonettes with moulded hoods, and above are two casement windows with Tuscan colonettes and segmental moulded hoods, and the west front has a Doric portico, and a doorway with a moulded surround, colonnettes and a fanlight.	II
White Lodge and wall 53.41444°N 0.96255°W		Early 19th century	The house is in stuccoed brick on a rendered plinth, with stone sills and a hipped slate roof. There are two storeys, an L-shaped plan, and a front range of three bays. In the centre is a doorway with a panelled architrave and a moulded hood. The windows are sashes, those in the ground floor with recessed panels. The boundary wall is in brick, it is coped and ramped, and contains two square brick gate piers with recessed panels and moulded square stone caps.	II
Mill House; 53.40587°N 0.96071°W	—	c. 1830	The house is in brick with dentilled eaves and a pantile roof. There are two storeys and two bays, and a single-storey single-bay lean-to. On the front is a gabled porch, a fixed window, a casement window, and horizontally-sliding sash windows, some with segmental heads.	II
Everton Windmill; 53.40618°N 0.96058°W		c. 1840	The former windmill is in tarred brick. It is cylindrical and tapering, with four stages, stone sills and cogged eaves. The windmill contains doors and windows, all with segmental heads.	II
Boiler House and Chimney, Everton Windmill; 53.40607°N 0.96054°W		Late 19th century	The boiler house is in brick and has a pantile roof, a single storey and three bays. At the rear is a detached brick chimney about 50 feet (15 m) high. This has a square base with a projecting band, and a tapered square stack with a cogged and corbelled cap.	II
War memorial 53.40931°N 0.96186°W	—	1922	The war memorial is in Everton Cemetery, and it consists of a blue granite Celtic cross on a square plinth, on a three-step base of Portland stone. At the base of the shaft is a carved wreath, and on the plinth are an inscription and the names of those lost in the two World Wars.	II
Telephone kiosk 53.41215°N 0.96080°W		1935	The K6 type telephone kiosk in High Street was designed by Giles Gilbert Scott. Constructed in cast iron with a square plan and a dome, it has three unperforated crowns in the top panels.	II
