= Church of St Helena, Austerfield =

Anglican church in South Yorkshire, England

Church of St Helena
- St Helena's Church
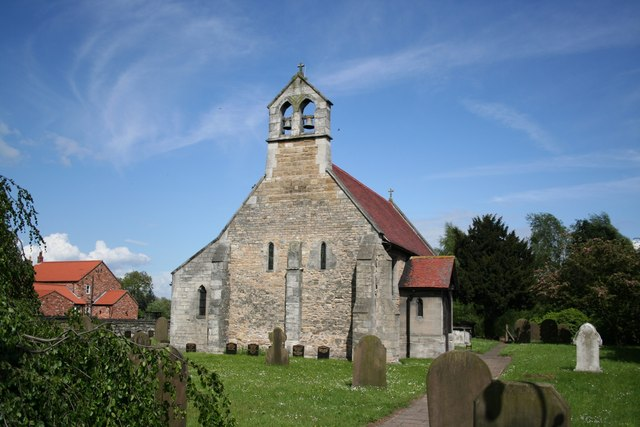
- Church of St Helena, Austerfield
- Church of St Helena
- 53.4448°N 1.0052°W
- OS grid reference: SK 661 946
- Location: Austerfield, South Yorkshire
- Country: England
- Denomination: Anglican
- Website: www.achurchnearyou.com/church/17710/

History
- Former name: St Helen
- Founder: John de Busli
- Dedication: St Helena

Architecture
- Functional status: Active

Administration
- Diocese: Southwell and Nottingham
- Archdeaconry: Newark
- Deanery: Bassetlaw and Bawtry
- Benefice: Bawtry w Austerfield, Misson, Everton and Matterse
- Parish: Bawtry with Austerfield

Listed Building – Grade II*
- Designated: 5 June 1968
- Reference no.: 1151575

The Church of St Helena (Note: The church has often been mis-named as the Church of St Helen.) is an Anglican church in the Ecclesiastical Parish of Bawtry with Austerfield, in South Yorkshire, England. The church is known for its links to the Pilgrim Fathers being the baptismal place of William Bradford and where he worshipped as a child. The church is also noted for its dragon motif carved into the tympana above the south doorway, something which is rare in the old West Riding of Yorkshire. Despite being in what is now South Yorkshire, the church belongs to the Diocese of Southwell and Nottingham. The church building was renovated in 1834 and the late 19th-century, and was grade II* listed in 1968.

== History ==
In the very early years of the 8th-century, a synod was held in Austerfield to settle a matter pertaining to Bishop Wilfrid. The Council of Austerfield was called by King Aldfrith in either 702, or 703 to be situated at Austerfield. Whilst there is no evidence of a church at this time, the location was most likely a good geographical point for various parties to meet rather than a noted religious setting, as it was at the southern border of the old Kingdom of Northumbria.

The current church is thought to date to 1180 (although 1080 and 1130 are also mentioned), and Austerfield is recorded as having a church in the Domesday Book (1086). Stone from quarries at Roche was used to build the site on the authorisation of John de Builli. Builli lived in the 12th century, and is recorded as building and giving the "chapels of Bawtry and Austerfield to the convent at Blyth" during the reign of Henry II, which places the date of the gift in the late 12th century. The Historic England listing for the church recognises building efforts on the church in the 11th, 12th, 13th and 14-centuries, with extensions by Hodgson between 1897 and 1898. The village of Austerfield was in the old West Riding of Yorkshire, but was donated to the convent at Blyth, so it came under a diocese outside of the Yorkshire boundaries, a state that continues to this day with the church belonging to the Diocese of Southwell and Nottingham.

Despite several renovations, the church has retained some of its Norman architecture, however, no clerestory was built in the church, and there is no tower either, but at the west end is a two-bell bellcote. In 1834, the pews and the floor were renovated after a period of disrepair. The second set of renovations took place between 1896 and 1898, previous to which, the church consisted of a single aisle separated into a nave and a chancel by a Norman arch. The altar rail dates back to Jacobean times and most of the stained glass is 19th-century; the work of Kempe. There is one stained glass window on the north side of the church by the font, which commemorates the 400-year anniversary of William Bradford's baptism (1589), which was installed in 1991, but not officially dedicated until June 1992, when descendants of Bradford came over from America for the ceremony.

The tympanum stone above the south doorway has a carved dragon (or serpent) upon it with its tail ending in an arrow; this carving is believed to date to the year 800, and is thought to possibly be some way of calculating the dates of Easter. The feature of a tympana with a figure on it is rare in the old West Riding of Yorkshire (according to Pevsner), there being only five other examples in the county, and twelve across Yorkshire altogether. (Note: The full list is Austerfield, Braithwell, Danby Wiske, Emley, Hunmanby, Marton, Seamer, Thorp Arch, Thwing, Wales, Wold Newton, Woolley.) Additionally, the design motif of a dragon is rare in England, with only nine other examples recorded. The columns of the archway are also adorned with beakheads, one of the many churches in Yorkshire with this decoration. Also present inside the church is a Sheela na gig, on an arch of the north aisle facing the altar. This example is one of only 16 Sheela na gigs recorded in England; it was blocked into a wall in the 14th century, and revealed during the renovations in 1896–1898.

The church is notable for being the baptismal place of William Bradford, a governor of the Plymouth Colony. An entry in the parish registers shows "William sone [sic] of William Bradfourth [sic] baptized the XIXth day of March, (Anno Do'ni 1589)." Bradford is also thought to have attended the church in his youth, but the Pilgrim Fathers would gather at the church in nearby Scrooby. It has been suggested that as services at Austerfield were only held every other Sunday, this lack of religious fervour sent Bradford looking elsewhere for his worship. St Helena's was renovated in 1898, and rededicated in the same year by the Bishop of Southwell. An original Norman arcade was discovered during the works, which was opened out by the addition of a new north aisle, paid for by the descendants of American settlers. The renovations were first mooted in 1896 under the designs of architect Hodgson Fowler to a cost of £1,500, with the addition of a vestry which the old church did not have.

There is still some mystery regarding the font, with some accounts stating it was removed from the church before the renovations and is now at the Methodist church in Lound near Retford. Other accounts state the font was used as a cattle trough after the 1834 renovations, and was returned to the church with a new base when the second restoration was complete in 1898. A third source claims the font was taken to America in 1890 and placed in the New England Congregational Church in Chicago.

The church is dedicated to Helena, mother of Constantine I, who is said to have introduced Christianity into the Roman Empire. An ancient will, issued in 1471, states the church is dedicated to St Helen, not St Helena, and this appears to be the reason of several historical mis-namings over the years.

There are three Commonwealth War Graves from both the First and Second World Wars in the churchyard, and there are two memorial plaques for both wars inside the church. The churchyard covers an area of 0.3 acres (0.12 ha) and was extended in 1893, 1903 and 1962. The structure was grade II* listed in 1968. The church is on the long-distance path called the Mayflower trail, that takes in Babworth, Scrooby, Austerfield, Bawtry, Gainsborough and Boston.

== Parish and administration ==
The church is in the ecclesiastical Parish of Bawtry with Austerfield, and the Benefice of Bawtry with Austerfield, Misson, Everton and Mattersey, which is also known as The River Idle Benefice. Even though the church is located at the southernmost tip of Yorkshire, the church is in the Deanery of Bassetlaw and Bawtry, the Archdeaconry of Newark, and the Diocese of Southwell and Nottingham. The main church in the parish is located at Bawtry, some 1.5 miles (2.4 km) to the south-west, and in the early 19th century, the Church of St Helena was described as a chapel of ease. Previously in the Ecclesiastical Parish of Blyth, Bawtry and Austerfield were separated out into their own parish in July 1858.

== See also ==
- Grade II* listed buildings in South Yorkshire
- Listed buildings in Austerfield
