= Austerfield =

Village in South Yorkshire, England

Coordinates: 53.44°N 1.00°W

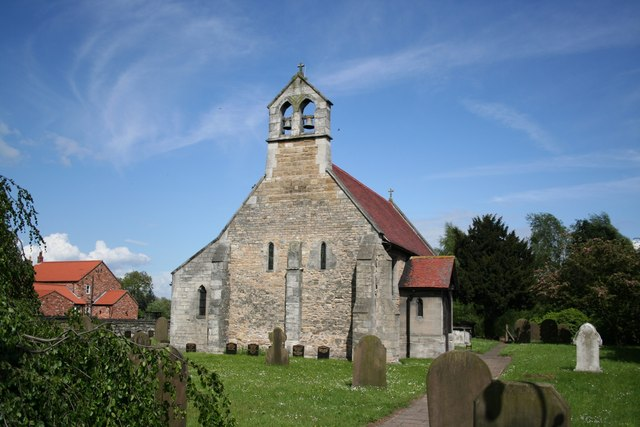
- Saint Helena's Church

- Location within Borough of Doncaster Location within South Yorkshire
- Population: 536 (2011 census)
- Civil parish: Austerfield
- Metropolitan borough: Doncaster
- Metropolitan county: South Yorkshire
- Region: Yorkshire and the Humber
- Country: England
- Sovereign state: United Kingdom
- Post town: DONCASTER
- Postcode district: DN10
- Dialling code: 01302
- Police: South Yorkshire
- Fire: South Yorkshire
- Ambulance: Yorkshire
- UK Parliament: Doncaster East and the Isle of Axholme
- Website: http://www.spanglefish.com/austerfield/

Austerfield is a village and civil parish in the City of Doncaster, South Yorkshire, England. It is 1 mile (1.6 km) to the north-east of the market town of Bawtry on the A614 road, and adjacent to the hamlet of Newington in Nottinghamshire, close to the River Idle. The population in 2001 was 571, which fell to 536 at the 2011 Census.

== Heritage ==
The name Austerfield was first recorded in 715 and derives from the Old English Ouestraefelda (eowestre), which means open land with a sheepfold. It was mentioned in the Domesday Book as belonging to Robert of Mortain, and having 27 villages, 40 freemen, a priest and a church.

The Council of Austerfield was convened here by King Aldfrith of Northumbria in AD 702 and attended by Berhtwald, Archbishop of Canterbury to decide on whether Saint Wilfrid should become Archbishop of York. Austerfield was then on the border between the two Anglo-Saxon kingdoms of Northumbria and Mercia.

Austerfield contains the 11th-century church of St Helena, which was built in 1080 by John de Builli, using stone from quarries at Roche Abbey. The church today has 19th-century several stained-glass windows designed by Charles Eamer Kempe. The nave has a sheela na gig, a rare type of quasi-erotic stone carving of a female figure sometimes found in Norman churches. This had been blocked into a wall in the 14th century and was rediscovered in 1898 during restoration work.

== Notable people ==
In birth order:

- William Bradford (1590–1657), a Pilgrim Father and Governor of Plymouth Colony, was born in Austerfield and baptised in a font rediscovered at a local farm 40 years ago, which can now be seen in the church.
- Roy Clarke (born 1930), an English comedy writer known for the sitcoms Last of the Summer Wine and Open All Hours, was born in Austerfield.

== Transport ==
The nearest railway station to Austerfield is at Doncaster (9½ miles, 15 km). It is served by a bus route, as are Bawtry, Worksop and Sheffield. The A1M trunk road between London and the North passes 5 miles (8 km) to the west of the village.

== See also ==
- Listed buildings in Austerfield
