= Mattersey Priory =

Priory in United Kingdom

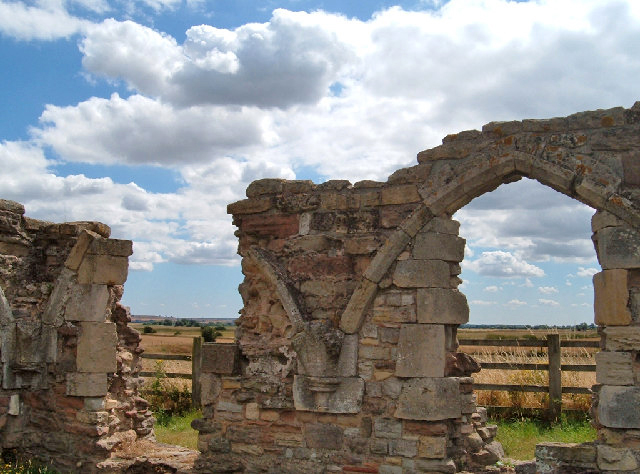
- The ruins of Mattersey Priory

- Location within Nottinghamshire
- Interactive map of Mattersey Priory

Monastery information
- Order: Gilbertine
- Established: c.1185
- Disestablished: 1538
- Dedication: St Helen

People
- Founder: Roger FitzRalph

Site
- Location: Mattersey, Nottinghamshire
- Coordinates: 53.398193°N 0.94369°W
- Visible remains: Ruins
- Public access: Yes; Currently managed by English Heritage and open free of charge.

Mattersey Priory is a former monastery of the Gilbertine Order, located near the village of Mattersey, Nottinghamshire, England. It is managed by English Heritage.

== History ==
The priory was founded by Roger FitzRalph (son of Ranulph de Mattersey) in around 1185, and was dedicated to St Helen. It was constructed on a gravel island in the River Idle, and the area surrounding would have been mostly marshland at the time. The priory was designed to be home to six canons of the Gilbertine Order, although it could accommodate up to ten canons. Unlike many other Gilbertine priories, Mattersey was not a "mixed-house"; it was home to only canons (male), and not to canonesses (female).

The priory's church was destroyed by fire in 1279 and not rebuilt.

The priory is described as "never prosperous". In 1291, it was recorded as having an income of £52. The 1534 Valor Ecclesiasticus records the priory's income as £61 16s. 7d. with a clear annual value of £55 2s. 5d. One possession was the church at Misson, Nottinghamshire.

In 1403, King Henry IV granted the priory permission to hold a weekly Monday market at Mattersey. He also gave permission to hold annual fairs on St John of Beverley's day (7 May) and St Simon and St Jude's day (28 October).

The priory was dissolved as part of King Henry VIII's Dissolution of the Monasteries. It was surrendered on 3 October 1538 by Robert Holgate, Bishop of Llandaff; the Prior, Thomas Norman; the sub-prior, Thomas Bell; and by the three canons: John Garton, William Schylton, and Richard Watson. The following year the former Prior was awarded an annual pension of £12 the sub-prior £2 13s. 4d., and each of the canons 40s.

In 1539, the priory and its estate were given to Anthony Nevill. Around the year 1605, Mrs Margaret Nevill wrote to Lady Ann Holles at Haughton, inviting her to come and "visit the poor old Abbey of Mattersley".

The site was taken under the guardianship of the Commissioners of Works in 1912, and is currently managed by English Heritage.

=== List of known Priors ===
- Walter, c.1247
- John, c.1303
- Thomas Norman, c.1538

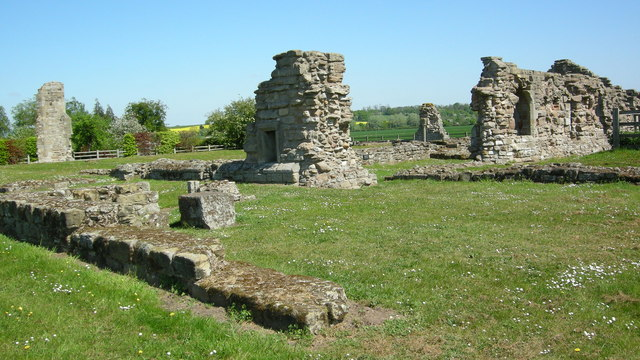
The ruins of Mattersey Priory

== Description ==
The priory church is described as "a short, narrow, rectangular, aisleless building, without transepts". To the north stood a tower which was built in the 15th century. To the south of the church was the cloisters: a covered passageway around a courtyard, which was in turn surrounded by ranges of buildings on three sides. The eastern range of the cloisters was built after the fire of 1279. The ground floor consisted of a single vaulted room. This was subdivided to form a chapel, chapter house, and a day or warming room. Above was the "dorter" or "sleeping quarters" with the reredorter (communal toilet) at the end of the building. The southern range of the cloisters was slightly larger than the east, but had two stories again: the ground floor was an under-croft whilst the upper floor was occupied by the "frater" or refectory, where the canons ate. The west range was originally the lay-brothers accommodation (refectory on the ground-floor, sleeping quarters above). However, it is thought to have been converted into accommodation for the Prior. To the South-West was a square building housing the monastic kitchens.

=== Remains ===
The ruins of the priory sit next to the River Idle, east of the village of Mattersey. The ruins consist mainly of foundations but also include the remains of the 12th-century priory church, three arches from the canon's refectory, the foundations of the 14th-century monastic kitchens and the remains of a 15th-century tower. The foundations of the monastic service buildings (barns, bakehouse, infirmary etc.) are thought to remain under the area currently occupied by the farm buildings and yards of the adjacent Abbey Farm.

In 1914, a partial excavation located the buried foundations of the cloister's east and south ranges. A small amount of restoration work was also undertaken during these excavations.
