= Harwell, Nottinghamshire =

Hamlet in Nottinghamshire, England

Coordinates: 53.417°N 0.971°W

Harwell
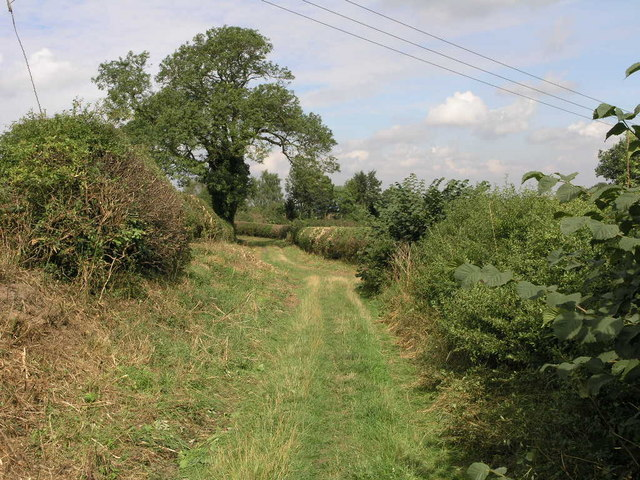
- Path to Harwell, just north of the hamlet

- Location within Nottinghamshire
- Civil parish: Everton
- District: Bassetlaw
- Shire county: Nottinghamshire
- Region: East Midlands
- Country: England
- Sovereign state: United Kingdom
- Post town: Doncaster
- Postcode district: DN10
- Police: Nottinghamshire
- Fire: Nottinghamshire
- Ambulance: East Midlands
- UK Parliament: Bassetlaw

Harwell is a hamlet in the civil parish of Everton, in Bassetlaw district, northern Nottinghamshire, England. It is located off the A631 road, less than a mile to the northwest of Everton and three miles northeast of Bawtry. Although only a small settlement, historically Harwell had a separate manor. The hamlet had a population of 112 people in the mid 19th century and the Corporation of Newark were lords of the manor at that time. Today, the main feature of Harwell is the Grade II listed Pear Tree House and the Barrow Hills woodland, immediately to the northwest.

== History ==
The etymology of the settlement is uncertain. It possibly means "the well or spring of the Danish army (here)" or "the fiercely boiling spring". "Hare spring" is also suggested as its meaning. The place was mentioned in Domesday Book as Herewelle. Selected extracts from the Domesbook mentioning Harwell are as follows:

"In Evretone and Hereuuelle of the fee of Roger de Busli in Oswardebec Wapentac, soc to Burton, there was two bov. ¾, ad Geldam. The land one car. There one sochm. had half a car. and one acre and an half of meadow, pasture wood one qu. long, one broad. And likewise in Heruuelle and Evretone sok to Grengeley three bov. 1–3rd, ad Geldam. The land one car. There one sochm. one vill. had half a car. and three acres of meadow, pasture wood five qu. long, two qu. broad.. The jury, found that John Freschevede held in the town of Herewell, one bovat of land in demesne, seven natives (or villains) holding five bov. in villenage."

Harwell and Everton were part of the Hundred of Bassetlaw (now Bassetlaw district) in the North Clay division. The parish of Everton, in which Harwell is located, was inclosed in 1760, when the Rectorial tithes were commuted for an allotment of 225 acres, of which William Walton, Esq., of Stockwith, was impropriator at the time. Charles Brewerton, a Mormon, was born here in 1831.

Although only a hamlet, historically Harwell had a separate manor. In 1855 it was reported that the hamlet had a population of 112 people and that Corporation of Newark were lords of the manor. The manor was previously owned by Thomas Magnus who bought it and gave it to Anthony Gylby who was Lieutenant Colonel to Sr John Digby in Newark.

== Geography ==
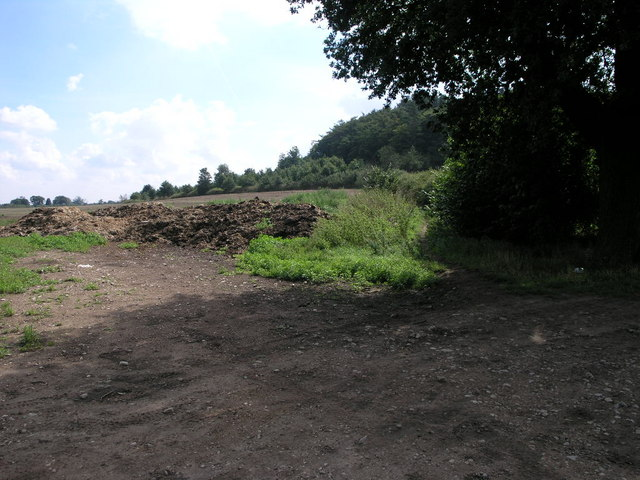
Rim of the Barrow Hills near Harwell

Harwell is located in the broad, low-lying River Idle valley of central Nottinghamshire. It is located approximately 3 miles southeast of Bawtry, 9 miles northwest of Gainsborough, Lincolnshire, 37 miles northeast of Nottingham, and 152 miles from London. The main access road to the hamlet is along Harwell Lane which approaches the hamlet from the A631 road (to Bawtry in the west) and from Everton which lies less than a mile to the southeast. The River Idle skirts the southern part of the area, and the Chesterfield Canal maizes an acute turn to the east, running along the southern verge of the River Carr to its junction with the River Trent at Stockwith. Immediately to the northwest of the hamlet are the Barrow Hills, a heavily forested woodland.

== Landmarks ==
The main feature of the hamlet is the Pear Tree House and farm. The farmhouse is dated to the 18th century and has 20th-century windows and portico with two Tuscan columns and an eight-panelled door. It is built from brick in three storeys and became a Grade II listed building on 23 November 1984.

This property is in Everton, not Harwell.

== Bibliography ==
- Curtis, John (1844). A Topographical History of Nottinghamshire.
- Throsby, John (1796). Thoroton's History of Nottinghamshire: Volume 3. Institute of Historical Research (accessed by British History Online).
