= St Peter & St Paul's Church, Gringley-on-the-Hill =

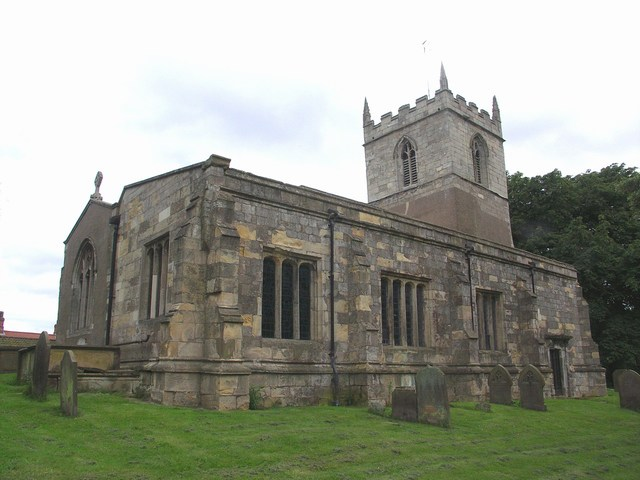
- St Peter & St Paul's Church, Gringley-on-the-Hill
- St Peter & St Paul's Church, Gringley-on-the-Hill
- 53°24′26.51″N 0°53′39.58″W
- OS grid reference: SK 73598 90666
- Location: Gringley-on-the-Hill
- Country: England
- Denomination: Church of England

History
- Dedication: St Peter and St Paul

Architecture
- Heritage designation: Grade II* listed

Administration
- Province: York
- Diocese: Diocese of Southwell and Nottingham
- Archdeaconry: Newark
- Deanery: Bassetlaw and Bawtry
- Parish: Gringley-on-the-Hill

Clergy
- Vicar: Rev J Smithurst

St Peter & St Paul's Church is a Grade II* listed parish church in the Church of England in Gringley-on-the-Hill.

== History ==
The church dates from the 13th century and has been added to or restored in every century since. The south aisle was added in 1910 - 1912 for Revd. Charles Bailey.

Since 2022, St Peter & St Paul's has belonged to the Oswaldbeck Benefice, a union of six parishes that also includes the following neighbouring churches:

- All Saints' Church, Beckingham
- St Peter's Church, Clayworth
- All Saints' Church, Misterton
- St Mary Magdalene's Church, Walkeringham
- St Mary the Virgin's Church, West Stockwith

== Organ ==
The organ is by Bevington and Sons. A specification of the organ can be found on the National Pipe Organ Register.

== See also ==
- Grade II* listed buildings in Nottinghamshire
- Listed buildings in Gringley on the Hill
