= Mattersey =

Village in Nottinghamshire, England

Coordinates: 53.40°N 0.96°W

- Village and Civil parish
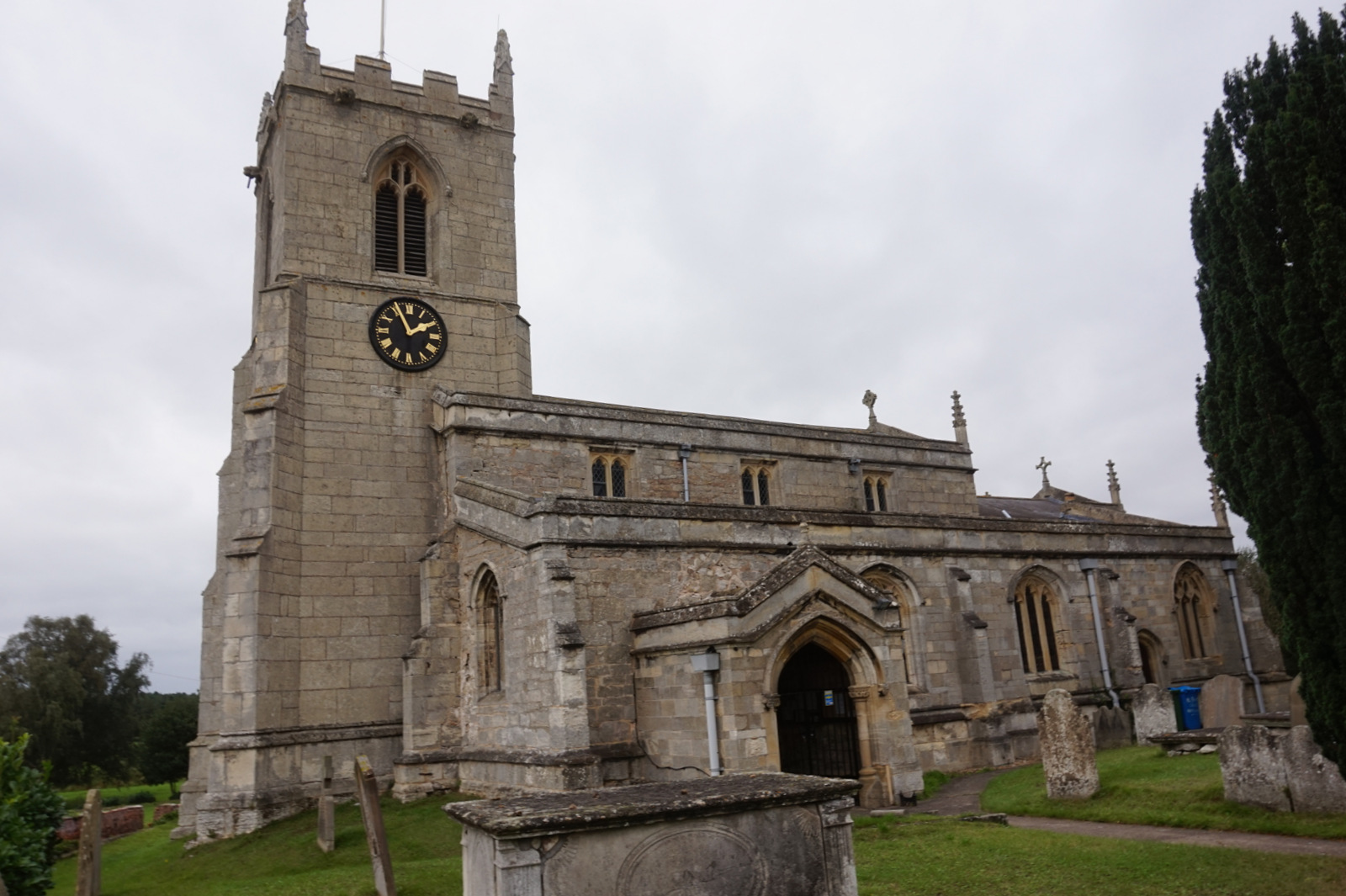
- All Saints Church

- Location within Nottinghamshire
- Interactive map of Mattersey
- Area: 3.84 sq mi (9.9 km^{2})
- Population: 725 (2021)
  - Density: 189/sq mi (73/km^{2})
- OS grid reference: SK 689893
  - London: 135 mi (217 km) SE
- District: Bassetlaw
- Shire county: Nottinghamshire
- Region: East Midlands
- Country: England
- Sovereign state: United Kingdom
- Places: Mattersey; Mattersey Thorpe
- Post town: DONCASTER
- Postcode district: DN10
- Dialling code: 01777
- Police: Nottinghamshire
- Fire: Nottinghamshire
- Ambulance: East Midlands
- UK Parliament: Bassetlaw
- Website: matterseypc.co.uk

Mattersey is a village in Nottinghamshire, England. It is located about 6 miles north of Retford. It sits close to the border of Nottinghamshire and South Yorkshire, being just under 13 miles from Doncaster. According to the 2001 census it had a population of 779, increasing to 792 at the 2011 census, and falling to 725 in 2021.

Within the parish lies the settlement of Mattersey Thorpe, originally consisting of a few farms. During World War II many poorly built bungalows were constructed. The streets thus formed were named after prominent figures of the war. (Keyes, Bloomfield, Churchill, Bader, Wavell, Cunningham etc.)

The parish church of All Saints is 14th century. About a mile to the east of the village are the remains of Mattersey Priory on a gravel island in the River Idle.

On 21 January 1999, four people died when a Tornado GR1 jet from RAF Cottesmore collided with a Cessna light aircraft above the village. The Cessna crashed into sugar-beet fields close to a school. At the same time, the Tornado continued flying over woodland spilling fuel before crashing into fields about a mile away, exploding before impact. The Tornado was on a training mission, and the Italian trainee was ejected from the aircraft on impact. Some local villagers witnessed the parachute descending but he did not survive the impact of the two aircraft.

== See also ==
- Listed buildings in Mattersey
