= Everton, Nottinghamshire =

Village and civil parish in Nottinghamshire, England

Coordinates: 53.414°N 0.957°W

Everton
- Village and Civil parish
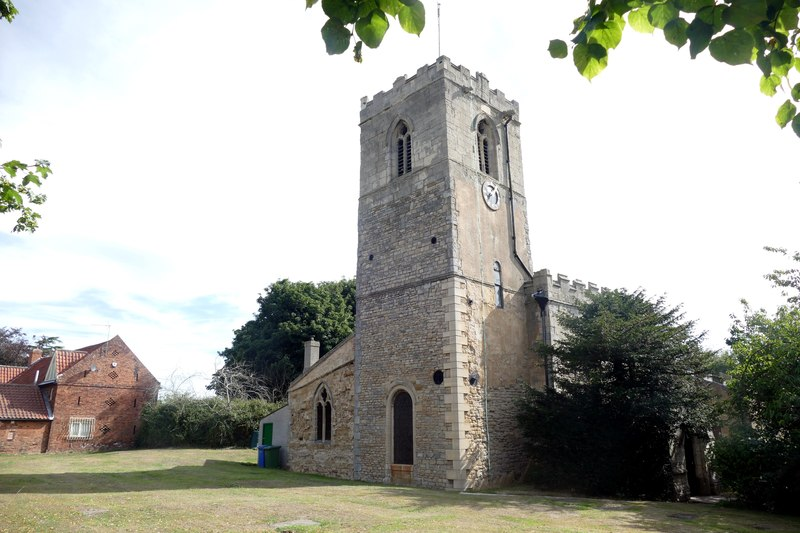
- Holy Trinity Church

- Location within Nottinghamshire
- Interactive map of Everton
- Area: 5.95 sq mi (15.4 km^{2})
- Population: 902 (2021)
  - Density: 152/sq mi (59/km^{2})
- OS grid reference: SK6941791292
  - London: 130 mi (210 km) SE
- District: Bassetlaw
- Shire county: Nottinghamshire
- Region: East Midlands
- Country: England
- Sovereign state: United Kingdom
- Places: Everton; Harwell
- Post town: DONCASTER
- Postcode district: DN10
- Dialling code: 01777
- Police: Nottinghamshire
- Fire: Nottinghamshire
- Ambulance: East Midlands
- UK Parliament: Bassetlaw
- Website: evertonparishcouncil.uk

Everton is a village and civil parish in Nottinghamshire, England. Located on the A631 between Gainsborough and Bawtry, it is part of Bassetlaw district. The parish includes the village of Harwell. The population of the civil parish at the 2011 census was 839, and this increased to 902 in 2021. There are 23 grade II listed buildings in the village. The village is recorded in the Domesday Book of 1086–7 as Evretone. Everton was originally a Danish settlement by the name of Eofor-tun. For the majority of its history Everton's inhabitants have been farmers. Everton is twinned with the French village of Bouy in Champagne Ardenne, France.

== History ==
=== Everton Mill ===
Everton Mill was a four-storey brick tower windmill built c. 1820. It was sold along with a watermill to farmer James Taylor by Will Templence in 1848. The sails were removed in 1930, the mill being worked by steam engines installed in 1898 in a nearby engine house. The mill was still working in the 1940s but was closed c. 1950 and the machinery dismantled. The mill tower is still standing.

=== Holy Trinity ===
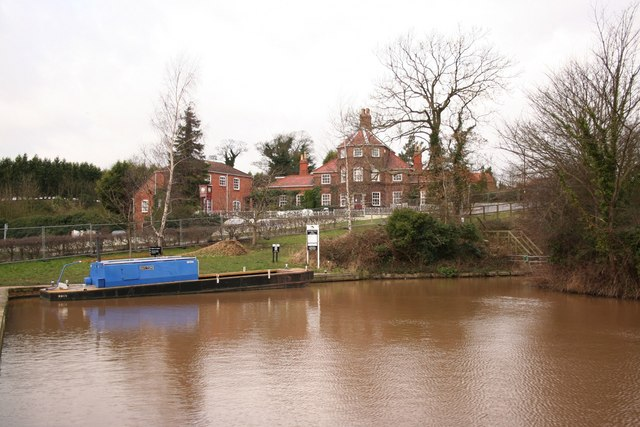
The White Swan, Drakeholes moorings

Holy Trinity Church, Everton was built shortly after the Norman conquest in 1066. The church went through several changes, the first being between 1150–1180 A.D., and was due to the increase in the number of worshippers. In later years gargoyles were added.

=== Anthony Gilby ===
Anthony Gilby was an MP for Kingston upon Hull from 1661 to circa 1675. He came from a lower upper class Lincolnshire family. He became wealthy after marrying a Nottinghamshire heiress. An active royalist, he joined the Newark garrison under Lord Belasyse until the signing of the articles of surrender in 1646. In 1650 he was fined £25 for being, according to the local major-general, ' a dangerous enemy '. For his collaboration in a projected rising in 1655 Anthony found himself imprisoned. By 1675 Anthony had helped pass several acts of Parliament. He also received the government whip. Proximally four years later he offered his services to Hull for the coming parliament, but was turned down due to the discovery that he had embezzled £650 worth of lead and 12,000 bricks, belonging to the Hull garrison. He escaped being proceeded against, 'in consideration of his loyal and eminent services'. He was buried at Everton on 27 April 1682.

== Site of Special Scientific Interest ==
Everton has an Site of Special Scientific Interest, that is 2 hectares. The soil is a mixture of glacial sand with clay nodules. The developing tree layer contains trees such as oak sycamore and maple. The shrub layer includes gorse, buckthorn, privet and bramble. The ground layer has vipers bugloss, basil, thyme and thyme leaved sandwort amongst other plants.

== See also ==
- Listed buildings in Everton, Nottinghamshire
