= Scofton =

Hamlet in Nottinghamshire, England

Coordinates: 53.317°N 1.055°W

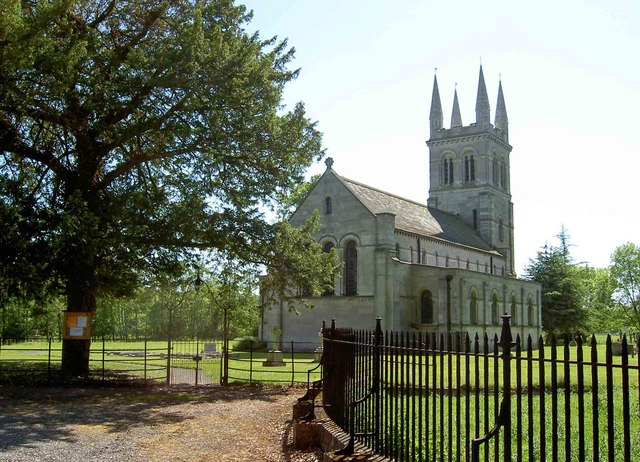
- St John the Evangelist church at Scofton

- Location within Nottinghamshire
- Interactive map of Scofton
- OS grid reference: SK 62997 80488
- District: Bassetlaw
- Shire county: Nottinghamshire
- Region: East Midlands
- Country: England
- Sovereign state: United Kingdom
- Post town: WORKSOP
- Postcode district: S81
- Police: Nottinghamshire
- Fire: Nottinghamshire
- Ambulance: East Midlands
- UK Parliament: Bassetlaw

Scofton is a hamlet in the Bassetlaw district of northern Nottinghamshire, England. It is 130 miles (210 km) north west of London, 25 miles (40 km) north of the county town and city of Nottingham, and 3 miles (4.8 km) east of the nearest town Worksop. Having a shared modern history with nearby Osberton Hall, it is sometimes referred to as Scofton-with-Osberton. Other close neighbours are Bilby and Rayton which also have historical associations.

== Toponymy ==
Scofton was recorded in the Domesday Book of 1086 as Scotebi, of Norse origin, possibly meaning 'Skopti 's farm'. The Old English form is Skofton, as recorded in county assize records of 1280, eventually becoming its modern form from 1316 onwards.

Osberton was also listed in Domesday, and is believed to mean 'the farmstead of Osbeorn'.

Bilby was Bilebi in Domesday and was a named for a person, Bil.

Rayton was at the time of Domesday, Rolvetune and Rouuetone, which may have meant 'reeve farm', or was possibly a derivative of the nearby river.

== Geography ==
Scofton is surrounded by the following local areas:

- Bilby and Blyth to the north
- Osberton to the south
- Ranby to the east
- Rayton and Worksop to the west.

This area lies in the south west within Bassetlaw district and north west in Nottinghamshire county. The core of the hamlet is accessed from the B6079 Worksop-Ranby road. Surrounding the settlement is predominantly a farming area, interspersed by farms, occasional residential dwellings and some small forested areas. Scofton stands on the north bank of the River Ryton, with the Chesterfield Canal also nearby. The lands of Osberton lie to the south. The wider area is low-lying, at a land elevation of 25–40 metres (82–131 ft), with a peak by northern Rayton of 60–70 metres (200–230 ft).

== Governance ==
The area, except Bilby is not parished, being previously in the Municipal Borough of Worksop until 1974.

Bassetlaw District Council manage the lowest levels of public duties in the settlements.

Nottinghamshire County Council provides the highest level strategic services locally.

== History ==
=== Scofton ===
By the time of Domesday in 1086, Scofton was in the ownership of William the Conqueror, and Osberton was held by Swein / Wulfgeat of Madeley.

Scofton then was part of the wider manor of Mansfield also held by the King.

By the late-16th century, the Jessop family (from Broomhall, Sheffield) were owners of Scofton Hall which was a manor house. Scofton then passed to the Banks family (also of Sheffield) in the late-17th /early-18th century – Joseph Banks, MP at one stage for Grimsby, was recorded as residing at Scofton in 1702. Scofton was sold to Brigadier General Richard Sutton in 1727. The last member of this family residing at the hall was Robert Sutton who was responsible for having the walled kitchen garden built in the late 18th century. The estate was sold around the start of the 19th century to Francis.F. Foljambe, who by this time held nearby Osberton Hall through marriage. Soon after this Scofton Hall was demolished and the landscape cleared to allow a more open view from Osberton Hall.

The church of St John the Evangelist was built in 1833 on top of, or close to the site of the hall, as a private chapel to Osberton Hall.

=== Osberton ===
At the time of Domesday survey, this was listed as containing two manors and a church. Robert Fitz Ranulph was a local lord in the 12th century and offered Osberton church to Worksop Priory, with his descendants confirming the gift. The church had been run down by 1227, when an assessment of it was done by Archbishop Gray, ruling it to be deconsecrated into a place to support the local poor. Sir Thomas Chaworth, a 15th-century landowner, granted further land to the priory. The Bolles family, after the Dissolution of the Monasteries took ownership of the area. Several of the family were subsequently born here, with a form of residence in use by this period. One of the more notable descendants was Dame Mary Bolles, who in 1635 was created a Baronetess by King Charles I, a title usually granted to men in the period.

The estate through marriage eventually passed to William Leek of Halam in the 1660s. Leek exchanged Osberton with John Thornagh (of Fenton) in 1682 and Osberton became a winter residence. Osberton stayed with the family into the 18th century, and it's possible the manor developed into a hall of some form by this time, possibly as a result of expansion of this house. There was also a mill in the location. John Thornagh, grandson of the aforementioned John, in 1744 married Arabella Savile (daughter of Sir George Savile, 7th Baronet of Rufford Abbey). John succeeded to the estates of his godfather, Sir Thomas Hewett (of Shireoaks Hall) in 1756, and used his surname from there on.

Osberton Hall had reconstruction work at this time, the core fabric of the building dating to the mid-18th century. In the mid-1770s, building began on the Chesterfield Canal, following the course of the River Ryton through the estate. The canal opened in 1777, with the main access over the canal by means of a bridge close to Osberton Hall. At John Thornhagh-Hewett's death in 1787, Osberton, and his other estates passed to his daughter, Mary Arabella, who had married in 1774 Francis Ferrand Foljambe. In 1798 Fojambe purchased Scofton Hall from the Sutton family, along with the adjacent Rayton area, and soon afterwards, the nearby Bilby estate from the Vane family.

=== Bilby ===
Bilby was recorded at the time of Domesday. Bilby Hall was a manor house located close to the River Ryton, located between the estates of Osberton & Scofton (to the south west), Hodsock (to the west), Ranby (to the east) and Blyth (to the north), within a detached portion of Barnby Moor parish. It was built possibly around the 16th/17th century. The estate was purchased by Morgan Vane in 1748 from William Levinz (of Grove Hall). It was later sold in 1801 to Francis Ferrand Foljambe.

=== Rayton ===
The Domesday survey listed that before the conquest in 1066 there were two manors here, respectively held by Vlsi and Archil. A part of the area later was belonging to the King’s manor of Mansfield. Later history was poorly documented. In the latter 1500s and 1600s Rayton was the residence and the property of the Eyre family, of which some of their relations held Grove Hall and its manor. There was also an ancient hall which stood in a much lower location near the river, but nothing of this remains. The manor eventually became united with the Scofton estate which was then sold to Francis Foljambe.A farmhouse, together with two or three cottages, form the hamlet. Thievesdale Lane marked the upper extent of this area.

=== Merged estate ===
From 1801 after the expansion of the local land holdings of the Osberton manor from the addition of Scofton, Rayton and Bilby, various landscaping efforts were done, with the demolition of the Scofton Hall, clearing of trees in the vicinity to open up views, and the expansion of the lake and other water features. Osberton Hall also had a makeover in 1806, and Foljambe lived at Bilby Hall temporarily while works were ongoing. Bilby Hall was later used by Foljambe family relations as a residence. Other work included the rebuilding of stables and adding lodges in the period 1826-1835 to the newly private roads created after the Worksop-Retford turnpike road was diverted away from the hall in 1822. In the midst of the work, a pot of 4th century Roman coins was found adjacent to the road. Before the middle 1800s, an estate village at Scofton was established, including workers cottages, a keepers cottage, a school and a large stable range. A ornithology museum was also housed within the house by this time.

The estate farms were noted throughout the later part of the 19th century for its Osberton Shorthorns cows, with much of the farmland around. the parkland used for grazing. In 1896, a replacement school was built at Scofton, on former paddocks. The site was used until 1949 and has since been converted into the village hall. By the 20th century Bilby Hall had been partially torn down and the remainder converted into cottages. Bilby Hall surroundings were later converted to kennels, and demolished mid-20th century, with just a woodland area, pair of cottages, section of lawn and former lake in place. Osberton Hall and the immediate grounds were sold by the Foljambe family in 1987, although the wider area, including Scofton village and Bilby, still form part of the Foljambe family estate.

=== RAF Worksop ===
In 1942, the UK Government requisitioned much of the estate grounds for use by the Royal Air Force during World War II. An airfield, RAF Worksop, intended as a satellite of RAF Finningley (along with another site around 11 km to the north, RAF Bircotes), was constructed on the northern edge of the park and was in use by 1943. Its function was primarily for training, particularly for night flying. Roads around the airstrips were diverted and upgraded for access, and features of the landscape such as wooded plantations were removed. The use as an airfield continued until 1958, when operations were halted. The site was officially decommissioned in 1960, with most of the airfield infrastructure removed except for some sections of runway.

== Culture and community ==
=== Village hall, Scofton ===
This was originally a school for children of the estate workers, this was built as a replacement for an earlier school constructed during the establishment of the estate village in the 1820-1830s. It remained in this use until 1949, from when it was changed into use as a community hall.

=== Osberton horse trials ===
This is an annual equestrian event, held usually in September or October. It was begun in 1970 by George Michael Foljambe, continued by descendents and maintains the family interest in horses. Competitions include show jumping, dressage, shire horse display and classes. It is accessed by means of the A1 road.

== Landmarks ==
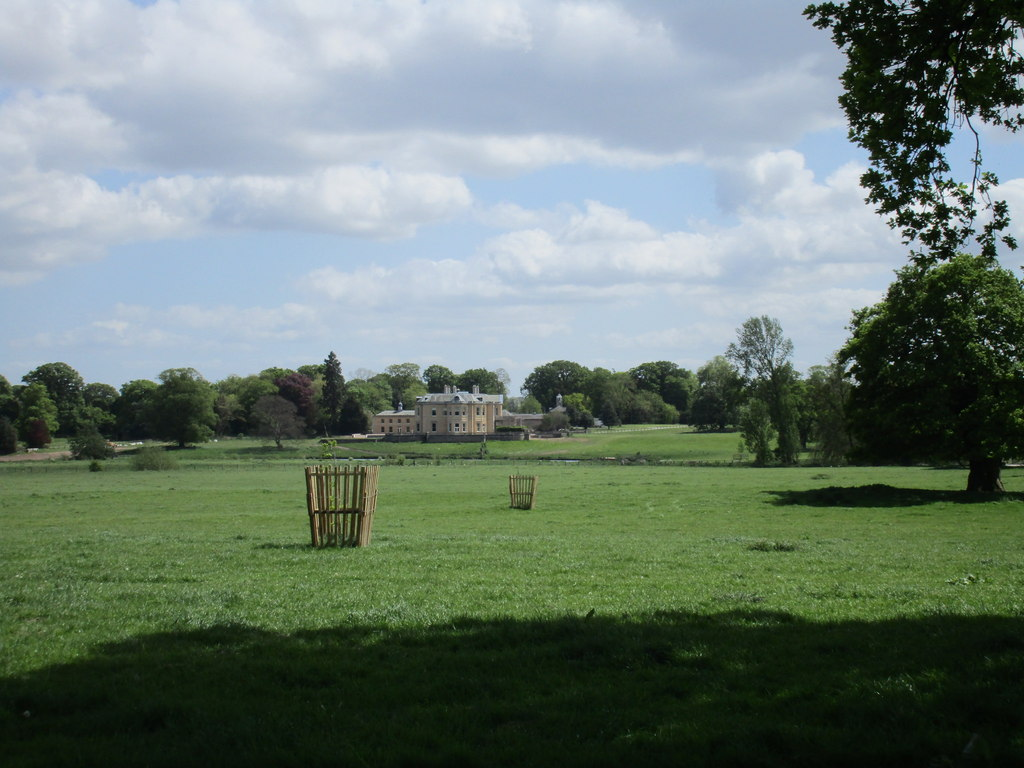
Osberton Hall and park

=== Chesterfield Canal/Cuckoo Way ===
The section of canal in the area was built in 1774, the overall aim primarily to move minerals such as coal and lead. The canal was in full use by 1777. Later developments with railway and road transport eventually caused the canal to become little used by the 1960s. From that period efforts were made to restore the remaining lengths by the village, and is presently available for leisure purposes. Several locks run through the portion of the area. The long distance Cuckoo Way path reuses the towpath of the canal.

=== Listed buildings ===
Several items of architectural interest are registered as listed throughout the local area at mainly Grade II, including:

Osberton

- Osberton Hall (Grade II*)
- Dower House
- Brewery and water towers
- Stables
- Summer house on an island in a nearby lake

Scofton

- Church of St John

Bilby

- Bilby farmhouse

== Religious sites ==
=== St John the Evangelist, Scofton ===
In memory of his first wife who died in 1830 during birth of their child, George Savile Foljambe built a church, just across the lake by Osberton, on the previous site of Scofton Hall, which had been pulled down in around 1800, and of which a small portion of its offices remained until then. This church was consecrated by the Archbishop of York in 1833. It was a private chapel until 1876 when it became part of a separate ecclesiastical parish, the boundary of which coincided with the Osberton estate. It was restored in the 1970s, and is used for worship into present times.
