= Shireoaks Hall =

Listed building in Nottinghamshire, England

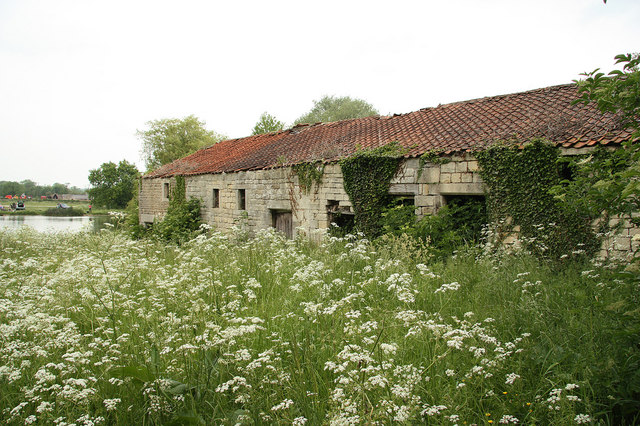
- Shireoaks Hall Stables
- Interactive map of the Shireoaks Hall area

General information
- Type: Country house
- Location: Thorpe Lane, Shireoaks, Nottinghamshire, England
- Coordinates: 53°19′10″N 1°10′20″W
- Construction started: 1612
- Completed: 1617

Design and construction
- Architect: John Smythson

Listed Building – Grade II*
- Official name: Shireoaks Hall
- Designated: 1 January 1986
- Reference no.: 1000367

Shireoaks Hall is a Grade II* listed 17th-century country house in the hamlet of Shireoaks, 2 1/4 miles (3.6 km) north-west of Worksop, Nottinghamshire, England.

The modestly sized house was originally built for Thomas Hewett, probably by John Smythson (son of Robert Smythson), between 1612 and 1617. It was remodelled around 1700 and further restored in 1812 and again after 1975. It is built of coarse square rubble with a slate roof and stands in a rectangular 40-acre (16 ha), formerly open parkland with avenues of trees, fishponds and a deerpark, which is now enclosed as farmland.

The 17th and 18th-century landscaped park that surrounds the hall is Grade II* listed on the Register of Historic Parks and Gardens.

== History ==
=== The estate acquired ===
The manor of Shireoaks was given to the Priory of Worksop by Emma de Lovetot, whose husband William de Lovetot founded the priory in 1105. The Prior and convent leased the grange to Henry Ellis and his wife Dame Luce in 1458. In August 1546, following the Dissolution of the Monasteries by King Henry VIII, the manor, lordship or grange, with appurtenances in Sherockes, Gytford and Derfold (Darfoulds), was granted to Robert and Hugh Thornhill of Walkeringham with licence to alienate it to Thomas Hewett, Clothworker of London. At about the same time, Thomas Hewett had acquired the (already plundered) house and lands of Roche Abbey at Maltby, South Yorkshire (about 7 miles (11 km) north of Shireoaks), from which he could have recovered building stone. He kept Roche for 18 years until granted licence to alienate it to Richard Hunt of Manchester in January 1563/64.

The brothers William and Thomas Hewett were born in the hamlet of Wales, in Laughton-en-le-Morthen, South Yorkshire, the sons of Edmund Hewett. Around 1530 both became free of the newly chartered Company of Clothworkers in the city of London. William Hewett the Master of that Company in 1543–1544 (after he had purchased Harthill, and shortly before Thomas purchased Roche and Shireoaks), was Sheriff of London (with Thomas Offley) for 1553–1554 (Queen Mary's first year), and was elected Lord Mayor of London in 1559 (as Elizabeth I's reign was beginning). Sir William died in 1567, making his only daughter (Anne, wife of Sir Edward Osborne) heir to his lands at Wales and Harthill, which became the core of the Kiveton Park estate of their descendants, the Dukes of Leeds.

Shireoaks manor had a special association with the ancient oak woodlands (part of Sherwood) which grew where the counties of Yorkshire, Nottinghamshire and Derbyshire met: the precise location was debated, but one enormous tree standing in the 18th century was said to overhang all three. In 1576 Thomas Hewett, who became a very prosperous London merchant, died leaving Shireoaks manor to his son Henry, also a citizen Clothworker. Henry's brother William had received the parsonage of Dunton Bassett in Leicestershire, and lands at Mansfield, from his uncle: distinct branches of the family evolved. Henry died in 1598, leaving his "Manour, Lordshippe or Grange of Sherookes" to his eldest son and heir (Sir) Thomas Hewett. The "Grange" refers to the monastic manorial farmstead.

=== The first hall ===
The construction of Shireoaks Hall as a more imposing residence on this site is credited to this Sir Thomas, grandson of the Clothworker Thomas. Before 1619 he conveyed the manor to William Wrottesley, presumably as a marital endowment. The design of the building is attributed to the architect John Smythson, son of Robert Smythson, and the date of the work probably between 1612 and 1617. Old heraldic arms were restored to Sir Thomas in 1618 by Richard St George.

This was a substantial but compact rectangular structure built of Magnesian Limestone, its principal frontages facing south-west, to a prospect of the park and estates, and north-east overlooking a large enclosed rectangular terrace garden on the same lateral alignment, with the course of the river Ryton just beyond. Across the upper terrace next to the house a path aligned on the central axis of the house leads down a flight of steps to the main broad terrace, across this and beyond, to two further flights leading to narrower lower terraces towards the river. The hall stands midway along the south-western edge of this garden, the perimeter walls enclosing a considerable area of land thought to have been laid out thus in the original phase of construction.

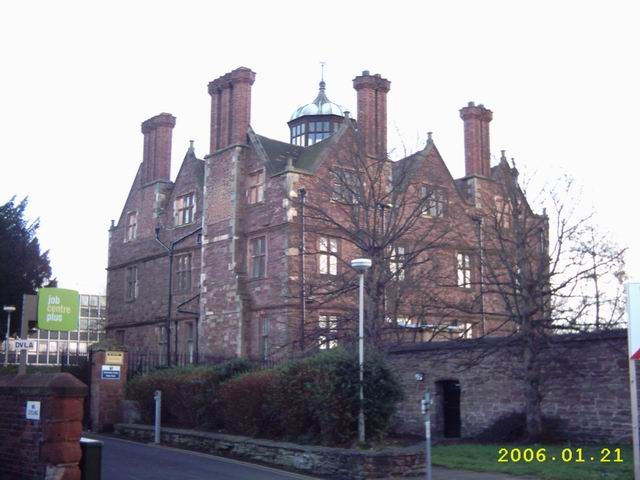
The Tudor mansion of Whitehall, Thomas Hewett's childhood home in Abbey Foregate, Shrewsbury

The Sir Thomas Hewett, for whom this hall was built, resided at Shireoaks and became Sheriff of Nottinghamshire for 1627. He lived long, through the English Civil War and the Commonwealth of England, and to see his son William Hewett married and the birth of a grandson Thomas Hewett in around 1656. However William died at about the same time as his father (which was in 1660–1661), and so the infant Thomas at four years of age became the heir to Shireoaks. He was taken to Shrewsbury (where his grandfather Sir Richard Prynce the younger (1598–1665) was yet living, at Whitehall mansion) for education, and during his minority the hall was occupied by the Earle family of Rampton. Having matriculated at the University of Oxford in 1676, in 1677 he leased the hall for seven years to William and Richard Sanderson of Godford.

=== Development: park and water-gardens ===
This younger (Sir) Thomas Hewett, having completed his studies at Oxford, a term of service in the Yeomen of the Guard to Charles II, and some four or five years of travel in Europe, in 1689 married in Geneva and brought his young wife Frances home to Shireoaks. Thomas settled the manor and premises in Shireoaks upon his marriage, by lease and release to Sir Edward Betenson, 2nd Bart., in 1692. He became a noted royal servant and official, Surveyor-General of Woods in 1701 and 1714 and Surveyor of the King's Works from 1719 until his death in 1726. Privately he made extensive alterations and improvements to his house and park at Shireoaks. His wife was a friend and correspondent of the young Lady Mary Wortley Montagu.

In addition to the alterations of c. 1700 to the main house at Shireoaks, various built developments around the hall were carried out. A matching pair of two-storey rectangular outbuildings with steeply pitched hipped roofs, now called the East and West Stables (but with domestic fenestration), were built at the north approach to the hall, the space between them forming an entrance way. Two pools were developed to the north-east of these, enclosing the north-west boundary of the terraced garden. A canal pool, called the "Fountain Pool", was created below the north-east side of the terraces, 127 metres (417 ft) long and 21 metres (69 ft) wide, with a semicircular extension at the centre of the farther side (corresponding to the house axis), presumably the position of a fountain.

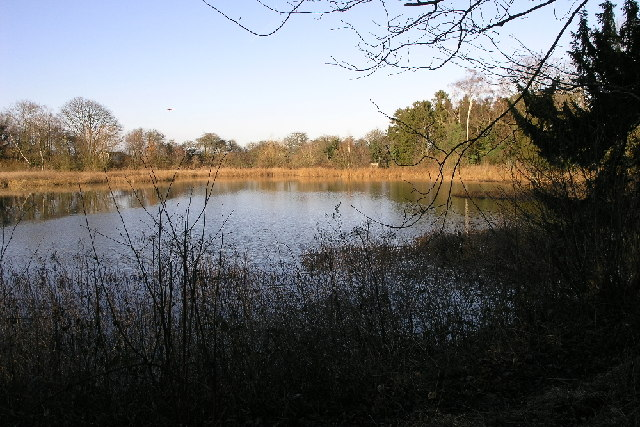
The basin pool to feed the cascades

The canal garden

The main extent of the park (now mostly agricultural land) lay south-west of the hall, between Thorpe Lane to the north, Spring Lane to the east, Steetley Lane to the south and Dumb Hall Lane and Netherhall Lane in the west. Through this landscape Sir Thomas Hewett laid out a formal prospect. A great lawn extended from the south front of the hall, ending in a ha-ha to exclude livestock from the park without interrupting the view. Beyond this, in line with the central (front-to-back) axis of the hall itself, he built a garden canal 250 metres (820 ft) long. This was fed from a circular basin 122 metres (400 ft) in diameter situated (on the same line) in a woodland plantation 880 metres (2,890 ft) from the hall, itself fed by a 400-metre (1,300 ft) culvert from Netherhall. Between the basin and the farther end of the canal was created an artificial system of 34 cascades falling through 12 separate pools. Over all this distance was a pathway along the south side and a sheltering line of yew trees interspersed with a single linden tree after every third yew.

The avenues and pavilion

Two long straight avenues of beech trees were planted on lines opening away symmetrically from the hall and diverging from the canal as their median axis, so as to frame the Vista (the arrangement called a "patte d'oie"). A third avenue crossed between the further ends, and the woodlands to the north of the basin (Shireoaks Park Wood) and those to the south-west of it (Scratta Wood) formed the distant backdrop to the scene. In Scratta Wood Sir Thomas built a pavilion or banqueting house in Italian style. It was a rectangular structure with flights of steps to entrances at each end. Inside were three rooms with marble walls and floors, each differently appointed with pilasters according to the three classical orders, and with "little Cupids on several Angles prettily design'd". The ceilings were painted by Henry Trench (an Irish historical painter who studied in Italy and died in 1726), and the building housed a bust of Sir Thomas Hewett by John Michael Rysbrack. Hewett's banqueting house no longer exists.

Completion

Hewett also formed or enlarged the deer-park. The works were not entirely complete at his death in 1726: "Whereas I have begun the building of the house in the wood called Scratoe and also have designed to make severall Cutts and other ornaments in and about the said Wood according to a draught and design I have made and drawn thereof", he therefore empowered his trustees to complete the work. He made his widow's lifetime tenure of the hall dependent (among other responsibilities) upon her maintaining there a herd of 200 deer. He asked to be buried in the chancel of the church at Wales, Yorkshire, where he has a monument with an informative inscription.

His widow went to live in London where she died in 1756 aged 88, but she was buried beside her husband in the church at Wales. She is said to have retained her beauty and accomplishments into old age. Her will details her collections of paintings and her tea-sets of blue-and-white and red-and white china. John Hallam, who under Sir Thomas Hewett's regime as Surveyor-General of the King's Works had been Secretary to the Board, and Clerk of Works at Whitehall, Westminster and St James's, shared Hewett's enthusiasm for hydrostatics and designed and built a Bathhouse-Summerhouse for Sir George Savile, 7th Baronet, at Rufford Abbey in 1730.

=== John Thornhagh Hewett ===
By Sir Thomas's will his estates including Shireoaks, having been held by his wife, in 1744 came under the administration of his godson John Thornhaugh of Osberton Hall (near Worksop), grandson of John Thornhagh, M.P. and Elizabeth Earle of Stragglethorpe, and son of Saint-Andrew Thornhagh, who was executor to the will but had died in 1742. Sir Thomas is said to have dispossessed his own daughter because she had formed a liaison with a fortune-teller. The will named John Thornhaugh as residuary legatee, upon condition that he adopt the surname of Hewett (which he did in 1756). John studied at Queens' College in the University of Cambridge, where he was admitted Fellow commoner in 1739. In that year 1744 he married Arabella (daughter of Sir George Savile, 7th Baronet), who died in 1767: their only surviving daughter Mary Arabella married Francis Ferrand Foljambe of Aldwarke in 1774.

John Thornhaugh Hewett, M.P. for Nottinghamshire from 1747 to 1774, was also the owner of Osberton Hall, Bassetlaw Wapentake, which had passed to his family in the late 17th century and was let to other residents. He is thought to have been responsible for reshaping the central block of that hall, with its original full-height porch and colonnaded pediment: a private Museum was developed there. Through his kinship with the Foljambes and Saviles at Scofton Hall, part of John's extensive correspondence survives. John Hewett was a Fellow of the Society of Antiquaries of London by 1771, and received antiquary visitors at Shireoaks during the 1770s. He had his own collections of books and pictures, and a cabinet of foreign medals and coins is particularly mentioned in his will. He died in 1787 without male issue. His wife of his late years (after 1783), John Norris Hewett, survived him and died in Richmond, Surrey in 1790. John (Thornhaugh) Hewett and Arabella are buried at Sturton le Steeple, Nottinghamshire, where both have memorial inscriptions.

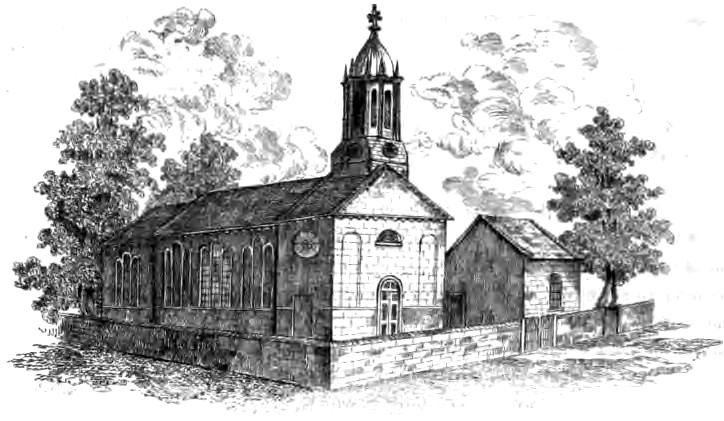
The Revd. John Hewett's chapel at Shireoaks built in 1809. The building is now the village hall.

=== Revd. John Hewett ===
With John Hewett's death in 1787, Shireoaks and other properties passed (under Sir Thomas Hewett's will) to the Revd. John Hewett (1722–1811), as the male heir of his father Revd. John Hewett of Harthill (c. 1690–1757). The Duke of Leeds, as lay patron of the church of Harthill (closely in the sphere of Kiveton and Wales), had granted that benefice to his grandfather (John, c. 1664–1715) in 1695, to which his father followed in 1715 and the younger John in 1757. He came to the estate of Shireoaks at the age of 65 and enjoyed it for more than 20 years. He built a chapel of ease attached to the estate in 1809: "a neat stone edifice, consisting of a nave and chancel, with an octangular tower surmounted by a cupola." This structure, minus the tower, is now the Shireoaks village hall.

=== Decline ===
In 1810 the Revd. John made a deed of gift of the hall and estate to his relative John Wheatley, reserving his own lifetime occupancy. Wheatley instantly (the same day) re-sold it to Vincent Eyre, agent for Charles Howard, 11th Duke of Norfolk, seated at Worksop. The new owner soon began to cut down the beech avenues, greatly to the Revd. Hewett's mortification, and while he was unable to prevent what had been done he showed in law that the timber was not contained in the sale, and obliged the owner to pay for it. On his last excursion from the hall the old man's carriage was actually obstructed from passing by the felled trees lying across the way. The shock of this devastation brought on his death (aged 89) in 1811. He is said to be buried in his chapel.

The death of the Revd. Hewett was the signal for the hall itself to be torn down except for that portion of the walls which were bought for a small sum by Mr Froggett, of Sheffield, and fitted up as a dwelling. The Duke's descendants sold it in 1842, together with their Manor of Worksop, to the then Duke of Newcastle. In 1854 the latter Duke's successor discovered a valuable coal seam beneath the land, in time sold much of it to the Shireoaks Colliery Company, and in 1863 built a church for the growing colliery village.

In 1945 the hall, by now somewhat dilapidated, was sold to a local farmer. The house and the water gardens have been separately owned since the 1970s.

== See also ==
- Grade II* listed buildings in Nottinghamshire
- Listed buildings in Shireoaks
