= Francis Ferrand Foljambe =

British politician

Francis Ferrand Foljambe (1749–1814) was a British landowner and M.P.

Born on 17 January 1749 in Aldwark, North Yorkshire, England as Francis Ferrand Moore, Foljambe changed it in 1776 as part of inheriting estates at Wadworth, Steeton, Westow, and Aldwarke, Rotherham, Yorkshire, England. His family later moved to Osberton Hall, Scofton, Worksop.

During his minority William Mason the poet was his guardian.

He was elected M.P. for Yorkshire in a by-election in January 1784 (only 2 months prior to the general election of 1784), High Sheriff of Yorkshire for 1787–88, and M.P. for Higham Ferrers, Northamptonshire in 1801, sitting until 1807.

Foljambe first married Mary Arabella (1749–1790), second daughter (and later sole heiress) of John Thornhagh of Osberton and Sturton, Nottinghamshire and Arabella Savile. (John took the name of Hewet on succeeding to the estates of his godfather, Sir Thomas Hewet, of Shireoaks Hall, Nottinghamshire.) His second wife was Lady Mary Arabella Lumley, daughter of Richard, 4th Earl of Scarborough and Barbara, younger daughter and co-heiress of Sir George Savile, last Baronet of Rufford.

He died 13 November 1814. He was succeeded by his son George, who adopted the additional surname of Savile. From then until the present century, the Lords of the Manor have carried the hyphenated name of Savile-Foljambe.
