= RAF Misson =

Former RAF station in Nottinghamshire, England

- near Finningley, South Yorkshire, England

Site information
- Type: Missile site
- Controlled by: United Kingdom
- Open to the public: No

Location
- RAF Misson within Nottingham
- Coordinates: 53.470°N 0.941°W

Site history
- Built: 1959
- In use: 1960–1963

The site of the former RAF Misson, Nottinghamshire, is located 7.5 miles (12.1 km) south-east of Doncaster, South Yorkshire, and approximately 1 mile (1.6 km) south-east of the former RAF Finningley airfield.

== History ==
The site was used as a bombing range by the Operational Training Units (OTUs) of RAF Finningley until 1948. Between October 1960 and June 1963, No 94 (Surface to Air Missile) Squadron (No 94 (SAM) Sqn) RAF operated on the site with Bristol Bloodhound I missiles under the control of the Tactical Command Centre at RAF Lindholme.

== Current use ==
The site is now private property but the concrete stands are still visible from the area. L. Jackson & Co.Ltd is situated on the site and supplies surplus military vehicles and equipment. The former site is proposed as a fracking location for the extraction of natural gas.

== See also ==
- List of former Royal Air Force stations
