= Shireoaks =

Village and civil parish in Nottinghamshire, England

Coordinates: 53.325°N 1.168°W

- Village and civil parish
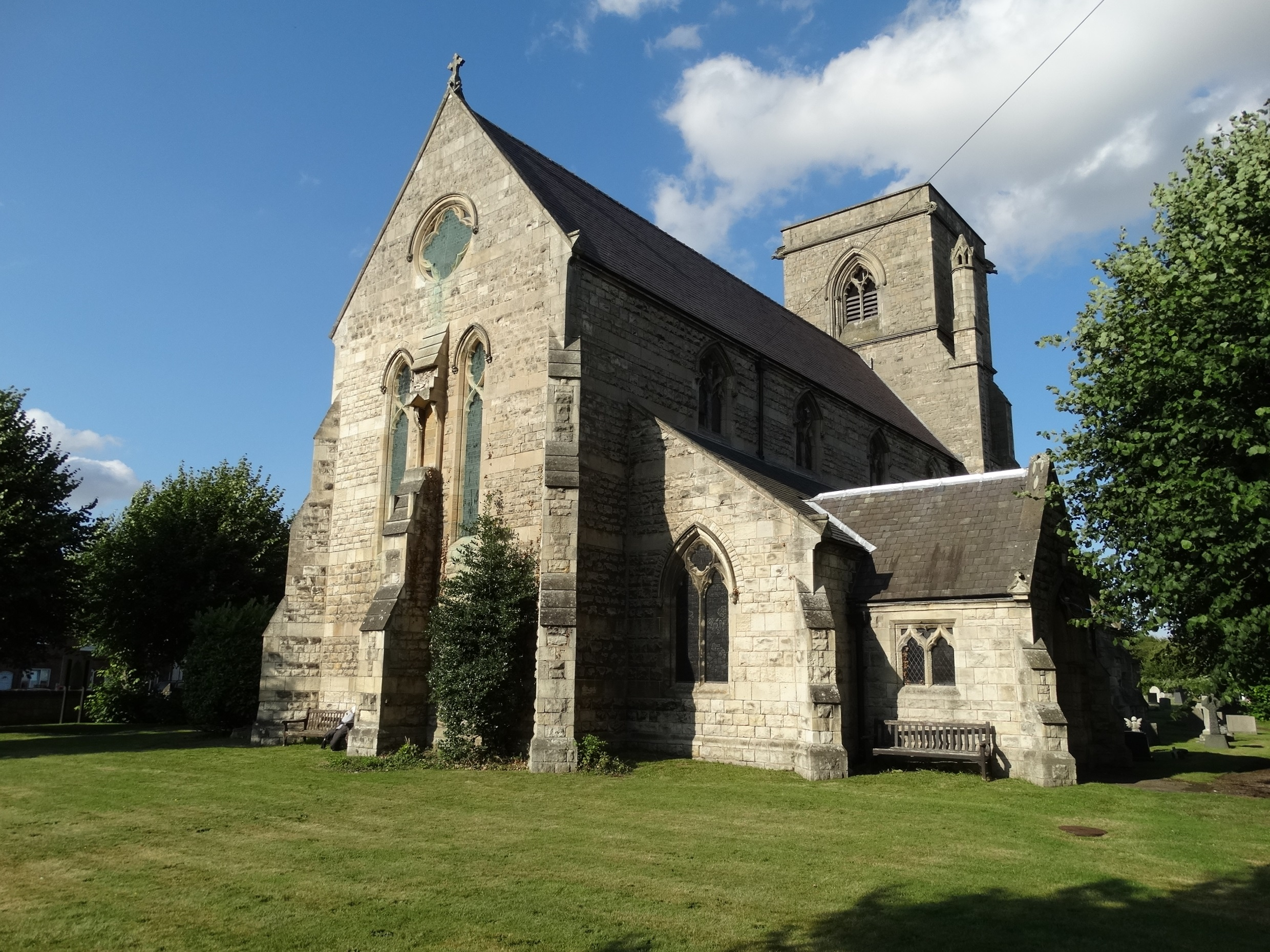
- St Luke's Church

- Location within Nottinghamshire
- Interactive map of Shireoaks
- Area: 1.92 sq mi (5.0 km^{2})
- Population: 1,774 (2021)
  - Density: 924/sq mi (357/km^{2})
- OS grid reference: SK 555811
  - London: 130 mi (210 km) SSE
- District: Bassetlaw
- Shire county: Nottinghamshire
- Region: East Midlands
- Country: England
- Sovereign state: United Kingdom
- Post town: WORKSOP
- Postcode district: S81
- Dialling code: 01909
- Police: Nottinghamshire
- Fire: Nottinghamshire
- Ambulance: East Midlands
- UK Parliament: Bassetlaw
- Website: www.hugofox.com/community/shireoaks-parish-council-10637

Shireoaks is a village and civil parish in Nottinghamshire, located between Worksop and Thorpe Salvin on the border with South Yorkshire and Derbyshire. The population of the civil parish was 1,432 at the 2011 census, which increased to 1,774 in the 2021 census.

The Chesterfield Canal and River Ryton both run through the village. The A57 between Sheffield and Worksop passes close to the village and there are rail services to Sheffield, Lincoln and Cleethorpes on the Sheffield to Lincoln Line, which has a station at Shireoaks railway station.

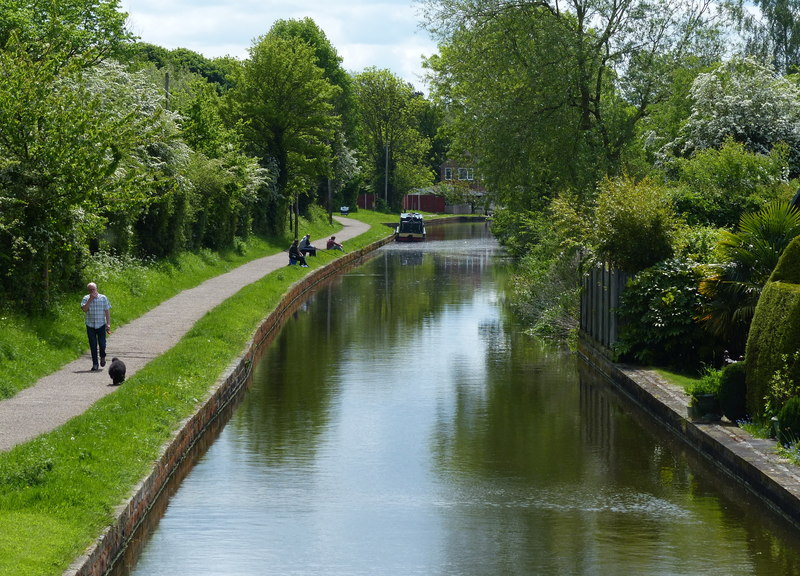
Chesterfield Canal

== History ==
The name Shireoaks derives from a group of Oak Trees which stood at the junction of the three counties Derby, Nottingham and York.

Shireoaks Hall is a Grade II* listed 17th-century country house. Shireoaks Colliery lies within what was once part of the Shireoaks Hall estate. The hall was the home of George Eddison.

=== Industrial Revolution ===
Shireoaks colliery was opened in 1854. It was closed on 25 May 1991 and was capped in August 1992. The depth of the shaft was 483.5m and the shaft's diameter was 3.66m.

== Facilities ==
The current facilities in the village include a convenience store that also functions as the post office, a small shop, bar and bistro, a primary school, a village hall, three private fishing lakes, and the Sports and Social Club which features a bowling green and a football pitch.

St Luke’s Church is within the village and is a Grade II listed building by Historic England. The church is the parish church for the village.

Canal & River Trust's Shireoaks Marina is a few minutes walk along the towpath from the village making it easily accessible for visiting boaters.

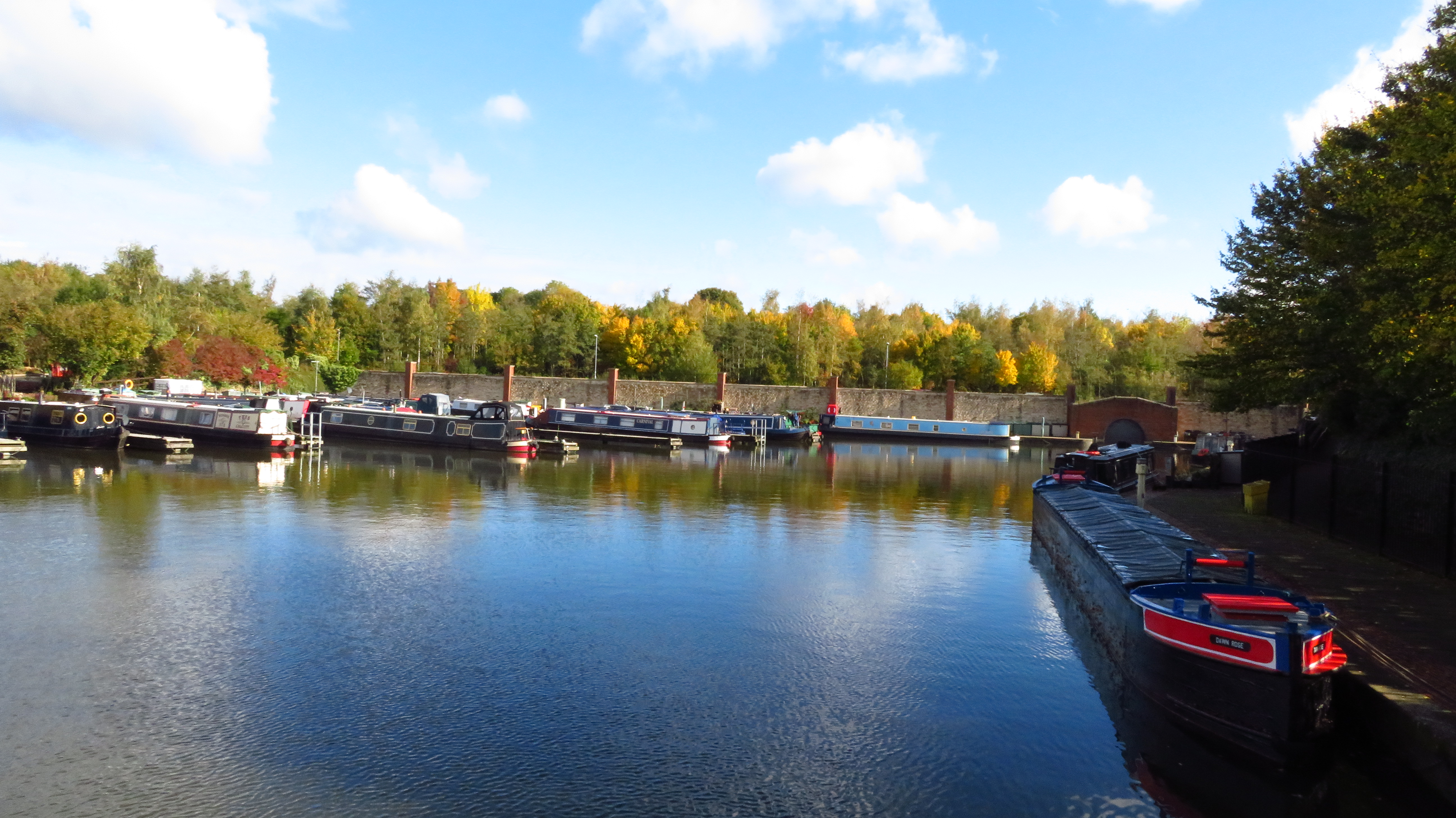
Shireoaks Marina

== Steetley Cricket Ground ==
The cricket pitch along with its bowling green and tennis courts used to belong to the Steetley works in the village and was the home ground of their sporting teams. This is now under private ownership and the pavilion has been converted into a house; the new pavilion is a converted groundsman's shed. The village went without a cricket team for many years until, in 2002, Shireoaks Cricket Club was re-established; it has gone from strength to strength, fielding two adult teams on a Sunday and providing opportunities for youth cricket to flourish. The club also fields a midweek 20/20 team, and a 7-a-side indoor team, known as the Shireoaks Snails. Shireoaks no longer use the cricket ground for home games. Woodsetts CC played 1st and 2nd team fixtures at this picturesque venue until they were forced to move elsewhere. No cricket club plays there anymore. Over the years the ground has been used for many minor county cricket matches involving the second team of Nottinghamshire, and has played host to one first-class match and one women's One Day International, these were;

- 5 July 1961 County Championship 1961 Nottinghamshire v Sussex
- 7 July 1979 West Indies Women in England 1979 3rd ODI England Women v West Indies Women

Total list of matches played:

The ground has recently been used as a training ground for the Worksop Town Football Club Academy.

== Future ==
Since the closure of Shireoaks colliery the land on which it stood has remained mostly undeveloped. A marina was constructed at the former location of the barge loading area adjacent to the Chesterfield Canal.

Due to the number of housing developments in the village and the rapid expansion of the village of Gateford near Worksop, there is concern that Shireoaks, along with the neighbouring village of Rhodesia, will soon be regarded as just a part of Worksop.

== See also ==
- Listed buildings in Shireoaks
