= RAF Finningley =

Royal Air Force base in Yorkshire, England

RAF Finningley
- Finningley, South Yorkshire in England
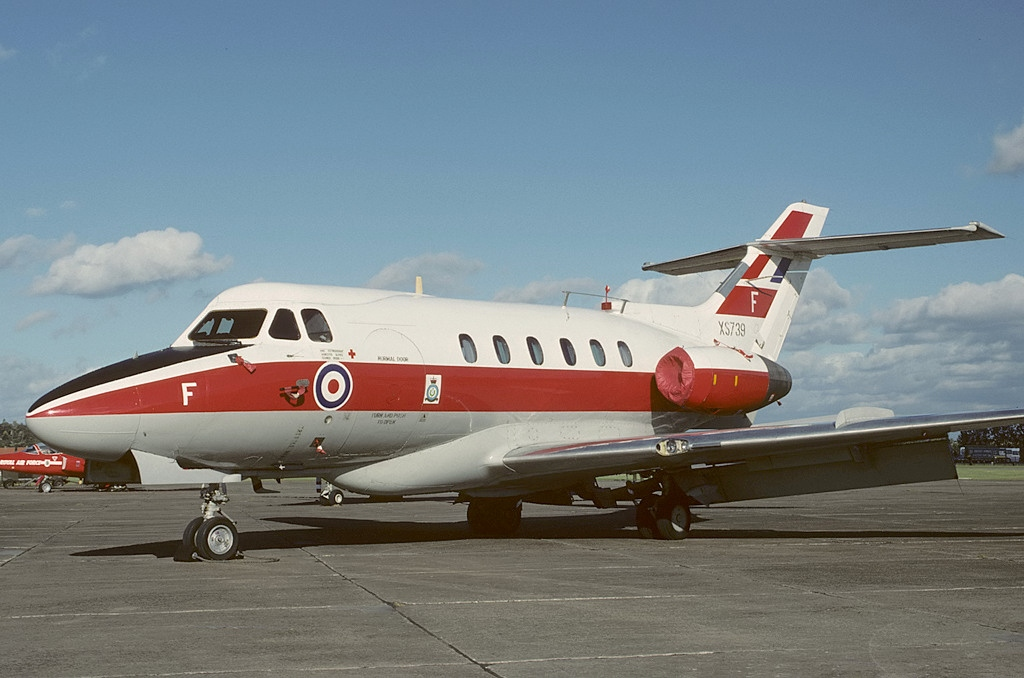
- An RAF Hawker Siddeley Dominie T1 of No. 6 Flying Training School based at Finningley.

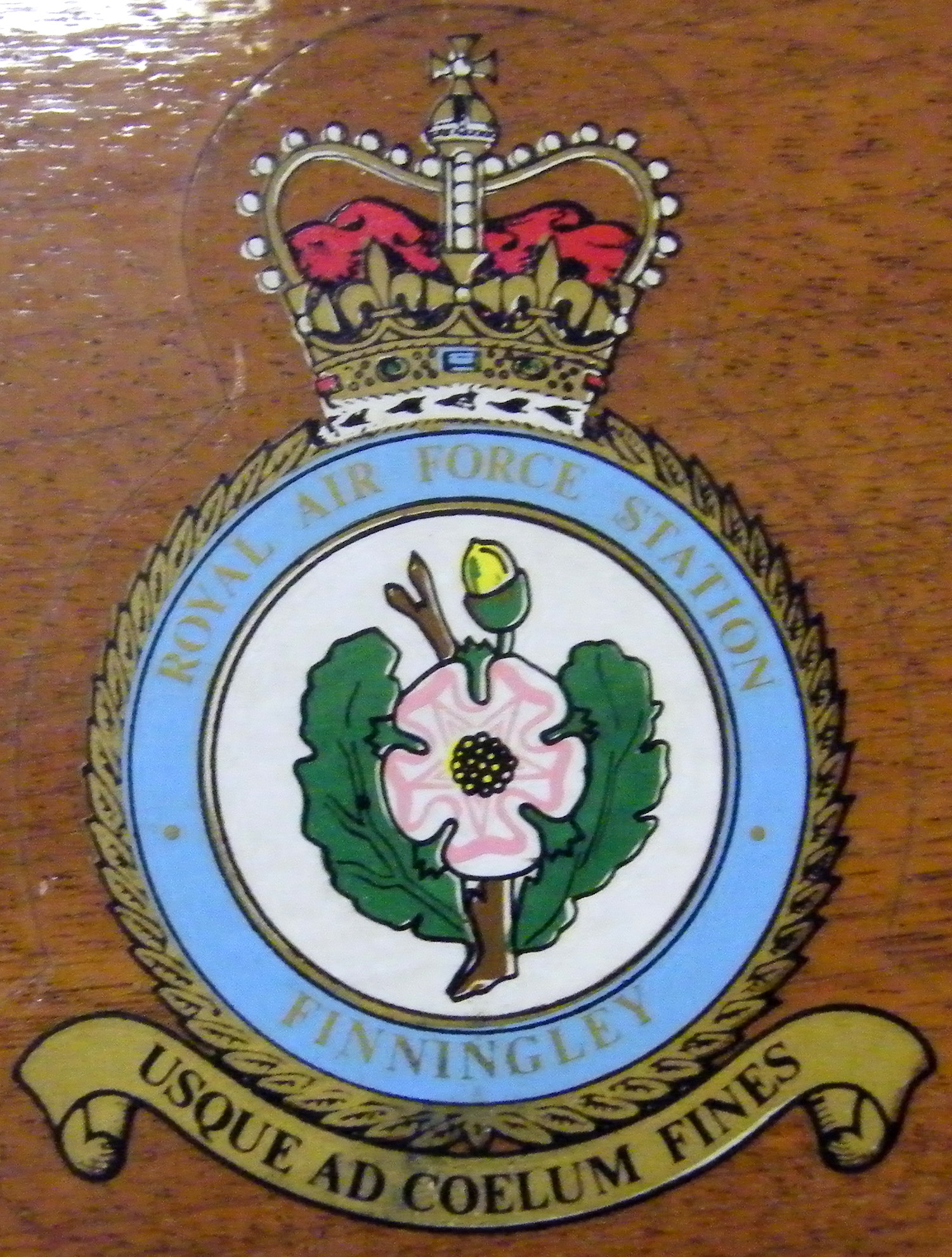
- Usque ad coelum fines (Latin for 'Extending as far as the sky')

Site information
- Type: Royal Air Force station Parent station
- Code: FV
- Owner: Ministry of Defence
- Operator: Royal Air Force
- Controlled by: RAF Bomber Command; 1936–47 & 1957–68; RAF Flying Training Command 1947–57; RAF Strike Command 1968–70; RAF Training Command 1970–76; RAF Support Command 1976–96
- Condition: Closed

Location
- Location in South Yorkshire RAF Finningley (the United Kingdom)
- Coordinates: 53°28′47″N 001°00′39″W
- Grid reference: SK 663985

Site history
- Built: 1936
- In use: September 1936–1996
- Fate: Transferred to civilian use and became Doncaster Sheffield Airport.

Airfield information
- Identifiers: IATA: FNY, ICAO: EGXI, WMO: 03360
- Elevation: 10 metres (33 ft) AMSL
Runways
Direction	Length and surface
03/21	1,830 metres (6,004 ft) Concrete
07/25	1,280 metres (4,199 ft) Concrete
12/30	1,280 metres (4,199 ft) Concrete

Royal Air Force Finningley or more simply RAF Finningley is a former Royal Flying Corps and Royal Air Force station at Finningley, in the Metropolitan Borough of Doncaster, South Yorkshire, England. The station straddled the historic county boundaries of both Nottinghamshire and the West Riding of Yorkshire.

The station was used as a bomber base during the Second World War, then in the early 1950s it had fighters allocated to it. From the late 1950s to the 1970s it was one of the home airfields of the V-bomber force, before becoming an RAF Support Command base and housing the headquarters of the RAF Search and Rescue Force.

RAF Finningley was decommissioned in 1996. The airfield was developed into an international airport named Doncaster Sheffield Airport, which opened on 28 April 2005. The closure of the airport was announced in September 2022 with the final passenger flight arriving on 4 November 2022.

== History ==
=== Origins ===
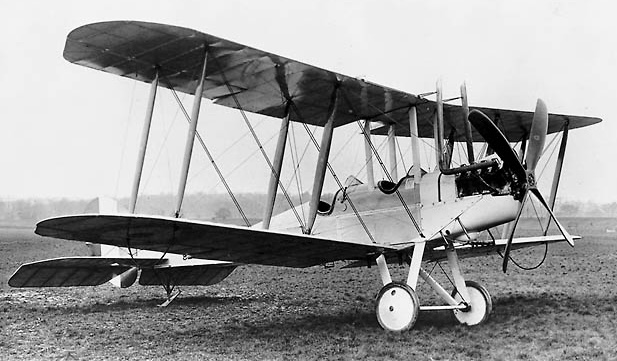
A Royal Aircraft Factory BE.2 Fighter. These were based at Finningley in 1916.

During the refurbishment of the Royal Flying Corps station at Doncaster in 1915 a decision was taken to move operations temporarily to an air strip at Brancroft Farm south of the Finningley site.

This flight of aircraft is thought to have consisted of Royal Aircraft Factory BE.2c fighters of No. 33 Squadron RAF. These fighters were used to intercept Zeppelin bombers approaching Yorkshire cities from the East Coast, in this instance, the heavily industrialised City of Sheffield.

Brancroft Farm became a Royal Flying Corps landing ground in 1916.

=== Second World War ===
Finningley's participation in RAF Bomber Command's offensive may have been short but the station played a vital part in finishing crews with operational training for the bombing role. An early pre-war expansion scheme airfield the site, farmland in a well wooded locality 4 miles (6.4 km) southeast of Doncaster was acquired in the summer of 1935. The Doncaster-Lincoln railway line ran a quarter mile to the north and Finningley village lay a similar distance to the east. The flying field covered around 250 acres (100 ha) with the camp area situated to the northwest between Mare Flats Plantation and the A1 'Great North Road' (now the A638). Five Type C hangars were erected in the usual crescent layout facing the bombing circle, with a fifth directly behind the southernmost of the line. Administration and technical site buildings were immediately to the rear of the hangars. The camp cost £430,000 (equivalent to £26,275,000 in 2025) to build and came under the command of No. 3 Bomber Group, who were headquartered at RAF Andover.

The station opened officially on 30 July 1936, however, Nos. 7 and 102 RAF Squadrons did not move in until September 1936 from RAF Worthy Down with Handley Page Heyfords. During the next year, No. 7 Squadron split into No. 76 and No. 102 similarly divided to produce No. 77 the latter two soon being moved south to RAF Honington. No. 7 Squadron converted to Whitleys in March and April 1938 while No. 76 continued to operate Wellesleys, the type it had been formed to fly. By the end of that year No. 5 Group completed its acquisition of No. 3 Group stations north of the Wash and, under its control, Finningley squadrons started conversion to the Handley Page Hampden, with Avro Ansons to fill out strength until more of this new type were available from production.

The need to establish units devoted to training crews on the new bomber types resulted in the setting up of so-called pool squadrons during the summer of 1939. A revision of this arrangement brought the designated pool squadrons into operational training units and, shortly after war was declared, both the Finningley squadrons moved to RAF Upper Heyford to form one of these organisations.

Finningley was to continue in a training role for No. 106 Squadron, which brought its Hampdens from RAF Cottesmore in October. Also classed as a reserve squadron, No. 106 continued the operational training role for No. 5 Group that the previous occupants had started to provide. The squadron also brought a flight of three Fairey battles which were used for target towing at the gunnery range at Skipsea on the Yorkshire coast.

During early 1940, Fairey Battles of 98 Squadron were moved to RAF Finningley from RAF Scampton. In June of the same year, No. 12 Squadron, also flying Fairey Battles, came to Finningley to re-arm and re-coup after suffering losses in conflict with the advancing German forces over France in May 1940. The squadron moved on to RAF Binbrook in July 1940.

By August 1940 the critical war situation caused No. 106 to be placed on operational call. Most of its early sorties were to drop mines in the approaches to French Channel ports thought to be harbouring invasion barges. There was still need for a final polish for new Hampden crews and in February 1941 No. 106 left its 'C' Flight at Finningley to continue with this task while the rest of the squadron moved to RAF Coningsby for full offensive operations. While flying from Finningley, six Hampdens had failed to return. In March the former No. 106 "C" Flight metamorphosised into No. 25 OTU, initially continuing to train with Hampdens and Ansons. A few Manchesters arrived in the spring of 1941, and the unit was later bolstered with Wellingtons.

Early in 1942 Finningley passed to No. 1 Group and with no further need for Hampdens or Manchesters No. 25 OTU concentrated on Wellingtons, nine of which were lost when the station was called upon to take part in Bomber Command operations. No. 25 OTU was disbanded in February 1943 and in March No. 18 OTU moved in from RAF Bramcote and began using RAF Bircotes and RAF Worksop as satellites. In November the Wellingtons were moved to these satellites as hard runways were to be laid at Finningley. These were put down during the winter of 1943–44, the main, 03–21 being 2,000 yards (1,830 m), 07–25 4,200 feet (1,280 m) and 12–30 4,200 feet (1,280 m). A concrete perimeter track had been laid in The 1942 and asphalt pan-type hardstandings constructed in 1940–41 linked to it, two of the original clusters crossing the A614 road between Finningley village and Bawtry. A single loop-type standing was added to bring the total to 36. Some additional domestic accommodation was provided to cater for a maximum 2,416 males and 435 females. The bomb store was in Finningley Big Wood.

The station re-opened for flying in May 1944 when No. 18 OTU returned from RAF Bramcote. By the end of that year requirements for operational training had reduced and in January 1945 the OTU was disbanded and the Wellingtons removed.

The Bomber Command Instructors School had been established at Finningley in December 1944 and this organisation, with a variety of bomber types, saw out the remaining months of the war at this station and did not depart until the spring of 1947. Navigational training was the main objective of No. 6 Flying Training School RAF, first using Vickers Varsity and later Hawker Siddeley Dominie aircraft. Although Finningley passed to RAF Support Command in 1977, its training role continued throughout in the next decade before RAF activity was terminated.

Sister RAF stations of RAF Finningley located in and around Doncaster included:

RAF Bawtry

Located at Bawtry Hall in Bawtry this was No 1 Group Bomber Command Headquarters and administration unit. The airfield at RAF Bawtry was operated by RAF Bircotes. RAF Bawtry became the centre of the RAF Meteorological Service and ceased military operations in 1986.

RAF Bircotes

A satellite from RAF Finningley operating Avro Ansons, Wellingtons, and Manchesters from No. 25 OTU. Also operating No. 1 Group RAF Bomber Command HQ Communications Flight in support of RAF Bawtry.

RAF Doncaster

First opened in 1908 as one of the world's first airports, it took on biplane fighters during the First World War to combat German Zeppelins and later became a transportation squadron during the Second World War. The runway has now been lost to urban development; however a museum remains.

RAF Lindholme

RAF Lindholme was home to the Bomber Command Bombing School (BCBS), later Strike Command Bombing School and Air Navigation School, between 1952 and 1972.

RAF Misson

An 850-acre (340 ha) bombing range used by No 25 and No 18 OTU at RAF Finningley during the Second World War. Post-war became a Bloodhound surface-to-air missile battery location as part of 94 Squadron.

RAF Sandtoft

An Avro Lancaster bomber dispersal airfield, taken over by the United States Air Force in 1957. Part is now a commercial airfield, the rest is under industrial use.

=== Post Second World War ===
From 1946 to 1954 a number of different training units were stationed at Finningley with a variety of aircraft types. No. 616 Squadron RAF was re-formed at Finningley on 31 July 1946 equipped with de Havilland Mosquito NF XXX night fighters which were replaced with Gloster Meteor F.3 day fighters a few months later.

On the Monday 11 August 1952, a Meteor F.4 serial number RA376, located at RAF Finningley, and was one of the aircraft used by No. 215 Advanced Flying School RAF (AFS) had just taken off from the airfield for an exercise when it crashed close to Firbeck Hall in Nottinghamshire, approximately 8 miles (13 km) from the runway. A number of units withdrew in 1954 (including No. 215 ATS) leaving only the Meteors of No. 616 Squadron, Royal Auxiliary Air Force, manned largely by part-time personnel, but their days at Finningley were numbered for in May 1955 the squadron moved to RAF Worksop. The reason was that Finningley was about to be given a new lease of life as a V bomber station.

=== The Cold War years and after ===
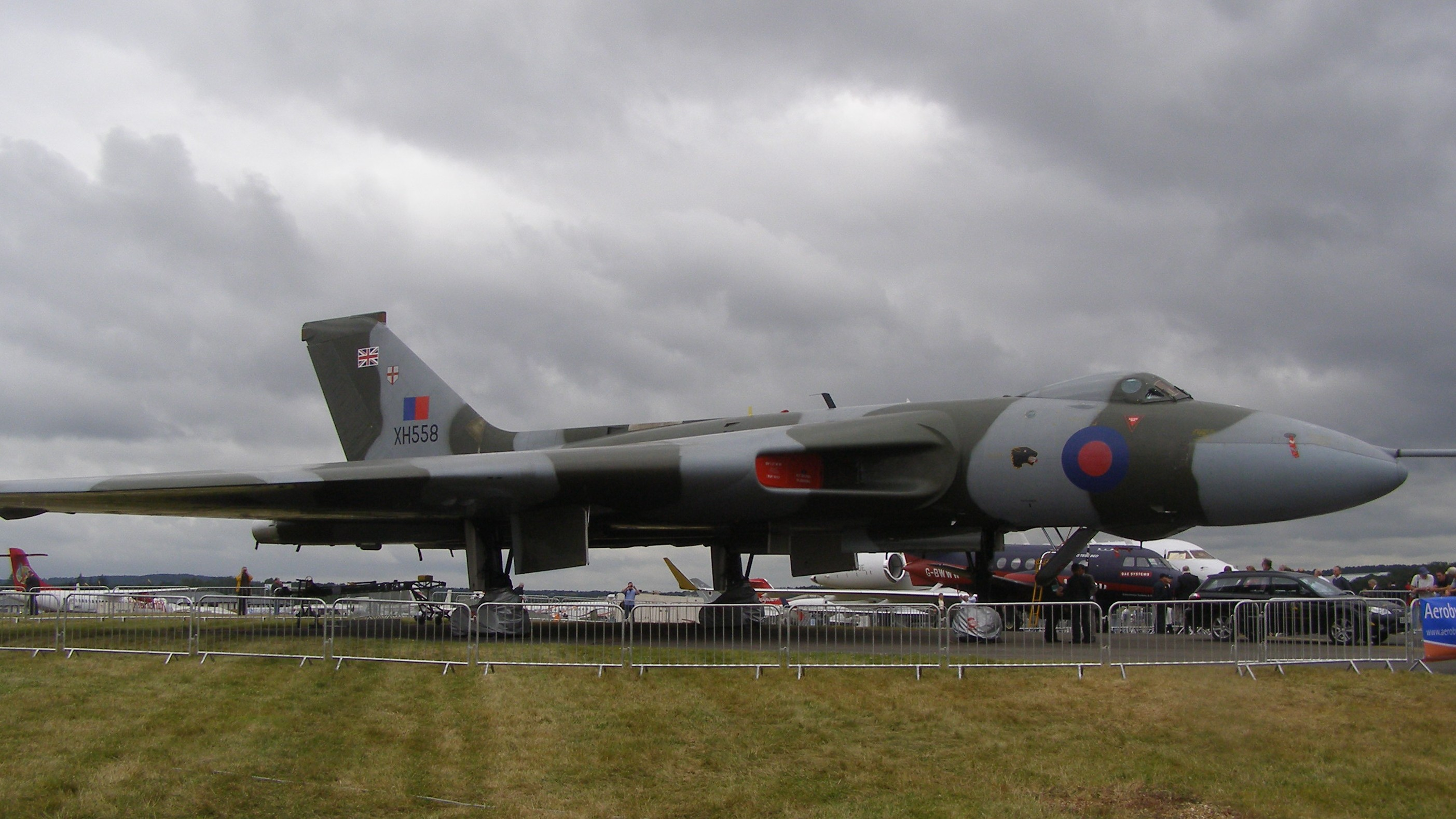
Vulcan XH558 was based at Finningley between 1960 and 1968

During the next two years work was carried out to re-lay and extend the main runway to approximately 3,000 yards (2,700 m). Unit stores for atomic weapons were also constructed to house Green Grass in Yellow Sun, Violet Club and Blue Steel weapons. The airfield became known as the home of the 'V' Bomber after Avro Vulcans, Handley Page Victors and Vickers Valiants had all been stationed at the base.

Finningley re-opened in the spring of 1957, No. 101 Squadron was re-formed in October that year to operate Vulcan bombers. A year later No. 18 Squadron RAF with ECM Vickers Valiants was also established at Finningley. In 1961, No. 101 Squadron RAF took its Vulcans to RAF Waddington changing places with the Vulcan training organisation, No. 230 Operational Conversion Unit RAF.

It was two years from 101 Sqn leaving that in 1961, the Valiant having seen its day, No. 18 Squadron was disbanded.

The Vulcan OCU was based at RAF Finningley from June 1961 until December 1969.

Handley Page Victor bombers were added to the Finningley scene in later years before RAF Strike Command (the amalgamation of Bomber Command and Fighter Command on 30 April 1968) moved its units out and Training Command took over the station in May 1970.

In 1970 there was an arson attack on Number 2 Hangar by a serving RAF member. After the hangar was locked and secured at 17:00 he lit a fire under an aircraft with catastrophic results. The hangar was badly damaged, and the perpetrator charged and imprisoned.

In January 1976, the headquarters of search and rescue No. 22 Squadron were based at Finningley, with flights detached at Brawdy, Coltishall, Leconfield, Leuchars and Valley. In 1978 the HQ was awarded a new standard reflecting its 4,500 human rescues and its 93 peacetime gallantry awards since the end of the Second World War.

On 14 January 1992, a new Air Navigation School building was opened, built at a cost of £5.2m.

Arguably the most famous of the Finningley's Avro Vulcan Bombers is XH558. On 1 July 1960 XH558 was the first Vulcan B.2 to enter RAF service and was immediately transferred to No. 230 Operational Conversion Unit at RAF Finningley.

=== Museum exhibit ===
XH558 was restored to flight by the Vulcan to the Sky Trust and the aircraft was displayed during airshows until the end of 2015. On 29 March 2011 XH558 returned to Doncaster airport and Finningley, and she was once again at her original home. XH558 still resides there now, she remains in operating condition but without a permit to fly. Unfortunately, the three expert companies who were supporting the Vulcan in remaining airborne – BAE Systems, Marshall Aerospace and Defence Group and Rolls-Royce, collectively known as the 'technical authorities' – decided to cease their support at the end of the 2015 flying season. Without their support, under Civil Aviation Authority regulations, XH558 is prohibited from flying. Since moving to Doncaster, the Vulcan and Canberra WK163 have been removed from the hangar and have been left outside. Doncaster Council approved construction of a special built hangar for XH558 and WK163 in 2018, but the project was cancelled completely in February 2022 as not enough money had been raised to meet the £2.2 million cost.

As of October 2025, the Vulcan to the Sky Trust (VTST) had launched a new fundraising campaign, and hoped that the Vulcan could remain at Doncaster Sheffield as a static exhibit, despite the uncertain future ownership of the site.

== Facilities ==
=== Aircrew training ===
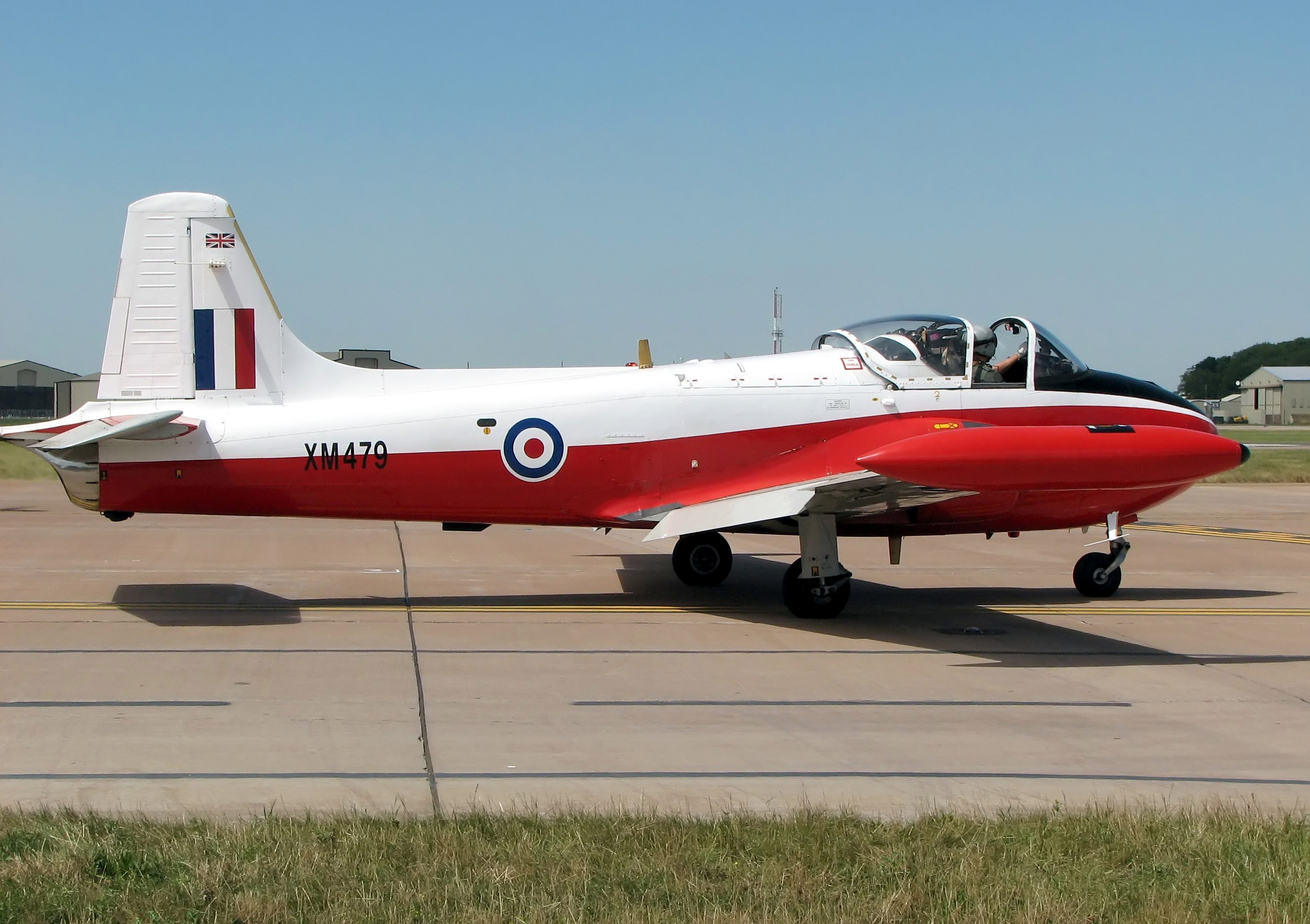
A Jet Provost flight training aircraft

During the 1970s all RAF navigators passed through the Air Navigation School (ANS) of No. 6 Flying Training School (FTS) at RAF Finningley, when the BAe Dominie T.1 s of No. 1 ANS from RAF Stradishall and the Varsities of No. 2 ANS from RAF Gaydon moved there. In 1970, a Varsity aircraft caught fire in one of Hangars and subsequently destroyed 2 other aircraft by setting them ablaze. Low level navigation training took place on the BAC Jet Provost, eventually using the T.5A variant. The Vickers Varsity was phased out in 1976 making No. 6 FTS an all-jet school. RAF Finningley also played host to multi-engine training and operational navigation training again via 6 FTS was responsible for training all the Royal Air Force multi-engine pilots using twin-turboprop Handley Page Jetstream T.1 aircraft. Later the Jet Provost T.5A aircraft were replaced on 14 August 1993 by the British Aerospace Hawk T.1 aircraft which joined on 10 September 1992 and the Short Tucano T.1 from 6 April 1992. The school operated two new wings from October 1992, these being the Basic Navigation Wing and the Advanced Navigation Wing. During April 1995, the Tucano Element moved to RAF Topcliffe.

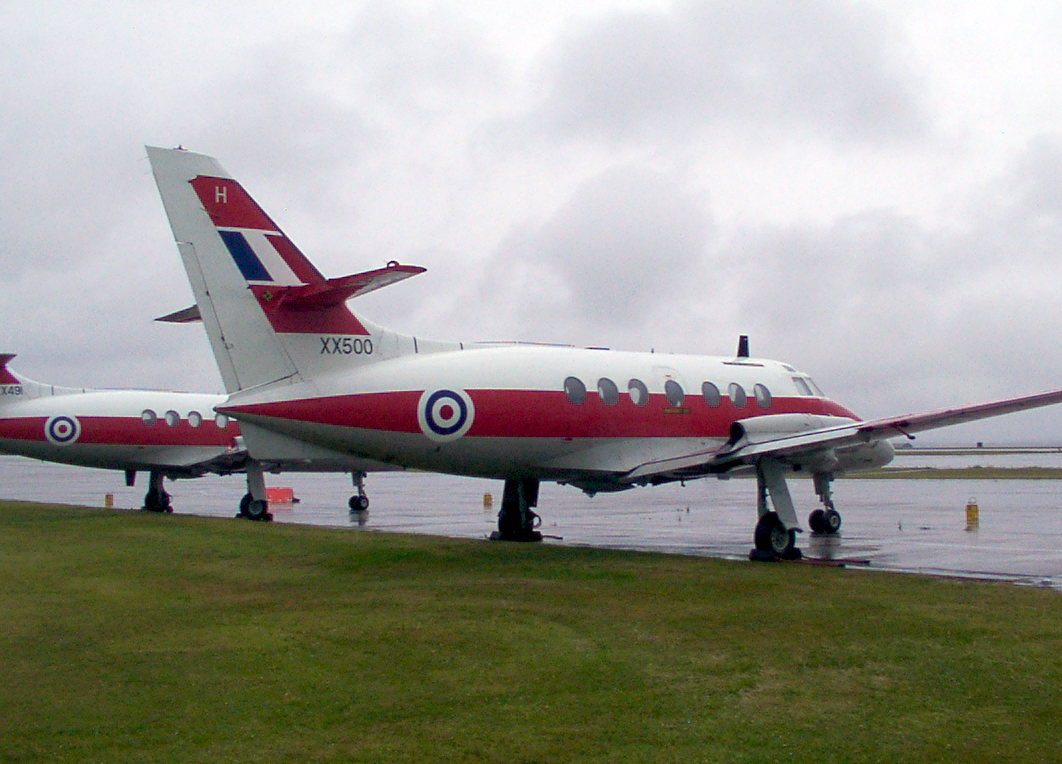
Jetstream T1 training aircraft

RAF Finningley was also home to all initial airman aircrew training (Air Electronics, Engineer & Loadmaster School RAF). Finningley was also home to the Yorkshire Universities Air Squadron, that flew the Scottish Aviation Bulldog at the time, as well as Chipmunk T.10s of No. 9 Air Experience Flight. In its last years as an RAF station, Finningley was home to 100 Squadron which had moved from RAF Wyton. The squadron's main tasks were as a target facilities flight providing airborne targets for surface-based radar and missile sites, and as a provider of small and agile 'aggressor' aircraft for Dissimilar air combat training (DACT) for UK-based operational aircraft.

=== RAF Search and Rescue ===
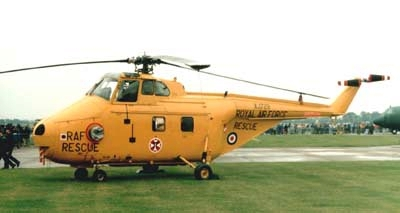
RAF Westland Whirlwind XJ729 of No 22 Sqn seen here at RAF Finningley in 1985

The RAF Search and Rescue Wing was first formed at RAF Finningley in 1976, when two squadrons, No. 22 Squadron and No. 202 Squadron, came together from RAF Thorney Island and RAF Leconfield. Finningley became the administrative home of the two squadrons with their bright yellow painted Westland Whirlwind HAR.10, Westland Sea King HAR.3 and Westland Wessex HAR.2 helicopters. All major engineering work was carried out by the Engineering Squadron in Hangar 1. The wing was disbanded on 1 December 1992.

=== RAF Finningley Battle of Britain Air Display ===
The first air display at Finningley was held in September 1945. For two decades RAF Finningley was home to the Battle of Britain Air Display which was the largest one-day airshow event in the country, and a similar show was held in Scotland at RAF Leuchars in Fife on the same day as that at Finningley each year. The aerobatic airshow and the display of military capabilities, such as an Avro Vulcan bomber scramble, became so well known nationally that the show attracted huge crowds and eventually became televised on national TV.

In 1977, the Queen's Silver Jubilee Air Show was held at RAF Finningley, replacing for that year the Battle of Britain Air Show.

== List of Station Commanders ==
- December 1973, Group Captain Derek F Miller DFC, born 1924, attended the City Grammar School in Lincoln; he joined the RAF in 1942, and served with two Pathfinder Avro Lancaster squadrons as a navigator, married with a son; he died of cancer aged 51 in hospital
- 16 December 1977, Group Captain Leslie W F Wheeler
- early October 1985, Group Captain Willie Rae, aged 45, attended Aberdeen Grammar School
- 2 October 1987, Group Captain Graham R Pitchfork
- mid-August 1989, Group Captain David H Phillips, aged 44, he joined the RAF in 1963
- 21 September 1991, Group Captain Alan Ferguson, joined the RAF in 1963
- August 1993, Group Captain David Wilby

== Closure ==
In 1994 the Ministry of Defence announced the imminent closure of RAF Finningley as part of the Front Line First defence cuts. It closed in 1996, being earmarked for a new prison; however, this plan was dropped and three years later Peel Holdings, a property and transport company, bought the land and transformed it into Doncaster Sheffield Airport.

== Units ==
The following units were also here at some point:

- No. 1 Group Communication Flight RAF
- No. 1 Group Standardisation Unit RAF
- No. 1 (Pilots) Refresher Flying Unit RAF
- No. 2 (Pilots) Refresher Flying Unit RAF
- No. 5 Group Pool RAF
- No. 5 Group Training Flight RAF
- No. 6 Anti-Aircraft Co-operation Unit RAF
- No. 7 Anti-Aircraft Co-operation Unit RAF
- No. 7 Blind Approach Training Flight RAF
- No. 9 Air Experience Flight RAF
- No. 18 Operational Training Unit RAF
- No. 21 Operational Training Unit RAF
- No. 25 Operational Training Unit RAF
- No. 45 Squadron RAF
- No. 64 Group Communication Flight RAF
- No. 101 Flying Refresher School RAF
- No. 202 Advanced Flying School RAF
- No. 215 Advanced Flying School RAF
- No. 230 Operational Conversion Unit RAF
- No. 1507 (Beam Approach Training) Flight RAF
- No. 1521 (Beam Approach Training) Flight RAF
- No. 1685 (Bomber) Defence Training Flight RAF
- Air Electronics, Engineer & Loadmaster School RAF
- Bomber Command Development Unit RAF
- Electronic Counter Measures Modification Centre RAF
- Flying Refresher School RAF
- Joint Forward Air Controller Training & Standards Unit RAF
- Multi-Engine Training Squadron RAF
- RAF Central Night Vision Training School RAF
- Sea King Command Engineering Development & Investigation Team RAF
- Search & Rescue Helicopter Wing RAF
- Strike Command Development Unit RAF
- Yorkshire Universities Air Squadron
- No 100 Squadron. Hawk Aircraft. Pilot and Navigator training. Target Towing.

== Badge and motto ==
The badge of RAF Finningley, awarded in 1948, showed a Yorkshire Rose on top of a sprig of oak. The rose represented Yorkshire and the oak Nottinghamshire, as the base straddled the border between the two at its southern end. The motto was Usque ad coelum fines, which is Latin for Extending as far as the sky.

== In popular culture ==
Finningley has made at least one momentary appearance in fiction in the BBC film Threads, before the base is destroyed by a Soviet nuclear warhead.

== Notable personnel ==
- Group Captain J. A. C. Aiken, commanding officer in the 1960s
- Air Chief Marshal John Boothman, commanding officer in the early 1940s
- Group Captain Montagu Dawson, commanding officer in the 1970s
- Group Captain A. W. Heward
- Joan Hughes, an ATA pilot who delivered aircraft to Finningley during the Second World War, having a wheels locked up accident at the base in a Hawker Hurricane she was delivering from RAF Prestwick.
- Group Captain H. J. F. Hunter, commanding officer in the 1930s
- Rory Underwood, served as a pilot on 100 squadron in 1995
