= Howard Mayers =

Australian flying ace

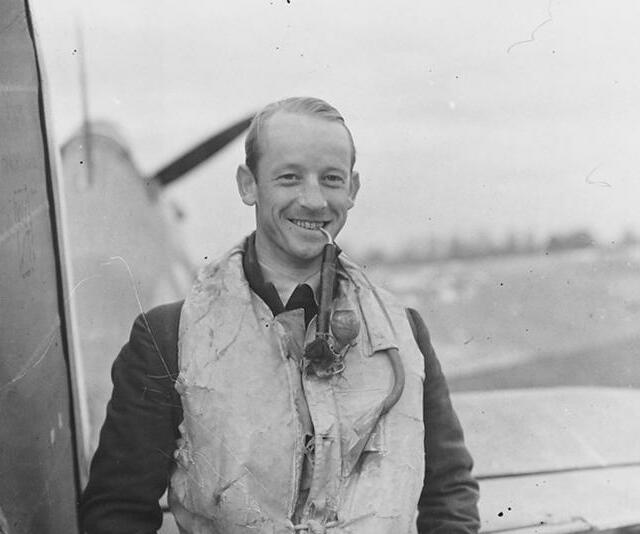
- Mayers in 1940
- Born: 9 January 1910; Sydney, Australia
- Died: c. mid/late 1942 (aged 32)
- Military career
- Allegiance: United Kingdom
- Branch: Royal Air Force Volunteer Reserve
- Rank: Wing commander
- Service number: 77976
- Commands: No. 239 Wing; No. 94 Squadron
- Conflicts: Second World War; Battle of Britain; Channel Front; Western Desert campaign
- Awards: Distinguished Service Order; Distinguished Flying Cross & Bar; Mention in Despatches

Howard Clive Mayers, DSO, DFC & Bar (9 January 1910 – c. mid/late 1942) was an Australian flying ace of the Royal Air Force Volunteer Reserve (RAFVR) during the Second World War. He was credited with the destruction of at least eleven enemy aircraft.

From Sydney, Mayers studied at the University of Cambridge before becoming a businessman in London. Called up for duty in the RAFVR soon after the outbreak of the Second World War, he was posted to No. 601 Squadron after completing his training. Flying during the Battle of Britain, he destroyed a number of aircraft but was shot down himself twice. In mid-1941, he was sent to the Middle East and given command of No. 94 Squadron, leading it during Operation Crusader. He was later commander of a wing in Egypt. He went missing after being forced to land in the Western Desert in July 1942 and is believed to have died, either by ground fire or later while being transported to Europe for internment in a prisoner of war camp.

== Early life ==
Born in Sydney, Australia, on 9 January 1910, Howard Clive Mayers was the son of George Russell Mayers and his wife Penelope. After completing his schooling in Australia, he went to England where he studied at the University of Cambridge's Jesus College. While there, he joined the Cambridge University Air Squadron. He later lived in London and went into business as a company director.

== Second World War ==
A serving member of the Royal Air Force Volunteer Reserve, Mayers was called up for service soon after the outbreak of the Second World War. Allocated the service number 77976, he was commissioned as a probationary pilot officer on 11 March 1940 in the General Duties Branch. After completing his training, he was posted to No. 601 (County of London) Squadron on 3 August, at the time based at Tangmere and operating the Hawker Hurricane fighter. The squadron was well known for its upper-class pilots and was nicknamed the "Millionaire's Squadron".

=== Battle of Britain ===
No. 601 Squadron was heavily engaged in the Battle of Britain, with Mayers shooting down a Messerschmitt Bf 109 fighter south of St Catherine's Point on 8 August. It was part of an escort for several Junkers Ju 87 dive bombers targeting shipping in the English Channel. Mayers destroyed a Junkers Ju 88 medium bomber on 12 August, and the following day claimed another Ju 88 and a Messerschmitt Bf 110 heavy fighter as probably destroyed, and also damaged a further Bf 110. However, he was shot down himself, baling out at 19,000 feet (5,800 m) and coming down into the English Channel near Portland. Having received minor wounds to his legs, he was rescued by a motor torpedo boat. After hospital treatment, he returned to No. 601 Squadron later in the day. On 16 August, he shot down two Ju 87s and claimed another as a probable. He destroyed a Bf 109 over Selsey two days later. At the end of the month, flying from Debden, he destroyed a Dornier Do 17 medium bomber that was attacking the London docks and claimed another as damaged.

On 4 September, having returned to Tangmere, Mayers destroyed a Do 17 and had a half share in a Bf 110 probably destroyed, both south of Worthing. He shot down a Bf 110 on 25 September and damaged a Do 17 the same day. On 1 October, and by this time holding the rank of flying officer, his award of the Distinguished Flying Cross (DFC) was announced in The London Gazette. The published citation read:

This officer has participated in a number of interceptions and has destroyed seven enemy aircraft and possibly three others. During a recent engagement, a cannon shell passed through the port wing of his aircraft making a hole four feet in diameter, but Flying Officer Mayers succeeded in bringing his aircraft safely to base. He has displayed great courage and a fighting spirit.

— London Gazette, No. 34958, 1 October 1940

Mayers was shot down again on 7 October, crash-landing near Lyme Regis after an encounter with a Bf 110. Wounded, he was hospitalised at Torquay and this ended his involvement in the Battle of Britain.

In December, No. 601 Squadron was moved to Northolt in Middlesex, where it spent the winter months. The squadron carried out missions escorting bombers to targets in France. On one of these, on 10 February 1941, one of the Hurricanes in Mayers' flight was shot down, its pilot baling out and coming down in the English Channel. Mayers guided a motor torpedo boat to the rescue of the downed pilot. In early May, Mayers was shot down again and had to bale out to the north of Dover. At the end of the month, he was posted to the Middle East.

=== Middle East ===
Shortly after arriving in Egypt, Mayers was given command of No. 94 Squadron, equipped with Hurricanes and based at Ismailia, near the Suez Canal. After a few months, the squadron shifted to Ballah and, on 11 September, he had a third of a share in a destroyed Ju 88. Having been an acting flight lieutenant for some time, his rank was made substantive in October. During Operation Crusader, which commenced in mid-November, the squadron flew extensively, carrying out bomber escort duties and strafing enemy vehicle columns. He damaged two Bf 109s during this time. As Operation Crusader drew to a close, on 29 December, he led his squadron, together with No. 260 Squadron, in the strafing of a German transport column. The Hurricane of one of his pilots was damaged by anti-aircraft fire and had to force land behind the German lines. Despite the Germans being in close proximity, Mayers landed his own Hurricane to collect the pilot; despite both men jammed into the cockpit, he was able to take off and return to the squadron's base.

Mayers, having been promoted to acting squadron leader, was mentioned in despatches on 1 January 1942 in connection with his services in the war. The following month, he was awarded a bar to his DFC for the rescue of his downed pilot late the previous year; the citation, published on 13 February, read:

This officer has led his wing on a large number of sorties during the Libyan Campaign. His mastery of tactics and skilful planning of operations have contributed largely to the many successes obtained. One day in December, 1941, during a machine gun attack against an enemy column, Wing Commander Mayers observed a member of his formation shot down by anti-aircraft fire. When the attack was concluded, he skilfully landed near the crashed aircraft and although enemy vehicles were approaching, coolly waited for his comrade to reach him. Putting him in the seat, Wing Commander Mayers clambered in on top of him and took off as the enemy neared the aircraft. He finally flew safely to base. This officer has always shown great courage and leadership. He has destroyed at least 11 enemy aircraft.

— London Gazette, No. 35454, 13 February 1942

In mid-April, Mayers' rank of squadron leader was made substantive. By this time he was an acting wing commander and at the end of the month he was given command of No. 239 Wing; this consisted of Nos. 3, 112, and 250 Squadrons, all operating P-40 Kittyhawk fighters. The following month, the wing encountered several German transports and destroyed 13 of them; Mayers shot down one Junkers Ju 52 and damaged another. A Bf 109 was destroyed by Mayers on 8 July.

On 20 July, Mayers was leading the wing over the Qattara Depression in the Western Desert and, having already shot down a Macchi C.202 fighter, his aircraft was damaged in a dogfight. He made a forced landing in the desert and, although his aircraft was later found, he was not with it and was assumed to have been made a prisoner of war. He is believed to have died while being transported to Europe to be interned. However the official history of Australian air operations in the Second World War provides a differing account of his death, specifically that he was shot down and killed by ground fire on 20 July. Regardless, Mayers was posthumously awarded the Distinguished Service Order, the published citation reading:

Wing Commander Mayers has commanded a wing since April, 1942. He is an expert in bombing and machine gun attacks, whilst his tactical knowledge has contributed much to the success of long range fighter operations. On two occasions in May, 1942, this officer led a formation in attacks on aircraft bringing supplies to the enemy and destroyed many of them. Wing Commander Mayers has displayed gallantry and great devotion to duty in the direction of recent intensive operations.

— London Gazette, No. 35646, 28 July 1942

Survived by his wife Betty Mary, at the time of his presumed death, Mayers was credited with having shot down eleven enemy aircraft, with a share in another aircraft destroyed. He is also credited with three probably destroyed, a probable shared destroyed, and six damaged. He is remembered on the Alamein Memorial in Egypt and, as an Australian who died while serving in the armed forces of the United Kingdom, his name is recorded in the Commemorative Roll at the Australian War Memorial in Canberra.
