= No. 94 Squadron RAF =

Defunct flying squadron of the Royal Air Force

- Active: 1 Aug 1917–30 June 1919; 26 Mar 1939–20 April 1945; 15 Dec 1950–15 Sep 1957; 1 Oct 1960–30 June 1963
- Country: United Kingdom
- Branch: Royal Air Force
- Motto: "Avenge"

Commanders
- Notable commanders: Howard Mayers; Russell Foskett; Arthur Clowes

Insignia
- Squadron badge heraldry: A wolf's head erased.
- Squadron codes: ZG Apr 1939 – Sep 1939; GO Sep 1939 – Apr 1945; FZ Feb 1942 – May 1942; A Dec 1950 – 1955

No. 94 Squadron RAF was a unit of the Royal Air Force that served during World War I and World War II. The squadron has been formed a total of four times.

== World War I ==
The squadron was formed at Harling Road on 1 August 1917 as a training unit for the Sopwith Camel. Mobilised in May 1918, the Squadron moved to France at the end of October with S.E.5A's, but due to the end of the war being imminent, the squadron returned to the UK, without seeing any action, in February 1919 and disbanded on 30 June 1919 at Bramham Moor Aerodrome.

== World War II ==
On 26 March 1939, the squadron was reformed at RAF Khormaksar as a fighter squadron for the defence of the Aden Protectorate. During April 1941, the squadron handed over operations to the South African Air Force together with its Gladiators. Moving to Egypt, the squadron was re-equipped with Hurricanes in May.

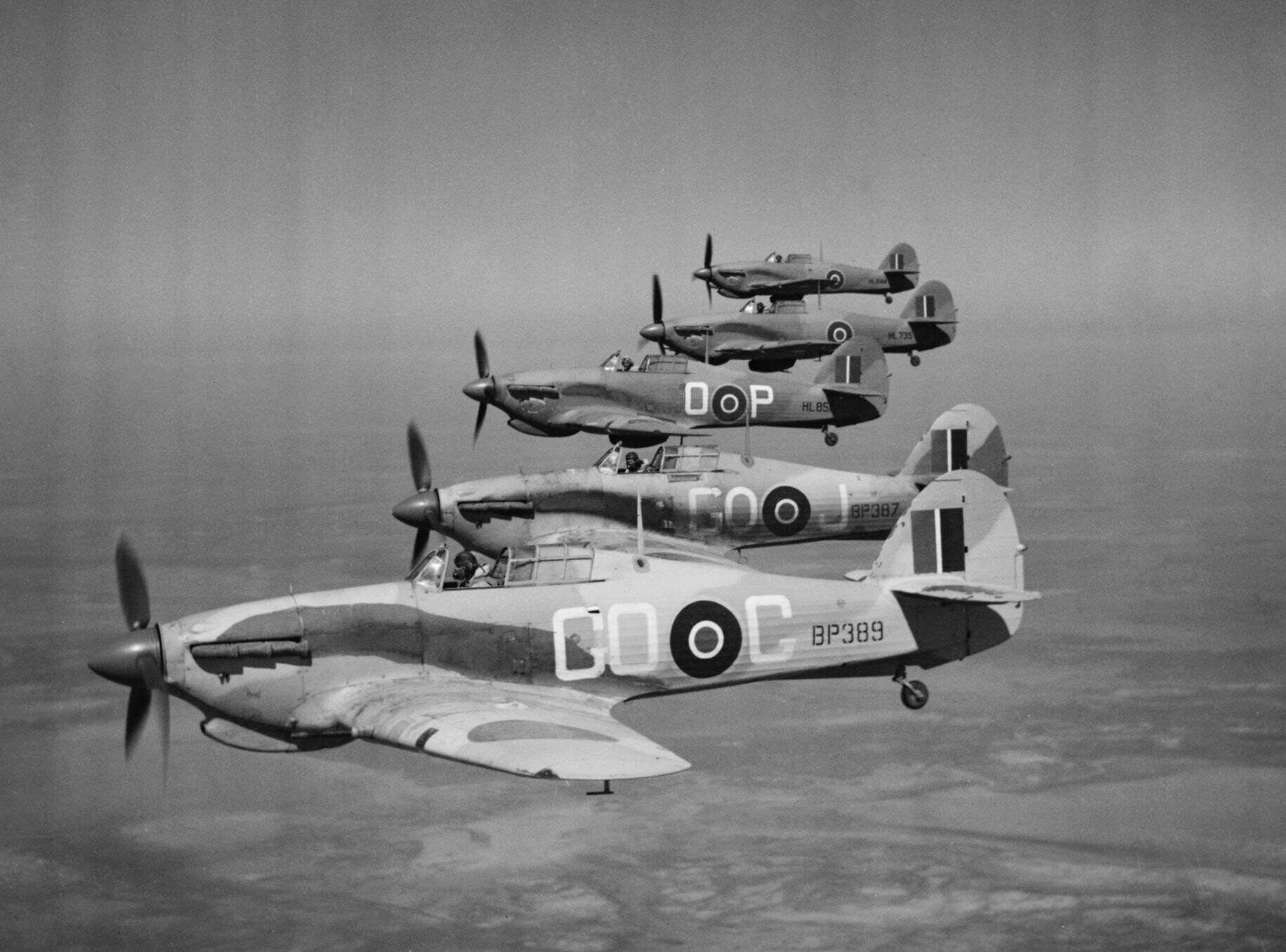
94 Sqn Hurricane IICs over Egypt, in 1942.

As part of the Western Desert campaign and undertaking day and night defensive patrols, the squadron began ground attack missions in November. The squadron converted to Kittyhawks in February 1942 as part of its change to fighter patrols over the desert until May, when it was withdrawn from the front line to receive Hurricanes for defensive duties. In February 1944, the squadron converted to Spitfires, which were used on sweeps over Crete, and in September the squadron moved to Greece. In December 1944, it provided air support for the Army during its clashes in Athens with the Communist-controlled EAM-ELAS guerrillas and was disbanded on 20 April 1945.

== Cold War ==
On 15 December 1950, the squadron was reformed at RAF Celle in Germany as a Vampire fighter-bomber squadron. The squadron was re-equipped with Venoms in January 1954 and was disbanded on 15 September 1957. The squadron was reformed again at RAF Misson, near RAF Finningley, on 1 October 1960 as a Bloodhound air defence missile unit which disbanded on 30 June 1963.
