= RAF Worksop =

Former Royal Air Force station in Nottinghamshire, England

RAF Worksop RAF Scofton
- Scofton, Nottinghamshire in England

Site information
- Type: Satellite station
- Code: WP
- Owner: Air Ministry
- Operator: Royal Air Force
- Controlled by: RAF Bomber Command * No. 91 (OTU) Group RAF

Location
- Shown within Nottinghamshire RAF Worksop (the United Kingdom)
- Coordinates: 53°19′28″N 001°03′37″W

Site history
- Built: 1920 and 1940
- Built by: Wimpey & Carmichael
- In use: November 1943–1948; 1952 – December 1960
- Battles/wars: European theatre of World War II

Airfield information
- Elevation: 44 metres (144 ft) AMSL
Runways
Direction	Length and surface
00/00	Asphalt
00/00	Asphalt
00/00	Asphalt

Royal Air Force Worksop, or more simply RAF Worksop, is a former Royal Air Force satellite station located at Scofton, 2.8 miles (4.5 km) north east of Worksop, Nottinghamshire and 4.7 miles (7.6 km) west of Retford, Nottinghamshire, England.

== Station history ==
- No. 18 Operational Training Unit RAF between September 1943 and December 1944 with various aircraft including Miles Martinets, Airspeed Oxfords, Curtiss P-40 Curtiss Tomahawks and Vickers Wellingtons
- No 1 Engine Control and Demonstration Unit RAF between February 1945 and January 1946
- No 1 Group Communication Flight RAF between December 1945 and January 1946
- No. 4 Flying Training School RAF between June 1956 and June 1958
- No. 211 Advanced Flying School RAF between August 1952 and June 1954 became No. 211 Flying Training School RAF between June 1954 and June 1956
- No. 616 Squadron RAF from 23 May 1955 with the Gloster Meteor F.8 before being disbanded on 10 March 1957
- Bomber Command Central Night Vision School RAF between December 1945 and March 1946
- RAF Central Vision Training School RAF between March 1946 and June 1948
- Transport Command Central Vision Training School RAF between November 1946 and May 1958

== Current use ==
The site is currently used for farming with few remaining signs of the former airfield.

== See also ==
- List of former Royal Air Force stations
