= St Luke's Church, Shireoaks =

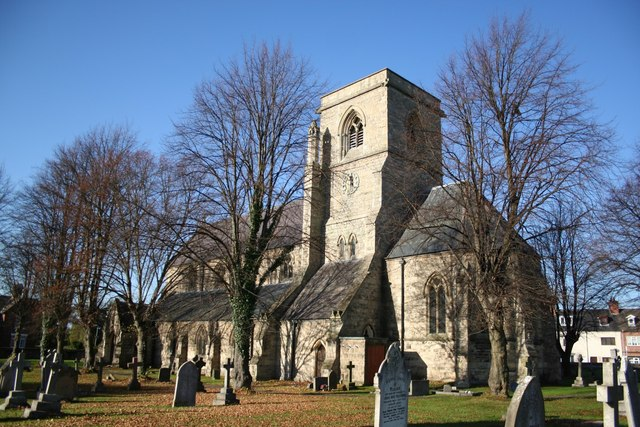
- St Luke's Church, Shireoaks
- St Luke's Church, Shireoaks
- 53°19′21″N 1°10′13″W
- OS grid reference: SK 55376 80940
- Location: Shireoaks
- Country: England
- Denomination: Church of England

History
- Dedication: St Luke

Architecture
- Heritage designation: Grade II listed

Administration
- Province: York
- Diocese: Diocese of Southwell and Nottingham
- Archdeaconry: Newark
- Deanery: Bassetlaw and Bawtry
- Parish: Shireoaks

St Luke's Church, Shireoaks is a Grade II listed Church of England parish church in Shireoaks, Nottinghamshire.

== History ==
The church was built in a Decorated style in 1861-63 by T. C. Hine and Robert Evans for the fifth Duke of Newcastle. The Foundation stone was laid on 18 October 1861 (St Luke's day) by the Prince of Wales who was staying at Clumber Park with Henry Pelham-Clinton, 5th Duke of Newcastle.

The church was dedicated on the same day in 1863 by the Bishop of Lincoln, Rt. Revd John Jackson.

Originally the church had a spire but this was removed in 1975.

== Organ ==
The pipe organ dates from 1896 and was built by Forster and Andrews. A specification of the organ can be found on the National Pipe Organ Register.

== Bells ==
The church tower contains a ring of 6 bells dating from 1863/64. They were cast by John Taylor & Co of Loughborough.

== See also ==
- Listed buildings in Shireoaks
