= Listed buildings in Shireoaks =

Shireoaks is a civil parish in the Bassetlaw District of Nottinghamshire, England. The parish contains eight listed buildings that are recorded in the National Heritage List for England. Of these, three are listed at Grade II*, the middle of the three grades, and the others are at Grade II, the lowest grade. The parish contains the village of Shireoaks and the surrounding area. The most important building in the parish is Shireoaks Hall, which is listed together with associated structures. The other listed buildings are a barn, a church, a community centre and a war memorial.

== Key ==
Grade	Criteria
II*	Particularly important buildings of more than special interest
II	Buildings of national importance and special interest

== Buildings ==
Name and location	Photograph	Date	Notes	Grade
Shireoaks Hall; 53.31947°N 1.17223°W		c. 1614	A small country house that has been altered and is derelict. It is in stone on a chamfered plinth, with floor and lintel bands, string courses, and a coped parapet, partly embattled. There are three storeys and a basement, a cruciform plan, and a front of seven bays. Some windows are sashes, some are mullioned and transomed, there is a French window with a moulded hood, and other openings are blocked.	II*
Barn, Hall Farm; 53.31918°N 1.16977°W	—	17th century	The barn is timber framed with brick and stone infill, mainly rendered, on a stone plinth, with a pantile roof. There is a single storey and nine bays. It contains various doorways and casement windows.	II
East stable, Shireoaks Hall; 53.31977°N 1.17253°W	—	Early 18th century	The east stable is in stone with moulded eaves and a hipped slate roof. There are two storeys and four bays. On the front is a doorway and windows with fanlights, above are four mullioned casements, and in the right return are a doorway with a chamfered surround and a keystone, and a hatch above.	II*
Ha-ha, Shireoaks Hall; 53.31892°N 1.17263°W	—	Early 18th century	The ha-ha is 100 metres (330 ft) to the southwest of the house. It is in stone with coping, and extends for about 150 metres (490 ft).	II
West stable and outbuildings, Shireoaks Hall; 53.31982°N 1.17232°W		Early 18th century	The west stable is in stone with moulded eaves and a hipped slate roof. There are two storeys and four bays. On the front is a doorway and windows, above are four mullioned, and in the left return are a doorway with a chamfered surround and a keystone. At the rear is a wing with a single storey, five bays and a pantile roof.	II*
Community Centre; 53.32206°N 1.17022°W		1809–10	A chapel, converted into a school in 1864, and later a community centre, it is in stone on a stepped plinth, with a sill band, and a slate roof with pedimented gables and mutules. There is a single storey, and three ranges with seven bays. The gable end faces the street and contains two round-headed sash windows with moulded surrounds. On the west front are triple lancet windows, sash windows, a casement window, a circular window, and an open timber arcade. To the right is a projecting single-storey extension, and behind are two small wings.	II
St Luke's Church; 53.32251°N 1.17019°W		1861–63	The church was designed by T. C. Hine and Robert Evans in Decorated style. It is built in stone with roofs of slate and slab, and consists of a nave with a clerestory, north and south aisles, north and south porches, north and south transepts, an apsidal chancel, and a tower at the crossing with a circular stair turret to the east. The tower has three stages, two string courses, lancet windows, clock faces, double lancet bell openings, four gargoyles, and a coped parapet. The boundary wall is in stone with rounded coping, and contains two wrought iron gates, one with chamfered square piers, and both with pyramidal caps.	II
War memorial 53.32242°N 1.17059°W		1920	The war memorial in the corner of the churchyard of St Luke's Church was designed by C. E. Kempe and company. It consists of a wooden calvary with a bronze figure of Christ, on an octagonal stone plinth, on an octagonal base, in a flagged area. On the base is a quatrefoil decoration on each face, and on the plinth are bronze panels with inscriptions and the names of those lost in the two World Wars.	II
