= Surveyor General of Woods, Forests, Parks, and Chases =

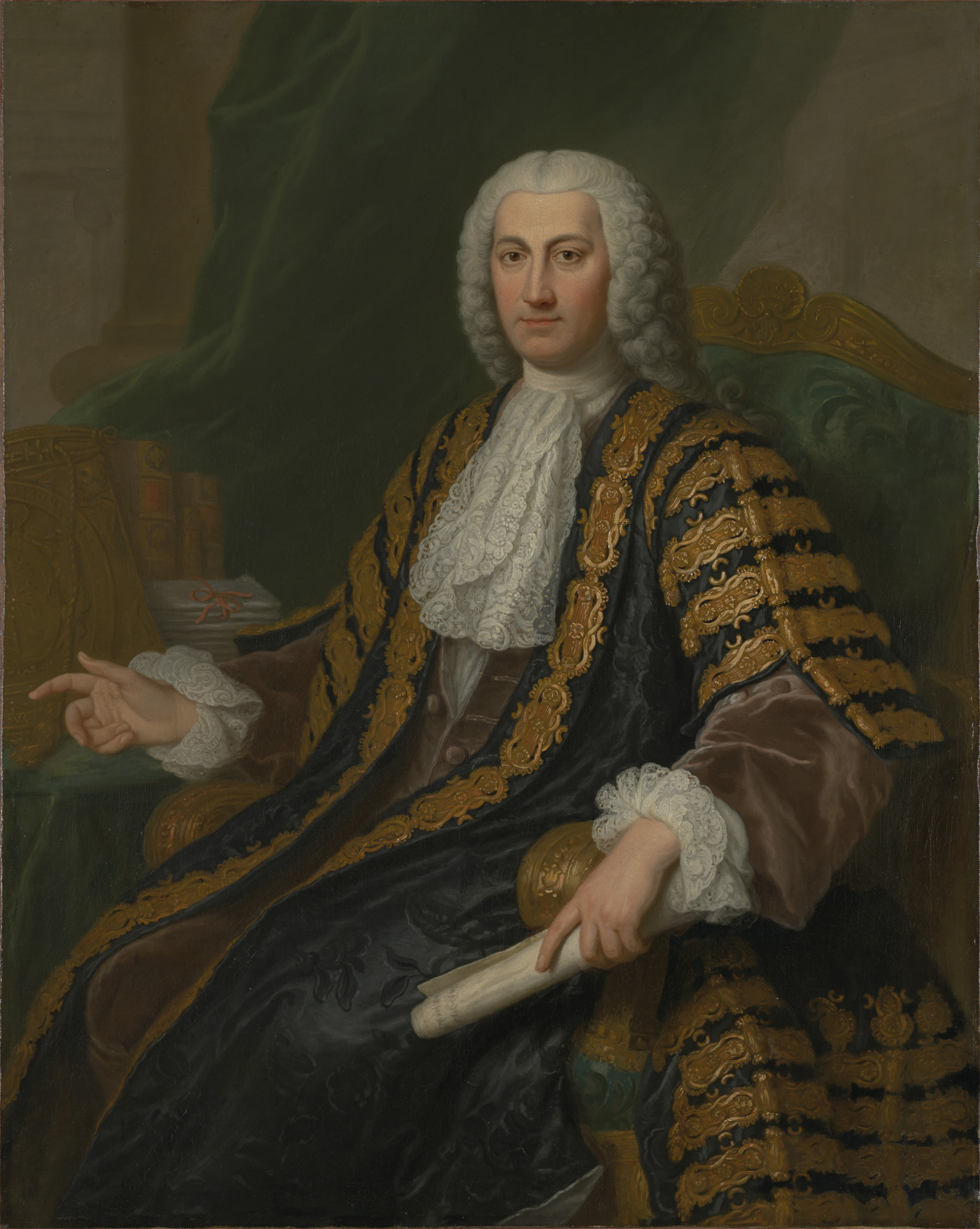
Henry Legge, Surveyor General of Woods, Forests, Parks, and Chases,1742–45

The post of Surveyor General of Woods, Forests, Parks and Chases was an office under the English (later the United Kingdom) Crown, charged with the management of Crown lands. At one time, the office was divided between surveyors south and north of the River Trent, but in the 18th century, the two posts were combined. In 1810, by the Crown Lands Act 1810 (50 Geo. 3. c. 65), later amended by the Crown Lands Act 1829 (10 Geo. 4. c. 50), the functions of the post were merged with those of the Surveyor General of the Land Revenues of the Crown and became the responsibility of a new body, the Commissioners of Woods, Forests and Land Revenues.

== Surveyors General of Woods, Forests, Parks and Chases ==
- 1551-82 Roger Tavener - surveyor or deputy surveyor south of Trent
- c.1582--1610 John Taverner
- 1610 Robert Tresswell, John Norden and John Thorpe (jointly)
- 16— Robert Tresswell
- 16— Andrew Tresswell
- 1667 — Tresswell
- 1667 Thomas Agar & John Madden (jointly)
- 1680 Thomas Agar & Charles Strode (jointly)
- 1688 Philip Riley
- 1701 Thomas Hewett
- 1702 Edward Wilcox
- 1714 Thomas Hewett
- 1716 Edward Younge
- 1720 Charles Withers
- 1736 Francis Whitworth
- 1742 Henry Legge
- 1745 John Phillipson
- 1756 John Pitt
- 1763 Sir Edmond Thomas
- 1767 John Pitt
- 1786 John Robinson
- 1803 Sylvester Douglas, 1st Baron Glenbervie
- 1806 Lord Robert Spencer
- 1807 Sylvester Douglas, 1st Baron Glenbervie
