= RAF Bircotes =

Royal Air Force base in Yorkshire, England

RAF Bircotes
- Near Bircotes, Nottinghamshire in England

Site information
- Type: Royal Air Force satellite station
- Code: BR
- Owner: Air Ministry
- Operator: Royal Air Force
- Controlled by: RAF Bomber Command * No. 7 (T) Group RAF * No. 93 (OTU) Group RAF

Location
- Shown within South Yorkshire RAF Bircotes (the United Kingdom)
- Coordinates: 53°26′08″N 001°02′31″W

Site history
- Built: 1941
- In use: November 1941 - July 1948
- Battles/wars: European theatre of World War II

Airfield information
- Elevation: 110 feet (34 m) AMSL
Runways
Direction	Length and surface
NW/SE	1,235 metres (4,052 ft) Grass
09/27	1,400 metres (4,593 ft) Grass
18/36	1,410 metres (4,626 ft) Grass

Royal Air Force Bircotes or more simply RAF Bircotes is a former Royal Air Force satellite station located within South Yorkshire, England. Although it was named after the village of Bircotes which is in Nottinghamshire.

== History ==
RAF Bircotes was located next the No. 1 Group RAF, RAF Bomber Command HQ at RAF Bawtry, Bawtry Hall, Bawtry, England. The airfield consisted of a grass strip with a connecting perimeter track with T2, B1 and Bessonneau hangars plus other miscellaneous buildings.

The Airfield opened in late 1941 and was used by the Avro Ansons, Vickers Wellingtons, and Avro Manchesters from No. 25 Operational Training Unit RAF (OTU) at nearby RAF Finningley.

A variety of training units occupied the airfield including two operational Training units:

- Satellite for No. 18 OTU (March 1943 - November 1944)
- Satellite for No. 28 OTU (June - July 1944)
- Satellite for No. 82 OTU (August - October 1943)
- Satellite for No. 16 (Polish) Service Flying Training School RAF (February - August 1943)
- Sub site for No. 35 Maintenance Unit RAF (November 1944 - 1945)

The No. 1 Group Communication Flight RAF from RAF Bawtry were also present at Bircotes from April 1941. The unit had moved from RAF Hucknall and at Bircotes the unit was using Miles Masters, Airspeed Oxfords, Miles Martinets, Curtiss Tomahawks and Westland Lysanders.

Towards the end of the Second World War and afterwards a number of different units used the airfield such as No. 250 Maintenance Unit RAF (MU) which formed at the airfield while under the control of RAF Maintenance Command and No. 61 MU which absorbed No. 250 MU and used Bircotes as a sub site between 1944 and 1948.

== Current use ==
The airfield is currently farmland after being decommissioned on 13 July 1948 with little of the perimeter track left.
