= Thomas Hewet =

English landowner and architect (1656–1726)

Sir Thomas Hewet or Hewett FRS (9 September c. 1656/1658 – 9 April 1726) was an English architect, surveyor and landowner.

== Life ==
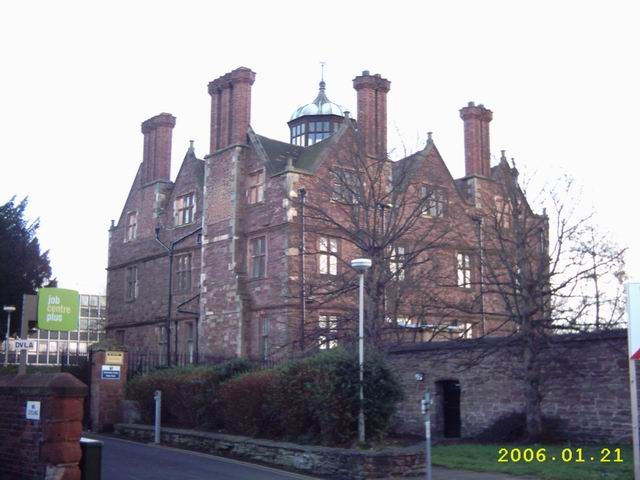
Whitehall, the Prynce residence in Shrewsbury

=== Origins and education ===
Thomas was the son of William Hewet of Shireoaks Hall, Nottinghamshire, and his wife Mary, second daughter of Sir Richard Prynce the younger (1598–1665) of Abbey Foregate in Shrewsbury.

William, his father, died at about the same time as his grandfather, Sir Thomas Hewett of Shireoaks Hall, who died in 1660. Thomas, therefore, became the heir to his father's estate, including Shireoaks, at four years of age, but had to await his full majority before coming into possession of it. Meanwhile, he was educated at Shrewsbury School and Christ Church, Oxford, matriculating in 1676 and studying for about four years.

Next, he became an officer of the Yeomen of the Guard to King Charles II, and after a term of service he spent about five years travelling on the continent of Europe, visiting France, Holland, Switzerland, Germany and Italy.

=== Marriage ===
In Geneva in 1689 he married Frances, daughter of Richard Betenson (1602–1679) of Scadbury (near Chislehurst) in Kent by Albinia Wray, daughter and coheir of Sir Christopher Wray (MP) and Albinia Cecil, daughter of Edward Cecil, 1st Viscount Wimbledon. Frances Wray, aunt of Mrs Hewett, was the widow of Sir Henry Vane the Younger. Thomas Hewett returned to England with her, having developed eccentricities including a taste for atheism, to become master of his estates. A collection of letters written to Frances Hewett by Mary Pierrepoint (afterwards Lady Mary Wortley Montagu) around 1710–1717 survives.

=== Offices and works ===
He became an architect and won some valuable clients. He built a library in Piccadilly for Charles Spencer, 3rd Earl of Sunderland and advised Thomas Parker, 1st Earl of Macclesfield on the restoration of Shirburn Castle, Oxfordshire. He was appointed Surveyor-General of Woods in 1701 and 1714. A correspondence of 1708–1711 with the Duke of Newcastle survives. In 1719, the year in which he was knighted, Sunderland recommended him for the position of Surveyor of the King's Works based at the Tower of London. He was elected a Fellow of the Royal Society in 1721.

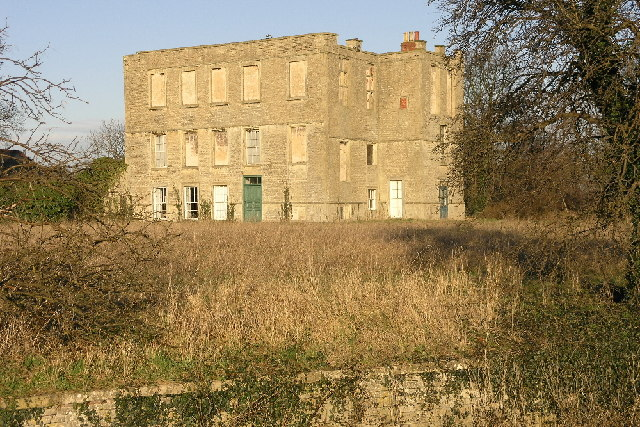
Shireoaks Hall, the Hewett residence near Worksop

=== The Shireoaks estate ===
At his family seat, Shireoaks Hall, he carried out major renovations and improvements, remodelling the front, adding a wing and creating avenues and a water garden. The work was not entirely complete at his death in 1726, but he willed funds for its completion. "Whereas I have begun the building of the house in the wood called Scratoe and also have designed to make severall Cutts and other ornaments in and about the said Wood according to a draught and design I have made and drawn thereof", he, therefore, empowers his trustees to draw rents from his estate sufficient to complete the work in case he should die before it is finished. To this he immediately adds that if he dies near Worksop he wishes to be buried in the chancel of the church at Wales, Yorkshire, "in such manner as I shall direct by a note in writing". There he has a monument with an informative inscription.

=== Legacy ===
He left Shireoaks to be occupied by Dame Frances for her lifetime, with an annuity of £405, all held by trustees who were to ensure that she maintained a rigid discipline of maintenance for the estate including the keeping of 200 deer in the park, or else to forfeit her lifetime right if she failed to keep these terms closely, or in any detail challenged them.

The estate was to descend to his godson, John Thornhaugh, of Osberton, reputedly because his only daughter had run off with a fortune-teller. Dame Frances long overlived Sir Thomas, returning to her birthplace of London where she died on 31 January 1756, aged 88. At her own request, she was buried beside her husband in the church at Wales. An old tale that he had been buried near his banqueting-house in the woods is almost certainly apocryphal.

== Sources ==
- "Sir Thomas Hewet (1656-1726)". Rotherham Web. Archived from the original on 22 July 2012.
- "Hamlets in the Parish of Worksop:Shireoaks". Nottinghamshire History.
- "Shireoaks Hall" (PDF). Archived from the original (PDF) on 30 August 2012.
