= Beckingham (Bassetlaw electoral ward) =

Electoral division in the East Midlands, England

- Electoral ward
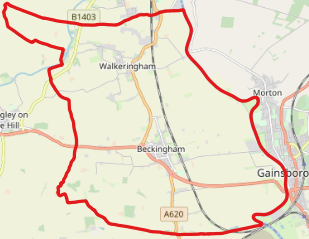
- Electorate: 1,901 (2019)
- District: Bassetlaw
- Region: East Midlands
- Country: England
- Sovereign state: United Kingdom
- Postcode district: DN10
- UK Parliament: Bassetlaw
- Councillors: 1

Beckingham is an electoral ward in the district of Bassetlaw. The ward elects one councillor to Bassetlaw District Council using the first past the post electoral system for a four-year term in office. The number of registered voters in the ward is 1,901 as of 2019.

It consists of the civil parishes of Beckingham, Walkeringham and Saundby.

The ward was created in 1979 following a review of ward boundaries in Bassetlaw by the Local Government Boundary Commission for England. A subsequent review of electoral arrangements in 2002 resulted in minor changes to the boundaries of the ward, namely the transfer of Bole and West Burton from the ward.

== Councillors ==
Interactive map of ward boundaries.

The ward elects one councillor every four years. Prior to 2015, Bassetlaw District Council was elected by thirds with elections taking place every year except the year in which elections to Nottinghamshire County Council took place.

Election	Councillor
1979	J. Green (Conservative)
1980	D. Weir (Labour)
1984	C. Johnson (Conservative)
1988	C. Johnson (Conservative)
1992	Kenneth Bullivant (Conservative)
1996	Kenneth Bullivant (Conservative)
2000	Kenneth Bullivant (Conservative)
2002	Kenneth Bullivant (Conservative)
2004	Kenneth Bullivant (Conservative)
2008	Kenneth Bullivant (Conservative)
2012	Joan Sanger (Independent)
2015	Joan Sanger (Independent)
2019	Joan Sanger (Independent)
2023	Joan Sanger (Independent)

== Elections ==
=== 2023 ===
Beckingham (1)
Party	Candidate	Votes	%	±%
Independent	Joan Sanger (inc)	447	59.0%	▼14.1%
Conservative	April Hayman	310	41.0%	▲14.1%
Turnout		760	36.9%	
Independent hold		Swing		

=== 2019 ===
Beckingham (1) 2 May 2019
Party	Candidate	Votes	%	±%
Independent	Joan Sanger*	558	73.1%	▲33.4
Conservative	Raymond Simpson	205	26.9%	▼5.0
Turnout			41%	
Independent hold		Swing		

=== 2015 ===
Beckingham (1) 7 May 2015
Party	Candidate	Votes	%	±%
Independent	Joan Sanger	533	39.7%	
Conservative	Raymond Simpson	428	31.9%	
UKIP	Diana Capp	232	17.3%	
Labour	Alec Freeman	148	11%	
Turnout			72.6%	
Independent hold		Swing		

=== 2012 ===
Beckingham (1) 3 May 2012
Party	Candidate	Votes	%	±%
Independent	Joan Sanger	258	38.6%	
Independent	Raymond Simpson	163	24.4%	
Conservative	Simon Taylor	153	22.9%	
Labour	Phillip Goodliffe	95	14.2%	
Turnout			36.4%	
Independent gain from Conservative		Swing		

=== 2008 ===
Beckingham (1) 1 May 2008
Party	Candidate	Votes	%	±%
Conservative	Kenneth Bullivant	518	70.4%	
Labour	Joan Sanger	218	29.6%	
Turnout			35.2%	

=== 2004 ===
Beckingham (1) 10 June 2004
Party	Candidate	Votes	%	±%
Conservative	Kenneth Bullivant	610	67.5%	
Labour	Joan Sanger	294	32.5%	
Turnout				
