= Sutton (Bassetlaw electoral ward) =

- Electoral ward
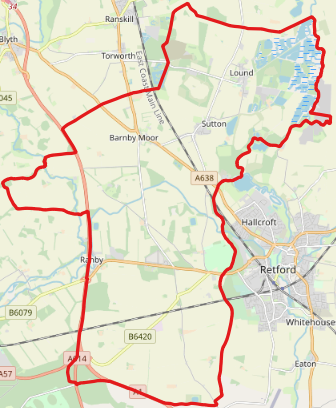
- Electorate: 1,670 (2019)
- District: Bassetlaw
- Region: East Midlands
- Country: England
- Sovereign state: United Kingdom
- Postcode district: DN22
- UK Parliament: Bassetlaw
- Councillors: 1

Sutton is an electoral ward in the district of Bassetlaw. The ward elects one councillor to Bassetlaw District Council using the first past the post electoral system for a four-year term in office. The number of registered voters in the ward is 1,670 as of 2019.

It consists of the villages of Babworth, Barnby Moor, Sutton cum Lound and Lound.

The ward was created in 2002 following a review of electoral boundaries in Bassetlaw by the Boundary Committee for England.

== Councillors ==
Interactive map of ward boundaries.

The ward elects one councillor every four years. Prior to 2015, Bassetlaw District Council was elected by thirds with elections taking place every year except the year in which elections to Nottinghamshire County Council took place.

Election	Councillor
2002	Alan Kitchen (Liberal Democrats)
2003 by-election	Liz Yates (Conservative)
2004	Liz Yates (Conservative)
2008	Liz Yates (Conservative)
2012	Tracey Taylor (Conservative)
2015	Tracey Taylor (Conservative)
2019	Rob Boeuf (Independent)
2021 by-election	Denise Depledge (Conservative)
2022 by-election	Darrell Pulk (Labour)
2023	Darrell Pulk (Labour)

== Elections ==
=== 2023 ===
Sutton (1)
Party	Candidate	Votes	%	±%
Labour	Darrell Pulk (inc)	409	58.3%	▲46.3%
Conservative	Tracey Taylor	292	41.7%	▲15.3%
Turnout		706	42.3%	
Labour gain from Independent		Swing		

=== 2022 by-election ===
A by-election was held on 24 November 2022 due to the resignation of Denise Depledge (Conservative)

Sutton (1) 24 November 2022
Party	Candidate	Votes	%	±%
Labour	Darrell Pulk	301	55.9%	▲35.7
Conservative	Fraser McFarland	224	41.6%	▼22.0
Liberal Democrats	Phil Ray	13	2.4%	▼13.7
Turnout			32.9%	
Labour gain from Conservative		Swing		

=== 2021 by-election ===
A by-election was held on 6 May 2021 due to the resignation of Rob Boeuf (Independent).

Sutton (1) 6 May 2021
Party	Candidate	Votes	%	±%
Conservative	Denise Depledge	422	63.7%	
Labour	Laura Sanders	134	20.2%	
Liberal Democrats	Richard Harris	107	16.1%	
Turnout		670	40.1%	
Conservative gain from Independent		Swing		

=== 2019 ===
Sutton (1) 2 May 2019
Party	Candidate	Votes	%	±%
Independent	Rob Boeuf	381	61.7%	N/A
Conservative	Emma Auckland	163	26.4%	▼39.6
Labour	Gary Moore	74	12%	▼13.7
Turnout		627	37.5%	
Independent gain from Conservative		Swing		

=== 2015 ===
Sutton (1) 7 May 2015
Party	Candidate	Votes	%	±%
Conservative	Tracey Taylor	774	66.0%	
Labour	Rebecca Leigh	302	25.7%	
Liberal Democrats	Peter Thompson	97	8.3%	
Turnout			70.8%	
Conservative hold		Swing		

=== 2012 ===
Sutton (1) 3 May 2012
Party	Candidate	Votes	%	±%
Conservative	Tracey Taylor	340	67.6%	
Labour	Tony Brown	163	32.4%	
Turnout			30.9%	
Conservative hold		Swing		

=== 2008 ===
Sutton (1) 1 May 2008
Party	Candidate	Votes	%	±%
Conservative	Liz Yates (elected unopposed)	N/A	N/A	N/A
Turnout		N/A	N/A	

=== 2004 ===
Sutton (1) 10 June 2004
Party	Candidate	Votes	%	±%
Conservative	Liz Yates	572	75.1%	
Liberal Democrats	Geoffrey Chapman	190	24.9%	
Turnout		762		

=== 2003 by-election ===
A by-election was held on 18 September 2003.

Sutton (1) 18 September 2003
Party	Candidate	Votes	%	±%
Conservative	Liz Yates	335	87.5%	
Labour		48	12.5%	
Turnout		383	24.1%	

=== 2002 ===
Sutton (1) 2 May 2002
Party	Candidate	Votes	%	±%
Liberal Democrats	Alan Kitchen	461	70.5%	
Conservative	Liz Yates	193	29.5%	
Turnout		656	41.4%	
Liberal Democrats win (new seat)				
