= Rampton (Bassetlaw electoral ward) =

- Electoral ward
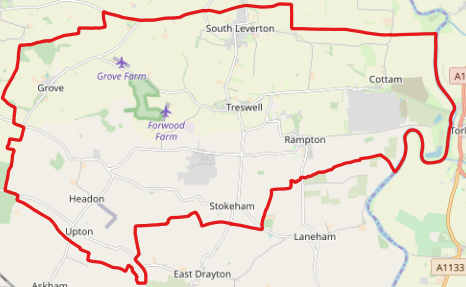
- Electorate: 1,689 (2019)
- District: Bassetlaw
- Region: East Midlands
- Country: England
- Sovereign state: United Kingdom
- Postcode district: DN22
- UK Parliament: Newark
- Councillors: 1

Rampton is an electoral ward in the district of Bassetlaw. The ward elects one councillor to Bassetlaw District Council using the first past the post electoral system for a four-year term in office. The number of registered voters in the ward is 1,689 as of 2019.

It consists of the villages of Cottam, Grove, Headon cum Upton, Rampton, Stokeham, South Leverton and Treswell.

The ward was created in 1979 following a review of ward boundaries in Bassetlaw by the Local Government Boundary Commission for England. A subsequent review of electoral arrangements in 2002 resulted in minor changes to the boundaries of the ward.

== Councillors ==
Interactive map of ward boundaries.

The ward elects one councillor every four years. Prior to 2015, Bassetlaw District Council was elected by thirds with elections taking place every year except the year in which elections to Nottinghamshire County Council took place.

Election	Councillor
1979	Jeff Rickells (Conservative)
1983	Jeff Rickells (Conservative)
1987	Jeff Rickells (Conservative)
1991	Jeff Rickells (Conservative)
1995	Jeff Rickells (Conservative)
1999	Jeff Rickells (Conservative)
2002†	Jeff Rickells (Conservative)
2003	Jeff Rickells (Conservative)
2007	Jeff Rickells (Conservative)
2011	Jeff Rickells (Conservative)
2015	Marie Critchley (Conservative)
2019	Anthony Coultate (Conservative)
2023	Anthony Coultate (Conservative)

† Minor changes to ward boundaries.

== Elections ==
=== 2023 ===
Rampton (1)
Party	Candidate	Votes	%	±%
Conservative	Anthony Coultate (inc)	381	70.6%	▼1.4%
Labour	Joe Butler	159	29.4%	▲1.4%
Turnout		547	32.7%	
Conservative hold		Swing		

=== 2019 ===
Rampton (1) 2 May 2019
Party	Candidate	Votes	%	±%
Conservative	Anthony Coultate	372	72.0%	▲2.6
Labour	Raymond Fielding	145	28.0%	▼2.6
Turnout		550	32.6%	
Registered electors		1,689		
Conservative hold		Swing		

=== 2015 ===
Rampton (1) 7 May 2015
Party	Candidate	Votes	%	±%
Conservative	Marie Critchley	791	69.4%	
Labour	Vicky Rowbotham	349	30.6%	
Turnout			71.6%	
Conservative hold		Swing		

=== 2011 ===
Rampton (1) 5 May 2011
Party	Candidate	Votes	%	±%
Conservative	Jeff Rickells	573	70.4%	
Labour	Pam Skelding	241	29.6%	
Turnout		814	50.8%	
Registered electors		1,613		

=== 2007 ===
Rampton (1) 3 May 2007
Party	Candidate	Votes	%	±%
Conservative	Jeff Rickells (elected unopposed)	N/A	N/A	N/A
Turnout		N/A	N/A	
Registered electors		1,647		

=== 2003 ===
Rampton (1) 1 May 2003
Party	Candidate	Votes	%	±%
Conservative	Jeff Rickells (elected unopposed)	N/A	N/A	N/A
Turnout		N/A	N/A	
Registered electors		1,607		

=== 2002 ===
Rampton (1) 2 May 2002
Party	Candidate	Votes	%	±%
Conservative	Jeff Rickells (elected unopposed)	N/A	N/A	N/A
Turnout		N/A	N/A	
Registered electors		1,618		
