= Tuxford and Trent (Bassetlaw electoral ward) =

- Electoral ward
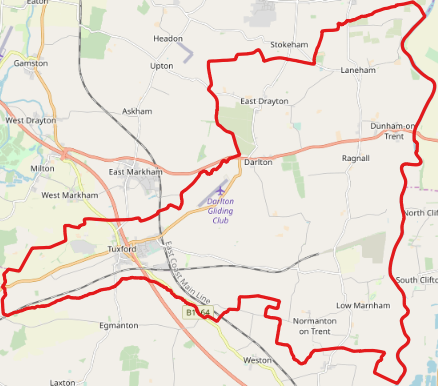
- Electorate: 3,489 (2019)
- District: Bassetlaw
- Region: East Midlands
- Country: England
- Sovereign state: United Kingdom
- Postcode district: DN22
- Postcode district: NG22
- UK Parliament: Newark
- Councillors: 2

Tuxford and Trent is an electoral ward in the district of Bassetlaw. The ward elects two councillors to Bassetlaw District Council using the first past the post electoral system, with each councillor serving a four-year term in office. The number of registered voters in the ward is 3,489 as of 2019.

It consists of the market town of Tuxford and the villages of Darlton, Dunham-on-Trent, East Drayton, Fledborough, Laneham, Marnham, Normanton on Trent and Ragnall.

The ward was created in 2002 following a review of electoral boundaries in Bassetlaw by the Boundary Committee for England.

== Councillors ==
Interactive map of ward boundaries.

The ward elects 2 councillors every four years. Prior to 2015, Bassetlaw District Council was elected by thirds with elections taking place every year except the year in which elections to Nottinghamshire County Council took place.

Election	Councillor	Councillor
2002	Keith Isard (Conservative)	Robert Sutton (Conservative)
2004	Keith Isard (Conservative)	Michael Jenkins (Conservative)
2006	Keith Isard (Conservative)	Michael Jenkins (Conservative)
2008	Keith Isard (Conservative)	Shirley Isard (Conservative)
2010	Keith Isard (Conservative)	Shirley Isard (Conservative)
2012	Keith Isard (Conservative)	Shirley Isard (Conservative)
2014	Keith Isard (Conservative)	Shirley Isard (Conservative)
2015	Keith Isard (Conservative)	Shirley Isard (Conservative)
2019	Keith Isard (Conservative)	Shirley Isard (Conservative)
2021 by-election	Lewis Stanniland (Conservative)	Shirley Isard (Conservative)
2023	Lewis Stanniland (Conservative)	Emma Griffin (Conservative)

== Elections ==
=== 2023 ===
Tuxford and Trent (2)
Party	Candidate	Votes	%	±%
Conservative	Emma Griffin	666	49.3%	▲5.8%
Conservative	Lewis Stanniland (inc)	595		
Labour	Ian Warton-Woods	389	28.8%	▲9.2%
Green	Denise Taylor-Roome	297	22.0%	NEW
Turnout		1,110	31.3%	
Conservative hold		Swing		
Conservative hold		Swing		

=== 2021 by-election ===
A by-election was held on 6 May 2021 due to the resignation of Keith Isard (Conservative).

Tuxford and Trent (1) 6 May 2021
Party	Candidate	Votes	%	±%
Conservative	Lewis Stanniland	745	57.7%	
Labour	David Naylor	472	36.5%	
Liberal Democrats	James Nixon	75	5.8%	
Turnout		1,303	37.6%	
Registered electors		3,464		

=== 2019 ===
Tuxford and Trent (2) 2 May 2019
Party	Candidate	Votes	%	±%
Conservative	Keith Isard*	453	43.5%	▼18.9%
Conservative	Shirley Isard*	412		
Independent	Matt Richards	385	36.9%	N/A
Labour	Rebecca Littler-Leigh	204	19.6%	▼18%
Labour	Michael Ouzman	159		
Turnout		974	27.9%	
Registered electors		3,489		
Conservative hold		Swing		
Conservative hold		Swing		

=== 2015 ===
Tuxford and Trent (2) 7 May 2015
Party	Candidate	Votes	%	±%
Conservative	Keith Isard	1,341	62.4%	
Conservative	Shirley Isard	1,191		
Labour	Michelle Gregory	807	37.6%	
Labour	Ross Moloney	782		
Turnout			67.9%	
Conservative hold		Swing		
Conservative hold		Swing		

=== 2014 ===
Tuxford and Trent (1) 22 May 2014
Party	Candidate	Votes	%	±%
Conservative	Keith Isard	562	41.7%	
Labour	Ross Moloney	443	32.9%	
UKIP	Trevor Fisher	343	25.4%	
Turnout				

=== 2012 ===
Tuxford and Trent (1) 3 May 2012
Party	Candidate	Votes	%	±%
Conservative	Shirley Isard	543	52.0%	
Labour	Andy Jee	502	48.0%	
Turnout			31.6%	
Registered electors		3,340		
Conservative hold		Swing		

=== 2010 ===
Tuxford and Trent (1) 6 May 2010
Party	Candidate	Votes	%	±%
Conservative	Keith Isard	1,264	57.4%	
Labour	Bert Hunt	937	42.6%	
Turnout		2,201	65.5%	
Registered electors		3,424		
Conservative hold		Swing		

=== 2008 ===
Tuxford and Trent (1) 1 May 2008
Party	Candidate	Votes	%	±%
Conservative	Shirley Isard	756	71.6%	
Labour	Marilyn McCarthy	300	28.4%	
Turnout		1,056	31.5%	
Registered electors		3,390		

=== 2006 ===
Tuxford and Trent (1) 4 May 2006
Party	Candidate	Votes	%	±%
Conservative	Keith Isard	803	73.1%	
Labour	Pamela Skelding	295	26.9%	
Turnout			33.8%	
Registered electors		3,301		

=== 2004 ===
Tuxford and Trent (1) 10 June 2004
Party	Candidate	Votes	%	±%
Conservative	Michael Jenkins	675	46.8%	
Labour	Albert Hunt	407	28.2%	
Liberal Democrats	Peter Lock	362	25.1%	
Turnout		1,444	45.8%	
Registered electors		3,181		

=== 2002 ===
Tuxford and Trent (2) 2 May 2002
Party	Candidate	Votes	%	±%
Conservative	Keith Isard	761	58.2%	
Conservative	Robert Sutton	729		
Labour	John Hobart	398	30.4%	
Labour	Carol Gee	275		
Liberal Democrats	Philip Lewis	149	11.4%	
Turnout		1,232	39.3%	
Registered electors		3,136		
Conservative win (new seat)				
Conservative win (new seat)				
