= Blyth (Bassetlaw electoral ward) =

- Electoral ward
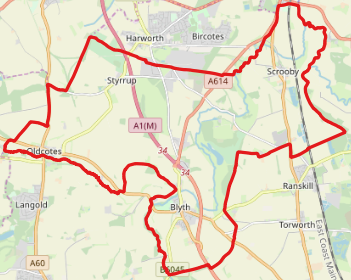
- Electorate: 1,862 (2019)
- District: Bassetlaw
- Region: East Midlands
- Country: England
- Sovereign state: United Kingdom
- Postcode district: S81
- Postcode district: DN10
- UK Parliament: Bassetlaw
- Councillors: 1

Blyth is an electoral ward in the district of Bassetlaw. The ward elects one councillor to Bassetlaw District Council using the first past the post electoral system for a four-year term in office. The number of registered voters in the ward is 1,862 as of 2019.

It consists of the civil parishes of Blyth, Scrooby and Styrrup with Oldcotes.

The ward was created in 1979 following a review of ward boundaries in Bassetlaw by the Local Government Boundary Commission for England. A subsequent review of electoral arrangements in 2002 resulted in minor changes to the boundaries of the ward, although the number of councillors remained the same.

== Councillors ==
Interactive map of ward boundaries.

The ward elects one councillor every four years. Prior to 2015, Bassetlaw District Council was elected by thirds with elections taking place every year except the year in which elections to Nottinghamshire County Council took place.

Election	Councillor
1979	G. Earle (Independent 1979-1991) (Conservative 1991-1995)
1983	G. Earle (Independent 1979-1991) (Conservative 1991-1995)
1987	G. Earle (Independent 1979-1991) (Conservative 1991-1995)
1991	G. Earle (Independent 1979-1991) (Conservative 1991-1995)
1995	J. Healey (Independent)
1999	J. Harris (Conservative)
2002	Terry Yates (Conservative)
2003	Terry Yates (Conservative)
2007	Terry Yates (Conservative)
2011	Barry Bowles (Conservative)
2015	Barry Bowles (Conservative)
2019	Jack Bowker (Labour)
2023	Jack Bowker (Labour)

== Elections ==
=== 2023 ===
Blyth (1)
Party	Candidate	Votes	%	±%
Labour	Jack Bowker (inc)	430	58.2%	▲20.1%
Conservative	Donald Clarke	309	41.8%	▲7.2%
Turnout		744	39.8%	
Labour hold		Swing		

=== 2019 ===
Blyth (1) 2 May 2019
Party	Candidate	Votes	%	±%
Labour	Jack Bowker	261	38.1%	▲3.5
Conservative	Barry Bowles*	237	34.6%	▼9.6
UKIP	John Hudson	124	18.1%	▲1.6
Liberal Democrats	Peter Thompson	63	9.2%	▲4.5
Turnout			37.2%	
Labour gain from Conservative		Swing		

=== 2015 ===
Blyth (1) 7 May 2015
Party	Candidate	Votes	%	±%
Conservative	Barry Bowles	556	44.2%	
Labour	Bill Barker	435	34.6%	
UKIP	Roger Vernon	208	16.5%	
Liberal Democrats	Leon Duveen	58	4.6%	
Turnout			69.8%	
Conservative hold		Swing		

=== 2011 ===
Blyth (1) 5 May 2011
Party	Candidate	Votes	%	±%
Conservative	Barry Bowles	363	45.4%	
Labour	Grace Pengelly	288	36%	
Liberal Democrats	Peter Thompson	149	18.6%	
Turnout			44.4%	

=== 2007 ===
Blyth (1) 3 May 2007
Party	Candidate	Votes	%	±%
Conservative	Terry Yates	509	74.7%	
Labour	Peter Abell	172	25.3%	
Turnout			38.4%	

=== 2003 ===
Blyth (1) 1 May 2003
Party	Candidate	Votes	%	±%
Conservative	Terry Yates	365	66.5%	
Liberal Democrats	Mark Hunter	184	33.5%	
Turnout			30.8%	
