= Ranskill (Bassetlaw electoral ward) =

- Electoral ward
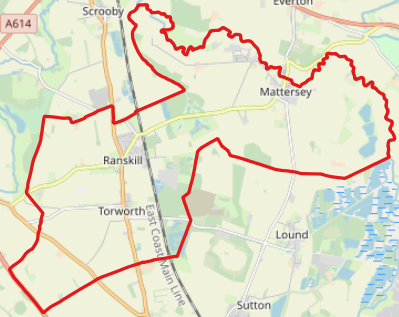
- Electorate: 1,859 (2019)
- District: Bassetlaw
- Region: East Midlands
- Country: England
- Sovereign state: United Kingdom
- Postcode district: DN10
- Postcode district: DN22
- UK Parliament: Bassetlaw
- Councillors: 1

Ranskill is an electoral ward in the district of Bassetlaw. The ward elects one councillor to Bassetlaw District Council using the first past the post electoral system for a four-year term in office. The number of registered voters in the ward is 1,859 as of 2019.

It consists of the villages of Ranskill, Torworth and Mattersey.

The ward was created in 1979 following a review of ward boundaries in Bassetlaw by the Local Government Boundary Commission for England. A subsequent review of electoral arrangements in 2002 resulted in minor changes to the boundaries of the ward.

== Councillors ==
Interactive map of ward boundaries.

The ward elects one councillor every four years. Prior to 2015, Bassetlaw District Council was elected by thirds with elections taking place every year except the year in which elections to Nottinghamshire County Council took place.

Election	Councillor
1979	S. Scholey (Conservative)
1982	G. Berry (Conservative)
1986	G. Berry (Conservative)
1990	B. Simcox (Conservative)
1994	Sean Kerrigan (Liberal Democrats)
1998	Sean Kerrigan (Liberal Democrats)
2002	Sean Kerrigan (Liberal Democrats)
2003	Sean Kerrigan (Liberal Democrats)
2007	Michael Gray (Conservative)
2011	Michael Gray (Conservative)
2015	Michael Gray (Conservative)
2019	Paul Nicholls (Labour)
2021 by-election	Gerald Bowers (Conservative)
2023	David Bamford (Conservative)

== Elections ==
=== 2023 ===
Ranskill (1)
Party	Candidate	Votes	%	±%
Conservative	David Bamford	393	56.5%	▲27.5%
Labour	Andy Jee	302	43.5%	▲4.0%
Turnout		704	36.5%	
Conservative gain from Labour		Swing		

=== 2021 by-election ===
A by-election was held on 6 May 2021 due to the resignation of Paul Nicholls (Labour).

Ranskill (1) 6 May 2021
Party	Candidate	Votes	%	±%
Conservative	Gerald Bowers	454	63.0%	▲34
Independent	Michael Gray	193	26.8%	▲2
Liberal Democrats	Leon Duveen	74	10.3	▲4
Turnout		728	38.7%	▲0.5
Conservative gain from Labour		Swing		

=== 2019 ===
Ranskill (1) 2 May 2019
Party	Candidate	Votes	%	±%
Labour	Paul Nicholls	278	39.5%	▲15%
Conservative	Beverley Fear	204	29%	▼34%
Independent	Michael Gray*	177	25.1%	N/A
Liberal Democrats	Mark Hunter	45	6.4%	▼6.1%
Turnout		710	38.2%	
Labour gain from Conservative		Swing		

=== 2015 ===
Ranskill (1) 7 May 2015
Party	Candidate	Votes	%	±%
Conservative	Michael Gray	789	63.0%	
Labour	Audrey Samuel	307	24.5%	
Liberal Democrats	Mark Hunter	156	12.5%	
Turnout			67.7%	
Conservative hold		Swing		

=== 2011 ===
Ranskill (1) 5 May 2011
Party	Candidate	Votes	%	±%
Conservative	Michael Gray	441	51.1%	
Labour	Aidan Mann	369	42.8%	
Liberal Democrats	Mark Hunter	53	6.1%	
Turnout		863	47.0%	

=== 2007 ===
Ranskill (1) 3 May 2007
Party	Candidate	Votes	%	±%
Conservative	Michael Gray	392	57.2%	
Labour	Viv Thomas	152	22.2%	
Liberal Democrats	Mark Hunter	141	20.6%	
Turnout		685	38.2%	

=== 2003 ===
Ranskill (1) 1 May 2003
Party	Candidate	Votes	%	±%
Liberal Democrats	Sean Kerrigan	350	58.6%	
Conservative	Elizabeth Yates	247	41.4%	
Turnout		597	33.9%	
