= 2027 Bassetlaw District Council election =

Local election in England

- 6 May 2026

All 48 seats to Bassetlaw District Council 25 seats needed for a majority

	First party	Second party	Third party
Leader	Julie Leigh	Fraser McFarland	Emma Griffin
Party	Labour	Reform	Conservative
Leader's seat	Worksop South	Clayworth	Tuxford and Trent
Last election	38	0	8
Seats before	34	7	3
Leader before election
Julie Leigh
Labour
Leader after election
TBD

The 2027 Bassetlaw District Council election will take place on 6 May 2027, to elect all 48 members of Bassetlaw District Council in England. This will be on the same day as other local elections held across the United Kingdom.

== Background ==
Bassetlaw is one of the seven non-metropolitan districts that make up Nottinghamshire County Council. The district has consistently elected Labour majorities since its creation, aside from a period between 2004 and 2011. The 2023 election — the third since the district moved to all-out elections in 2015 — saw Labour winning 38 seats, the Conservatives winning 8, and independents winning 2.

=== Local government reorganisation ===
Bassetlaw is one of the districts planned to be abolished as part of upcoming structural changes to local government in England. The district is expected to form part of the Nottinghamshire unitary authority.

Initial plans for the reorganisation scheduled elections for the unitary authorities in May 2027 which entailed Bassetlaw's election being cancelled. Following the receipt of legal advice the Ministry of Housing, Communities and Local Government confirmed that the 2027 elections would take place on current local government boundaries.

== Previous council composition ==
After 2023 election		Before 2027 election	
Party	Seats	Party	Seats
Labour	38	Labour	34
Reform	0	Reform	8
Conservative	8	Conservative	3
Independent	2	Independent	3 (Note: Deborah Merryweather and Fraser Merryweather sit as part of the Bassetlaw First group, which is not registered as a political party.)

Changes 2023 — 2027:

- May 2024:
  - Anthony Coultate (Conservative) resigns — by-election held July 2024
  - Deborah Merryweather (Labour) and Fraser Merryweather (Labour) leave party to sit as independents
- July 2024: Simon Richardson (Conservative) wins by-election
- March 2025:
  - Joan Sanger (Independent) resigns — by-election held May 2025
  - James Naish (Labour) resigns — by-election held May 2025
- May 2025:
  - Warren Limber (Reform) gains by-election from Independent
  - Matt Turner (Reform) gains by-election from Labour
  - David Bamford (Conservative) resigns — by-election held July 2025
- July 2025: Andrew McCallum (Reform) gains by-election from Conservatives
- October 2025: Lewis Stanniland (Conservative) joins Reform
- December 2025: Simon Richardson (Conservative) leaves party to sit as an independent
- February 2026: Simon Richardson (Independent) joins Reform
- July 2026: Gary Dinsdale (Conservative) resigns — by-election held September 2026
- September 2026:
  - Matthew Evans (Reform) gains by-election from Conservatives
  - Jo White (Labour) resigns — by-election to be held October 2026
- October 2026: Nancy Wright (Reform) gains by-election from Labour
