= East Markham (Bassetlaw electoral ward) =

- Electoral ward
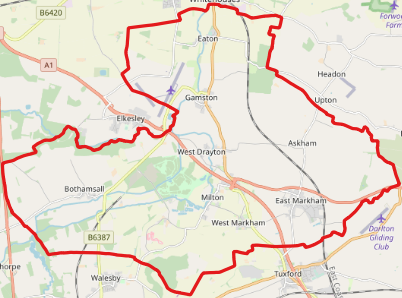
- Electorate: 2,020 (2019)
- District: Bassetlaw
- Region: East Midlands
- Country: England
- Sovereign state: United Kingdom
- Postcode district: DN22
- Postcode district: NG22
- UK Parliament: Newark
- Councillors: 1

East Markham is an electoral ward in the district of Bassetlaw. The ward elects one councillor to Bassetlaw District Council using the first past the post electoral system for a four-year term in office. The number of registered voters in the ward is 2,020 as of 2019.

It consists of the villages of Askham, Bevercotes, Bothamsall, East Markham, Eaton, Gamston, Haughton, West Drayton and West Markham.

The ward was created in 2002 following a review of electoral boundaries in Bassetlaw by the Boundary Committee for England.

== Councillors ==
Interactive map of ward boundaries.

The ward elects one councillor every four years. Prior to 2015, Bassetlaw District Council was elected by thirds with elections taking place every year except the year in which elections to Nottinghamshire County Council took place.

Election	Councillor
2002	Pamela Lewis (Liberal Democrats)
2003	John Ogle (Conservative)
2007	John Ogle (Conservative)
2011	John Ogle (Conservative)
2015	John Ogle (Conservative)
2019	John Ogle (Conservative)
2023	Gary Dinsdale (Conservative)

== Elections ==
=== 2023 ===
East Markham (1)
Party	Candidate	Votes	%	±%
Conservative	Gary Dinsdale	491	66.0%	N/A
Labour	Marcin Wasiak	158	21.2%	N/A
Liberal Democrats	Peter Thompson	95	12.8%	N/A
Turnout		749	36.6%	
Conservative hold		Swing		

=== 2019 ===
East Markham (1) 2 May 2019
Party	Candidate	Votes	%	±%
Conservative	John Ogle*	Unopposed		
Turnout		N/A	N/A	N/A
Registered electors		2,020		

=== 2015 ===
East Markham (1) 7 May 2015
Party	Candidate	Votes	%	±%
Conservative	John Ogle	1,110	76.6%	
Labour	Cecily Wilde	340	23.4%	
Turnout			74.9%	
Conservative hold		Swing		

=== 2011 ===
East Markham (1) 5 May 2011
Party	Candidate	Votes	%	±%
Conservative	John Ogle	745	75.4%	
Labour	James Napier	243	24.6%	
Turnout		988	54.2%	
Registered electors		1,842		

=== 2007 ===
East Markham (1) 3 May 2007
Party	Candidate	Votes	%	±%
Conservative	John Ogle	734	83.5%	
Labour	Roderick Pickford	145	16.5%	
Turnout		879	47.7%	
Registered electors		1,843		

=== 2003 ===
East Markham (1) 1 May 2003
Party	Candidate	Votes	%	±%
Conservative	John Ogle	471	55.0%	
Liberal Democrats	Ann Neumann	385	45.0%	
Turnout		856	47.2%	
Registered electors		1,827		

=== 2002 ===
East Markham (1)
Party	Candidate	Votes	%	±%
Liberal Democrats	Pamela Lewis	592	65.0%	
Conservative	Christopher Pataky	319	35.0%	
Turnout		913	51.0%	
Registered electors		1,789		
Liberal Democrats win (new seat)				
