= East Retford South (Bassetlaw electoral ward) =

- Electoral ward
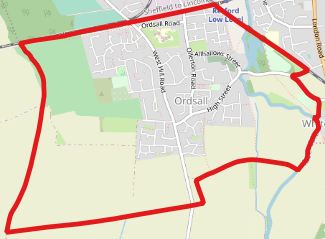
- Electorate: 3,888 (2019)
- District: Bassetlaw
- Region: East Midlands
- Country: England
- Sovereign state: United Kingdom
- Postcode district: DN22
- UK Parliament: Bassetlaw
- Councillors: 2

East Retford South is an electoral ward in the district of Bassetlaw. The ward elects two councillors to Bassetlaw District Council using the first past the post electoral system, with each councillor serving a four-year term in office. The number of registered voters in the ward is 3,888 as of 2019.

It consists of the southern part of the village of Ordsall in Retford, south of the train line.

The ward was created in 2002 following a review of electoral boundaries in Bassetlaw by the Boundary Committee for England.

== Councillors ==
Interactive map of ward boundaries.

The ward elects 2 councillors every four years. Prior to 2015, Bassetlaw District Council was elected by thirds with elections taking place every year except the year in which elections to Nottinghamshire County Council took place.

| Election | Councillor | Councillor |
|---|---|---|
| 2002 | Carolyn Troop (Labour) | Lionel Skelding (Labour) |
| 2004 | Carolyn Troop (Labour) | Lionel Skelding (Labour) |
| 2006 | Carolyn Troop (Labour) | Lionel Skelding (Labour) |
| 2008 | Carolyn Troop (Labour) | Bryn Jones (Conservative) |
| 2010 | Carolyn Troop (Labour) | Bryn Jones (Conservative) |
| 2012 | Carolyn Troop (Labour) | Ann Batty (Labour) |
| 2014 | Carolyn Troop (Labour) | Ann Batty (Labour) |
| 2015 | Carolyn Troop (Labour) | Helen Richards (Labour) |
| 2019 | Carolyn Troop (Labour) | Helen Richards (Labour) |
| 2021 (by-election) | Carolyn Troop (Labour) | Mike Introna (Conservative) |
| 2023 | Carolyn Troop (Labour) | David Naylor (Labour) |

== Elections ==
=== 2023 ===
East Retford South (2)
| Party | Candidate | Votes | % | ±% |
|---|---|---|---|---|
| Labour | Carolyn Troop (inc) | 634 | 52.7% | ▼9.4% |
| Labour | David Naylor | 599 | | |
| Conservative | Daniel Ashford | 381 | 31.7% | ▲14.1% |
| Conservative | Eva Cernysovaite | 315 | | |
| Independent | John Hudson | 97 | 8.1% | NEW |
| Liberal Democrats | Ian Edley | 91 | 7.6% | NEW |
| Turnout | | 1,169 | 30.3% | |
| Labour hold | | Swing | | |
| Labour hold | | Swing | | |

=== 2021 by-election ===
A by-election was held on 29 July 2021 following the resignation of Helen Richards (Labour). Helen subsequently stood for re-election as an Independent candidate.

East Retford South (1) 29 July 2021
| Party | Candidate | Votes | % | ±% |
|---|---|---|---|---|
| Conservative | Mike Introna | 493 | 40.1% | ▲22.5 |
| Independent | Helen Richards* | 488 | 39.7% | New |
| Labour | James Napier | 247 | 20.1% | ▼42.0 |
| Turnout | | | 32.1 | +2.6 |
| Conservative gain from Labour | | Swing | | |

=== 2019 ===
East Retford South (2) 2 May 2019
| Party | Candidate | Votes | % | ±% |
|---|---|---|---|---|
| Labour | Helen Richards* | 697 | 62.1% | ▲11.7% |
| Labour | Carolyn Troop* | 679 | | |
| UKIP | Martin Introna | 228 | 20.3% | ▼0.3% |
| Conservative | John Manners | 197 | 17.6% | ▼11.5% |
| Conservative | Paul Chambers | 179 | | |
| Turnout | | | 29.5% | |
| Labour hold | | Swing | | |
| Labour hold | | Swing | | |

=== 2015 ===
East Retford South (2) 7 May 2015
| Party | Candidate | Votes | % | ±% |
|---|---|---|---|---|
| Labour | Carolyn Troop | 1,194 | 50.4% | |
| Labour | Helen Richards | 1,186 | | |
| Conservative | Bryn Jones | 689 | 29.1% | |
| UKIP | Michael Lowe | 488 | 20.6% | |
| Turnout | | | 65% | |
| Labour hold | | Swing | | |
| Labour hold | | Swing | | |

=== 2014 ===
East Retford South (1) 22 May 2014
| Party | Candidate | Votes | % | ±% |
|---|---|---|---|---|
| Labour | Carolyn Troop | 642 | 54.6% | |
| UKIP | Chris Walters | 314 | 26.7% | |
| Conservative | Bryn Jones | 220 | 18.7% | |
| Turnout | | | | |

=== 2012 ===
East Retford South (1) 3 May 2012
| Party | Candidate | Votes | % | ±% |
|---|---|---|---|---|
| Labour | Ann Batty | 831 | 71.5% | |
| Conservative | Bryn Jones | 331 | 28.5% | |
| Turnout | | | 34.9% | |

=== 2010 ===
East Retford South (1) 6 May 2010
| Party | Candidate | Votes | % | ±% |
|---|---|---|---|---|
| Labour | Carolyn Troop | 1,287 | 63.8% | |
| Conservative | Ferzanna Riley | 730 | 36.2% | |
| Turnout | | | 63.7% | |

=== 2008 ===
East Retford South (1) 1 May 2008
| Party | Candidate | Votes | % | ±% |
|---|---|---|---|---|
| Conservative | Bryn Jones | 526 | 53.4% | |
| Labour | Philip Skelding | 459 | 46.6% | |
| Turnout | | | 30% | |

=== 2006 ===
East Retford South (1) 4 May 2006
| Party | Candidate | Votes | % | ±% |
|---|---|---|---|---|
| Labour | Carolyn Troop | 618 | 56.9% | |
| Conservative | Stephen Thornhill | 468 | 43.1% | |
| Turnout | | | 33.2% | |

=== 2004 ===
East Retford South (1) 10 June 2004
| Party | Candidate | Votes | % | ±% |
|---|---|---|---|---|
| Labour | Lionel Skelding | 746 | 56.5% | |
| Conservative | Andrew Dibb | 575 | 43.5% | |
| Turnout | | | | |
