= Langold (Bassetlaw electoral ward) =

- Electoral ward
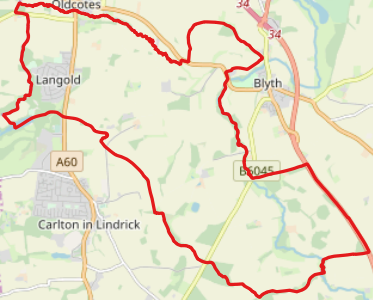
- Electorate: 1,942 (2019)
- District: Bassetlaw
- Region: East Midlands
- Country: England
- Sovereign state: United Kingdom
- Postcode district: S81
- UK Parliament: Bassetlaw
- Councillors: 1

Langold is an electoral ward in the district of Bassetlaw. The ward elects one councillor to Bassetlaw District Council using the first past the post electoral system for a four-year term in office. The number of registered voters in the ward is 1,942 as of 2019.

It consists of the village of Langold and the hamlet of Hodsock.

The ward was created in 2002 following a review of electoral boundaries in Bassetlaw by the Boundary Committee for England.

== Councillors ==
Interactive map of ward boundaries.

The ward elects one councillor every four years. Prior to 2015, Bassetlaw District Council was elected by thirds with elections taking place every year except the year in which elections to Nottinghamshire County Council took place.

Election	Councillor
2002	Sara Jackson (Labour)
2006	Jill Freeman (Labour)
2010	Jill Freeman (Labour)
2014	Jill Freeman (Labour)
2015	Jill Freeman (Labour)
2019	Jill Freeman (Labour)
2023	Jill Freeman (Labour)

== Elections ==
=== 2023 ===
Langold (1)
Party	Candidate	Votes	%	±%
Labour	Jill Freeman (inc)	313	68.6%	▼7.7%
Conservative	James Palmer	143	31.4%	▲7.7%
Turnout		466	23.9%	
Labour hold		Swing		

=== 2019 ===
Langold (1) 2 May 2019
Party	Candidate	Votes	%	±%
Labour	Jill Freeman*	332	76.3%	▲6.2
Conservative	Stephen Evans	103	23.7%	N/A
Turnout		456	23.5%	
Labour hold		Swing		

=== 2015 ===
Langold (1) 7 May 2015
Party	Candidate	Votes	%	±%
Labour	Jill Freeman	750	70.1%	
UKIP	Kevin Blackburn	320	29.9%	
Turnout			57.4%	
Labour hold		Swing		

=== 2014 ===
Langold (1) 22 May 2014
Party	Candidate	Votes	%	±%
Labour	Jill Freeman	391	64.6%	
UKIP	David Jackson	186	30.7%	
Conservative	Dianne Hare	28	4.6%	
Turnout				
Labour hold		Swing		

=== 2010 ===
Langold (1) 6 May 2010
Party	Candidate	Votes	%	±%
Labour	Jill Freeman	857	78.0%	
Conservative	Pat Grant	242	22.0%	
Turnout		1,099	62.4%	
Labour hold		Swing		

=== 2006 ===
Langold (1) 4 May 2006
Party	Candidate	Votes	%	±%
Labour	Jill Freeman	344	69.2%	
Conservative	Tracey Taylor	153	30.8%	
Turnout			26.4%	
