= Misterton (Bassetlaw electoral ward) =

- Electoral ward
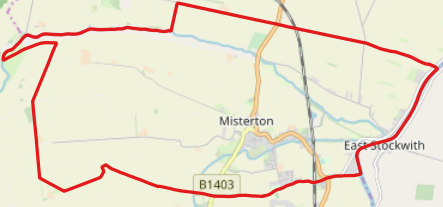
- Electorate: 2,013 (2019)
- District: Bassetlaw
- Region: East Midlands
- Country: England
- Sovereign state: United Kingdom
- Postcode district: DN10
- UK Parliament: Bassetlaw
- Councillors: 1

Misterton is an electoral ward in the district of Bassetlaw. The ward elects one councillor to Bassetlaw District Council using the first past the post electoral system for a four-year term in office. The number of registered voters in the ward is 2,013 as of 2019.

It consists of the villages of Misterton and West Stockwith.

The ward was created in 1979 following a review of ward boundaries in Bassetlaw by the Local Government Boundary Commission for England.

== Councillors ==
Interactive map of ward boundaries.

The ward elects one councillor every four years. Prior to 2015, Bassetlaw District Council was elected by thirds with elections taking place every year except the year in which elections to Nottinghamshire County Council took place.

Election	Councillor
1979	F. Wright (Independent)
1982	F. Wright (Independent)
1986	F. Wright (Independent)
1990	Jose Barry (Labour)
1994	Jose Barry (Labour)
1998	Jose Barry (Labour)
2002	Jose Barry (Labour)
2006	Raymond Simpson (Conservative)
2010	Hazel Brand (Independent)
2014	Hazel Brand (Independent)
2015	Hazel Brand (Independent)
2019	Hazel Brand (Independent)
2023	Hazel Brand (Independent)

== Elections ==
=== 2023 ===
Misterton (1)
Party	Candidate	Votes	%	±%
Independent	Hazel Brand (inc)	499	86.3%	▲4.9%
Conservative	Richard Maltby-Azeemi	79	13.7%	▼4.9%
Turnout		583	29.6%	
Independent hold		Swing		

=== 2019 ===
Misterton (1) 2 May 2019
Party	Candidate	Votes	%	±%
Independent	Hazel Brand*	473	81.4%	▲23.3
Conservative	Alastair Bowman	108	18.6%	▼7.2
Turnout		592	29.4%	
Independent hold		Swing		
Registered electors		2,013		

=== 2015 ===
Misterton (1) 7 May 2015
Party	Candidate	Votes	%	±%
Independent	Hazel Brand	744	58.1%	
Conservative	James Wood	331	25.8%	
UKIP	Charles Capp	206	16.1%	
Turnout			65.5%	
Independent hold		Swing		

=== 2014 ===
Misterton (1) 22 May 2014
Party	Candidate	Votes	%	±%
Independent	Hazel Brand	491	66.4%	
UKIP	Roger Capp	150	20.3%	
Conservative	Simon Taylor	98	13.3%	
Turnout				

=== 2010 ===
Misterton (1) 6 May 2010
Party	Candidate	Votes	%	±%
Independent	Hazel Brand	773	58.2%	
Conservative	Raymond Simpson	554	41.8%	
Turnout		1,327	68.4%	
Registered electors		1,958		
Independent gain from Conservative		Swing		

=== 2006 ===
Misterton (1) 4 May 2006
Party	Candidate	Votes	%	±%
Conservative	Raymond Simpson	321	50.7%	
Labour	Jose Barry	312	49.3%	
Turnout		633	33.1%	
Registered electors		1,915		

=== 2002 ===
Misterton (1) 2 May 2002
Party	Candidate	Votes	%	±%
Labour	Jose Barry	368	65.0%	
Conservative	John Ogle	198	35.0%	
Turnout		559	30.5%	
Registered electors		1,834		
Labour win (new seat)				
