= 2019 Bassetlaw District Council election =

Local election in England

- 2 May 2019

All 48 seats to Bassetlaw District Council 25 seats needed for a majority
- Turnout: 30%
	First party	Second party	Third party
	Lab	Con	Ind
Leader	Simon Greaves	Marie Critchley	N/A
Party	Labour	Conservative	Independent
Last election	33 seats, 41.1%	12 seats, 33.8%	3 seats, 4.0%
Seats won	37	5	5
Seat change	▲4	▼7	▲2
Popular vote	11,766	7,484	3,366
Percentage	45.4%	28.9%	13.0%
Swing	▲4.3%	▼4.9%	▲9.0%
	Fourth party
	Lib Dem
Leader	Leon Duveen
Party	Liberal Democrats
Last election	0 seats, 0%
Seats before	0
Seats won	1
Seats after	1
Seat change	▲1
- Map of the results of the election. Colours denote the winning party, as shown in the main table of results.
Council control before election
Labour
Council control after election
Labour

The 2019 Bassetlaw District Council election took place on 2 May 2019 to elect all 48 members of Bassetlaw District Council in England. This was on the same day as other local elections.

The election resulted in the Labour Party retaining its control of the council with an increased majority. The Conservative Party suffered its worst defeat in Bassetlaw since 1973, winning only 5 seats of the 12 seats it was defending. Both Independents and Labour gained seats from the Conservatives. The Liberal Democrats gained a seat from Labour in East Retford West, the first Liberal Democrat elected in Bassetlaw since 2006.

== Background ==
Map of the electoral wards of Bassetlaw.

Bassetlaw is a shire district in Nottinghamshire, England. It is predominantly rural, with two towns: Worksop and Retford. The district was formed in 1974 by the Local Government Act 1972. Local Government in Nottinghamshire is organised on a two-tier basis, with local district councils responsible for local services such as housing, local planning and refuse collection and Nottinghamshire County Council responsible for "wide-area" services, including education, social services and public transport. Bassetlaw District Council has been controlled by Labour for most of its existence, except for a brief period from 2006 to 2011 when it was controlled by the Conservatives.

Bassetlaw District Council held local elections on 2 May 2019 along with other councils in England as part of the 2019 local elections. Bassetlaw is divided into 25 wards for electoral purposes, with each ward electing between one and three councillors. Until 2015, the council was elected by thirds, with district elections being held every year except the year in which elections to Nottinghamshire County Council took place. The council resolved in 2014 to hold all-out elections from 2015 onwards, with all 48 councillors elected in all-out elections every four years. Councillors defending their seats in this election were previously elected in 2015. At that election, Labour won a majority of seats and retained its control of the council, which it has controlled since 2011.

== Result ==
The election resulted in the Labour Party retaining its control of the council

Bassetlaw District Council election, 2019
Party	Seats	Gains	Losses	Net gain/loss	Seats %	Votes %	Votes	+/−
Labour	37	5	1	▲4		45.4	11,766	▲4.3
Conservative	5	0	7	▼7		28.9	7,484	▼4.9
Independent	5	3	1	▲2		13.0	3,366	▲9.0
Liberal Democrats	1	1	0	▲1		4.7	1,211	▲3.3
UKIP	0	0	0	Steady		8.0	2,061	▼8.8

== Ward results ==
Asterisks denote incumbent Councillors seeking re-election.

=== Beckingham ===
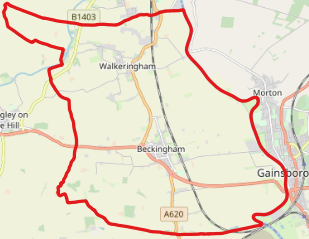
Map of Beckingham ward.

Beckingham (1)
Party	Candidate	Votes	%	±%
Independent	Joan Sanger*	558	73.1	▲33.4
Conservative	Raymond Simpson	205	26.9	▼5.0
Turnout		781	41.1	
Independent hold		Swing		

=== Blyth ===
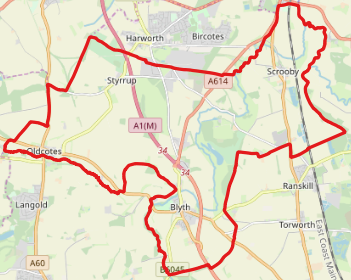
Map of Blyth ward.

Blyth (1)
Party	Candidate	Votes	%	±%
Labour	Jack Bowker	261	38.1	▲3.5
Conservative	Barry Bowles*	237	34.6	▼9.6
UKIP	John Hudson	124	18.1	▲1.6
Liberal Democrats	Peter Thompson	63	9.2	▲4.5
Turnout		693	37.2	
Labour gain from Conservative		Swing		

=== Carlton ===
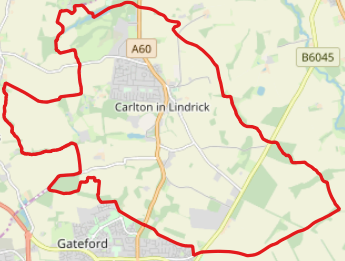
Map of Carlton ward.

Carlton (3)
Party	Candidate	Votes	%	±%
Labour	Steve Scotthorne*	779	53.7	
Labour	David Pidwell*	644	44.4	
Labour	Robin Carrington-Wilde*	636	43.8	
Conservative	Val Bowles	506	34.8	
Conservative	Joanne Morrison	433	29.8	
UKIP	Kevin "Of the Blackburn family"	329	22.7	
Conservative	Alexandra Gregory	324	22.3	
Turnout		1,457	32.8	
Labour hold		Swing		
Labour hold		Swing		
Labour hold		Swing		

=== Clayworth ===
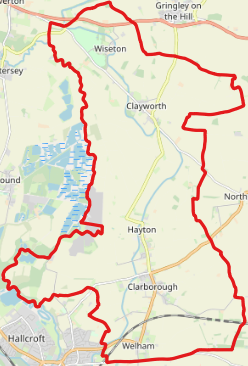
Map of Clayworth ward.

Clayworth (1)
Party	Candidate	Votes	%	±%
Independent	Ben Sofflet	315	56.3	N/A
Conservative	Drew Smith	245	43.8	▼29.5
Turnout		576	37.7	
Independent gain from Conservative		Swing		

=== East Markham ===
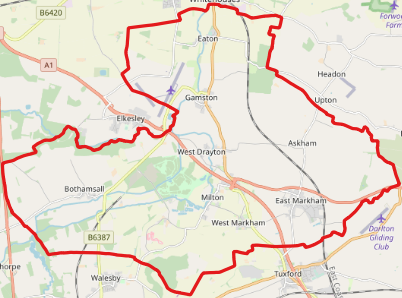
Map of East Markham ward.

East Markham (1) – uncontested election
Party	Candidate	Votes	%	±%
Conservative	John Ogle*	Unopposed		
Turnout		N/A	N/A	N/A

=== East Retford East ===
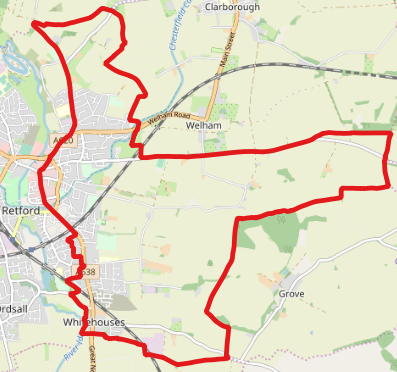
Map of East Retford East ward.

East Retford East (3)
Party	Candidate	Votes	%	±%
Labour	Susan Shaw*	728	46.3	
Conservative	Mike Quigley*	704	44.8	
Labour	Bill Tomlinson	669	42.6	
Conservative	Martin Auckland	622	39.6	
Conservative	Richard Gill	620	39.4	
Labour	Fraser Merryweather	554	35.2	
Liberal Democrats	Karen Costello	226	14.4	N/A
Turnout		1,610	30.5	
Labour hold		Swing		
Conservative hold		Swing		
Labour hold		Swing		

=== East Retford North ===
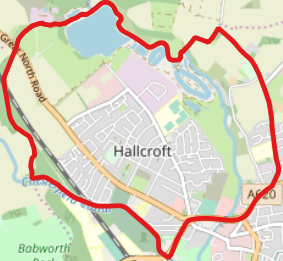
Map of East Retford North ward.

East Retford North (3)
Party	Candidate	Votes	%	±%
Labour	Graham Oxby*	895	59.8	
Labour	Jane Plevin	734	49.0	
Labour	Garry Clarkson*	667	44.6	
Conservative	Lynda Carter	466	31.1	
Conservative	Anthony Tromans*	438	29.3	
Conservative	Donald Clarke	370	24.7	
Liberal Democrats	Paul Straker	207	13.8	N/A
Turnout		1,533	30.6	
Labour hold		Swing		
Labour hold		Swing		
Labour gain from Conservative		Swing		

=== East Retford South ===
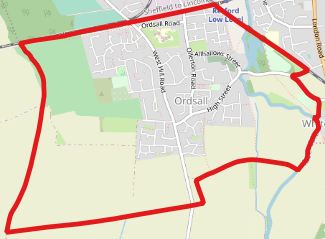
Map of East Retford South ward.

East Retford South (2)
Party	Candidate	Votes	%	±%
Labour	Helen Richards*	697	61.6	
Labour	Carolyn Troop*	679	60.0	
UKIP	Martin Introna	228	20.2	
Conservative	John Manners	197	17.4	
Conservative	Paul Chambers	179	15.8	
Turnout		1,146	29.5	
Labour hold		Swing		
Labour hold		Swing		

=== East Retford West ===
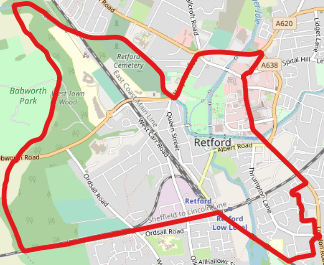
Map of East Retford West ward.

East Retford West (2)
Party	Candidate	Votes	%	±%
Labour	Jim Anderson*	394	37.7	
Liberal Democrats	Helen Tamblyn-Saville	371	35.5	
Labour	Matt Callingham	364	34.9	
Conservative	Ashley Burnell	236	22.6	
Independent	Marie Critchley	191	18.3	N/A
Liberal Democrats	Stephen Ware	164	15.7	
Conservative	Ashraf Syed Abdul Cader	142	13.6	
Turnout		1,062	28.4	
Labour hold		Swing		
Liberal Democrats gain from Labour		Swing		

=== Everton ===
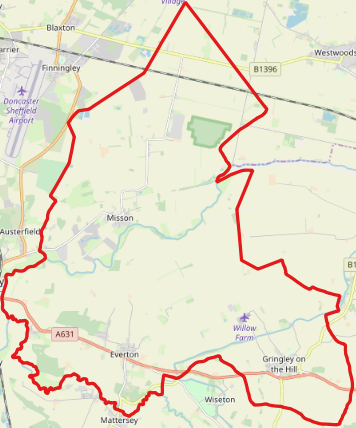
Map of Everton ward.

Everton (1)
Party	Candidate	Votes	%	±%
Independent	Mark Watson	405	56.8	N/A
Conservative	Annette Simpson*	308	43.2	▼11.7
Turnout		718	36.0	
Independent gain from Conservative		Swing		

=== Harworth ===
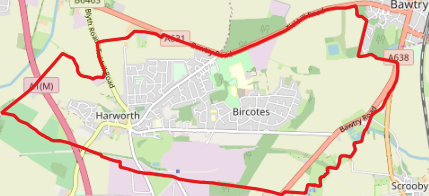
Map of Harworth ward.

Harworth (3)
Party	Candidate	Votes	%	±%
Labour	Gloria Evans*	986	67.6	
Labour	David Challinor*	961	65.9	
Labour	Beverley Schuller	940	64.4	
Conservative	Sonia Armstrong	380	26.0	
Conservative	Leah Davis	369	25.3	
Conservative	Gavin McGonigle	322	22.1	
Turnout		1,532	24.9	
Labour hold		Swing		
Labour hold		Swing		
Labour hold		Swing		

=== Langold ===
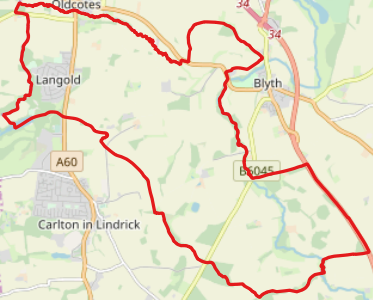
Map of Langold ward.

Langold (1)
Party	Candidate	Votes	%	±%
Labour	Jill Freeman*	332	76.3	▲6.2
Conservative	Stephen Evans	103	23.7	N/A
Turnout		456	23.5	
Labour hold		Swing		

=== Misterton ===
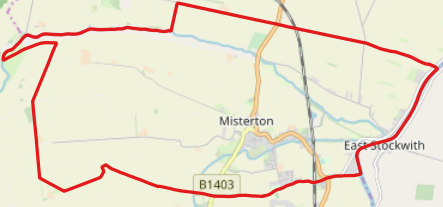
Map of Misterton ward.

Misterton (1)
Party	Candidate	Votes	%	±%
Independent	Hazel Brand*	473	81.4	▲23.3
Conservative	Alastair Bowman	108	18.6	▼7.2
Turnout		592	29.4	
Independent hold		Swing		

=== Rampton ===
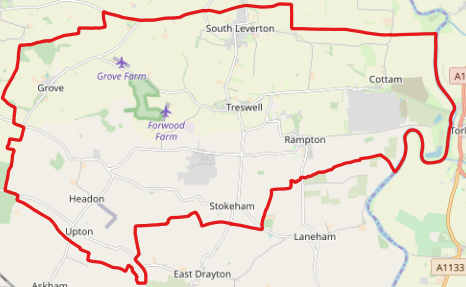
Map of Rampton ward.

Rampton (1)
Party	Candidate	Votes	%	±%
Conservative	Anthony Coultate	372	72.0	▲2.6
Labour	Raymond Fielding	145	28.0	▼2.6
Turnout		550	32.6	
Conservative hold		Swing		

=== Ranskill ===
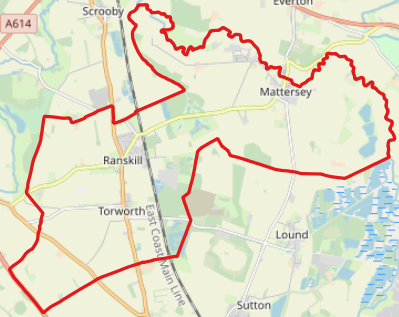
Map of Ranskill ward.

Ranskill (1)
Party	Candidate	Votes	%	±%
Labour	Paul Nicholls	278	39.5	▲15.0
Conservative	Beverley Fear	204	29.0	▼34.0
Independent	Michael Gray*	177	25.1	N/A
Liberal Democrats	Mark Hunter	45	6.4	▼6.1
Turnout		710	38.2	
Labour gain from Conservative		Swing		

=== Sturton ===
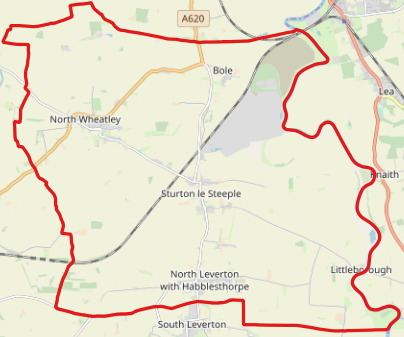
Map of Sturton ward.

Sturton (1)
Party	Candidate	Votes	%	±%
Labour	James Naish	436	62.4	▲40.8
Conservative	Daniel Gregory	263	37.6	N/A
Turnout		731	39.5	
Labour gain from Independent		Swing		

=== Sutton ===
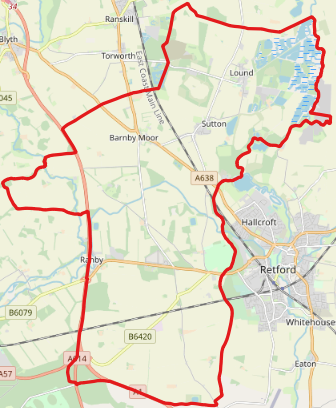
Map of Sutton ward.

Sutton (1)
Party	Candidate	Votes	%	±%
Independent	Rob Boeuf	381	61.7	N/A
Conservative	Emma Auckland	163	26.4	▼39.6
Labour	Gary Moore	74	12.0	▼13.7
Turnout		627	37.5	
Independent gain from Conservative		Swing		

=== Tuxford and Trent ===
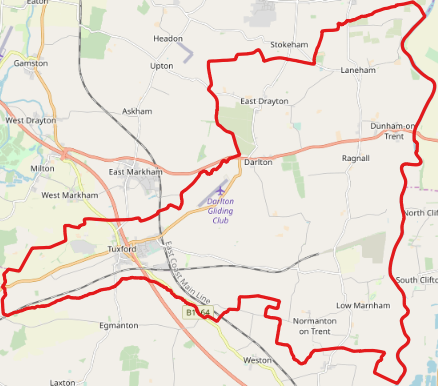
Map of Tuxford and Trent ward.

Tuxford and Trent (2)
Party	Candidate	Votes	%	±%
Conservative	Keith Isard*	453	47.5	
Conservative	Shirley Isard*	412	43.2	
Independent	Matt Richards	385	40.4	N/A
Labour	Rebecca Littler-Leigh	204	21.4	
Labour	Michael Ouzman	159	16.7	
Turnout		974	27.9	
Conservative hold		Swing		
Conservative hold		Swing		

=== Welbeck ===
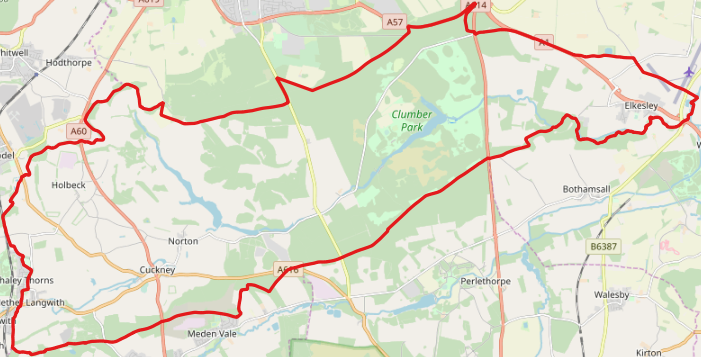
Map of Welbeck ward.

Welbeck (1)
Party	Candidate	Votes	%	±%
Labour	Kevin Dukes*	324	60.3	▲13.1
Conservative	Matthew Evans	213	39.7	▼4.1
Turnout		563	36.8	
Labour hold		Swing		

=== Worksop East ===
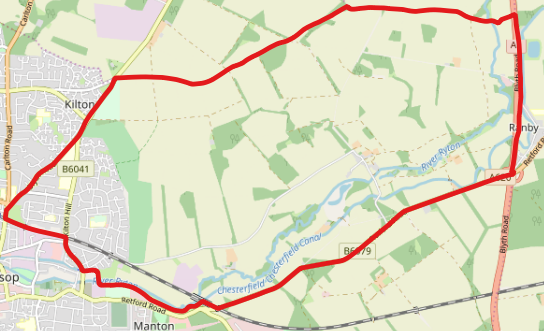
Map of Worksop East ward.

Worksop East (3)
Party	Candidate	Votes	%	±%
Labour	Cliff Entwistle*	834	56.5	
Labour	Debbie Merryweather*	785	53.1	
Labour	Jo White*	767	51.9	
UKIP	David Kirton	480	32.5	
Conservative	Deidre Vernon	167	11.3	
Conservative	Arthur Dernie	161	10.9	
Conservative	Susan Radcliffe	156	10.6	
Liberal Democrats	Helen Cooper	143	9.7	N/A
Turnout		1,481	29.5	
Labour hold		Swing		
Labour hold		Swing		
Labour hold		Swing		

=== Worksop North ===
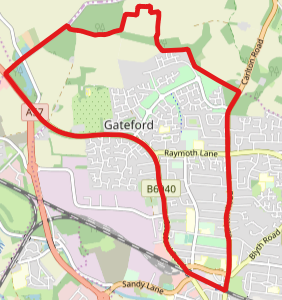
Map of Worksop North ward.

Worksop North (3)
Party	Candidate	Votes	%	±%
Labour	Maria Charlesworth	874	53.0	
Labour	Neil Sanders	843	51.1	
Labour	Gwynneth Jones	826	50.1	
UKIP	Glen Marshall	482	29.2	
Conservative	Neil Dexter	410	24.9	
Conservative	Alan Tonks	344	20.9	
Conservative	Roger Vernon	338	20.5	
Turnout		1,706	24.8	
Labour hold		Swing		
Labour hold		Swing		
Labour hold		Swing		

=== Worksop North East ===
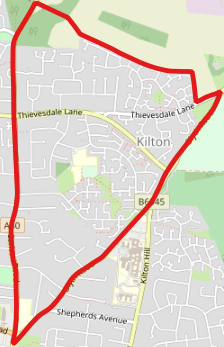
Map of Worksop North East ward.

Worksop North East (3)
Party	Candidate	Votes	%	±%
Labour	Alan Rhodes*	863	67.2	
Labour	Simon Greaves*	828	64.4	
Labour	Maddy Richardson*	774	60.2	
Conservative	Alec Thorpe	347	27.0	
Conservative	Matthew Peck	344	26.8	
Conservative	John Anderson	330	25.7	
Turnout		1,355	27.4	
Labour hold		Swing		
Labour hold		Swing		
Labour hold		Swing		

=== Worksop North West ===
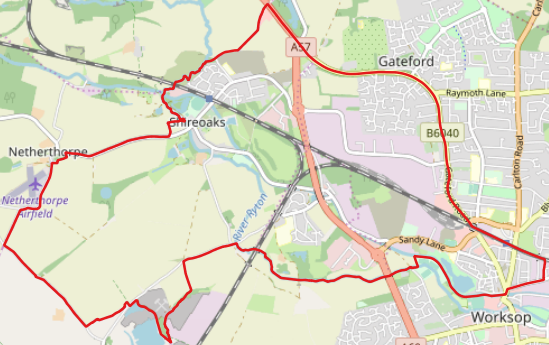
Map of Worksop North West ward.

Worksop North West (3)
Party	Candidate	Votes	%	±%
Labour	Sybil Fielding*	885	60.9	
Labour	David Pressley*	830	57.1	
Labour	Dean Brett*	793	54.6	
Conservative	Richard Barnes	420	28.9	
Conservative	Tim Chapman	324	22.3	
Conservative	Pamela Briggs	317	21.8	
Turnout		1,477	25.3	
Labour hold		Swing		
Labour hold		Swing		
Labour hold		Swing		

=== Worksop South ===
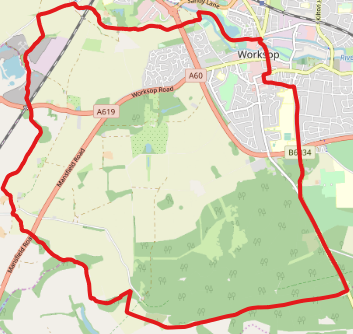
Map of Worksop South ward.

Worksop South (3)
Party	Candidate	Votes	%	±%
Labour	Julie Leigh*	832	43.5	
Labour	Kevin Greaves*	790	41.3	
Labour	Tony Eaton	766	40.1	
Conservative	Rachel Briggs	657	34.4	
Conservative	Helen Colton	619	32.4	
Conservative	Lewis Stanniland	608	31.8	
Independent	Nigel Turner	481	25.2	N/A
Turnout		1,919	34.1	
Labour gain from Conservative		Swing		
Labour hold		Swing		
Labour hold		Swing		

=== Worksop South East ===
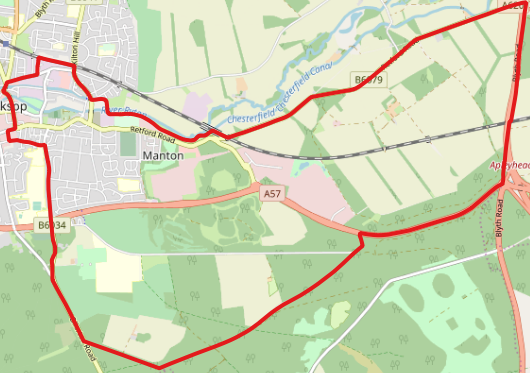
Map of Worksop South East ward.

Worksop South East (3)
Party	Candidate	Votes	%	±%
Labour	Josie Potts*	945	65.8	
Labour	Clayton Tindle*	815	56.8	
Labour	John Shephard*	788	54.9	
UKIP	Ash Henderson	418	29.1	
Liberal Democrats	Leon Duveen	156	10.9	N/A
Conservative	Colin Barton †	120	8.4	N/A
Conservative	Ethel Boddy	88	6.1	N/A
Conservative	Angela Chambers	74	5.2	N/A
Turnout		1,462	25.9	
Labour hold		Swing		
Labour hold		Swing		
Labour hold		Swing		

† Colin Barton was expelled from the Conservative Party in April 2019, however he remained a nominated Conservative candidate in this election as the deadline for withdrawals had passed.

== Changes 2019–2023 ==
- In late 2022, Ranskill councillor Gerald Bowers left the Conservative group to sit as an independent.

=== By-elections ===
==== Ranskill ====
Ranskill by-election, 6 May 2021
Party	Candidate	Votes	%	±%
Conservative	Gerald Bowers	454	63.0	+34.0
Independent	Michael Gray	193	26.8	+1.7
Liberal Democrats	Leon Duveen	74	10.3	+3.9
Majority		261	36.2	
Turnout		728	38.7	
Conservative gain from Labour		Swing		

The Ranskill by-election followed the resignation of Labour councillor Paul Nicholls.

==== Sutton (May 2021) ====
Sutton by-election, 6 May 2021
Party	Candidate	Votes	%	±%
Conservative	Denise Depledge	422	63.7	+37.3
Labour	Laura Sanders	134	20.2	+8.2
Liberal Democrats	Richard Harris	107	16.1	N/A
Majority		288	43.4	
Turnout		670	40.1	
Conservative gain from Independent		Swing		

The Sutton by-election followed the resignation of independent councillor Rob Boeuf.

==== Tuxford and Trent ====
Tuxford and Trent by-election, 6 May 2021
Party	Candidate	Votes	%	±%
Conservative	Lewis Stanniland	745	57.7	+10.2
Labour	David Naylor	472	36.5	+15.1
Liberal Democrats	James Nixon	75	5.8	N/A
Majority		273	21.1	
Turnout		1303	37.6	
Conservative hold		Swing		

The Tuxford and Trent by-election followed the resignation of Conservative councillor Keith Isard.

==== East Retford South ====
East Retford South by-election, 29 July 2021
Party	Candidate	Votes	%	±%
Conservative	Mike Introna	493	40.1	+22.7
Independent	Helen Richards	488	39.7	N/A
Labour	James Napier	247	20.1	−41.5
Majority		5	0.4	
Turnout		1228	32.1	+2.6
Conservative gain from Labour		Swing	32.1	

The East Retford South by-election followed the resignation of Labour councillor Helen Richards in protest against proposed housing development in the ward. Richards contested the by-election as an independent.

==== Sutton (November 2022) ====
Sutton by-election, 24 November 2022
Party	Candidate	Votes	%	±%
Labour	Darrell Pulk	301	55.9	+35.7
Conservative	Fraser McFarland	224	41.6	−22.0
Liberal Democrats	Phil Ray	13	2.4	−13.7
Majority		77	14.3	
Turnout			32.8	
Labour gain from Conservative		Swing	28.9	

The Sutton by-election followed the resignation of Conservative councillor Denise Depledge because of ill health.
