= 2023 Bassetlaw District Council election =

2023 local election in Bassetlaw, England

- 4 May 2023

All 48 seats to Bassetlaw District Council 25 seats needed for a majority
- Turnout: 31.5%

| | First party | Second party |
|---|---|---|
| Leader | James Naish | Lewis Stanniland |
| Party | Labour | Conservative |
| Leader since | 2022 | 2022 |
| Leader's seat | Sturton | Tuxford and Trent |
| Last election | 37 | 5 |
| Seats won | 38 | 8 |
| Seat change | ▲1 | ▲3 |
| Popular vote | 13,587 | 10,235 |
| Percentage | 47.1% | 35.5% |
| | Third party | Fourth party |
| Party | Independent | Liberal Democrats |
| Last election | 5 | 1 |
| Seats won | 2 | 0 |
| Seat change | ▼3 | ▼1 |
| Popular vote | 2,732 | 1,152 |
| Percentage | 9.5% | 4.0% |
- Map of the results of the election. Colours denote the winning party, as shown in the main table of results.
Leader before election
James Naish
Labour
Leader after election
James Naish
Labour

The 2023 Bassetlaw District Council election took place on 4 May 2023 to elect all 48 members of Bassetlaw District Council in England. The election was held on the same day as other local elections in England as part of the 2023 United Kingdom local elections.

The Labour Party retained control of the council with an increased majority, gaining one seat from the Liberal Democrats and one seat from an independent. The Conservatives gained three seats, one from Labour and two from Independents.

== Background ==
Bassetlaw is a shire district in Nottinghamshire, England. It is predominantly rural, with two towns: Worksop and Retford. The district was formed in 1974 by the Local Government Act 1972. Local Government in Nottinghamshire is organised on a two-tier basis, with local district councils responsible for local services such as housing, local planning and refuse collection and Nottinghamshire County Council responsible for "wide-area" services, including education, social services and public transport. Bassetlaw District Council has been controlled by Labour for most of its existence, except for a brief period from 2006 to 2011 when it was controlled by the Conservatives.

Bassetlaw is divided into 25 wards for electoral purposes, with each ward electing between one and three councillors. Until 2015, the council was elected by thirds, with district elections being held every year except the year in which elections to Nottinghamshire County Council took place. The council resolved in 2014 to hold all-out elections from 2015 onwards, with all 48 councillors elected in all-out elections every four years.

== Results summary ==
Bassetlaw District Council election, 2023
| Party | Seats | Gains | Losses | Net gain/loss | Seats % | Votes % | Votes | +/− |
|---|---|---|---|---|---|---|---|---|
| Labour | 38 | 2 | 1 | +1 | | 47.1 | 13,587 | ▲+1.7 |
| Conservative | 8 | 3 | 0 | +3 | | 35.5 | 10,235 | ▲+6.6 |
| Independent | 2 | 0 | 3 | -3 | | 9.5 | 2,732 | ▼-3.5 |
| Liberal Democrats | 0 | 0 | 1 | -1 | | 4.0 | 1,152 | ▼-0.7 |
| Green | 0 | 0 | 0 | 0 | | 4.0 | 1,142 | N/A |

Turnout
| Registered electors | 87,978 |
| Votes cast | 27,738 |
| Turnout | 31.5% (+1.5%) |

== Ward results ==
(inc) denotes incumbent Councillors seeking re-election.

=== Beckingham ===
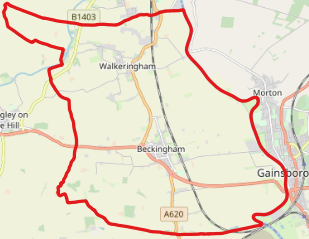
Map of Beckingham ward.

Beckingham (1)
| Party | Candidate | Votes | % | ±% |
|---|---|---|---|---|
| Independent | Joan Sanger (inc) | 447 | 59.0 | ▼14.1 |
| Conservative | April Hayman | 310 | 41.0 | ▲14.1 |
| Turnout | | 760 | 36.9 | ▼4.2 |
| Independent hold | | Swing | | |

=== Blyth ===
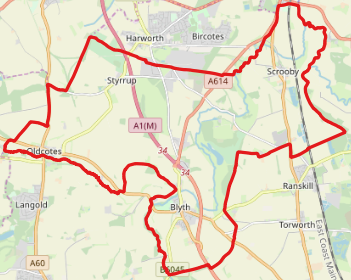
Map of Blyth ward.

Blyth (1)
| Party | Candidate | Votes | % | ±% |
|---|---|---|---|---|
| Labour | Jack Peter Bowker (inc) | 430 | 58.2 | ▲20.1 |
| Conservative | Donald Clarke | 309 | 41.8 | ▲7.2 |
| Turnout | | 744 | 39.8 | ▲2.6 |
| Labour hold | | Swing | | |

=== Carlton ===
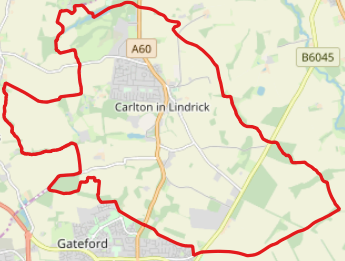
Map of Carlton ward.

Carlton (3)
| Party | Candidate | Votes | % | ±% |
|---|---|---|---|---|
| Labour | Steve Scotthorne (inc) | 807 | 50.1 | ▼3.6 |
| Labour | Robin Carrington-Wilde (inc) | 759 | 47.1 | ▲3.3 |
| Labour | David Pidwell (inc) | 738 | 45.8 | ▲1.4 |
| Conservative | Valerie Bowles | 710 | 44.0 | ▲9.2 |
| Conservative | Charles Lister | 707 | 43.9 | ▲14.1 |
| Conservative | Callum Bailey | 706 | 43.8 | ▲21.5 |
| Turnout | | 1,618 | 34.8 | ▲2.0 |
| Labour hold | | Swing | | |
| Labour hold | | Swing | | |
| Labour hold | | Swing | | |

=== Clayworth ===
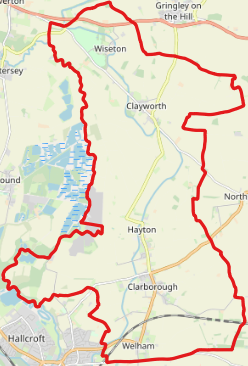
Map of Clayworth ward.

Clayworth (1)
| Party | Candidate | Votes | % | ±% |
|---|---|---|---|---|
| Conservative | Fraser McFarland | 307 | 51.7 | ▲7.9 |
| Independent | Ben Sofflet (inc) | 287 | 48.3 | ▼7.9 |
| Turnout | | 599 | 39.3 | ▲1.6 |
| Conservative gain from Independent | | Swing | | |

=== East Markham ===
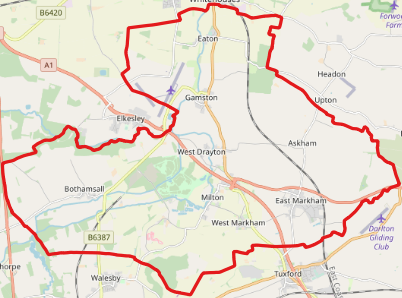
Map of East Markham ward.

East Markham (1)
| Party | Candidate | Votes | % | ±% |
|---|---|---|---|---|
| Conservative | Gary Dinsdale | 491 | 66.0 | N/A |
| Labour | Marcin Wasiak | 158 | 21.2 | N/A |
| Liberal Democrats | Peter Thompson | 95 | 12.8 | N/A |
| Turnout | | 749 | 36.3 | |
| Conservative hold | | Swing | | |

=== East Retford East ===
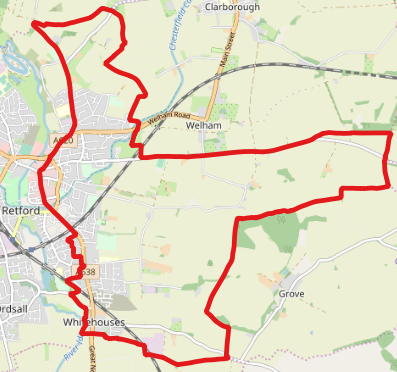
Map of East Retford East ward.

East Retford East (3)
| Party | Candidate | Votes | % | ±% |
|---|---|---|---|---|
| Labour | Sue Shaw (inc) | 859 | 44.5 | ▼1.8 |
| Labour | Daniel Henderson | 795 | 41.2 | ▼1.4 |
| Conservative | John Manners | 727 | 37.7 | ▼7.1 |
| Conservative | Michael Hadwen | 719 | 37.3 | ▼2.3 |
| Labour | Piers Digby | 706 | 36.6 | ▲1.4 |
| Conservative | Liam Wildish | 639 | 33.1 | ▼6.3 |
| Green | Rachel Reeves | 295 | 15.3 | N/A |
| Independent | Gerald Bowers | 270 | 14.0 | N/A |
| Independent | Mandy Bromley | 251 | 13.0 | N/A |
| Turnout | | 1,932 | 35.0 | ▲4.5 |
| Labour hold | | Swing | | |
| Labour hold | | Swing | | |
| Conservative hold | | Swing | | |

=== East Retford North ===
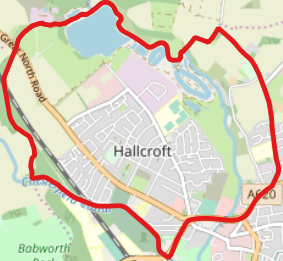
Map of East Retford North ward.

East Retford North (3)
| Party | Candidate | Votes | % | ±% |
|---|---|---|---|---|
| Labour | Graham Oxby (inc) | 934 | 55.1 | ▼4.7 |
| Labour | David Challinor | 852 | 50.2 | ▲1.2 |
| Labour | Jonathan Slater | 793 | 46.8 | ▲2.2 |
| Conservative | Richard Gill | 537 | 31.7 | ▲0.6 |
| Conservative | Anthony Dexter | 505 | 29.8 | ▲0.5 |
| Conservative | Perry Offer | 437 | 25.8 | ▲1.1 |
| Independent | Mark Nicholson | 261 | 15.4 | N/A |
| Liberal Democrats | Jennie Coggles | 173 | 10.2 | ▼3.6 |
| Independent | Clifford Miller | 170 | 10.0 | N/A |
| Turnout | | 1,701 | 33.1 | ▲2.5 |
| Labour hold | | Swing | | |
| Labour hold | | Swing | | |
| Labour hold | | Swing | | |

=== East Retford South ===
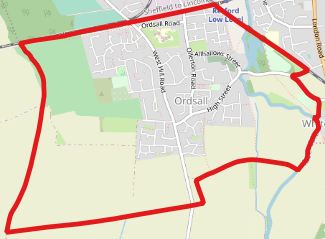
Map of East Retford South ward.

East Retford South (2)
| Party | Candidate | Votes | % | ±% |
|---|---|---|---|---|
| Labour | Carolyn Troop (inc) | 634 | 54.3 | ▼5.7 |
| Labour | David Naylor | 599 | 51.3 | ▼10.3 |
| Conservative | Daniel Ashford | 381 | 32.6 | ▲15.2 |
| Conservative | Eva Cernysovaite | 315 | 27.0 | ▲11.2 |
| Independent | John Hudson | 97 | 8.3 | N/A |
| Liberal Democrats | Ian Edley | 91 | 7.8 | N/A |
| Turnout | | 1,169 | 30.3 | ▲0.8 |
| Labour hold | | Swing | | |
| Labour hold | | Swing | | |

=== East Retford West ===
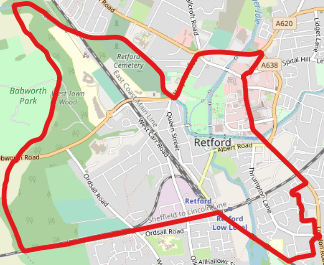
Map of East Retford West ward.

East Retford West (2)
| Party | Candidate | Votes | % | ±% |
|---|---|---|---|---|
| Labour | Harriet Digby | 477 | 39.7 | ▲2.0 |
| Labour | Malachi Carroll | 459 | 38.2 | ▲3.3 |
| Liberal Democrats | Helen Tamblyn-Saville (inc) | 401 | 33.4 | ▼2.1 |
| Conservative | James Purle | 316 | 26.3 | ▲3.7 |
| Conservative | Karen Dexter | 288 | 24.0 | ▲10.4 |
| Liberal Democrats | Phil Ray | 235 | 19.6 | ▲3.9 |
| Independent | Jon Wade | 78 | 6.5 | N/A |
| Turnout | | 1,209 | 31.6 | ▲3.2 |
| Labour hold | | Swing | | |
| Labour gain from Liberal Democrats | | Swing | | |

=== Everton ===
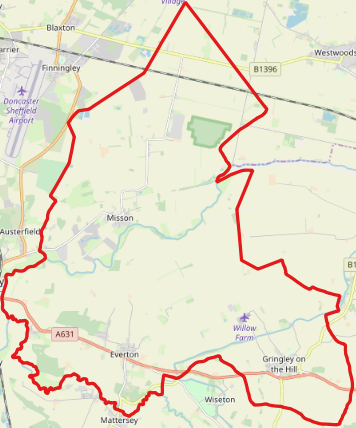
Map of Everton ward.

Everton (1)
| Party | Candidate | Votes | % | ±% |
|---|---|---|---|---|
| Conservative | Steve Pashley | 386 | 50.9 | ▲7.7 |
| Independent | Mark Watson (inc) | 372 | 49.1 | ▼7.7 |
| Turnout | | 765 | 38.1 | ▲2.1 |
| Conservative gain from Independent | | Swing | | |

=== Harworth ===
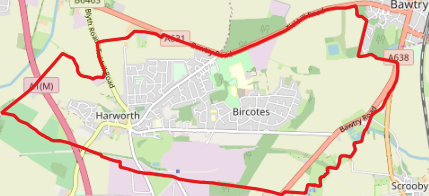
Map of Harworth ward.

Harworth (3)
| Party | Candidate | Votes | % | ±% |
|---|---|---|---|---|
| Labour | Lynne Schuller (inc) | 1,058 | 70.8 | ▲6.4 |
| Labour | June Evans (inc) | 950 | 63.5 | ▼4.1 |
| Labour | Joe Horrocks | 913 | 61.1 | ▼4.8 |
| Conservative | Jake Boothroyd | 298 | 19.9 | ▼6.1 |
| Green | Sarah Whitehead | 269 | 18.0 | N/A |
| Conservative | Alastair Bowman | 259 | 17.3 | ▼8.0 |
| Conservative | Nancy Wright | 235 | 15.7 | ▼6.4 |
| Turnout | | 1,506 | 22.7 | ▼2.2 |
| Labour hold | | Swing | | |
| Labour hold | | Swing | | |
| Labour hold | | Swing | | |

=== Langold ===
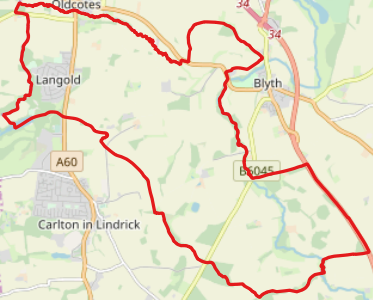
Map of Langold ward.

Langold (1)
| Party | Candidate | Votes | % | ±% |
|---|---|---|---|---|
| Labour | Gillian Freeman (inc) | 313 | 68.6 | ▼7.7 |
| Conservative | James Palmer | 143 | 31.4 | ▲7.7 |
| Turnout | | 466 | 23.9 | ▲0.4 |
| Labour hold | | Swing | | |

=== Misterton ===
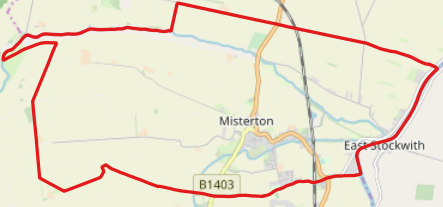
Map of Misterton ward.

Misterton (1)
| Party | Candidate | Votes | % | ±% |
|---|---|---|---|---|
| Independent | Hazel Brand (inc) | 499 | 86.3 | ▲4.9 |
| Conservative | Richard Maltby-Azeemi | 79 | 13.7 | ▼4.9 |
| Turnout | | 583 | 29.6 | ▲0.2 |
| Independent hold | | Swing | | |

=== Rampton ===
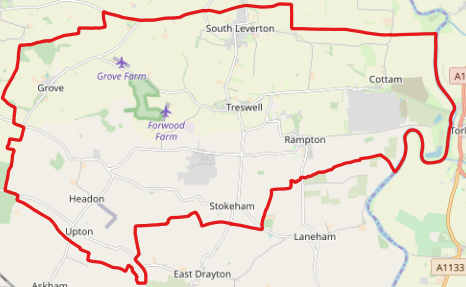
Map of Rampton ward.

Rampton (1)
| Party | Candidate | Votes | % | ±% |
|---|---|---|---|---|
| Conservative | Anthony Coultate (inc) | 381 | 70.6 | ▼1.4 |
| Labour | Joe Butler | 159 | 29.4 | ▲1.4 |
| Turnout | | 547 | 32.7 | ▲0.1 |
| Conservative hold | | Swing | | |

=== Ranskill ===
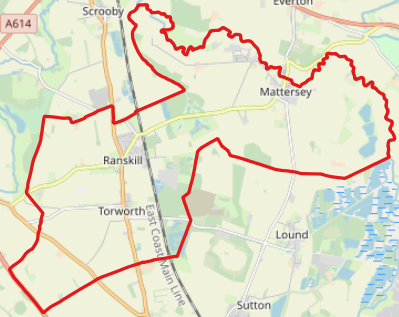
Map of Ranskill ward.

Ranskill (1)
| Party | Candidate | Votes | % | ±% |
|---|---|---|---|---|
| Conservative | David Bamford | 393 | 56.5 | ▲27.5 |
| Labour | Andy Jee | 302 | 43.5 | ▲4.0 |
| Turnout | | 704 | 36.5 | ▼1.7 |
| Conservative gain from Labour | | Swing | | |

=== Sturton ===
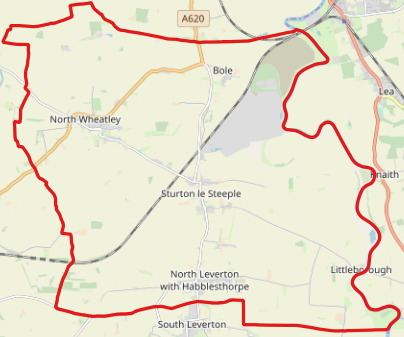
Map of Sturton ward.

Sturton (1)
| Party | Candidate | Votes | % | ±% |
|---|---|---|---|---|
| Labour | James Naish (inc) | 524 | 77.6 | ▲15.2 |
| Conservative | Kirsty Glasby | 151 | 22.4 | ▼15.2 |
| Turnout | | 680 | 36.5 | ▼3.0 |
| Labour hold | | Swing | | |

=== Sutton ===
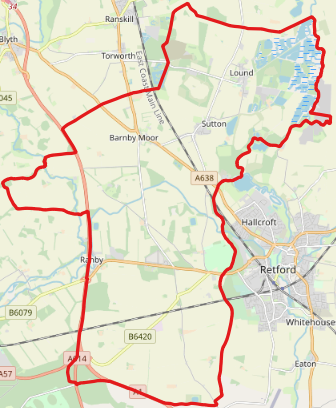
Map of Sutton ward.

Sutton (1)
| Party | Candidate | Votes | % | ±% |
|---|---|---|---|---|
| Labour | Darrell Pulk (inc) | 409 | 58.3 | ▲46.3 |
| Conservative | Tracey Taylor | 292 | 41.7 | ▲15.3 |
| Turnout | | 706 | 42.3 | ▲4.8 |
| Labour gain from Independent | | Swing | | |

=== Tuxford and Trent ===
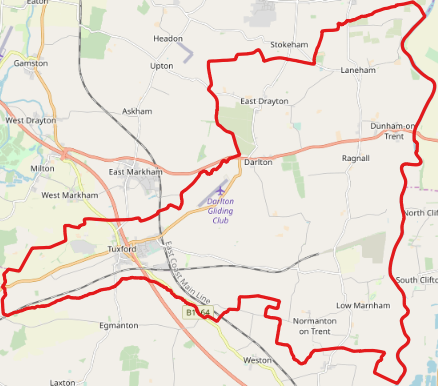
Map of Tuxford and Trent ward.

Tuxford and Trent (2)
| Party | Candidate | Votes | % | ±% |
|---|---|---|---|---|
| Conservative | Emma Griffin | 666 | 60.4 | ▲12.9 |
| Conservative | Lewis Stanniland (inc) | 595 | 53.9 | ▲10.7 |
| Labour | Ian Warton-Woods | 389 | 35.3 | ▲13.9 |
| Green | Denise Taylor-Roome | 297 | 26.9 | N/A |
| Turnout | | 1,110 | 31.3 | ▲3.4 |
| Conservative hold | | Swing | | |
| Conservative hold | | Swing | | |

=== Welbeck ===
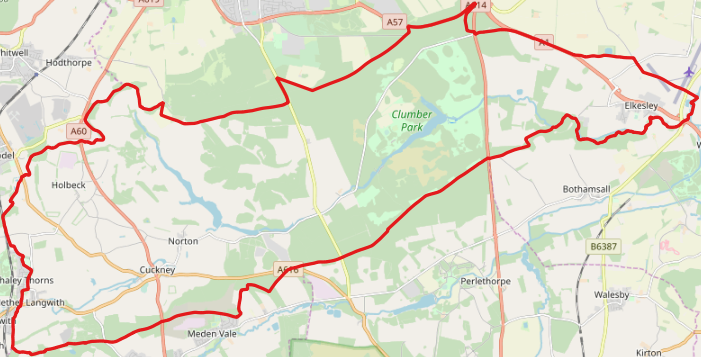
Map of Welbeck ward.

Welbeck (1)
| Party | Candidate | Votes | % | ±% |
|---|---|---|---|---|
| Labour | Charles Adams | 335 | 55.6 | ▼4.7 |
| Conservative | Matthew Evans | 241 | 40.0 | ▲0.3 |
| Liberal Democrats | Steffi Harangozo | 27 | 4.5 | N/A |
| Turnout | | 609 | 40.5 | |
| Labour hold | | Swing | ▲3.7 | |

=== Worksop East ===
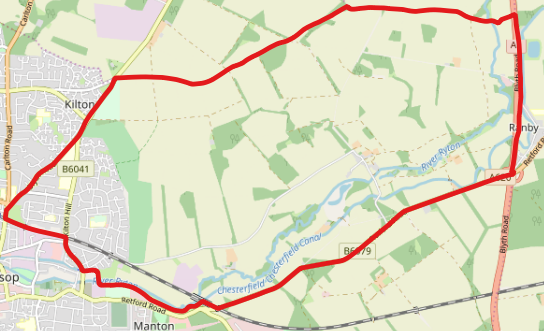
Map of Worksop East ward.

Worksop East (3)
| Party | Candidate | Votes | % | ±% |
|---|---|---|---|---|
| Labour | Jo White (inc) | 824 | 67.2 | ▲16.3 |
| Labour | Cliff Entwistle (inc) | 805 | 65.6 | ▲9.1 |
| Labour | Deborah Merryweather (inc) | 770 | 62.8 | ▲9.7 |
| Conservative | Pamela Briggs | 328 | 26.7 | ▲15.4 |
| Conservative | Tim Griffith | 287 | 23.4 | ▲12.5 |
| Conservative | Klaudia Piatek | 222 | 18.1 | ▲7.5 |
| Turnout | | 1,234 | 25.9 | ▼3.6 |
| Labour hold | | Swing | | |
| Labour hold | | Swing | | |
| Labour hold | | Swing | | |

=== Worksop North ===
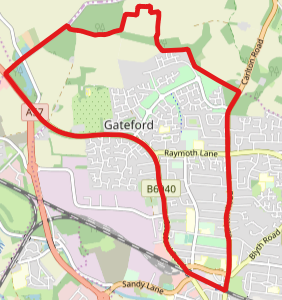
Map of Worksop North ward.

Worksop North (3)
| Party | Candidate | Votes | % | ±% |
|---|---|---|---|---|
| Labour | Maria Charlesworth (inc) | 1,072 | 54.3 | ▲1.3 |
| Labour | Neil Sanders (inc) | 1,031 | 52.2 | ▲1.1 |
| Labour | Laura Sanders | 960 | 48.6 | ▼1.5 |
| Conservative | Ben Storey | 677 | 34.3 | ▲9.4 |
| Conservative | Helen Colton | 663 | 33.6 | ▲12.7 |
| Conservative | Barry Bowles | 593 | 30.0 | ▲9.5 |
| Green | Jack Best | 281 | 14.2 | N/A |
| Liberal Democrats | Simon Russell | 168 | 8.5 | N/A |
| Turnout | | 1,982 | 26.7 | ▲1.9 |
| Labour hold | | Swing | | |
| Labour hold | | Swing | | |
| Labour hold | | Swing | | |

=== Worksop North East ===
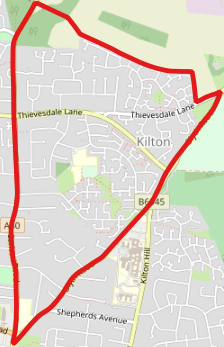
Map of Worksop North East ward.

Worksop North East (3)
| Party | Candidate | Votes | % | ±% |
|---|---|---|---|---|
| Labour | Alan Rhodes (inc) | 876 | 54.7 | ▼12.5 |
| Labour | Madelaine Richardson (inc) | 766 | 47.8 | ▼12.4 |
| Labour | Fraser Merryweather | 757 | 47.3 | ▼17.1 |
| Conservative | Rachel Briggs | 705 | 44.0 | ▲17.0 |
| Conservative | Russell Dodd | 641 | 40.0 | ▲13.2 |
| Conservative | Wyktoria Krawczyk | 536 | 33.5 | ▲7.8 |
| Turnout | | 1,615 | 32.1 | ▲4.7 |
| Labour hold | | Swing | | |
| Labour hold | | Swing | | |
| Labour hold | | Swing | | |

=== Worksop North West ===
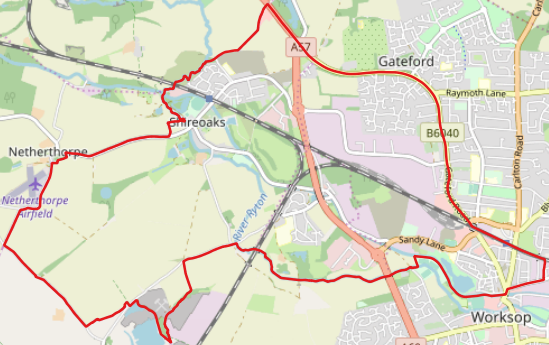
Map of Worksop North West ward.

Worksop North West (3)
| Party | Candidate | Votes | % | ±% |
|---|---|---|---|---|
| Labour | Sybil Fielding (inc) | 1,047 | 67.0 | ▲6.1 |
| Labour | David Pressley (inc) | 989 | 63.3 | ▲6.2 |
| Labour | Lynne Dixon | 948 | 60.7 | ▲6.1 |
| Conservative | Ewa Blachewicz | 405 | 25.9 | ▼3.0 |
| Conservative | Ewa Niec | 379 | 24.2 | ▲1.9 |
| Conservative | Miroslaw Zubicki | 340 | 21.8 | Steady |
| Liberal Democrats | Leon Duveen | 197 | 12.6 | N/A |
| Turnout | | 1,568 | 24.6 | ▼0.7 |
| Labour hold | | Swing | | |
| Labour hold | | Swing | | |
| Labour hold | | Swing | | |

=== Worksop South ===
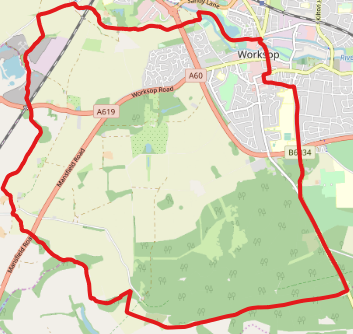
Map of Worksop South ward.

Worksop South (3)
| Party | Candidate | Votes | % | ±% |
|---|---|---|---|---|
| Labour | Julie Leigh (inc) | 1,119 | 55.7 | ▲12.2 |
| Labour | Paddy Ducey | 1,014 | 50.5 | ▲9.2 |
| Labour | Tony Eaton (inc) | 1,101 | 54.8 | ▲13.7 |
| Conservative | John Jewitt | 797 | 39.7 | ▲5.3 |
| Conservative | Ashley Penty-Williams | 763 | 38.0 | ▲5.6 |
| Conservative | Ewa Romanczuk | 674 | 33.5 | ▲1.7 |
| Turnout | | 2,022 | 36.8 | ▲2.7 |
| Labour hold | | Swing | | |
| Labour hold | | Swing | | |
| Labour hold | | Swing | | |

=== Worksop South East ===
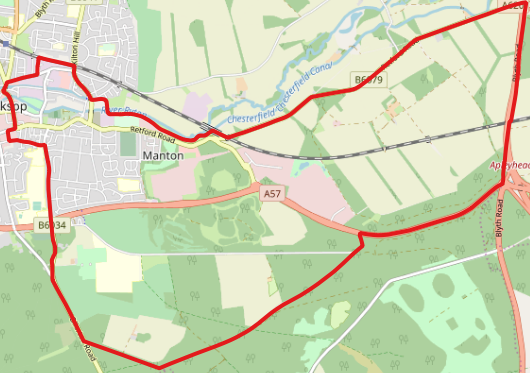
Map of Worksop South East ward.

Worksop South East (3)
| Party | Candidate | Votes | % | ±% |
|---|---|---|---|---|
| Labour | Josie Potts (inc) | 861 | 74.8 | ▲9.0 |
| Labour | John Shephard (inc) | 709 | 61.6 | ▲6.7 |
| Labour | Clayton Tindle (inc) | 700 | 60.8 | ▲4.0 |
| Conservative | Ryan Penty-Williams | 205 | 17.8 | ▲9.4 |
| Conservative | Stephen Evans | 192 | 16.7 | ▲10.6 |
| Conservative | Yvonne Evans | 192 | 16.7 | ▲11.5 |
| Turnout | | 1,160 | 21.1 | ▼4.8 |
| Labour hold | | Swing | | |
| Labour hold | | Swing | | |
| Labour hold | | Swing | | |

== Changes 2023–2027 ==
- In May 2024, Fraser Merryweather and Deborah Merryweather, both elected as Labour councillors, left the party to sit as independents. In November 2026, both Fraser Merryweather and Deborah Merryweather joined Reform UK.
- Fraser McFarland, elected as a Conservative councillor for Clayworth, became an independent in May 2024 and subsequently joined Reform UK.
- On 25 July 2024, Julie Leigh replaced James Naish as leader of the council.
- Lewis Stanniland, elected as a Conservative councillor for Tuxford and Trent, subsequently joined Reform UK.
- Simon Richardson, elected as a Conservative councillor for Rampton in July 2024, later sat as an independent before joining Reform UK on 25 February 2026.
- Jack Bowker, elected as a Labour councillor for Blyth, was suspended from the party for three months after liking social media posts from Reform UK and Restore Britain. In November 2026, he joined Reform UK.

=== By-elections ===
==== Rampton ====
The Rampton by-election followed the resignation of Conservative councillor Anthony Coultate.

Rampton by-election, 4 July 2024
| Party | Candidate | Votes | % | ±% |
|---|---|---|---|---|
| Conservative | Simon Richardson | 652 | 59.2 | −11.4 |
| Labour | Raymond Fielding | 278 | 25.2 | −4.2 |
| Liberal Democrats | Simon Russell | 172 | 15.6 | N/A |
| Majority | | 374 | 33.9 | −7.3 |
| Turnout | | 1102 | 66.7 | +34.0 |
| Registered electors | | 1,689 | | |
| Conservative hold | | Swing | | |

==== Beckingham ====
The Beckingham by-election followed the retirement of independent councillor Joan Sanger, who stood down in March 2025.

Beckingham by-election, 1 May 2025
| Party | Candidate | Votes | % | ±% |
|---|---|---|---|---|
| Reform | Warren Limber | 279 | 33.7 | N/A |
| Conservative | Tracey Taylor | 267 | 32.3 | −8.7 |
| Independent | Mark Watson | 226 | 27.3 | −31.7 |
| Liberal Democrats | Leon Duveen | 55 | 6.7 | N/A |
| Majority | | 12 | 1.5 | N/A |
| Turnout | | 827 | 40.3 | +3.4 |
| Registered electors | | 2,084 | | |
| Reform gain from Independent | | Swing | | |

==== Sturton ====
The Sturton by-election followed the resignation of Labour councillor James Naish, who had been elected as the Member of Parliament for Rushcliffe on 4 July 2024.

Sturton by-election, 1 May 2025
| Party | Candidate | Votes | % | ±% |
|---|---|---|---|---|
| Reform | Matt Turner | 331 | 43.0 | N/A |
| Conservative | James Purle | 231 | 30.0 | +7.6 |
| Labour | Colette Roberts | 139 | 18.1 | −59.5 |
| Liberal Democrats | Simon Russell | 68 | 8.8 | N/A |
| Majority | | 100 | 13.0 | N/A |
| Turnout | | 769 | 41.8 | +5.3 |
| Registered electors | | 1,854 | | |
| Reform gain from Labour | | Swing | | |

==== Ranskill ====
The Ranskill by-election followed the resignation of Conservative councillor David Bamford.

Ranskill by-election, 10 July 2025
| Party | Candidate | Votes | % | ±% |
|---|---|---|---|---|
| Reform | Andrew McCallum | 323 | 52.7 | N/A |
| Labour | Rhona Collins | 96 | 15.7 | −27.8 |
| Conservative | Owen Griffin | 89 | 14.5 | −42.0 |
| Independent | Mark Watson | 44 | 7.2 | N/A |
| Liberal Democrats | Simon Russell | 40 | 6.5 | N/A |
| Green | Margaret Hamilton | 21 | 3.4 | N/A |
| Majority | | 227 | 37.0 | N/A |
| Turnout | | 613 | 30.5 | −6.0 |
| Registered electors | | 2,012 | | |
| Reform gain from Conservative | | Swing | | |

==== East Markham ====
The by-election was triggered by the resignation of Conservative councillor Gary Dinsdale, who had attended only two council meetings that year.

East Markham by-election, 15 September 2026
| Party | Candidate | Votes | % | ±% |
|---|---|---|---|---|
| Reform | Matthew Evans | 436 | 49.6 | N/A |
| Conservative | James Purle | 250 | 28.4 | −37.6 |
| Labour | Colette Roberts | 151 | 17.2 | −4.1 |
| Green | David Bean | 42 | 4.8 | N/A |
| Rejected ballots | | 1 | 0.1 | -0.6 |
| Majority | | 186 | 21.2 | −23.6 |
| Turnout | | 880 | 42.1 | +5.8 |
| Registered electors | | 2,089 | | |
| Reform gain from Conservative | | Swing | | |

==== Worksop East ====
Worksop East by-election, 29 October 2026
| Party | Candidate | Votes | % | ±% |
|---|---|---|---|---|
| Reform | Nancy Wright | 600 | 45.9 | N/A |
| Labour | Cameron Holt | 485 | 37.1 | −34.4 |
| Restore | Anne Froggatt | 91 | 7.0 | N/A |
| Conservative | Ben Storey | 89 | 6.8 | −21.7 |
| Green | Anne Kean | 42 | 3.2 | N/A |
| Majority | | 115 | 8.8 | N/A |
| Rejected ballots | | 1 | 0.1 | |
| Turnout | | 1,308 | 26.8 | +0.9 |
| Registered electors | | 4,687 | | |
| Reform gain from Labour | | | | |
