= 2003 Bassetlaw District Council election =

2003 UK local government election

← 2002	1 May 2003	2004 →

One third of seats to Bassetlaw District Council (16 seats) 25 seats needed for a majority
- Turnout: 27.4%
	First party	Second party	Third party
	Lab	Con	Ind
Party	Labour	Conservative	Independent
Seats won	4	9	2
Seats after	25	19	2
Seat change	▼3	▲3	▲1
- No election Colours denote the winning party, as shown in the main table of results.
Council control before election
Labour
Council control after election
Labour

The 2003 Bassetlaw District Council election took place on 1 May 2003 to elect members of Bassetlaw District Council in Nottinghamshire, England as part of the 2003 United Kingdom local elections. One third of the council was up for election.

== Election result ==
The Labour Party narrowly retained control of the council with a reduced majority after losing seats to the Conservatives and an Independent.

Overall result
Party	Seats (2003)	Seats (Council)	Seats (Change)
Labour	4	25	-3
Conservative	9	19	+3
Liberal Democrats	1	2	-1
Independent	2	2	+1
Registered electors	60,560		
Votes cast	16,602		
Turnout	27.4%		

== Ward results ==
=== Blyth ===
Blyth (1)
Party	Candidate	Votes	%	±%
Conservative	Terence Yates	365	66.5%	▼3.2%
Liberal Democrats	Mark Hunter	184	33.5%	NEW
Turnout		560	30.8%	
Registered electors		1,817		
Conservative hold		Swing		

=== Carlton ===
Carlton (1)
Party	Candidate	Votes	%	±%
Conservative	David Hare	743	53.4%	▲9.1%
Labour	Gillian Freeman	649	46.6%	▼9.1%
Turnout		1,402	30.6%	
Registered electors		4,575		
Conservative gain from Labour		Swing		

=== East Markham ===
East Markham (1)
Party	Candidate	Votes	%	±%
Conservative	John Ogle	471	55.0%	▲20%
Liberal Democrats	Ann Neumann	385	45.0%	▼20%
Turnout		863	47.2%	
Registered electors		1,827		
Conservative gain from Liberal Democrats		Swing		

=== East Retford East ===
East Retford East (1)
Party	Candidate	Votes	%	±%
Conservative	James Holland	922	57.5%	▼2.3%
Labour	Philip Goodliffe	468	29.2%	▲8.4%
Liberal Democrats	Tegfryn Davies	215	13.4%	▲0.6%
Turnout		1,607	30.8%	
Registered electors		5,221		
Conservative hold		Swing		

=== East Retford North ===
East Retford North (1)
Party	Candidate	Votes	%	±%
Conservative	Michael Pugsley	819	57.0%	▲9.8%
Labour	Pamela Skelding	617	43.0%	▼9.8%
Turnout		1,442	30.6%	
Registered electors		4,712		
Conservative hold		Swing		

=== Harworth ===
Harworth (1)
Party	Candidate	Votes	%	±%
Independent	David Challinor	539	42.7%	NEW
Labour	Margaret Muskett	489	38.8%	▼22%
Independent	George Burchby	234	18.5%	▼20.7%
Turnout		1,271	22.8%	
Registered electors		5,588		
Independent gain from Labour		Swing		

=== Rampton ===
Rampton (1)
Party	Candidate	Votes	%	±%
Conservative	Jeffery Rickells	Unopposed		
Conservative hold		Swing		

=== Ranskill ===
Ranskill (1)
Party	Candidate	Votes	%	±%
Liberal Democrats	Sean Kerrigan	350	58.6%	▲0.6%
Conservative	Elizabeth Yates	247	41.4%	▼0.6%
Turnout		599	33.9%	
Registered electors		1,769		
Liberal Democrats hold		Swing		

=== Sturton ===
Sturton (1)
Party	Candidate	Votes	%	±%
Independent	Hugh Burton	555	76.0%	N/A
Conservative	Marion Smith	175	24.0%	N/A
Turnout		731	44.4%	
Registered electors		1,646		
Independent hold		Swing		

=== Welbeck ===
Welbeck (1)
Party	Candidate	Votes	%	±%
Conservative	Mary Stokes	377	58.6%	▲6.4%
Labour	Robert Payne	266	41.4%	NEW
Turnout		652	39.6%	
Registered electors		1,646		
Conservative hold		Swing		

=== Worksop East ===
Worksop East (1)
Party	Candidate	Votes	%	±%
Labour	Clifford Entwistle	745	50.3%	▲3.7%
Independent	Geoff Coe	620	41.8%	▲7.4%
Green	Paul Thorpe	117	7.9%	▼11%
Turnout		1,487	29.1%	
Registered electors		5,104		
Labour hold		Swing		

=== Worksop North ===
Worksop North (1)
Party	Candidate	Votes	%	±%
Labour	John Clayton	671	54.2%	▼6.9%
Conservative	Valerie Bowles	567	45.8%	▲6.9%
Turnout		1,249	20.8%	
Registered electors		6,015		
Labour hold		Swing		

=== Worksop North East ===
Worksop North East (1)
Party	Candidate	Votes	%	±%
Conservative	Barry Bowles	709	54.7%	▲13.2%
Labour	Janet Pimperton	588	45.3%	▼13.2%
Turnout		1,306	25.6%	
Registered electors		5,106		
Conservative gain from Labour		Swing		

=== Worksop North West ===
Worksop North West (1)
Party	Candidate	Votes	%	±%
Labour	Alan Rhodes	624	56.7%	▲2.9%
Conservative	Marilyn Parkin	288	26.2%	▼0.8%
Green	Andrew Cliffe	188	17.1%	▼2.1%
Turnout		1,104	21.9%	
Registered electors		5,046		
Labour hold		Swing		

=== Worksop South ===
Worksop South (1)
Party	Candidate	Votes	%	±%
Conservative	Juliana Smith	725	53.2%	▲1.5%
Labour	Roger Dyas-Elliott	459	33.7%	▲7.5%
Green	Rowena Jackson	179	13.1%	NEW
Turnout		1,368	26.9%	
Registered electors		5,085		
Conservative hold		Swing		

=== Worksop South East ===
Worksop South East (1)
Party	Candidate	Votes	%	±%
Labour	Laurence West	744	78.0%	▼2.0%
Conservative	Philip Smith	210	22.0%	▲2.0%
Turnout		961	17.8%	
Registered electors		5,403		
Labour hold		Swing		
