= 2004 Bassetlaw District Council election =

2004 UK local government election

← 2003	10 June 2004	2006 →

One third of seats to Bassetlaw District Council (16 seats) 25 seats needed for a majority
- Turnout: 42.1%
	First party	Second party	Third party
	Con	Lab	Ind
Party	Conservative	Labour	Independent
Seats won	10	3	3
Seats after	24	18	5
Seat change	▲5	▼7	▲3
- No election Colours denote the winning party, as shown in the main table of results.
Council control before election
No overall control
Council control after election
No overall control

The 2004 Bassetlaw District Council election took place on 10 June 2004 to elect members of Bassetlaw District Council in Nottinghamshire, England as part of the 2004 United Kingdom local elections. One third of the council was up for election.

== Election result ==
The Conservative Party won a majority of seats in the election and the Labour Party lost control of the council for the first time since 1976. Following the election, the council was under no overall control as no single party held a majority, with the Conservatives one seat short of a majority.

Overall result			
Party	Seats (2000)	Seats (Council)	Seats (Change)
Conservative	10	24	+5
Labour	3	18	-7
Liberal Democrats	0	1	-1
Independent	3	5	+3
Registered electors	67,177		
Votes cast	28,266		
Turnout	42.1%		

== Ward results ==
=== Beckingham ===
Beckingham
Party	Candidate	Votes	%	±%
Conservative	Kenneth Bullivant	610	67.5%	
Labour	Joan Sanger	294	32.5%	
Turnout		904	51.8%	
Registered electors		1,768		

=== Carlton ===
Carlton
Party	Candidate	Votes	%	±%
Conservative	Valerie Bowles	1,039	50.3%	
Labour	William Walters	1,027	49.7%	
Turnout		2,066	45.5%	
Registered electors		4,605		

=== Clayworth ===
Clayworth
Party	Candidate	Votes	%	±%
Conservative	Kathleen Sutton	702	81.5%	
Labour	Gillian Freeman	159	18.5%	
Turnout		861	55.2%	
Registered electors		1,582		

=== East Retford East ===
East Retford East
Party	Candidate	Votes	%	±%
Conservative	Michael Quigley	1,346	55.4%	
Labour	Pamela Skelding	646	26.6%	
Liberal Democrats	Lawrence Hudson	437	18.0%	
Turnout		2,426	46.0%	
Registered electors		5,308		

=== East Retford North ===
East Retford North
Party	Candidate	Votes	%	±%
Conservative	Anthony Tromans	1,084	51.9%	
Labour	James Napier	1,006	48.1%	
Turnout		2,090	44.8%	
Registered electors		4,716		

=== East Retford South ===
East Retford South
Party	Candidate	Votes	%	±%
Labour	Lionel Skelding	746	56.5%	
Conservative	Andrew Dibb	575	43.5%	
Turnout		1,321	41.4%	
Registered electors		3,259		

=== East Retford West ===
East Retford West
Party	Candidate	Votes	%	±%
Conservative	Perry Offer	575	46.0%	
Labour	James Anderson	399	31.9%	
Liberal Democrats	Tegfryn Davies	276	22.1%	
Turnout		1,250	39.1%	
Registered electors		3,212		

=== Harworth ===
Harworth
Party	Candidate	Votes	%	±%
Independent	Sharon Randall	1,137	53.4%	
Labour	Keith Muskett	993	46.6%	
Turnout		2,130	37.8%	
Registered electors		5,662		

=== Sutton ===
Sutton
Party	Candidate	Votes	%	±%
Conservative	Elizabeth Yates	572	75.1%	
Liberal Democrats	Geoffrey Chapman	190	24.9%	
Turnout		762	48.1%	
Registered electors		1,594		

=== Tuxford and Trent ===
Tuxford and Trent
Party	Candidate	Votes	%	±%
Conservative	Michael Jenkins	675	46.8%	
Labour	Albert Hunt	407	28.2%	
Liberal Democrats	Peter Lock	362	25.1%	
Turnout		1,444	45.8%	
Registered electors		3,181		

=== Worksop East ===
Worksop East
Party	Candidate	Votes	%	±%
Independent	Geoffrey Coe	1,204	54.9%	
Labour	James Elliott	988	45.1%	
Turnout		2,192	43.8%	
Registered electors		5,053		

=== Worksop North ===
Worksop North
Party	Candidate	Votes	%	±%
Labour	Allan Makeman	1,283	53.7%	
Conservative	Christopher Wanless	1,105	46.3%	
Turnout		2,388	39.6%	
Registered electors		6,117		

=== Worksop North East ===
Worksop North East
Party	Candidate	Votes	%	±%
Conservative	William Graham	1,156	50.1%	
Labour	David Walsh	1,153	49.9%	
Turnout		2,309	46.0%	
Registered electors		5,130		

=== Worksop North West ===
Worksop North West
Party	Candidate	Votes	%	±%
Independent	Ivor Jones	1,166	57.9%	
Labour	Glynn Gilfoyle	849	42.1%	
Turnout		2,015	38.9%	
Registered electors		5,277		

=== Worksop South ===
Worksop South
Party	Candidate	Votes	%	±%
Conservative	Michael Bennett	1,628	70.0%	
Labour	Roger Dyas-Elliott	697	30.0%	
Turnout		2,325	45.1%	
Registered electors		5,265		

=== Worksop South East ===
Worksop South East
Party	Candidate	Votes	%	±%
Labour	John Shephard	1,281	71.9%	
Conservative	Carole Mangham	502	28.1%	
Turnout		1,783	33.4%	
Registered electors		5,448		
