= 2002 Bassetlaw District Council election =

2002 UK local government election

- 2 May 2002

All seats to Bassetlaw District Council (48 seats) 25 seats needed for a majority
- Turnout: 29.3%
	First party	Second party	Third party
	Lab	Con	LD
Party	Labour	Conservative	Liberal Democrats
Seats after	28	16	3
	Fourth party
Party	Independent
Seats after	1
Council control before election
Labour
Council control after election
Labour

The 2002 Bassetlaw District Council election took place on 2 May 2002 to elect members of Bassetlaw District Council in Nottinghamshire, England as part of the 2002 United Kingdom local elections.

The whole council was elected due to changes to ward boundaries following an electoral review by the Boundary Committee for England.

== Election result ==
The Labour Party won a majority of seats and retained control of the council.

Overall result
Party	Seats	Seats (Change)
Labour	28	N/A
Conservative	16	N/A
Liberal Democrats	3	N/A
Independent	1	N/A
Registered electors	75,130	
Votes cast	22,009	
Turnout	29.3%	

== Ward results ==
=== Beckingham ===
Beckingham (1)
Party	Candidate	Votes	%	±%
Conservative	Kenneth Bullivant (elected unopposed)	N/A	N/A	N/A
Turnout		N/A	N/A	
Conservative win (new seat)				

=== Blyth ===
Blyth (1)
Party	Candidate	Votes	%	±%
Conservative	Terence Yates	378	69.7%	
Labour	Robert Earp	164	30.3%	
Turnout		547	30.1%	
Registered electors		1,820		
Conservative win (new seat)				

=== Carlton ===
Carlton (3)
Party	Candidate	Votes	%	±%
Labour	Alastair Williams	870	55.7%	
Labour	William Walters	868		
Labour	Jill Freeman	743		
Conservative	David Hare	692	44.3%	
Conservative	Val Bowles	586		
Conservative	Barry Bowles	577		
Turnout		1,561	33.8%	
Registered electors		4,615		
Labour win (new seat)				
Labour win (new seat)				
Labour win (new seat)				

=== Clayworth ===
Clayworth (1)
Party	Candidate	Votes	%	±%
Conservative	Kathleen Sutton	435	70.6%	
Labour	Carl Phillips	95	15.4%	
Liberal Democrats	Alison Murray	86	14.0%	
Turnout		627	39.8%	
Registered electors		1,574		
Conservative win (new seat)				

=== East Markham ===
East Markham (1)
Party	Candidate	Votes	%	±%
Liberal Democrats	Pamela Lewis	592	65.0%	
Conservative	Christopher Pataky	319	35.0%	
Turnout		913	51.0%	
Registered electors		1,789		
Liberal Democrats win (new seat)				

=== East Retford East ===
East Retford East (3)
Party	Candidate	Votes	%	±%
Conservative	Wendy Quigley	1,147	59.8%	
Conservative	Michael Quigley	1,057		
Conservative	James Holland	898		
Labour	Faith Gabbitas	399	20.8%	
Labour	Michael Gee	388		
Labour	George Gabbitas	377		
Liberal Democrats	Lawrence Hudson	245	12.8%	
Liberal Democrats	Tegfryn Davies	211		
Liberal Democrats	Mark Hunter	168		
Green	Victor Chidlaw	128	6.7%	
Turnout		1,790	34.3%	
Registered electors		5,222		
Conservative win (new seat)				
Conservative win (new seat)				
Conservative win (new seat)				

=== East Retford North ===
East Retford North (3)
Party	Candidate	Votes	%	±%
Labour	Graham Oxby	801	52.8%	
Labour	James Napier	719		
Conservative	Michael Pugsley	717	47.2%	
Conservative	Christopher Hall	690		
Labour	Pamela Skelding	590		
Turnout		1,522	32.5%	
Registered electors		4,680		
Labour win (new seat)				
Labour win (new seat)				
Conservative win (new seat)				

=== East Retford South ===
East Retford South (2)
Party	Candidate	Votes	%	±%
Labour	Carolyn Troop	591	67.6%	
Labour	Lionel Skelding	527		
Conservative	Barry Frost	283	32.4%	
Conservative	Sheelagh Hamilton	261		
Turnout		907	27.4%	
Registered electors		3,312		
Labour win (new seat)				
Labour win (new seat)				

=== East Retford West ===
East Retford West (2)
Party	Candidate	Votes	%	±%
Conservative	Marie Critchley	412	51.0%	
Labour	Jim Anderson	396	49.0%	
Conservative	Anna-Maria Robinson	378		
Labour	Philip Goodliffe	332		
Turnout		816	25.5%	
Registered electors		3,200		
Conservative win (new seat)				
Labour win (new seat)				

=== Everton ===
Everton (1)
Party	Candidate	Votes	%	±%
Conservative	Francis Martin	412	74.4%	
Labour	Jane Heggie	142	25.6%	
Turnout		557	32.1%	
Registered electors		1,735		
Conservative win (new seat)				

=== Harworth ===
Harworth (3)
Party	Candidate	Votes	%	±%
Labour	Frank Hart	806	60.8%	
Labour	Keith Muskett	783		
Labour	Margaret Muskett	718		
Independent	George Burchby	519	39.2%	
Turnout		1,284	22.9%	
Registered electors		5,599		
Labour win (new seat)				
Labour win (new seat)				
Labour win (new seat)				

=== Langold ===
Langold (1)
Party	Candidate	Votes	%	±%
Labour	Sara Jackson (elected unopposed)	N/A	N/A	N/A
Turnout		N/A	N/A	
Labour win (new seat)				

=== Misterton ===
Misterton (1)
Party	Candidate	Votes	%	±%
Labour	Jose Barry	368	65.0%	
Conservative	John Ogle	198	35.0%	
Turnout		559	30.5%	
Registered electors		1,834		
Labour win (new seat)				

=== Rampton ===
Rampton (1)
Party	Candidate	Votes	%	±%
Conservative	Jeffery Rickells (elected unopposed)	N/A	N/A	N/A
Turnout		N/A	N/A	
Conservative win (new seat)				

=== Ranskill ===
Ranskill (1)
Party	Candidate	Votes	%	±%
Liberal Democrats	Sean Kerrigan	342	58.0%	
Conservative	Carol Sharp	248	42.0%	
Turnout		602	35.8%	
Registered electors		1,684		
Liberal Democrats win (new seat)				

=== Sturton ===
Sturton (1)
Party	Candidate	Votes	%	±%
Independent	Hugh Burton (elected unopposed)	N/A	N/A	N/A
Turnout		N/A	N/A	
Independent win (new seat)				

=== Sutton ===
Sutton (1)
Party	Candidate	Votes	%	±%
Liberal Democrats	Alan Kitchen	461	70.5%	
Conservative	Elizabeth Yates	193	29.5%	
Turnout		656	41.4%	
Registered electors		1,586		
Liberal Democrats win (new seat)				

=== Tuxford and Trent ===
Tuxford and Trent (2)
Party	Candidate	Votes	%	±%
Conservative	Keith Isard	761	58.2%	
Conservative	Robert Sutton	729		
Labour	John Hobart	398	30.4%	
Labour	Carol Gee	275		
Liberal Democrats	Philip Lewis	149	11.4%	
Turnout		1,232	39.3%	
Registered electors		3,136		
Conservative win (new seat)				
Conservative win (new seat)				

=== Welbeck ===
Welbeck (1)
Party	Candidate	Votes	%	±%
Conservative	Mary Stokes	335	52.2%	
Independent	Stanley Moody	307	47.8%	
Turnout		645	38.8%	
Registered electors		1,663		
Conservative win (new seat)				

=== Worksop East ===
Worksop East (3)
Party	Candidate	Votes	%	±%
Labour	Griff Wynne	709	46.6%	
Labour	James Elliott	708		
Labour	Cliff Entwistle	688		
Independent	Geoff Coe	523	34.4%	
Green	Paul Thorpe	288	18.9%	
Turnout		1,377	26.7%	
Registered electors		5,159		
Labour win (new seat)				
Labour win (new seat)				
Labour win (new seat)				

=== Worksop North ===
Worksop North (3)
Party	Candidate	Votes	%	±%
Labour	Avril Barsley	696	61.1%	
Labour	Allan Makeman	667		
Labour	John Clayton	501		
Conservative	Marilyn Parkin	443	38.9%	
Turnout		1,196	20.2%	
Registered electors		5,933		
Labour win (new seat)				
Labour win (new seat)				
Labour win (new seat)				

=== Worksop North East ===
Worksop North East (3)
Party	Candidate	Votes	%	±%
Labour	Simon Greaves	867	58.5%	
Labour	David Walsh	658		
Labour	Janet Pimperton	652		
Conservative	Christopher Coward	614	41.5%	
Conservative	Stephen Parkin	601		
Conservative	Juliana Smith	567		
Turnout		1,593	30.9%	
Registered electors		5,156		
Labour win (new seat)				
Labour win (new seat)				
Labour win (new seat)				

=== Worksop North West ===
Worksop North West (3)
Party	Candidate	Votes	%	±%
Labour	David Pressley	740	53.8%	
Labour	Glynn Gilfoyle	728		
Labour	Alan Rhodes	668		
Conservative	Carole Mangham	372	27.0%	
Green	Andrew Cliffe	264	19.2%	
Turnout		1,234	24.5%	
Registered electors		5,032		
Labour win (new seat)				
Labour win (new seat)				
Labour win (new seat)				

=== Worksop South ===
Worksop South (3)
Party	Candidate	Votes	%	±%
Conservative	Reginald Askew	861	51.7%	
Conservative	Michael Bennett	785		
Conservative	Andrew Dibb	665		
Labour	Christopher Grocock	436	26.2%	
Independent	Michael Dunford	369	22.1%	
Labour	Sarah Gale	339		
Labour	Eileen Hart	324		
Turnout		1,379	27.9%	
Registered electors		4,947		
Conservative win (new seat)				
Conservative win (new seat)				
Conservative win (new seat)				

=== Worksop South East ===
Worksop South East (3)
Party	Candidate	Votes	%	±%
Labour	Brian Hopkinson	784	80.0%	
Labour	John Shepherd	659		
Labour	Laurence West	610		
Conservative	Philip Smith	196	20.0%	
Turnout		1,012	18.6%	
Registered electors		5,454		
Labour win (new seat)				
Labour win (new seat)				
Labour win (new seat)				
