= 2015 Bassetlaw District Council election =

2015 UK local government election

← 2014	7 May 2015	2019 →

All 48 seats to Bassetlaw District Council 25 seats needed for a majority
- Turnout: 63.7%
	First party	Second party	Third party
	Lab	Con	Ind
Leader	Simon Greaves		N/A
Party	Labour	Conservative	Independent
Seats won	33	12	3
Seat change	▼2	▲2	Steady
Popular vote	24,102	19,821	2,360
Percentage	41.1%	33.8%	4.0%
- Map of the results of the election. Colours denote the winning party, as shown in the main table of results.
Council control before election
Labour
Council control after election
Labour

The 2015 Bassetlaw District Council election took place on 7 May 2015, to elect all 48 members of Bassetlaw District Council in England. This was on the same day as the 2015 general election and other local elections.

Prior to this election, the council decided to move to all-out elections from 2015. Previously, the council had been elected by thirds with district elections being held every year except the year in which elections to Nottinghamshire County Council were held in the area. Councillors elected at this election will serve a four-year term and face re-election in 2019.

== Result summary ==
The election resulted in the Labour Party retaining its control of the council.

Bassetlaw District Council election, 2015
Party	Seats	Gains	Losses	Net gain/loss	Seats %	Votes %	Votes	+/−
Labour	33	0	2	-2		41.1	24,102	
Conservative	12	2	0	+2		33.8	19,821	
Independent	3	0	0	0		4.0	2,360	
UKIP	0	0	0	0		16.8	9,865	
Green	0	0	0	0		2.9	1,712	
Liberal Democrats	0	0	0	0		1.4	835	

== Ward results ==
=== Beckingham ===
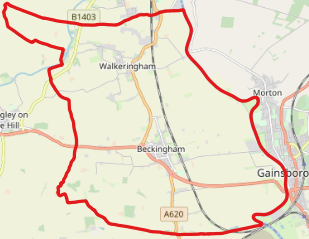
Map of Beckingham ward.

Beckingham (1)
Party	Candidate	Votes	%	±%
Independent	Joan Sanger	533	39.7	
Conservative	Raymond Simpson	428	31.9	
UKIP	Diana Capp	232	17.3	
Labour	Alec Freeman	148	11	
Turnout			72.6	
Independent hold		Swing		

=== Blyth ===
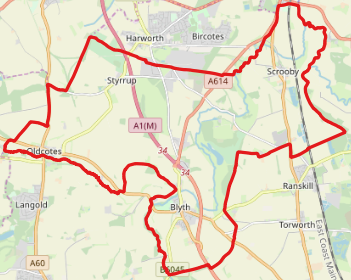
Map of Blyth ward.

Blyth (1)
Party	Candidate	Votes	%	±%
Conservative	Barry Bowles	556	44.2	
Labour	Bill Barker	435	34.6	
UKIP	Roger Vernon	208	16.5	
Liberal Democrats	Leon Duveen	58	4.6	
Turnout			69.8	
Conservative hold		Swing		

=== Carlton ===
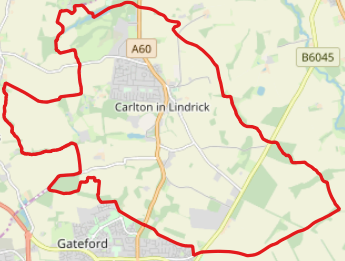
Map of Carlton ward.

Carlton (3)
Party	Candidate	Votes	%	±%
Labour	Steve Scotthorne	1,393	41.7	
Labour	Robin Carrington-Wilde	1,273		
Labour	Dave Pidwell	1,235		
Conservative	Val Bowles	1,182	35.4	
Conservative	Helen Colton	875		
UKIP	Donna Scott	763	22.9	
Turnout			66.4	
Labour hold		Swing		
Labour hold		Swing		
Labour hold		Swing		

=== Clayworth ===
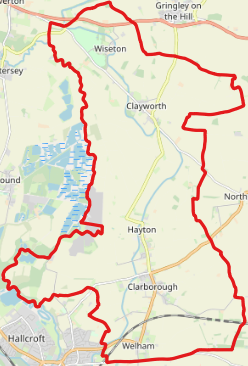
Map of Clayworth ward.

Clayworth (1)
Party	Candidate	Votes	%	±%
Conservative	Kath Sutton	846	73.2	
Labour	John Myers	310	26.8	
Turnout			76.4	
Conservative hold		Swing		

=== East Markham ===
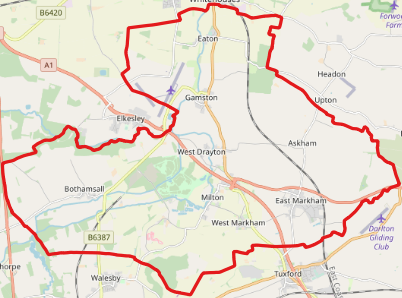
Map of East Markham ward.

East Markham (1)
Party	Candidate	Votes	%	±%
Conservative	John Ogle	1,110	76.6	
Labour	Cecily Wilde	340	23.4	
Turnout			74.9	
Conservative hold		Swing		

=== East Retford East ===
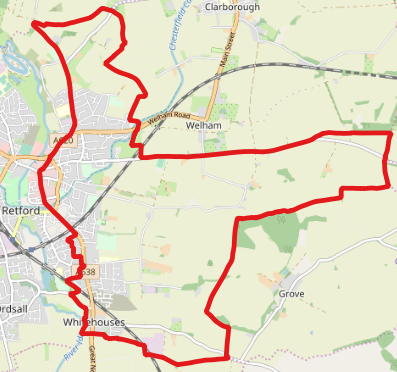
Map of East Retford East ward.

East Retford East (3)
Party	Candidate	Votes	%	±%
Conservative	Mike Quigley	1,735	45.5	
Labour	Susan Shaw	1,440	37.7	
Labour	Michael Storey	1,423		
Labour	Bill Tomlinson	1,223		
Green	Stuart Bower	640	16.8	
Turnout			66.9	
Conservative hold		Swing		
Labour hold		Swing		
Labour hold		Swing		

=== East Retford North ===
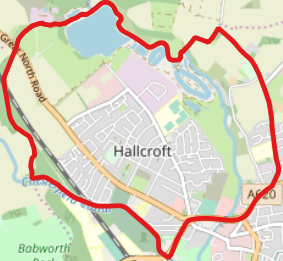
Map of East Retford North ward.

East Retford North (3)
Party	Candidate	Votes	%	±%
Labour	Graham Oxby	1,746	47.9	
Labour	Garry Clarkson	1,311		
Conservative	Anthony Tromans	1,136	31.1	
Labour	Ellen Mee	1,100		
UKIP	Deidre Vernon	766	21	
Turnout			64.3	
Labour hold		Swing		
Labour hold		Swing		
Conservative gain from Labour		Swing		

=== East Retford South ===
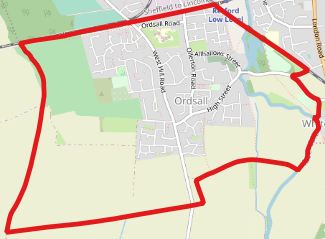
Map of East Retford South ward.

East Retford South (2)
Party	Candidate	Votes	%	±%
Labour	Carolyn Troop	1,194	50.4	
Labour	Helen Richards	1,186		
Conservative	Bryn Jones	689	29.1	
UKIP	Michael Lowe	488	20.6	
Turnout			65	
Labour hold		Swing		
Labour hold		Swing		

=== East Retford West ===
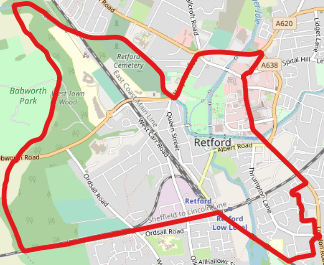
Map of East Retford West ward.

East Retford West (2)
Party	Candidate	Votes	%	±%
Labour	Alan Chambers	1,011	37.3	
Labour	Jim Anderson	889		
Conservative	Jamie Ditch	778	28.7	
UKIP	Jon Wade	576	21.2	
Liberal Democrats	Jennie Coggles	348	12.8	
Turnout			62	
Labour hold		Swing		
Labour hold		Swing		

=== Everton ===
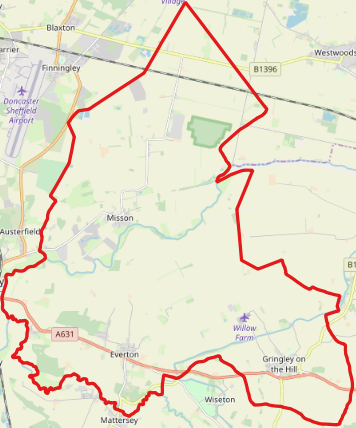
Map of Everton ward.

Everton (1)
Party	Candidate	Votes	%	±%
Conservative	Annette Simpson	780	54.9	
Labour	Peter Abell	337	23.7	
UKIP	Dave Taylor	220	15.5	
Liberal Democrats	Matan Duveen	85	6	
Turnout			74.9	
Conservative hold		Swing		

=== Harworth ===
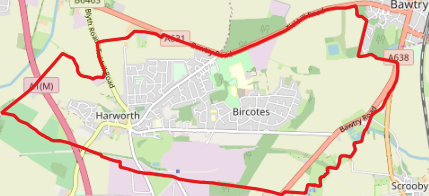
Map of Harworth ward.

Harworth (3)
Party	Candidate	Votes	%	±%
Labour	June Evans	1,976	71.1	
Labour	David Challinor	1,945		
Labour	Anita Smith	1,899		
Conservative	Robert Robson	803	28.9	
Turnout			55.6	
Labour hold		Swing		
Labour hold		Swing		
Labour hold		Swing		

=== Langold ===
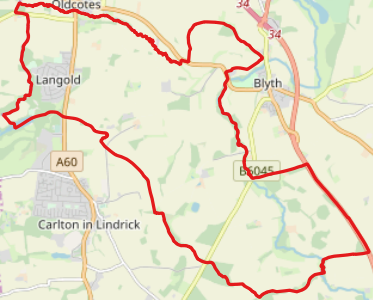
Map of Langold ward.

Langold (1)
Party	Candidate	Votes	%	±%
Labour	Jill Freeman	750	70.1	
UKIP	Kevin Blackburn	320	29.9	
Turnout			57.4	
Labour hold		Swing		

=== Misterton ===
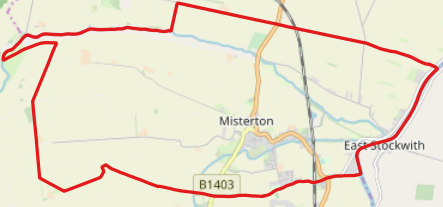
Map of Misterton ward.

Misterton (1)
Party	Candidate	Votes	%	±%
Independent	Hazel Brand	744	58.1	
Conservative	James Wood	331	25.8	
UKIP	Charles Capp	206	16.1	
Turnout			65.5	
Independent hold		Swing		

=== Rampton ===
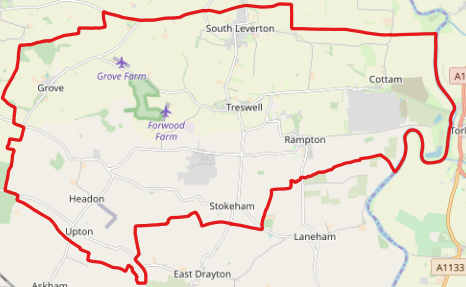
Map of Rampton ward.

Rampton (1)
Party	Candidate	Votes	%	±%
Conservative	Marie Critchley	791	69.4	
Labour	Vicky Rowbotham	349	30.6	
Turnout			71.6	
Conservative hold		Swing		

=== Ranskill ===
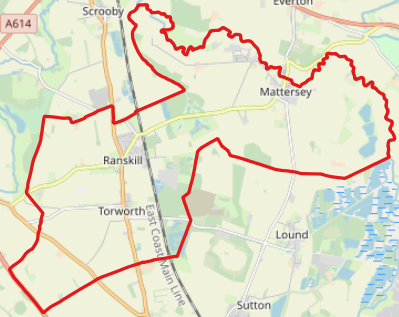
Map of Ranskill ward.

Ranskill (1)
Party	Candidate	Votes	%	±%
Conservative	Michael Gray	789	63	
Labour	Audrey Samuel	307	24.5	
Liberal Democrats	Mark Hunter	156	12.5	
Turnout			67.7	
Conservative hold		Swing		

=== Sturton ===
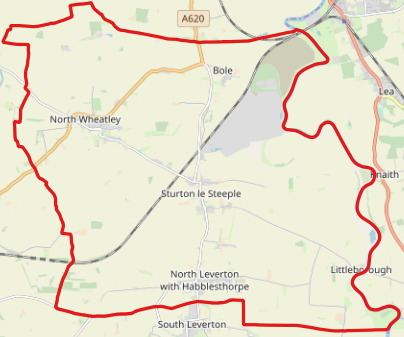
Map of Sturton ward.

Sturton (1)
Party	Candidate	Votes	%	±%
Independent	Hugh Burton	819	63.5	
Labour	Patricia Woollett	279	21.6	
Green	Doug Macdonald	191	14.8	
Turnout			71.7	
Independent hold		Swing		

=== Sutton ===
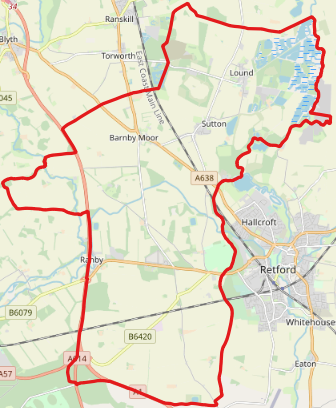
Map of Sutton ward.

Sutton (1)
Party	Candidate	Votes	%	±%
Conservative	Tracey Taylor	774	66	
Labour	Rebecca Leigh	302	25.7	
Liberal Democrats	Peter Thompson	97	8.3	
Turnout			70.8	
Conservative hold		Swing		

=== Tuxford and Trent ===
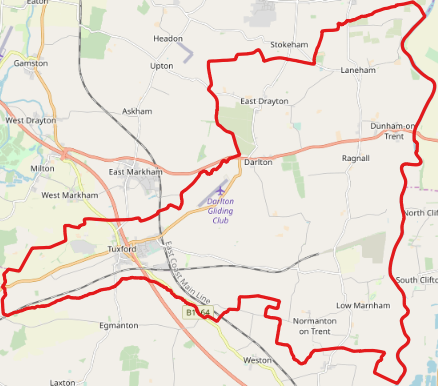
Map of Tuxford and Trent ward.

Tuxford and Trent (2)
Party	Candidate	Votes	%	±%
Conservative	Keith Isard	1,341	62.4	
Conservative	Shirley Isard	1,191		
Labour	Michelle Gregory	807	37.6	
Labour	Ross Moloney	782		
Turnout			67.9	
Conservative hold		Swing		
Conservative hold		Swing		

=== Welbeck ===
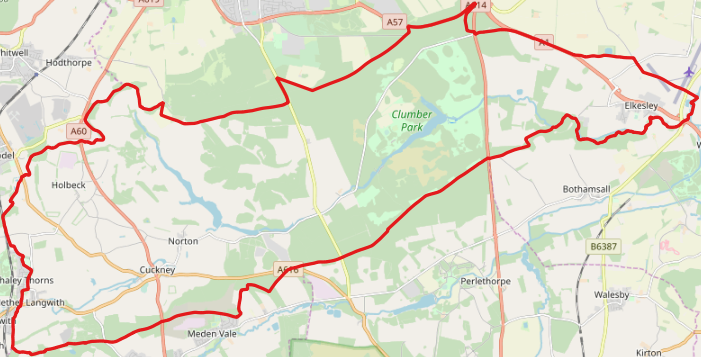
Map of Welbeck ward.

Welbeck (1)
Party	Candidate	Votes	%	±%
Labour	Kevin Dukes	479	47.2	
Conservative	Julian Watts	445	43.8	
Liberal Democrats	Helen Cooper	91	9	
Turnout			67.3	
Labour hold		Swing		

=== Worksop East ===
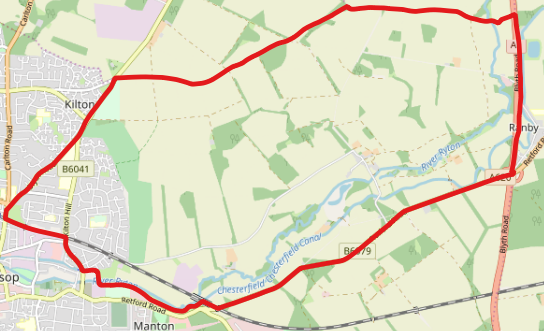
Map of Worksop East ward.

Worksop East (3)
Party	Candidate	Votes	%	±%
Labour	Cliff Entwistle	1,731	54.3	
Labour	Debbie Merryweather	1,640		
Labour	Jo White	1,435		
UKIP	Chris Barker	884	27.7	
Conservative	Richard Strickson	571	17.9	
Turnout			60.1	
Labour hold		Swing		
Labour hold		Swing		
Labour hold		Swing		

=== Worksop North ===
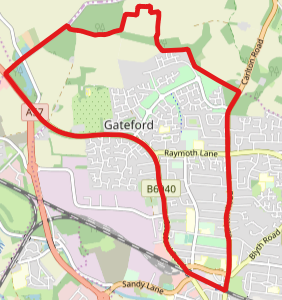
Map of Worksop North ward.

Worksop North (3)
Party	Candidate	Votes	%	±%
Labour	Sarah Farncombe	2,130	46.1	
Labour	Gwynneth Jones	1,971		
Labour	David Potts	1,731		
Conservative	Perry Offer	1,248	27	
UKIP	Rachel Briggs	1,239	26.8	
Turnout			60.8	
Labour hold		Swing		
Labour hold		Swing		
Labour hold		Swing		

=== Worksop North East ===
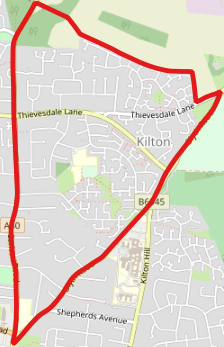
Map of Worksop North East ward.

Worksop North East (3)
Party	Candidate	Votes	%	±%
Labour	Alan Rhodes	1,632	45.3	
Labour	Simon Greaves	1,614		
Labour	Maddy Richardson	1,330		
Conservative	Emma Auckland	992	27.5	
UKIP	Tony Clayton	980	27.2	
Turnout			63.2	
Labour hold		Swing		
Labour hold		Swing		
Labour hold		Swing		

=== Worksop North West ===
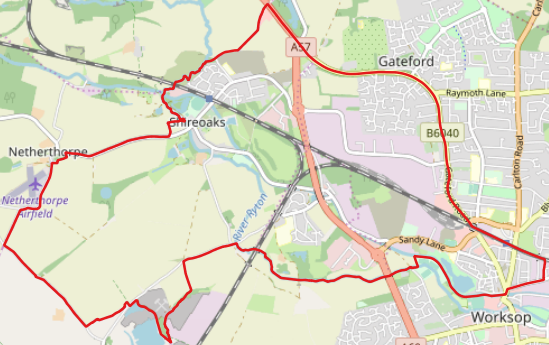
Map of Worksop North West ward.

Worksop North West (3)
Party	Candidate	Votes	%	±%
Labour	Sybil Fielding	1,746	45.6	
Labour	David Pressley	1,533		
Labour	Dean Brett	1,434		
UKIP	Ivor Jones	1,078	28.2	
Conservative	Adam Gray	1,004	26.2	
Turnout			59.1	
Labour hold		Swing		
Labour hold		Swing		
Labour hold		Swing		

=== Worksop South ===
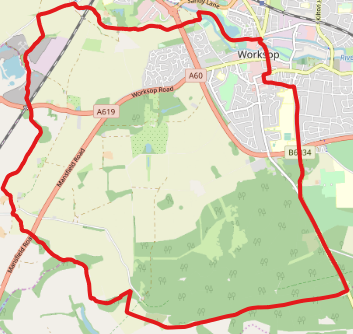
Map of Worksop South ward.

Worksop South (3)
Party	Candidate	Votes	%	±%
Conservative	Dianne Hare	1,492	32.4	
Labour	Julie Leigh	1,462	31.8	
Labour	Kevin Greaves	1,443		
UKIP	Anthony Keeling	1,098	23.9	
Labour	Geof Benson	1,069		
Green	Kris Wragg	551	12	
Turnout			64.9	
Conservative gain from Labour		Swing		
Labour hold		Swing		
Labour hold		Swing		

=== Worksop South East ===
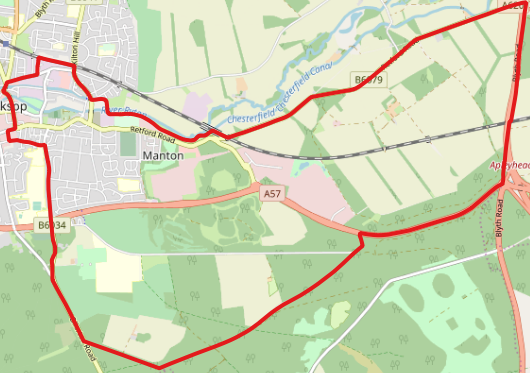
Map of Worksop South East ward.

Worksop South East (3)
Party	Candidate	Votes	%	±%
Labour	Josie Potts	1,798	56.2	
Labour	Deirdre Foley	1,632		
Labour	John Shephard	1,494		
UKIP	David Scott	807	25.2	
Green	Dan Machin	330	10.3	
Independent	Kurtis-Jay Castle	264	8.3	
Turnout			50.5	
Labour hold		Swing		
Labour hold		Swing		
Labour hold		Swing		
