= Harworth (Bassetlaw electoral ward) =

- Electoral ward
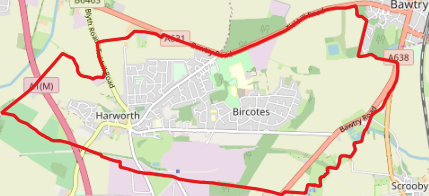
- Electorate: 6,145 (2019)
- District: Bassetlaw
- Region: East Midlands
- Country: England
- Sovereign state: United Kingdom
- Postcode district: DN11
- UK Parliament: Bassetlaw
- Councillors: 3

Harworth is an electoral ward in the district of Bassetlaw. The ward elects 3 councillors to Bassetlaw District Council using the first past the post electoral system, with each councillor serving a four-year term in office. The number of registered voters in the ward is 6,145 as of 2019.

It consists of the parish of Harworth Bircotes, which includes the settlements of Harworth and Bircotes.

The ward was created in 2002 following a review of electoral boundaries in Bassetlaw by the Boundary Committee for England.

== Councillors ==
Interactive map of ward boundaries.

The ward elects 3 councillors every four years. Prior to 2015, Bassetlaw District Council was elected by thirds with elections taking place every year except the year in which elections to Nottinghamshire County Council took place.

Election	Councillor	Councillor	Councillor
2002	Frank Hart (Labour)	Keith Muskett (Labour)	Margaret Muskett (Labour)
2003	Frank Hart (Labour)	Keith Muskett (Labour)	David Challinor (Independent)
2004	Frank Hart (Labour)	Sharon Randall (Independent)	David Challinor (Independent)
2006	Frank Hart (Labour)	Sharon Randall (Independent)	David Challinor (Independent)
2007	Frank Hart (Labour)	Sharon Randall (Independent)	John Clayton (Labour)
2008	Frank Hart (Labour)	David Challinor (Labour)	John Clayton (Labour)
2010	Frank Hart (Labour)	David Challinor (Labour)	John Clayton (Labour)
2010 by-election	Frank Hart (Labour)	David Challinor (Labour)	June Evans (Labour)
2011	Frank Hart (Labour)	David Challinor (Labour)	June Evans (Labour)
2012	Frank Hart (Labour)	David Challinor (Labour)	June Evans (Labour)
2014	Anita Smith (Labour)	David Challinor (Labour)	June Evans (Labour)
2015	Anita Smith (Labour)	David Challinor (Labour)	June Evans (Labour)
2019	Lynne Schuller (Labour)	David Challinor (Labour)	June Evans (Labour)
2023	Lynne Schuller (Labour)	Joe Horrocks (Labour)	June Evans (Labour)

== Elections ==
=== 2023 ===
Harworth (3)
Party	Candidate	Votes	%	±%
Labour	Lynne Schuller (inc)	1,058	65.1%	▼7.1%
Labour	June Evans (inc)	950		
Labour	Joe Horrocks	913		
Conservative	Jake Boothroyd	298	18.3%	▼9.5%
Conservative	Alastair Bowman	259		
Conservative	Nancy Wright	235		
Green	Sarah Whitehead	269	16.6%	NEW
Turnout		1,506	22.7%	
Labour hold		Swing		
Labour hold		Swing		
Labour hold		Swing		

=== 2019 ===
Harworth (3) 2 May 2019
Party	Candidate	Votes	%	±%
Labour	June Evans*	986	72.2%	▲1.1%
Labour	David Challinor*	961		
Labour	Lynne Schuller	940		
Conservative	Sonia Armstrong	380	27.8%	▼1.1%
Conservative	Leah Davis	369		
Conservative	Gavin McGonigle	322		
Turnout		1,532	24.9%	
Labour hold		Swing		
Labour hold		Swing		
Labour hold		Swing		

=== 2015 ===
Harworth (3) 7 May 2015
Party	Candidate	Votes	%	±%
Labour	June Evans	1,976	71.1%	
Labour	David Challinor	1,945		
Labour	Anita Smith	1,899		
Conservative	Robert Robson	803	28.9%	
Turnout			55.6%	
Labour hold		Swing		
Labour hold		Swing		
Labour hold		Swing		

=== 2014 ===
Harworth (1) 22 May 2014
Party	Candidate	Votes	%	±%
Labour	Anita Smith	1,064	76.6%	
UKIP	Peter Hewkin	169	12.2%	
Conservative	Rob Robson	156	11.2%	
Turnout				

=== 2012 ===
Harworth (1) 3 May 2012
Party	Candidate	Votes	%	±%
Labour	David Challinor	1,402	88.1%	
Conservative	Dianne Hare	190	11.9%	
Turnout			28.0%	
Labour hold		Swing		

=== 2011 ===
Harworth (1) 5 May 2011
Party	Candidate	Votes	%	±%
Labour	June Evans	1,668	82.7%	
Conservative	Dianne Hare	350	17.3%	
Turnout		2,018	35.0%	

=== 2010 by-election ===
A by-election was held on 21 October 2010 due to the resignation of John Clayton (Labour).

Harworth (1) 21 October 2010
Party	Candidate	Votes	%	±%
Labour	June Evans	1,345	82.3%	
Conservative	Tracey Taylor	182	11.1%	
Independent	Richard Bennett	68	4.2%	
Liberal Democrats	Mark Hunter	39	2.4%	
Turnout				

=== 2010 ===
Harworth (1) 6 May 2010
Party	Candidate	Votes	%	±%
Labour	Frank Hart	2,345	72.5%	
Conservative	Steve Harwood-Gray	891	27.5%	
Turnout		3,236	57.9%	

=== 2008 ===
Harworth (1) 1 May 2008
Party	Candidate	Votes	%	±%
Labour	David Challinor	1,009	64.0%	
Conservative	Tracey Taylor	568	36.0%	
Turnout		1,577	27.1%	

=== 2007 ===
Harworth (1) 3 May 2007
Party	Candidate	Votes	%	±%
Labour	John Clayton	1,066	71.2%	
Conservative	Carole Daphne Mangham	431	28.8%	
Turnout		1,497	25.9%	

=== 2006 ===
Harworth (1) 4 May 2006
Party	Candidate	Votes	%	±%
Labour	Frank Hart	798	56.2%	
Independent	Denise Challinor	623	43.8%	
Turnout			25.2%	

=== 2004 ===
Harworth (1) 10 June 2004
Party	Candidate	Votes	%	±%
Independent	Sharon Randall	1,137	53.4%	
Labour	Keith Muskett	993	46.6%	
Turnout		2,130		

=== 2003 ===
Harworth (1) 1 May 2003
Party	Candidate	Votes	%	±%
Independent	David Challinor	539	42.7%	
Labour	Margaret Muskett	489	38.8%	
Independent	George Burchby	234	18.5%	
Turnout		1,262	22.8%	

=== 2002 ===
Harworth (3) 2 May 2002
Party	Candidate	Votes	%	±%
Labour	Frank Hart	806	60.8%	
Labour	Keith Muskett	783		
Labour	Margaret Muskett	718		
Independent	George Burchby	519	39.2%	
Turnout		1,284	22.9%	
Labour win (new seat)				
Labour win (new seat)				
Labour win (new seat)				
