= Worksop North West (Bassetlaw electoral ward) =

- Electoral ward
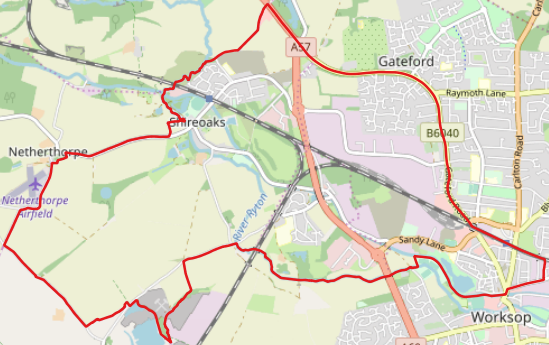
- Electorate: 5,842 (2019)
- District: Bassetlaw
- Region: East Midlands
- Country: England
- Sovereign state: United Kingdom
- Postcode district: S80
- Postcode district: S81
- UK Parliament: Bassetlaw
- Councillors: 3

Worksop North West is an electoral ward in the district of Bassetlaw. The ward elects 3 councillors to Bassetlaw District Council using the first past the post electoral system, with each councillor serving a four-year term in office. The number of registered voters in the ward is 5,842 as of 2019.

It consists of the southern area of the Gateford estate in Worksop and the villages of Rhodesia and Shireoaks.

The ward was created in 1979 following a review of ward boundaries in Bassetlaw by the Local Government Boundary Commission for England. A subsequent review of electoral arrangements in 2002 resulted in minor changes to the boundaries of the ward, although the number of councillors remained the same.

== Councillors ==
Interactive map of ward boundaries.

The ward elects 3 councillors every four years. Prior to 2015, Bassetlaw District Council was elected by thirds with elections taking place every year except the year in which elections to Nottinghamshire County Council took place.

Election	Councillor	Councillor	Councillor
1979	A. Burton (Labour)	D. Wells (Labour)	A. Williams (Labour)
1980	A. Burton (Labour)	?	A. Williams (Labour)
1982	A. Burton (Labour)	?	?
1983	A. Burton (Labour)	?	?
1984	A. Burton (Labour)	P. Field (Labour)	?
1986	A. Burton (Labour)	P. Field (Labour)	Alan Rhodes (Labour)
1987	A. Burton (Labour)	P. Field (Labour)	Alan Rhodes (Labour)
1988	A. Burton (Labour)	P. Field (Labour)	Alan Rhodes (Labour)
1990	A. Burton (Labour)	P. Field (Labour)	Alan Rhodes (Labour)
1991	David Pressley (Labour)	Glynn Gilfoyle (Labour)	Alan Rhodes (Labour)
1992	David Pressley (Labour)	Glynn Gilfoyle (Labour)	Alan Rhodes (Labour)
1994	David Pressley (Labour)	Glynn Gilfoyle (Labour)	Alan Rhodes (Labour)
1995	David Pressley (Labour)	Glynn Gilfoyle (Labour)	Alan Rhodes (Labour)
1996	David Pressley (Labour)	Glynn Gilfoyle (Labour)	Alan Rhodes (Labour)
1998	David Pressley (Labour)	Glynn Gilfoyle (Labour)	Alan Rhodes (Labour)
1999	David Pressley (Labour)	Glynn Gilfoyle (Labour)	Alan Rhodes (Labour)
2000	David Pressley (Labour)	Glynn Gilfoyle (Labour)	Alan Rhodes (Labour)
2002†	David Pressley (Labour)	Glynn Gilfoyle (Labour)	Alan Rhodes (Labour)
2003	David Pressley (Labour)	Glynn Gilfoyle (Labour)	Alan Rhodes (Labour)
2004	David Pressley (Labour)	Ivor Jones (Independent)	Alan Rhodes (Labour)
2006	David Pressley (Labour)	Ivor Jones (Independent)	Alan Rhodes (Labour)
2007	David Pressley (Labour)	Ivor Jones (Independent)	Alan Rhodes (Labour)
2008	David Pressley (Labour)	Ivor Jones (Independent)	Alan Rhodes (Labour)
2010	David Pressley (Labour)	Ivor Jones (Independent)	Alan Rhodes (Labour)
2011	David Pressley (Labour)	Ivor Jones (Independent)	Alan Rhodes (Labour)
2012	David Pressley (Labour)	Sybil Fielding (Labour)	Alan Rhodes (Labour)
2014	David Pressley (Labour)	Sybil Fielding (Labour)	Alan Rhodes (Labour)
2015	David Pressley (Labour)	Sybil Fielding (Labour)	Dean Brett (Labour)
2019	David Pressley (Labour)	Sybil Fielding (Labour)	Dean Brett (Labour)
2023	David Pressley (Labour)	Sybil Fielding (Labour)	Lynne Dixon (Labour)

† Minor changes to ward boundaries however the number of councillors remained the same.

== Elections ==
=== 2023 ===
Worksop North West (3)
Party	Candidate	Votes	%	±%
Labour	Sybil Fielding (inc)	1,047	63.5%	▼4.3%
Labour	David Pressley (inc)	989		
Labour	Lynne Dixon	948		
Conservative	Ewa Blachewicz	405	24.6%	▼7.6%
Conservative	Ewa Niec	379		
Conservative	Miroslaw Zubicki	340		
Liberal Democrats	Leon Duveen	197	11.9%	NEW
Turnout		1,568	24.6%	
Labour hold		Swing		
Labour hold		Swing		
Labour hold		Swing		

=== 2019 ===
Worksop North West (3) 2 May 2019
Party	Candidate	Votes	%	±%
Labour	Sybil Fielding*	885	67.8%	▲22.2%
Labour	David Pressley*	830		
Labour	Dean Brett*	793		
Conservative	Richard Barnes	420	32.2%	▲6%
Conservative	Tim Chapman	324		
Conservative	Pamela Briggs	317		
Turnout		1,477	25.3%	
Labour hold		Swing		
Labour hold		Swing		
Labour hold		Swing		

=== 2015 ===
Worksop North West (3) 7 May 2015
Party	Candidate	Votes	%	±%
Labour	Sybil Fielding	1,746	45.6%	
Labour	David Pressley	1,533		
Labour	Dean Brett	1,434		
UKIP	Ivor Jones	1,078	28.2%	
Conservative	Adam Gray	1,004	26.2%	
Turnout			59.1%	
Labour hold		Swing		
Labour hold		Swing		
Labour hold		Swing		

=== 2014 ===
Worksop North West (1) 22 May 2014
Party	Candidate	Votes	%	±%
Labour	David Pressley	910	56.7%	
UKIP	Ivor Jones	696	43.3%	
Turnout				

=== 2012 ===
Worksop North West (1) 3 May 2012
Party	Candidate	Votes	%	±%
Labour	Sybil Fielding	1,209	78.9%	
Conservative	James Halpin	323	21.1%	
Turnout			26.8%	

=== 2011 ===
Worksop North West (1) 5 May 2011
Party	Candidate	Votes	%	±%
Labour	Alan Rhodes	1,491	72.8%	
Conservative	Tracey Taylor	557	27.2%	
Turnout		2,048	36.2%	

=== 2010 ===
Worksop North West (1) 6 May 2010
Party	Candidate	Votes	%	±%
Labour	David Pressley	2,146	66.6%	
Conservative	Vincent Audritt	1,077	33.4%	
Turnout		3,223	60.9%	

=== 2008 ===
Worksop North West (1) 1 May 2008
Party	Candidate	Votes	%	±%
Independent	Ivor Jones	961	61.4%	
Labour	Robin Carrington-Wilde	604	38.6%	
Turnout		1,565	28.7%	

=== 2007 ===
Worksop North West (1) 3 May 2007
Party	Candidate	Votes	%	±%
Labour	Alan Rhodes	893	59.0%	
Conservative	Tracey Taylor	621	41.0%	
Turnout		1,514	27.5%	

=== 2006 ===
Worksop North West (1) 4 May 2006
Party	Candidate	Votes	%	±%
Labour	David Pressley	797	55.9%	
Conservative	Vicky Wanless	629	44.1%	
Turnout			26.3%	

=== 2004 ===
Worksop North West (1) 10 June 2004
Party	Candidate	Votes	%	±%
Independent	Ivor Jones	1,166	57.9%	
Labour	Glynn Gilfoyle	849	42.1%	
Turnout				

=== 2003 ===
Worksop North West (1) 1 May 2003
Party	Candidate	Votes	%	±%
Labour	Alan Rhodes	624	56.7%	
Conservative	Marilyn Parkin	288	26.2%	
Green	Andrew Cliffe	188	17.1%	
Turnout		1,100	21.9%	
