= Worksop East (Bassetlaw electoral ward) =

- Electoral ward
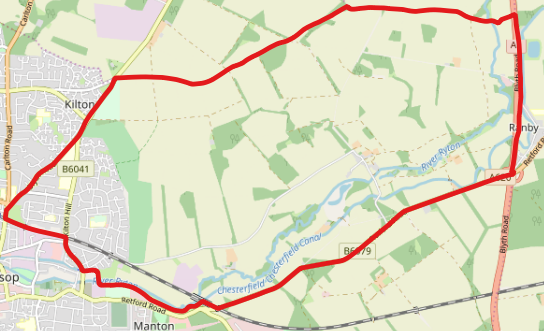
- Electorate: 5,014 (2019)
- District: Bassetlaw
- Region: East Midlands
- Country: England
- Sovereign state: United Kingdom
- Postcode district: S81
- UK Parliament: Bassetlaw
- Councillors: 3

Worksop East is an electoral ward in the district of Bassetlaw. The ward elects three councillors to Bassetlaw District Council using the first past the post electoral system, with each councillor serving a four-year term in office. The number of registered voters in the ward is 5,014 as of 2019.

It consists of the Bracebridge and Kilton areas of Worksop, and the hamlet of Scofton.

The ward was created in 1979 following a review of ward boundaries in Bassetlaw by the Local Government Boundary Commission for England. A subsequent review of electoral arrangements in 2002 resulted in minor changes to the boundaries of the ward, although the number of councillors remained the same.

== Councillors ==
Interactive map of ward boundaries.

The ward elects three councillors every four years. Prior to 2015, Bassetlaw District Council was elected by thirds with elections taking place every year except the year in which elections to Nottinghamshire County Council took place.

Election	Councillor	Councillor	Councillor
1979	D. Vickers (Labour)	R. Webster (Labour)	P. Russon (Labour)
1980	D. Vickers (Labour)	R. Webster (Labour)	P. Russon (Labour)
1982	D. Vickers (Labour)	D. Grundy (Labour)	P. Russon (Labour)
1983	D. Vickers (Labour)	D. Grundy (Labour)	P. Russon (Labour)
1984	D. Vickers (Labour)	D. Grundy (Labour)	A. Deakin (Labour)
1986	D. Vickers (Labour)	D. Grundy (Labour)	A. Deakin (Labour)
1987	G. Gilfoyle (Labour)	D. Grundy (Labour)	A. Deakin (Labour)
1988	G. Gilfoyle (Labour)	D. Grundy (Labour)	A. Deakin (Labour)
1990	G. Gilfoyle (Labour)	D. Grundy (Labour)	A. Deakin (Labour)
1991	M. Grundy (Labour)	D. Grundy (Labour)	A. Deakin (Labour)
1992	M. Grundy (Labour)	D. Grundy (Labour)	A. Deakin (Labour)
1994	M. Grundy (Labour)	Griff Wynne (Labour)	A. Deakin (Labour)
1995	M. Grundy (Labour)	Griff Wynne (Labour)	A. Deakin (Labour)
1996	M. Grundy (Labour)	Griff Wynne (Labour)	James Elliott (Labour)
1998	M. Grundy (Labour)	Griff Wynne (Labour)	James Elliott (Labour)
1999	Cliff Entwistle (Labour)	Griff Wynne (Labour)	James Elliott (Labour)
2000	Cliff Entwistle (Labour)	Griff Wynne (Labour)	James Elliott (Labour)
2002†	Cliff Entwistle (Labour)	Griff Wynne (Labour)	James Elliott (Labour)
2003	Cliff Entwistle (Labour)	Griff Wynne (Labour)	James Elliott (Labour)
2004	Cliff Entwistle (Labour)	Griff Wynne (Labour)	Geoff Coe (Independent)
2006	Cliff Entwistle (Labour)	Griff Wynne (Labour)	Geoff Coe (Independent)
2007	Cliff Entwistle (Labour)	Griff Wynne (Labour)	Geoff Coe (Independent)
2008	Cliff Entwistle (Labour)	Griff Wynne (Labour)	John Scott (Labour)
2010	Cliff Entwistle (Labour)	Griff Wynne (Labour)	John Scott (Labour)
2011	Cliff Entwistle (Labour)	Griff Wynne (Labour)	John Scott (Labour)
2012	Cliff Entwistle (Labour)	Griff Wynne (Labour)	Jo White (Labour)
2014	Cliff Entwistle (Labour)	Griff Wynne (Labour)	Jo White (Labour)
2015	Cliff Entwistle (Labour)	Debbie Merryweather (Labour)	Jo White (Labour)
2019	Cliff Entwistle (Labour)	Debbie Merryweather (Labour)	Jo White (Labour)
2023	Cliff Entwistle (Labour)	Debbie Merryweather (Labour)	Jo White (Labour)

† Minor changes to ward boundaries however the number of councillors remained the same.

== Elections ==
=== 2023 ===
Worksop East (3)
Party	Candidate	Votes	%	±%
Labour	Jo White (inc)	824	71.5%	▲20.1%
Labour	Cliff Entwistle (inc)	805		
Labour	Deborah Merryweather (inc)	770		
Conservative	Pamela Briggs	328	28.5%	▲18.2%
Conservative	Tim Griffith	287		
Conservative	Klaudia Piatek	222		
Turnout		1,234	25.9%	
Labour hold		Swing		
Labour hold		Swing		
Labour hold		Swing		

=== 2019 ===
Worksop East (3) 2 May 2019
Party	Candidate	Votes	%	±%
Labour	Cliff Entwistle*	834	51.4%	▼2.9%
Labour	Debbie Merryweather*	785		
Labour	Jo White*	767		
UKIP	David Kirton	480	29.6%	▲1.9%
Conservative	Deidre Vernon	167	10.3%	▼7.6%
Conservative	Arthur Dernie	161		
Conservative	Susan Radcliffe	156		
Liberal Democrats	Helen Cooper	143	8.8%	N/A
Turnout		1,481	29.5%	
Labour hold		Swing		
Labour hold		Swing		
Labour hold		Swing		

=== 2015 ===
Worksop East (3) 7 May 2015
Party	Candidate	Votes	%	±%
Labour	Cliff Entwistle	1,731	54.3%	
Labour	Debbie Merryweather	1,640		
Labour	Jo White	1,435		
UKIP	Chris Barker	884	27.7%	
Conservative	Richard Strickson	571	17.9%	
Turnout			60.1%	
Labour hold		Swing		
Labour hold		Swing		
Labour hold		Swing		

=== 2014 ===
Worksop East (1) 22 May 2014
Party	Candidate	Votes	%	±%
Labour	Griff Wynne	914	59.4%	
UKIP	Michael Lowe	463	30.1%	
Independent	Geoff Coe	161	10.5%	
Turnout				

=== 2012 ===
Worksop East (1) 3 May 2012
Party	Candidate	Votes	%	±%
Labour	Jo White	1135	75.1%	
Independent	Geoff Coe	376	24.9%	
Turnout			31.1%	

=== 2011 ===
Worksop East (1) 5 May 2011
Party	Candidate	Votes	%	±%
Labour	Cliff Entwistle	1,436	72.2%	
Independent	Geoff Coe	554	27.8%	
Turnout			40.6%	

=== 2010 ===
Worksop East (1) 6 May 2010
Party	Candidate	Votes	%	±%
Labour	Griff Wynne	2,090	70.1%	
Independent	Geoff Coe	893	29.9%	
Turnout			61.4%	

=== 2008 ===
Worksop East (1) 1 May 2008
Party	Candidate	Votes	%	±%
Labour	John Scott	663	41.4%	
Independent	Geoff Coe	581	36.3%	
Independent	Geoff Hurst	357	22.3%	
Turnout				

=== 2007 ===
Worksop East (1) 3 May 2007
Party	Candidate	Votes	%	±%
Labour	Cliff Entwistle	953	57.9%	
Independent	Martin Introna	692	42.1%	
Turnout			32.5%	

=== 2006 ===
Worksop East (1) 4 May 2006
Party	Candidate	Votes	%	±%
Labour	Griff Wynne	812	52.2%	
Independent	William Rodgers	744	47.8%	
Turnout			30.4%	

=== 2004 ===
Worksop East (1) 10 June 2004
Party	Candidate	Votes	%	±%
Independent	Geoff Coe	1,204	54.9%	
Labour	James Elliott	988	45.1%	
Turnout				

=== 2003 ===
Worksop East (1) 1 May 2003
Party	Candidate	Votes	%	±%
Labour	Cliff Entwistle	745	50.3%	
Independent	Geoff Coe	620	41.8%	
Green	Paul Thorpe	117	7.9%	
Turnout			29.1%	

=== 2002 ===
Worksop East (3) 2 May 2002
Party	Candidate	Votes	%	±%
Labour	Griff Wynne	709	46.6%	
Labour	James Elliott	708		
Labour	Cliff Entwistle	688		
Independent	Geoff Coe	523	34.4%	
Green	Paul Thorpe	288	18.9%	
Turnout		1,377	26.7%	
Labour win (new seat)				
Labour win (new seat)				
Labour win (new seat)				
