= East Retford East (Bassetlaw electoral ward) =

- Electoral ward
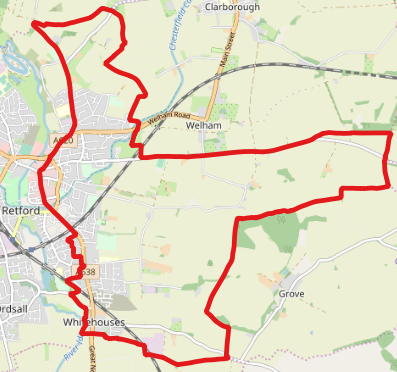
- Electorate: 5,287 (2019)
- District: Bassetlaw
- Region: East Midlands
- Country: England
- Sovereign state: United Kingdom
- Postcode district: DN22
- UK Parliament: Bassetlaw
- Councillors: 3

East Retford East is an electoral ward in the district of Bassetlaw. The ward elects 3 councillors to Bassetlaw District Council using the first past the post electoral system, with each councillor serving a four-year term in office. The number of registered voters in the ward is 5,287 as of 2019.

It consists of the eastern part of Retford, including Newtown, Whitehouses, Balk Field and Spital Hill.

The ward was created in 1979 following a review of ward boundaries in Bassetlaw by the Local Government Boundary Commission for England. A subsequent review of electoral arrangements in 2002 resulted in minor changes to the boundaries of the ward, although the number of councillors remained the same.

== Councillors ==
Interactive map of ward boundaries.

The ward elects 3 councillors every four years. Prior to 2015, Bassetlaw District Council was elected by thirds with elections taking place every year except the year in which elections to Nottinghamshire County Council took place.

Election	Councillor	Councillor	Councillor
2002	Mike Quigley (Conservative)	Wendy Quigley (Conservative)	Jim Holland (Conservative)
2003	Mike Quigley (Conservative)	Wendy Quigley (Conservative)	Jim Holland (Conservative)
2004	Mike Quigley (Conservative)	Wendy Quigley (Conservative)	Jim Holland (Conservative)
2006	Mike Quigley (Conservative)	Wendy Quigley (Conservative)	Jim Holland (Conservative)
2007	Mike Quigley (Conservative)	Wendy Quigley (Conservative)	Jim Holland (Conservative)
2008	Mike Quigley (Conservative)	Wendy Quigley (Conservative)	Jim Holland (Conservative)
2010	Mike Quigley (Conservative)	Wendy Quigley (Conservative)	Jim Holland (Conservative)
2011	Mike Quigley (Conservative)	Wendy Quigley (Conservative)	Carol Palmer (Labour)
2012	Michael Storey (Labour)	Wendy Quigley (Conservative)	Carol Palmer (Labour)
2014	Michael Storey (Labour)	Mike Quigley (Conservative)	Carol Palmer (Labour)
2015	Michael Storey (Labour)	Mike Quigley (Conservative)	Susan Shaw (Labour)
2019	Bill Tomlinson (Labour)	Mike Quigley (Conservative)	Susan Shaw (Labour)
2023	Daniel Henderson (Labour)	John Manners (Conservative)	Susan Shaw (Labour)

== Elections ==
=== 2023 ===
East Retford East (3)
Party	Candidate	Votes	%	±%
Labour	Sue Shaw (inc)	859	35.8%	▼8.1%
Labour	Daniel Henderson	795		
Conservative	John Manners	727	30.3%	▼12.2%
Conservative	Michael Hadwen	719		
Labour	Piers Digby	706		
Conservative	Liam Wildish	639		
Green	Rachel Reeves	295	12.3%	NEW
Independent	Gerald Bowers	270	11.2%	NEW
Independent	Mandy Bromley	251	10.4%	NEW
Turnout		1,932	35.0%	
Labour hold		Swing		
Labour hold		Swing		
Conservative hold		Swing		

=== 2019 ===
East Retford East (3) 2 May 2019
Party	Candidate	Votes	%	±%
Labour	Susan Shaw*	728	43.9%	▲6.2%
Conservative	Mike Quigley*	704	42.5%	▼3%
Labour	Bill Tomlinson	669		
Conservative	Martin Auckland	622		
Conservative	Richard Gill	620		
Labour	Fraser Merryweather	554		
Liberal Democrats	Karen Costello	226	13.6%	N/A
Turnout		1,610	30.5%	
Labour hold		Swing		
Conservative hold		Swing		
Labour hold		Swing		

=== 2015 ===
East Retford East (3) 7 May 2015
Party	Candidate	Votes	%	±%
Conservative	Mike Quigley	1,735	45.5%	
Labour	Susan Shaw	1,440	37.7%	
Labour	Michael Storey	1,423		
Labour	Bill Tomlinson	1,223		
Green	Stuart Bower	640	16.8%	
Turnout			66.9%	

=== 2014 ===
East Retford East (1) 22 May 2014
Party	Candidate	Votes	%	±%
Conservative	Mike Quigley	727	38.2%	
Labour	Andy Jee	702	36.9%	
UKIP	Kristian Denman	386	20.3%	
Liberal Democrats	Leon Duveen	86	4.5%	
Turnout				

=== 2012 ===
East Retford East (1) 3 May 2012
Party	Candidate	Votes	%	±%
Labour	Michael Storey	1,033	51.9%	
Conservative	Mike Quigley	842	42.3%	
Liberal Democrats	Mark Hunter	115	5.8%	
Turnout			37.3%	

=== 2011 ===
East Retford East (1) 5 May 2011
Party	Candidate	Votes	%	±%
Labour	Carol Palmer	1,264	51.6%	
Conservative	James Holland	1,187	48.4%	
Turnout			46.2%	

=== 2010 ===
East Retford East (1) 6 May 2010
Party	Candidate	Votes	%	±%
Conservative	Wendy Quigley	1,869	55%	
Labour	Jim Anderson	1,532	45%	
Turnout			65.2%	

=== 2008 ===
East Retford East (1) 1 May 2008
Party	Candidate	Votes	%	±%
Conservative	Mike Quigley	1,148	57.7%	
Independent	Michael Jenkins	422	21.2%	
Labour	Robert Clyndes	420	21.1%	
Turnout				

=== 2007 ===
East Retford East (1) 3 May 2007
Party	Candidate	Votes	%	±%
Conservative	Jim Holland	1,197	67.5%	
Labour	Pam Skelding	577	32.5%	
Turnout			32.9%	

=== 2006 ===
East Retford East (1) 4 May 2006
Party	Candidate	Votes	%	±%
Conservative	Wendy Quigley	1,467	72.7%	
Labour	Vivien Thomas	551	27.3%	
Turnout			37.3%	

=== 2004 ===
East Retford East (1) 10 June 2004
Party	Candidate	Votes	%	±%
Conservative	Mike Quigley	1,346	55.4%	
Labour	Pamela Skelding	646	26.6%	
Liberal Democrats	Lawrence Hudson	437	18%	
Turnout				

=== 2003 ===
East Retford East (1) 1 May 2003
Party	Candidate	Votes	%	±%
Conservative	Jim Holland	922	57.5%	
Labour	Philip Goodliffe	468	29.2%	
Liberal Democrats	Tegfryn Davies	215	13.4%	
Turnout			30.8%	

=== 2002 ===
East Retford East (3) 2 May 2002
Party	Candidate	Votes	%	±%
Conservative	Wendy Quigley	1,147	59.8%	
Conservative	Michael Quigley	1,057		
Conservative	James Holland	898		
Labour	Faith Gabbitas	399	20.8%	
Labour	Michael Gee	388		
Labour	George Gabbitas	377		
Liberal Democrats	Lawrence Hudson	245	12.8%	
Liberal Democrats	Tegfryn Davies	211		
Liberal Democrats	Mark Hunter	168		
Green	Victor Chidlaw	128	6.7%	
Turnout		1,790	34.3%	
Conservative win (new boundaries)				
Conservative win (new boundaries)				
Conservative win (new boundaries)				

=== 2000 ===
East Retford East (1) 4 May 2000
Party	Candidate	Votes	%	±%
Conservative	Michael Quigley	1,048	52.7%	
Liberal Democrats	Elizabeth Dobbie	573	28.8%	
Labour	Pamela Cook	366	18.4%	
Turnout			35.0%	

=== 1999 ===
East Retford East (1) 6 May 1999
Party	Candidate	Votes	%	±%
Conservative	James Holland	785	40.1%	
Labour	Lionel Skelding	734	37.5%	
Liberal Democrats	Elizabeth Dobbie	439	22.4%	
Turnout			34.3%	

=== 1998 by-election ===
East Retford East by-election 30 July 1998
Party	Candidate	Votes	%	±%
Conservative	Michael Quigley	788	54.6%	
Labour	Susan Shaw	492	34.1%	
Liberal Democrats	Elizabeth Dobbie	163	11.3%	
Turnout			24.9%	

=== 1998 ===
East Retford East (1) 7 May 1998
Party	Candidate	Votes	%	±%
Conservative	Wendy Quigley	903	49.5%	
Labour	Edith Dernie	718	39.4%	
Liberal Democrats	Alastair Murray	202	11.1%	
Turnout			31.6%	
