= Carlton (Bassetlaw electoral ward) =

- Electoral ward
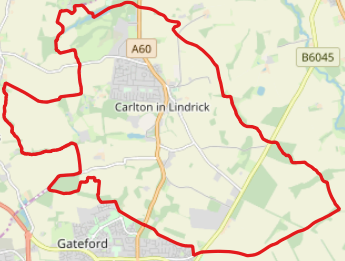
- Electorate: 4,439 (2019)
- District: Bassetlaw
- Region: East Midlands
- Country: England
- Sovereign state: United Kingdom
- Postcode district: S81
- UK Parliament: Bassetlaw
- Councillors: 3

Carlton is an electoral ward in the district of Bassetlaw. The ward elects 3 councillors to Bassetlaw District Council using the first past the post electoral system, with each councillor serving a four-year term in office. The number of registered voters in the ward is 4,439 as of 2019.

It consists of the village of Carlton in Lindrick and the hamlet of Wallingwells.

The ward was created in 2002 following a review of electoral boundaries in Bassetlaw by the Boundary Committee for England.

== Councillors ==
Interactive map of ward boundaries.

The ward elects 3 councillors every four years. Prior to 2015, Bassetlaw District Council was elected by thirds with elections taking place every year except the year in which elections to Nottinghamshire County Council took place.

Election	Councillor	Councillor	Councillor
2002	Alastair Williams (Labour)	William Walters (Labour)	Gillian Freeman (Labour)
2003	Alastair Williams (Labour)	William Walters (Labour)	David Hare (Conservative)
2004	Alastair Williams (Labour)	Val Bowles (Conservative)	David Hare (Conservative)
2006	Helen Colton (Conservative)	Val Bowles (Conservative)	David Hare (Conservative)
2007	Helen Colton (Conservative)	Val Bowles (Conservative)	David Hare (Conservative)
2008	Helen Colton (Conservative)	Val Bowles (Conservative)	David Hare (Conservative)
2010	Robin Carrington-Wilde (Labour)	Val Bowles (Conservative)	David Hare (Conservative)
2011	Robin Carrington-Wilde (Labour)	Val Bowles (Conservative)	Tina Rafferty (Labour)
2012	Robin Carrington-Wilde (Labour)	Val Bowles (Conservative)	Tina Rafferty (Labour)
2014	Robin Carrington-Wilde (Labour)	Val Bowles (Conservative)	Tina Rafferty (Labour)
2015	Robin Carrington-Wilde (Labour)	Steve Scotthorne (Labour)	David Pidwell (Labour)
2019	Robin Carrington-Wilde (Labour)	Steve Scotthorne (Labour)	David Pidwell (Labour)
2023	Robin Carrington-Wilde (Labour)	Steve Scotthorne (Labour)	David Pidwell (Labour)

== Elections ==
=== 2023 ===
Carlton (3)
Party	Candidate	Votes	%	±%
Labour	Steve Scotthorne (inc)	807	53.2%	▲4.9%
Labour	Robin Carrington-Wilde (inc)	759		
Labour	David Pidwell (inc)	738		
Conservative	Valerie Bowles	710	46.8%	▲15.4%
Conservative	Charles Lister	707		
Conservative	Callum Bailey	706		
Turnout		1,618	34.8%	
Labour hold		Swing		
Labour hold		Swing		
Labour hold		Swing		

=== 2019 ===
Carlton (3) 2 May 2019
Party	Candidate	Votes	%	±%
Labour	Steve Scotthorne*	779	48.3%	▲6.6%
Labour	David Pidwell*	644		
Labour	Robin Carrington-Wilde*	636		
Conservative	Val Bowles	506	31.4%	▼4%
Conservative	Joanne Morrison	433		
UKIP	Kevin "Of the Blackburn family"	329	20.4%	▼2.5%
Conservative	Alexandra Gregory	324		
Turnout			32.8%	
Labour hold		Swing		
Labour hold		Swing		
Labour hold		Swing		

=== 2015 ===
Carlton (3) 7 May 2015
Party	Candidate	Votes	%	±%
Labour	Steve Scotthorne	1,393	41.7%	
Labour	Robin Carrington-Wilde	1,273		
Labour	David Pidwell	1,235		
Conservative	Val Bowles	1,182	35.4%	
Conservative	Helen Colton	875		
UKIP	Donna Scott	763	22.9%	
Turnout			66.4%	
Labour hold		Swing		
Labour hold		Swing		
Labour hold		Swing		

=== 2014 ===
Carlton (1) 22 May 2014
Party	Candidate	Votes	%	±%
Labour	Robin Wilde	784	48.7%	
UKIP	Roger Martin Vernon	441	27.3%	
Conservative	Wayne Roy Clarke	386	24%	
Turnout				

=== 2012 ===
Carlton (1) 3 May 2012
Party	Candidate	Votes	%	±%
Conservative	Val Bowles	1,001	62.3%	
Labour	David Pidwell	607	37.7%	
Turnout			36.6%	

=== 2011 ===
Carlton (1) 5 May 2011
Party	Candidate	Votes	%	±%
Labour	Tina Rafferty	1,333	60.5%	
Conservative	David Alan Hare	870	39.5%	
Turnout			47.9%	

=== 2010 ===
Carlton (1) 6 May 2010
Party	Candidate	Votes	%	±%
Labour	Robin Wilde	1,628	54.8%	
Conservative	Helen Stuttard Colton	1,342	45.2%	
Turnout			65%	

=== 2008 ===
Carlton (1) 1 May 2008
Party	Candidate	Votes	%	±%
Conservative	Val Bowles	980	60.1%	
Labour	Maurice Stocks	650	39.9%	
Turnout			51.9%	

=== 2007 ===
Carlton (1) 3 May 2007
Party	Candidate	Votes	%	±%
Conservative	David Hare	903	52.1%	
Labour	Gary Moor	832	47.9%	
Turnout			37.3%	

=== 2006 ===
Carlton (1) 4 May 2006
Party	Candidate	Votes	%	±%
Conservative	Helen Colton	787	50.6%	
Labour	Gary Moore	767	49.4%	
Turnout			33.9%	

=== 2004 ===
Carlton (1) 10 June 2004
Party	Candidate	Votes	%	±%
Conservative	Val Bowles	1,039	50.3%	
Labour	William Walters	1,027	49.7%	
Turnout				

=== 2003 ===
Carlton (1) 1 May 2003
Party	Candidate	Votes	%	±%
Conservative	David Hare	743	55.4%	
Labour	Gillian Freeman	649	46.6%	
Turnout			30.6%	
