= East Retford North (Bassetlaw electoral ward) =

- Electoral ward
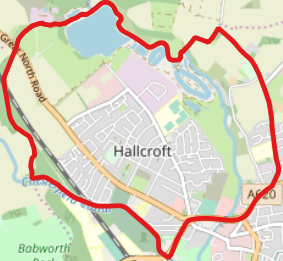
- Electorate: 5,013 (2019)
- District: Bassetlaw
- Region: East Midlands
- Country: England
- Sovereign state: United Kingdom
- Postcode district: DN22
- UK Parliament: Bassetlaw
- Councillors: 3

East Retford North is an electoral ward in the district of Bassetlaw. The ward elects 3 councillors to Bassetlaw District Council using the first past the post electoral system, with each councillor serving a four-year term in office. The number of registered voters in the ward is 5,013 as of 2019.

It consists of the Hallcroft estate in the north of Retford.

The ward was created in 1979 following a review of ward boundaries in Bassetlaw by the Local Government Boundary Commission for England. A subsequent review of electoral arrangements in 2002 resulted in minor changes to the boundaries of the ward, although the number of councillors remained the same.

== Councillors ==
Interactive map of ward boundaries.

The ward elects 3 councillors every four years. Prior to 2015, Bassetlaw District Council was elected by thirds with elections taking place every year except the year in which elections to Nottinghamshire County Council took place.

| Election | Councillor | Councillor | Councillor |
|---|---|---|---|
| 1979 | T. Hirst (Labour) | C. Grove (Labour) | P. Johnston (Labour) |
| 1980 | T. Hirst (Labour) | C. Grove (Labour) | P. Johnston (Labour) |
| 1982 | M. Quigley (Conservative) | C. Grove (Labour) | P. Johnston (Labour) |
| 1983 | M. Quigley (Conservative) | K. Straker (Conservative) | P. Johnston (Labour) |
| 1984 | M. Quigley (Conservative) | K. Straker (Conservative) | P. Johnston (Labour) |
| 1986 | Graham Oxby (Labour) | K. Straker (Conservative) | P. Johnston (Labour) |
| 1987 | Graham Oxby (Labour) | K. Straker (Conservative) | P. Johnston (Labour) |
| 1988 | Graham Oxby (Labour) | K. Straker (Conservative) | M. Pugsley (Conservative) |
| 1990 | Graham Oxby (Labour) | K. Straker (Conservative) | M. Pugsley (Conservative) |
| 1991 | Graham Oxby (Labour) | K. Straker (Conservative) | M. Pugsley (Conservative) |
| 1992 | Graham Oxby (Labour) | K. Straker (Conservative) | M. Pugsley (Conservative) |
| 1994 | Graham Oxby (Labour) | K. Straker (Conservative) | M. Pugsley (Conservative) |
| 1995 | Graham Oxby (Labour) | James Napier (Labour) | M. Pugsley (Conservative) |
| 1996 | Graham Oxby (Labour) | James Napier (Labour) | M. Storey (Labour) |
| 1998 | Graham Oxby (Labour) | James Napier (Labour) | M. Storey (Labour) |
| 1999 | Graham Oxby (Labour) | James Napier (Labour) | M. Storey (Labour) |
| 2000 | Graham Oxby (Labour) | James Napier (Labour) | Pamela Skelding (Labour) |
| 2002† | Graham Oxby (Labour) | James Napier (Labour) | Michael Pugsley (Conservative) |
| 2003 | Graham Oxby (Labour) | James Napier (Labour) | Michael Pugsley (Conservative) |
| 2004 | Graham Oxby (Labour) | Anthony Tromans (Conservative) | Michael Pugsley (Conservative) |
| 2006 | Graham Oxby (Labour) | Anthony Tromans (Conservative) | Michael Pugsley (Conservative) |
| 2007 | Graham Oxby (Labour) | Anthony Tromans (Conservative) | Michael Pugsley (Conservative) |
| 2008 | Graham Oxby (Labour) | Anthony Tromans (Conservative) | Michael Pugsley (Conservative) |
| 2010 | Graham Oxby (Labour) | Anthony Tromans (Conservative) | Michael Pugsley (Conservative) |
| 2011 | Graham Oxby (Labour) | Anthony Tromans (Conservative) | Adele Mumby (Labour) |
| 2012 | Graham Oxby (Labour) | Michelle Gregory (Labour) | Adele Mumby (Labour) |
| 2014 | Graham Oxby (Labour) | Michelle Gregory (Labour) | Adele Mumby (Labour) |
| 2015 | Graham Oxby (Labour) | Anthony Tromans (Conservative) | Garry Clarkson (Labour) |
| 2019 | Graham Oxby (Labour) | Jane Plevin (Labour) | Garry Clarkson (Labour) |
| 2023 | Graham Oxby (Labour) | David Challinor (Labour) | Jonathan Slater (Labour) |

† Minor changes to ward boundaries however the number of councillors remained the same.

== Elections ==
=== 2023 ===
East Retford North (3)
| Party | Candidate | Votes | % | ±% |
|---|---|---|---|---|
| Labour | Graham Oxby (inc) | 934 | 45.0% | ▼12.1% |
| Labour | David Challinor | 852 | | |
| Labour | Jonathan Slater | 793 | | |
| Conservative | Richard Gill | 537 | 25.9% | ▼3.9% |
| Conservative | Anthony Dexter | 505 | | |
| Conservative | Perry Offer | 437 | | |
| Independent | Mark Nicholson | 261 | 12.6% | NEW |
| Liberal Democrats | Jennie Coggles | 173 | 8.3% | ▼4.9% |
| Independent | Clifford Miller | 170 | 8.2% | NEW |
| Turnout | | 1,701 | 33.1% | |
| Labour hold | | Swing | | |
| Labour hold | | Swing | | |
| Labour hold | | Swing | | |

=== 2019 ===
East Retford North (3) 2 May 2019
| Party | Candidate | Votes | % | ±% |
|---|---|---|---|---|
| Labour | Graham Oxby* | 895 | 57.1% | ▲9.2% |
| Labour | Jane Plevin | 734 | | |
| Labour | Garry Clarkson* | 667 | | |
| Conservative | Lynda Carter | 466 | 29.7% | ▼1.4% |
| Conservative | Anthony Tromans* | 438 | | |
| Conservative | Donald Clarke | 370 | | |
| Liberal Democrats | Paul Straker | 207 | 13.2% | N/A |
| Turnout | | 1,533 | 30.6% | |
| Labour hold | | Swing | | |
| Labour hold | | Swing | | |
| Labour gain from Conservative | | Swing | | |

=== 2015 ===
East Retford North (3) 7 May 2015
| Party | Candidate | Votes | % | ±% |
|---|---|---|---|---|
| Labour | Graham Oxby | 1,746 | 47.9 | |
| Labour | Garry Clarkson | 1,311 | | |
| Conservative | Anthony Tromans | 1,136 | 31.1% | |
| Labour | Ellen Mee | 1,100 | | |
| UKIP | Deidre Vernon | 766 | 21% | |
| Turnout | | | 64.3% | |
| Labour hold | | Swing | | |
| Labour hold | | Swing | | |
| Conservative gain from Labour | | Swing | | |

=== 2014 ===
East Retford North (1) 22 May 2014
| Party | Candidate | Votes | % | ±% |
|---|---|---|---|---|
| Labour | Graham Oxby | 1,013 | 54.6% | |
| Conservative | Steve Vickers | 410 | 22.1% | |
| UKIP | Gyll Smith | 388 | 20.9% | |
| Liberal Democrats | Mark Hunter | 45 | 2.4% | |
| Turnout | | | | |

=== 2012 ===
East Retford North (1) 3 May 2012
| Party | Candidate | Votes | % | ±% |
|---|---|---|---|---|
| Labour | Michelle Gregory | 1,144 | 55.7% | |
| Conservative | Anthony Tromans | 610 | 44.3% | |
| Turnout | | | 36.4% | |

=== 2011 ===
East Retford North (1) 5 May 2011
| Party | Candidate | Votes | % | ±% |
|---|---|---|---|---|
| Labour | Adele Mumby | 1,374 | 59.9% | |
| Conservative | Mike Pugsley | 920 | 40.1% | |
| Turnout | | | 47.5% | |

=== 2010 ===
East Retford North (1) 6 May 2010
| Party | Candidate | Votes | % | ±% |
|---|---|---|---|---|
| Labour | Graham Oxby | 1,619 | 53.1% | |
| Conservative | Emma Auckland | 1,146 | 37.6% | |
| BNP | David Otter | 282 | 9.3% | |
| Turnout | | | 63.6% | |

=== 2008 ===
East Retford North (1) 1 May 2008
| Party | Candidate | Votes | % | ±% |
|---|---|---|---|---|
| Conservative | Anthony Tromans | 965 | 57.9% | |
| Labour | Pamela Skelding | 703 | 42.2% | |
| Turnout | | | | |

=== 2007 ===
East Retford North (1) 3 May 2007
| Party | Candidate | Votes | % | ±% |
|---|---|---|---|---|
| Conservative | Mike Pugsley | 1,094 | 61.4% | |
| Labour | Vaughan Thomas | 689 | 38.6% | |
| Turnout | | | 37.7% | |

=== 2006 ===
East Retford North (1) 4 May 2006
| Party | Candidate | Votes | % | ±% |
|---|---|---|---|---|
| Labour | Graham Oxby | 889 | 50.5% | |
| Conservative | Michael Gray | 873 | 49.5% | |
| Turnout | | | 36.9% | |

=== 2004 ===
East Retford North (1) 10 June 2004
| Party | Candidate | Votes | % | ±% |
|---|---|---|---|---|
| Conservative | Anthony Tromans | 1,084 | 51.9% | |
| Labour | James Napier | 1,006 | 48.1% | |
| Turnout | | | | |

=== 2003 ===
East Retford North (1) 1 May 2003
| Party | Candidate | Votes | % | ±% |
|---|---|---|---|---|
| Conservative | Michael Pugsley | 819 | 57% | |
| Labour | Pamela Skelding | 617 | 43% | |
| Turnout | | | 30.6% | |
