= Worksop South East (Bassetlaw electoral ward) =

- Electoral ward
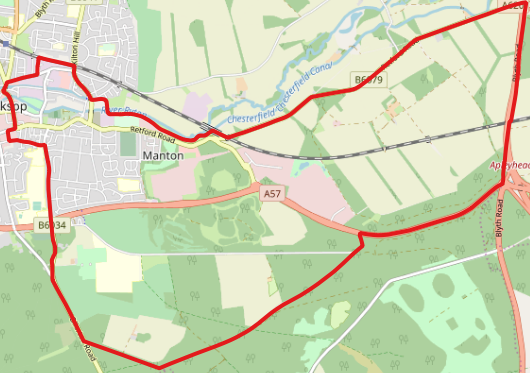
- Electorate: 5,636 (2019)
- District: Bassetlaw
- Region: East Midlands
- Country: England
- Sovereign state: United Kingdom
- Postcode district: S80
- UK Parliament: Bassetlaw
- Councillors: 3

Worksop South East is an electoral ward in the district of Bassetlaw. The ward elects 3 councillors to Bassetlaw District Council using the first past the post electoral system, with each councillor serving a four-year term in office. The number of registered voters in the ward is 5,636 as of 2019.

It consists of the southeastern part of Worksop, including the former pit village of Manton.

The ward was created in 2002 following a review of electoral boundaries in Bassetlaw by the Boundary Committee for England.

== Councillors ==
Interactive map of ward boundaries.

The ward elects 3 councillors every four years. Prior to 2015, Bassetlaw District Council was elected by thirds with elections taking place every year except the year in which elections to Nottinghamshire County Council took place.

Election	Councillor	Councillor	Councillor
2002	Brian Hopkinson (Labour)	John Shephard (Labour)	Laurence West (Labour)
2003	Brian Hopkinson (Labour)	John Shephard (Labour)	Laurence West (Labour)
2004	Brian Hopkinson (Labour)	John Shephard (Labour)	Laurence West (Labour)
2006	Brian Hopkinson (Labour)	John Shephard (Labour)	Laurence West (Labour)
2007	Brian Hopkinson (Labour)	John Shephard (Labour)	Josie Potts (Labour)
2008	Brian Hopkinson (Labour)	John Shephard (Labour)	Josie Potts (Labour)
2010	Brian Hopkinson (Labour)	John Shephard (Labour)	Josie Potts (Labour)
2011	Brian Hopkinson (Labour)	John Shephard (Labour)	Josie Potts (Labour)
2012	Brian Hopkinson (Labour)	John Shephard (Labour)	Josie Potts (Labour)
2014	Deirdre Foley (Labour)	John Shephard (Labour)	Josie Potts (Labour)
2015	Deirdre Foley (Labour)	John Shephard (Labour)	Josie Potts (Labour)
2018 by-election	Clayton Tindle (Labour)	John Shephard (Labour)	Josie Potts (Labour)
2019	Clayton Tindle (Labour)	John Shephard (Labour)	Josie Potts (Labour)
2023	Clayton Tindle (Labour)	John Shephard (Labour)	Josie Potts (Labour)

== Elections ==
=== 2023 ===
Worksop South East (3)
Party	Candidate	Votes	%	±%
Labour	Josie Potts (inc)	861	80.8%	▲23.1%
Labour	John Shephard (inc)	709		
Labour	Clayton Tindle (inc)	700		
Conservative	Ryan Penty-Williams	205	19.2%	▲11.9%
Conservative	Stephen Evans	192		
Conservative	Yvonne Evans	192		
Turnout		1,160	21.1%	
Labour hold		Swing		
Labour hold		Swing		
Labour hold		Swing		

=== 2019 ===
Worksop South East (3) 2 May 2019
Party	Candidate	Votes	%	±%
Labour	Josie Potts*	945	57.7%	▲1.5%
Labour	Clayton Tindle*	815		
Labour	John Shephard*	788		
UKIP	Ash Henderson	418	25.5%	▲0.3%
Liberal Democrats	Leon Duveen	156	9.5%	N/A
Conservative	Colin Barton †	120	7.3%	N/A
Conservative	Ethel Boddy	88		
Conservative	Angela Chambers	74		
Turnout		1,462	25.9%	
Labour hold		Swing		
Labour hold		Swing		
Labour hold		Swing		

† Colin Barton was expelled from the Conservative Party in April 2019, however he remained a nominated Conservative candidate in this election as the deadline for withdrawals had passed.

=== 2018 by-election ===
A by-election was held on 22 March 2018 due to the resignation of Deirdre Foley (Labour).

Worksop South East (1) 22 March 2018
Party	Candidate	Votes	%	±%
Labour	Clayton Tindle	1,004	77.3%	
Conservative	Lewis Stanniland	197	15.2%	
Liberal Democrats	Leon Duveen	98	7.5%	
Turnout			23.3%	

=== 2015 ===
Worksop South East (3) 7 May 2015
Party	Candidate	Votes	%	±%
Labour	Josie Potts	1,798	56.2%	
Labour	Deirdre Foley	1,632		
Labour	John Shephard	1,494		
UKIP	David Scott	807	25.2%	
Green	Dan Machin	330	10.3%	
Independent	Kurtis-Jay Castle	264	8.3%	
Turnout			50.5%	

=== 2014 ===
Worksop South East (1) 22 May 2014
Party	Candidate	Votes	%	±%
Labour	Deirdre Foley	1,071	66.6%	
UKIP	Anthony Keeling	393	24.4%	
Conservative	Nathan Gray	94	5.9%	
Liberal Democrats	Carole Thompson	50	3.1%	
Turnout				

=== 2012 ===
Worksop South East (1) 3 May 2012
Party	Candidate	Votes	%	±%
Labour	John Shephard	1,232	87.3%	
Conservative	Catherine Parrish	179	12.7%	
Turnout			24.9%	

=== 2011 ===
Worksop South East (1) 5 May 2011
Party	Candidate	Votes	%	±%
Labour	Josie Potts	1,624	85.4%	
Conservative	Catherine Parrish	277	14.6%	
Turnout		1,901	33.6%	

=== 2010 ===
Worksop South East (1) 6 May 2010
Party	Candidate	Votes	%	±%
Labour	Brian Hopkinson	2,024	74.2%	
Liberal Democrats	Mark Hunter	386	14.1%	
Conservative	Catherine Parrish	319	11.7%	
Turnout		2,729	50.9%	

=== 2008 ===
Worksop South East (1) 1 May 2008
Party	Candidate	Votes	%	±%
Labour	John Shephard	858	72.8%	
Conservative	Philip Smith	321	27.2%	
Turnout		1,179	20.8%	

=== 2007 ===
Worksop South East (1) 3 May 2007
Party	Candidate	Votes	%	±%
Labour	Josie Potts	917	73.8%	
Conservative	Philip Smith	326	26.2%	
Turnout		1,243	22.3%	

=== 2006 ===
Worksop South East (1) 4 May 2006
Party	Candidate	Votes	%	±%
Labour	Brian Hopkinson	809	69.6%	
Conservative	Maria Critchley	353	30.4%	
Turnout			21.3%	

=== 2004 ===
Worksop South East (1) 10 June 2004
Party	Candidate	Votes	%	±%
Labour	John Shephard	1,281	71.8%	
Conservative	Carole Mangham	502	28.2%	
Turnout		1,783		

=== 2003 ===
Worksop South East (1) 1 May 2003
Party	Candidate	Votes	%	±%
Labour	Laurence West	744	78.0%	
Conservative	Philip Smith	210	22.0%	
Turnout		954	17.8%	
