= Worksop North (Bassetlaw electoral ward) =

- Electoral ward
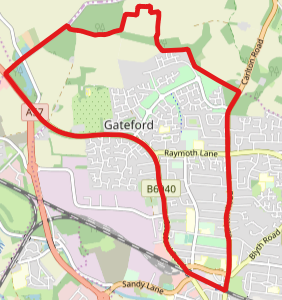
- Electorate: 6,882 (2019)
- District: Bassetlaw
- Region: East Midlands
- Country: England
- Sovereign state: United Kingdom
- Postcode district: S81
- UK Parliament: Bassetlaw
- Councillors: 3

Worksop North is an electoral ward in the district of Bassetlaw. The ward elects 3 councillors to Bassetlaw District Council using the first past the post electoral system, with each councillor serving a four-year term in office. The number of registered voters in the ward is 6,882 as of 2019.

It consists of the northern area of the Gateford estate in Worksop, between Carlton Road and Gateford Road.

The ward was created in 2002 following a review of electoral boundaries in Bassetlaw by the Boundary Committee for England.

== Councillors ==
Interactive map of ward boundaries.

The ward elects 3 councillors every four years. Prior to 2015, Bassetlaw District Council was elected by thirds with elections taking place every year except the year in which elections to Nottinghamshire County Council took place.

Election	Councillor	Councillor	Councillor
2002	Avril Barsley (Labour)	Allan Makeman (Labour)	John Clayton (Labour)
2003	Avril Barsley (Labour)	Allan Makeman (Labour)	John Clayton (Labour)
2004	Avril Barsley (Labour)	Allan Makeman (Labour)	John Clayton (Labour)
2006	Steven Burton (Conservative)	Allan Makeman (Labour)	John Clayton (Labour)
2007	Steven Burton (Conservative)	Allan Makeman (Labour)	Bill Barker (Labour)
2008	Steven Burton (Conservative)	Vicky Wanless (Conservative)	Bill Barker (Labour)
2010	David Potts (Labour)	Vicky Wanless (Conservative)	Bill Barker (Labour)
2011	David Potts (Labour)	Vicky Wanless (Conservative)	Bill Barker (Labour)
2012	David Potts (Labour)	Gwynneth Jones (Labour)	Bill Barker (Labour)
2014	David Potts (Labour)	Gwynneth Jones (Labour)	Bill Barker (Labour)
2015	David Potts (Labour)	Gwynneth Jones (Labour)	Sarah Farncombe (Labour)
2019	Maria Charlesworth (Labour)	Gwynneth Jones (Labour)	Neil Sanders (Labour)
2023	Maria Charlesworth (Labour)	Laura Sanders (Labour)	Neil Sanders (Labour)

== Elections ==
=== 2023 ===
Worksop North (3)
Party	Candidate	Votes	%	±%
Labour	Maria Charlesworth (inc)	1,072	48.8%	▼0.7%
Labour	Neil Sanders (inc)	1,031		
Labour	Laura Sanders	960		
Conservative	Ben Storey	677	30.8%	▲7.6%
Conservative	Helen Colton	663		
Conservative	Barry Bowles	593		
Green	Jack Best	281	12.8%	NEW
Liberal Democrats	Simon Russell	168	7.6%	NEW
Turnout		1,982	26.7%	
Labour hold		Swing		
Labour hold		Swing		
Labour hold		Swing		

=== 2019 ===
Worksop North (3) 2 May 2019
Party	Candidate	Votes	%	±%
Labour	Maria Charlesworth	874	49.5%	▲3.4%
Labour	Neil Sanders	843		
Labour	Gwynneth Jones	826		
UKIP	Glen Marshall	482	27.3%	▲0.5%
Conservative	Neil Dexter	410	23.2%	▼3.8%
Conservative	Alan Tonks	344		
Conservative	Roger Vernon	338		
Turnout		1,706	24.8%	
Labour hold		Swing		
Labour hold		Swing		
Labour hold		Swing		

=== 2015 ===
Worksop North (3) 7 May 2015
Party	Candidate	Votes	%	±%
Labour	Sarah Farncombe	2,130	46.1%	
Labour	Gwynneth Jones	1,971		
Labour	David Potts	1,731		
Conservative	Perry Offer	1,248	27%	
UKIP	Rachel Briggs	1,239	26.8%	
Turnout			60.8%	
Labour hold		Swing		
Labour hold		Swing		
Labour hold		Swing		

=== 2014 ===
Worksop North (1) 22 May 2014
Party	Candidate	Votes	%	±%
Labour	David Potts	980	51.4%	
UKIP	Deidre Vernon	593	31.1%	
Conservative	Perry Offer	333	17.5%	
Turnout				

=== 2012 ===
Worksop North (1) 3 May 2012
Party	Candidate	Votes	%	±%
Labour	Gwynneth Jones	1,323	76.8%	
Conservative	David Alan Hare	400	23.2%	
Turnout			25.9%	

=== 2011 ===
Worksop North (1) 5 May 2011
Party	Candidate	Votes	%	±%
Labour	Bill Barker	1,733	71.3%	
Conservative	Hannah Wright	696	28.7%	
Turnout			37.1%	

=== 2010 ===
Worksop North (1) 6 May 2010
Party	Candidate	Votes	%	±%
Labour	David Potts	2,428	62.1%	
Conservative	Peter Ashford	1,480	37.9%	
Turnout			61.7%	

=== 2008 ===
Worksop North (1) 1 May 2008
Party	Candidate	Votes	%	±%
Conservative	Vicky Wanless	907	51.8%	
Labour	David Potts	843	48.2%	
Turnout				

=== 2007 ===
Worksop North (1) 3 May 2007
Party	Candidate	Votes	%	±%
Labour	Bill Barker	981	55.2%	
Conservative	Vicky Wanless	795	44.8%	
Turnout			27.8%	

=== 2006 ===
Worksop North (1) 4 May 2006
Party	Candidate	Votes	%	±%
Conservative	Steven Geoffrey Burton	881	53.6%	
Labour	Vaughan Thomas	763	46.4%	
Turnout			25.9%	

=== 2004 ===
Worksop North (1) 10 June 2004
Party	Candidate	Votes	%	±%
Labour	Allan Makeman	1,283	53.7%	
Conservative	Christopher Wanless	1,105	46.3%	
Turnout				

=== 2003 ===
Worksop North (1) 1 May 2003
Party	Candidate	Votes	%	±%
Labour	John Clayton	671	54.2%	
Conservative	Valerie Bowles	567	45.8%	
Turnout			20.8%	
