= Worksop South (Bassetlaw electoral ward) =

- Electoral ward
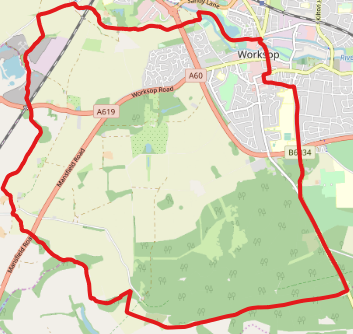
- Electorate: 5,636 (2019)
- District: Bassetlaw
- Region: East Midlands
- Country: England
- Sovereign state: United Kingdom
- Postcode district: S80
- UK Parliament: Bassetlaw
- Councillors: 3

Worksop South is an electoral ward in the district of Bassetlaw. The ward elects 3 councillors to Bassetlaw District Council using the first past the post electoral system, with each councillor serving a four-year term in office. The number of registered voters in the ward is 5,636 as of 2019.

It consists of the southern part of Worksop, including the St. Anne's Estate.

The ward was created in 2002 following a review of electoral boundaries in Bassetlaw by the Boundary Committee for England.

== Councillors ==
Interactive map of ward boundaries.

The ward elects 3 councillors every four years. Prior to 2015, Bassetlaw District Council was elected by thirds with elections taking place every year except the year in which elections to Nottinghamshire County Council took place.

| Election | Councillor | Councillor | Councillor |
|---|---|---|---|
| 2002 | Reginald Askew (Conservative) | Michael Bennett (Conservative) | Andrew Dibb (Conservative) |
| 2003 | Reginald Askew (Conservative) | Michael Bennett (Conservative) | Juliana Smith (Conservative) |
| 2004 | Reginald Askew (Conservative) | Michael Bennett (Conservative) | Juliana Smith (Conservative) |
| 2006 | Chris Wanless (Conservative) | Michael Bennett (Conservative) | Juliana Smith (Conservative) |
| 2007 | Chris Wanless (Conservative) | Michael Bennett (Conservative) | Juliana Smith (Conservative) |
| 2008 | Chris Wanless (Conservative) | Michael Bennett (Conservative) | Juliana Smith (Conservative) |
| 2010 | Chris Wanless (Conservative) | Michael Bennett (Conservative) | Juliana Smith (Conservative) |
| 2010 by-election | Chris Wanless (Conservative) | Sylvia May (Labour) | Juliana Smith (Conservative) |
| 2011 | Chris Wanless (Conservative) | Sylvia May (Labour) | Julie Leigh (Labour) |
| 2012 | Chris Wanless (Conservative) | Sylvia May (Labour) | Julie Leigh (Labour) |
| 2014 | Kevin Greaves (Labour) | Sylvia May (Labour) | Julie Leigh (Labour) |
| 2015 | Kevin Greaves (Labour) | Dianne Hare (Conservative) | Julie Leigh (Labour) |
| 2019 | Kevin Greaves (Labour) | Tony Eaton (Labour) | Julie Leigh (Labour) |
| 2023 | Paddy Ducey (Labour) | Tony Eaton (Labour) | Julie Leigh (Labour) |

== Elections ==
=== 2023 ===
Worksop South (3)
| Party | Candidate | Votes | % | ±% |
|---|---|---|---|---|
| Labour | Julie Leigh (inc) | 1,119 | 58.4% | ▲16.2% |
| Labour | Paddy Ducey | 1,014 | | |
| Labour | Tony Eaton (inc) | 1,011 | | |
| Conservative | John Jewitt | 797 | 41.6% | ▲8.2% |
| Conservative | Ashley Penty-Williams | 763 | | |
| Conservative | Ewa Romanczuk | 674 | | |
| Turnout | | 2,022 | 36.8% | |
| Labour hold | | Swing | | |
| Labour hold | | Swing | | |
| Labour hold | | Swing | | |

=== 2019 ===
Worksop South (3) 2 May 2019
| Party | Candidate | Votes | % | ±% |
|---|---|---|---|---|
| Labour | Julie Leigh* | 832 | 42.2% | ▲10.4% |
| Labour | Kevin Greaves* | 790 | | |
| Labour | Tony Eaton | 766 | | |
| Conservative | Rachel Briggs | 657 | 33.4% | ▲1% |
| Conservative | Helen Colton | 619 | | |
| Conservative | Lewis Stanniland | 608 | | |
| Independent | Nigel Turner | 481 | 24.4% | N/A |
| Turnout | | 1,919 | 34.1% | |
| Registered electors | | 5,636 | | |
| Labour gain from Conservative | | Swing | | |
| Labour hold | | Swing | | |
| Labour hold | | Swing | | |

=== 2015 ===
Worksop South (3) 7 May 2015
| Party | Candidate | Votes | % | ±% |
|---|---|---|---|---|
| Conservative | Dianne Hare | 1,492 | 32.4% | |
| Labour | Julie Leigh | 1,462 | 31.8% | |
| Labour | Kevin Greaves | 1,443 | | |
| UKIP | Anthony Keeling | 1,098 | 23.9% | |
| Labour | Geof Benson | 1,069 | | |
| Green | Kris Wragg | 551 | 12% | |
| Turnout | | | 64.9% | |

=== 2014 ===
Worksop South (1) 22 May 2014
| Party | Candidate | Votes | % | ±% |
|---|---|---|---|---|
| Labour | Kevin Greaves | 795 | 42.1% | |
| Conservative | Adam Gray | 524 | 27.7% | |
| UKIP | Dave Scott | 498 | 26.4% | |
| Liberal Democrats | Peter Thompson | 72 | 3.8% | |
| Turnout | | | | |

=== 2012 ===
Worksop South (1) 3 May 2012
| Party | Candidate | Votes | % | ±% |
|---|---|---|---|---|
| Labour | Sylvia May | 985 | 54.9% | |
| Conservative | Alec Thorpe | 635 | 35.4% | |
| Liberal Democrats | Leon Duveen | 174 | 9.7% | |
| Turnout | | 1,794 | 33.1% | |
| Registered electors | | 5,469 | | |

=== 2011 ===
Worksop South (1) 5 May 2011
| Party | Candidate | Votes | % | ±% |
|---|---|---|---|---|
| Labour | Julie Leigh | 1,274 | 53.8% | |
| Conservative | Alec Thorpe | 993 | 41.9% | |
| Liberal Democrats | Leon Duveen | 101 | 4.3% | |
| Turnout | | 2,368 | 43.7% | |
| Registered electors | | 5,462 | | |

=== 2010 by-election ===
A by-election was held on 16 September 2010 due to the death of Michael Bennett (Conservative).

Worksop South (1) 16 September 2010
| Party | Candidate | Votes | % | ±% |
|---|---|---|---|---|
| Labour | Sylvia May | 815 | 52.0% | |
| Conservative | Alex Thorpe | 669 | 42.7% | |
| Liberal Democrats | Leon Duveen | 84 | 5.4% | |
| Turnout | | 1,568 | 28.5% | |

=== 2010 ===
Worksop South (1) 6 May 2010
| Party | Candidate | Votes | % | ±% |
|---|---|---|---|---|
| Conservative | Chris Wanless | 1,823 | 53.3% | |
| Labour | Kevin Greaves | 1,600 | 46.8% | |
| Turnout | | 3,423 | 62.4% | |
| Registered electors | | 5,359 | | |

=== 2008 ===
Worksop South (1) 1 May 2008
| Party | Candidate | Votes | % | ±% |
|---|---|---|---|---|
| Conservative | Michael Bennett | 1,372 | 78.2% | |
| Labour | Eileen Hart | 383 | 21.8% | |
| Turnout | | 1,755 | 32.0% | |
| Registered electors | | 5,518 | | |

=== 2007 ===
Worksop South (1) 3 May 2007
| Party | Candidate | Votes | % | ±% |
|---|---|---|---|---|
| Conservative | Julie Smith | 1,217 | 67.5% | |
| Labour | Mick Golding | 587 | 32.5% | |
| Turnout | | 1,804 | 33.5% | |
| Registered electors | | 5,466 | | |

=== 2006 ===
Worksop South (1) 4 May 2006
| Party | Candidate | Votes | % | ±% |
|---|---|---|---|---|
| Conservative | Chris Wanless | 1,114 | 60.5% | |
| Labour | Rory Palmer | 728 | 39.5% | |
| Turnout | | 1,842 | 34.6% | |
| Registered electors | | 5,457 | | |

=== 2004 ===
Worksop South (1) 10 June 2004
| Party | Candidate | Votes | % | ±% |
|---|---|---|---|---|
| Conservative | Michael Bennett | 1,628 | 70.0% | |
| Labour | Roger Dyas-Elliott | 697 | 30.0% | |
| Turnout | | 2,325 | 45.1% | |
| Registered electors | | 5,265 | | |

=== 2003 ===
Worksop South (1) 1 May 2003
| Party | Candidate | Votes | % | ±% |
|---|---|---|---|---|
| Conservative | Juliana Smith | 725 | 53.2% | |
| Labour | Roger Dyas-Elliott | 459 | 33.7% | |
| Green | Rowena Jackson | 179 | 13.1% | |
| Turnout | | 1,363 | 26.9% | |
| Registered electors | | 5,085 | | |
