= Worksop North East (Bassetlaw electoral ward) =

- Electoral ward
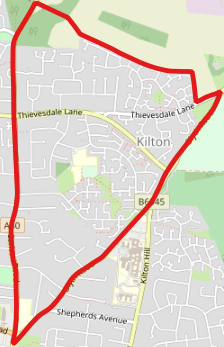
- Electorate: 4,946 (2019)
- District: Bassetlaw
- Region: East Midlands
- Country: England
- Sovereign state: United Kingdom
- Postcode district: S81
- UK Parliament: Bassetlaw
- Councillors: 3

Worksop North East is an electoral ward in the district of Bassetlaw. The ward elects 3 councillors to Bassetlaw District Council using the first past the post electoral system, with each councillor serving a four-year term in office. The number of registered voters in the ward is 4,946 as of 2019.

It consists of the Prospect, Thievesdale and Sunnyside areas of Worksop, between Blyth Road and Carlton Road.

The ward was created in 2002 following a review of electoral boundaries in Bassetlaw by the Boundary Committee for England.

== Councillors ==
Interactive map of ward boundaries.

The ward elects 3 councillors every four years. Prior to 2015, Bassetlaw District Council was elected by thirds with elections taking place every year except the year in which elections to Nottinghamshire County Council took place.

Election	Councillor	Councillor	Councillor
2002	Simon Greaves (Labour)	David Walsh (Labour)	Janet Pimperton (Labour)
2003	Simon Greaves (Labour)	David Walsh (Labour)	Barry Bowles (Conservative)
2004	Simon Greaves (Labour)	Bill Graham (Conservative)	Barry Bowles (Conservative)
2006	Joseph Hayward (Conservative)	Bill Graham (Conservative)	Barry Bowles (Conservative)
2007	Joseph Hayward (Conservative)	Bill Graham (Conservative)	Simon Greaves (Labour)
2008	Joseph Hayward (Conservative)	Bill Graham (Conservative)	Simon Greaves (Labour)
2010	Shirley Toms (Labour)	Bill Graham (Conservative)	Simon Greaves (Labour)
2011 by-election	Shirley Toms (Labour)	John Anderton (Labour)	Simon Greaves (Labour)
2011	Shirley Toms (Labour)	John Anderton (Labour)	Simon Greaves (Labour)
2012	Shirley Toms (Labour)	Rebecca Leigh (Labour)	Simon Greaves (Labour)
2014	Maddy Richardson (Labour)	Rebecca Leigh (Labour)	Simon Greaves (Labour)
2015	Maddy Richardson (Labour)	Alan Rhodes (Labour)	Simon Greaves (Labour)
2019	Maddy Richardson (Labour)	Alan Rhodes (Labour)	Simon Greaves (Labour)
2023	Maddy Richardson (Labour)	Alan Rhodes (Labour)	Fraser Merryweather (Labour)

== Elections ==
=== 2023 ===
Worksop North East (3)
Party	Candidate	Votes	%	±%
Labour	Alan Rhodes (inc)	876	55.4%	▼15.9%
Labour	Maddy Richardson (inc)	766		
Labour	Fraser Merryweather	757		
Conservative	Rachel Briggs	705	44.6%	▲15.9%
Conservative	Russell Dodd	641		
Conservative	Wyktoria Krawczyk	536		
Turnout		1,615	32.1%	
Labour hold		Swing		
Labour hold		Swing		
Labour hold		Swing		

=== 2019 ===
Worksop North East (3) 2 May 2019
Party	Candidate	Votes	%	±%
Labour	Alan Rhodes*	863	71.3%	▲26%
Labour	Simon Greaves*	828		
Labour	Maddy Richardson*	774		
Conservative	Alec Thorpe	347	28.7%	▲1.2%
Conservative	Matthew Peck	344		
Conservative	John Anderson	330		
Turnout		1,355	27.4%	
Labour hold		Swing		
Labour hold		Swing		
Labour hold		Swing		

=== 2015 ===
Worksop North East (3) 7 May 2015
Party	Candidate	Votes	%	±%
Labour	Alan Rhodes	1,632	45.3%	
Labour	Simon Greaves	1,614		
Labour	Maddy Richardson	1,330		
Conservative	Emma Auckland	992	27.5%	
UKIP	Tony Clayton	980	27.2%	
Turnout			63.2%	
Labour hold		Swing		
Labour hold		Swing		
Labour hold		Swing		

=== 2014 ===
Worksop North East (1) 22 May 2014
Party	Candidate	Votes	%	±%
Labour	Maddy Richardson	868	53.5%	
UKIP	Tony Clayton	467	28.8%	
Conservative	Emma Aukland	288	17.7%	
Turnout				

=== 2012 ===
Worksop North East (1) 3 May 2012
Party	Candidate	Votes	%	±%
Labour	Rebecca Leigh	1,265	77%	
Conservative	Emma Auckland	378	33%	
Turnout			32.9%	

=== 2011 ===
Worksop North East (1) 5 May 2011
Party	Candidate	Votes	%	±%
Labour	Simon Greaves	1,630	73.2%	
Conservative	Raymond Simpson	598	26.8%	
Turnout		2,228	44.3%	

=== 2011 by-election ===
A by-election was held on 10 February 2011 following the disqualification of Bill Graham (Conservative) due to non-attendance at council meetings.

Worksop North East (1) 10 February 2011
Party	Candidate	Votes	%	±%
Labour	John Anderton	1,198	74%	
Conservative	Barry Bowles	317	19.6%	
Independent	Geoff Coe	75	4.6%	
Liberal Democrats	Mark Hunter	28	1.7%	
Turnout				

=== 2010 ===
Worksop North East (1) 6 May 2010
Party	Candidate	Votes	%	±%
Labour	Shirley Toms	2,110	64.1%	
Conservative	Alec Thorpe	1,184	35.9%	
Turnout			67.2%	

=== 2008 ===
Worksop North East (1) 1 May 2008
Party	Candidate	Votes	%	±%
Conservative	Bill Graham	926	53.3%	
Labour	Shirley Toms	813	46.7%	
Turnout			34.3%	

=== 2007 ===
Worksop North East (1) 3 May 2007
Party	Candidate	Votes	%	±%
Labour	Simon Greaves	905	52.6%	
Conservative	Barry Bowles	816	47.4%	
Turnout			34.2%	

=== 2006 ===
Worksop North East (1) 4 May 2006
Party	Candidate	Votes	%	±%
Conservative	Joseph Hayward	832	50.8%	
Labour	Simon Greaves	807	49.2%	
Turnout			32.3%	

=== 2004 ===
Worksop North East (1) 10 June 2004
Party	Candidate	Votes	%	±%
Conservative	Bill Graham	1,156	50.1%	
Labour	David Walsh	1,153	49.9%	
Turnout				

=== 2003 ===
Worksop North East (1) 1 May 2003
Party	Candidate	Votes	%	±%
Conservative	Barry Bowles	709	54.7%	
Labour	Janet Pimperton	588	45.3%	
Turnout			25.6%	
