= East Retford West (Bassetlaw electoral ward) =

- Electoral ward
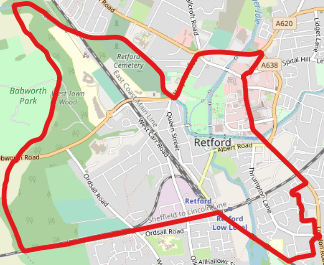
- Electorate: 3,740 (2019)
- District: Bassetlaw
- Region: East Midlands
- Country: England
- Sovereign state: United Kingdom
- Postcode district: DN22
- UK Parliament: Bassetlaw
- Councillors: 2

East Retford West is an electoral ward in the district of Bassetlaw. The ward elects two councillors to Bassetlaw District Council using the first past the post electoral system, with each councillor serving a four-year term in office. The number of registered voters in the ward is 3,740 as of 2019.

It consists of the northern part of the village of Ordsall in Retford, Thrumpton and the western part of Retford town centre.

The ward was created in 2002 following a review of electoral boundaries in Bassetlaw by the Boundary Committee for England.

== Councillors ==
Interactive map of ward boundaries.

The ward elects 2 councillors every four years. Prior to 2015, Bassetlaw District Council was elected by thirds with elections taking place every year except the year in which elections to Nottinghamshire County Council took place.

Election	Councillor	Councillor
2002	Marie Critchley (Conservative)	Jim Anderson (Labour)
2004	Marie Critchley (Conservative)	Perry Offer (Conservative)
2006	Margaret Skelton (Conservative)	Perry Offer (Conservative)
2008	Margaret Skelton (Conservative)	Perry Offer (Conservative)
2010	Ian Campbell (Labour)	Perry Offer (Conservative)
2012	Ian Campbell (Labour)	Alan Chambers (Labour)
2014	Ian Campbell (Labour)	Alan Chambers (Labour)
2015	Jim Anderson (Labour)	Alan Chambers (Labour)
2018 by-election	Jim Anderson (Labour)	Matthew Callingham (Labour)
2019	Jim Anderson (Labour)	Helen Tamblyn-Saville (Liberal Democrats)
2023	Harriet Digby (Labour)	Malachi Carroll (Labour)

== Elections ==
=== 2023 ===
East Retford West (2)
Party	Candidate	Votes	%	±%
Labour	Harriet Digby	477	37.5%	▲4.4%
Labour	Malachi Carroll	459		
Liberal Democrats	Helen Tamblyn-Saville (inc)	401	31.5%	▲0.4%
Conservative	James Purle	316	24.8%	▲5.0%
Conservative	Karen Dexter	288		
Liberal Democrats	Phil Ray	235		
Independent	Jon Wade	78	6.1%	NEW
Turnout		1,209	31.6%	
Labour hold		Swing		
Labour gain from Liberal Democrats		Swing		

=== 2019 ===
East Retford West (2) 2 May 2019
Party	Candidate	Votes	%	±%
Labour	Jim Anderson*	394	33.1%	▼4.2%
Liberal Democrats	Helen Tamblyn-Saville	371	31.1%	▲18.3%
Labour	Matthew Callingham	364		
Conservative	Ashley Burnell	236	19.8%	▼8.9%
Independent	Marie Critchley	191	16%	N/A
Liberal Democrats	Stephen Ware	164		
Conservative	Ashraf Syed Abdul Cader	142		
Turnout		1,062	28.4%	
Labour hold		Swing		
Liberal Democrats gain from Labour		Swing		

=== 2018 by-election ===
A by-election was held on 15 November 2018 following the disqualification of Alan Chambers (Labour) due to non-attendance at council meetings.

East Retford West (1) 15 November 2018
Party	Candidate	Votes	%	±%
Labour	Matthew Callingham	441	49.9%	
Conservative	Emma Auckland	296	33.5%	
Liberal Democrats	Helen Tamblyn-Saville	146	16.5%	
Turnout				
Labour hold		Swing		

=== 2015 ===
East Retford West (2) 7 May 2015
Party	Candidate	Votes	%	±%
Labour	Alan Chambers	1,011	37.3%	
Labour	Jim Anderson	889		
Conservative	Jamie Ditch	778	28.7%	
UKIP	Jon Wade	576	21.2%	
Liberal Democrats	Jennie Coggles	348	12.8%	
Turnout			62%	
Labour hold		Swing		
Labour hold		Swing		

=== 2014 ===
East Retford West (1) 22 May 2014
Party	Candidate	Votes	%	±%
Labour	Ian Campbell	544	48.5%	
UKIP	Jon Wade	292	26.1%	
Conservative	Jamie Ditch	232	20.7%	
Liberal Democrats	Jennifier Coggles	53	4.7%	
Turnout				

=== 2012 ===
East Retford West (1) 3 May 2012
Party	Candidate	Votes	%	±%
Labour	Alan Chambers	707	66.7%	
Conservative	Graham Ince	353	33.3%	
Turnout			31.1%	

=== 2010 ===
East Retford West (1) 6 May 2010
Party	Candidate	Votes	%	±%
Labour	Ian Campbell	782	37.9%	
Conservative	Chris Hollands	767	37.2%	
Liberal Democrats	David Hassett	515	25%	
Turnout			57.5%	

=== 2008 ===
East Retford West (1) 1 May 2008
Party	Candidate	Votes	%	±%
Conservative	Perry Offer	570	63.8%	
Labour	Rod Pickford	324	36.2%	
Turnout			25.8%	

=== 2006 ===
East Retford West (1) 4 May 2006
Party	Candidate	Votes	%	±%
Conservative	Margaret Skelton	602	65.5%	
Labour	James Napier	317	34.5%	
Turnout			28.8%	

=== 2004 ===
East Retford West (1) 10 June 2004
Party	Candidate	Votes	%	±%
Conservative	Perry Offer	575	46%	
Labour	James Anderson	399	31.9%	
Liberal Democrats	Tegfryn Davies	276	22.1%	
Turnout				
