= Everton (Bassetlaw electoral ward) =

- Electoral ward
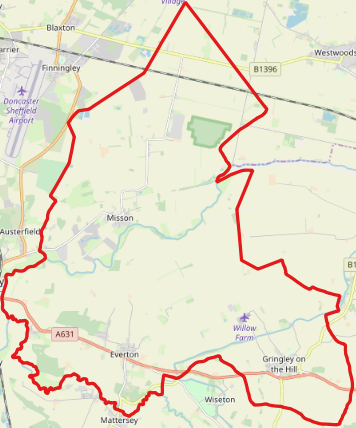
- Electorate: 1,997 (2019)
- District: Bassetlaw
- Region: East Midlands
- Country: England
- Sovereign state: United Kingdom
- Postcode district: DN10
- UK Parliament: Bassetlaw
- Councillors: 1

Everton is an electoral ward in the district of Bassetlaw. The ward elects one councillor to Bassetlaw District Council using the first past the post electoral system for a four-year term in office. The number of registered voters in the ward is 1,997 as of 2019.

It consists of the villages of Everton, Gringley on the Hill, Misson and Scaftworth.

The ward was created in 1979 following a review of ward boundaries in Bassetlaw by the Local Government Boundary Commission for England.

== Councillors ==
Interactive map of ward boundaries.

The ward elects one councillor every four years. Prior to 2015, Bassetlaw District Council was elected by thirds with elections taking place every year except the year in which elections to Nottinghamshire County Council took place.

Election	Councillor
1979	P. Wilde (Conservative)
1982	P. Wilde (Conservative)
1986	P. Wilde (Conservative)
1990	G. Troop (Conservative)
1994	Francis Martin (Conservative)
1998	Francis Martin (Conservative)
2002	Francis Martin (Conservative)
2006	Annette Simpson (Conservative)
2010	Annette Simpson (Conservative)
2014	Annette Simpson (Conservative)
2015	Annette Simpson (Conservative)
2019	Mark Watson (Independent)
2023	Steve Pashley (Conservative)

== Elections ==
=== 2023 ===
Everton (1)
Party	Candidate	Votes	%	±%
Conservative	Steve Pashley	386	50.9%	▲7.7%
Independent	Mark Watson (inc)	372	49.1%	▼7.7%
Turnout		765	38.1%	
Conservative gain from Independent		Swing		

=== 2019 ===
Everton (1) 2 May 2019
Party	Candidate	Votes	%	±%
Independent	Mark Watson	405	56.8%	N/A
Conservative	Annette Simpson*	308	43.2%	▼11.7
Turnout		718	36%	
Independent gain from Conservative		Swing		

=== 2015 ===
Everton (1) 7 May 2015
Party	Candidate	Votes	%	±%
Conservative	Annette Simpson	780	54.9%	
Labour	Peter Abell	337	23.7%	
UKIP	Dave Taylor	220	15.5%	
Liberal Democrats	Matan Duveen	85	6.0%	
Turnout			74.9%	

=== 2014 ===
Everton (1) 22 May 2014
Party	Candidate	Votes	%	±%
Conservative	Anette Simpson	360	50.7%	
UKIP	Diana Capp	166	23.4%	
Labour	Sarah Farncombe	145	20.4%	
Liberal Democrats	Darren Burr	39	5.5%	
Turnout				

=== 2010 ===
Everton (1) 6 May 2010
Party	Candidate	Votes	%	±%
Conservative	Annette Simpson	732	56.4%	
Independent	Chris Stringer	566	43.6%	
Turnout		1,298	72.9%	

=== 2006 ===
Everton (1) 4 May 2006
Party	Candidate	Votes	%	±%
Conservative	Annette Simpson	484	59.4%	
BNP	David Otter	177	21.7%	
Labour	Philip Goodliffe	154	18.9%	
Turnout			46.7%	
