= Clayworth (Bassetlaw electoral ward) =

- Electoral ward
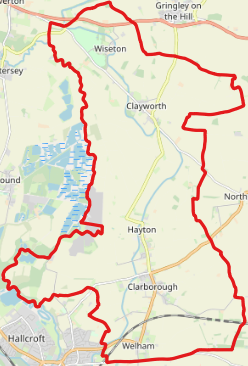
- Electorate: 1,530 (2019)
- District: Bassetlaw
- Region: East Midlands
- Country: England
- Sovereign state: United Kingdom
- Postcode district: DN22
- UK Parliament: Bassetlaw
- Councillors: 1

Clayworth is an electoral ward in the district of Bassetlaw. The ward elects one councillor to Bassetlaw District Council using the first past the post electoral system for a four-year term in office. The number of registered voters in the ward is 1,530 as of 2019.

It consists of the villages of Clayworth, Clarborough, Hayton and Wiseton.

The ward was created in 2002 following a review of electoral boundaries in Bassetlaw by the Boundary Committee for England.

== Councillors ==
Interactive map of ward boundaries.

The ward elects one councillor every four years. Prior to 2015, Bassetlaw District Council was elected by thirds with elections taking place every year except the year in which elections to Nottinghamshire County Council took place.

Election	Councillor
2002	Kath Sutton (Conservative)
2004	Kath Sutton (Conservative)
2008	Kath Sutton (Conservative)
2012	Kath Sutton (Conservative)
2015	Kath Sutton (Conservative)
2019	Ben Sofflet (Independent)
2023	Fraser McFarland (Conservative)

== Elections ==
=== 2023 ===
Clayworth (1)
Party	Candidate	Votes	%	±%
Conservative	Fraser McFarland	307	51.7%	▲7.9%
Independent	Ben Sofflet (inc)	287	48.3%	▼7.9%
Turnout		599	39.3%	
Conservative gain from Independent		Swing		

=== 2019 ===
Clayworth (1) 2 May 2019
Party	Candidate	Votes	%	±%
Independent	Ben Sofflet	315	56.3%	N/A
Conservative	Drew Smith	245	43.8%	▼29.5
Turnout			37.7%	
Independent gain from Conservative		Swing		

=== 2015 ===
Clayworth (1) 7 May 2015
Party	Candidate	Votes	%	±%
Conservative	Kath Sutton	846	73.2%	
Labour	John Myers	310	26.8%	
Turnout			76.4%	
Conservative hold		Swing		

=== 2012 ===
Clayworth (1) 3 May 2012
Party	Candidate	Votes	%	±%
Conservative	Kath Sutton	408	69.3%	
Labour	Gavin Briers	181	30.7%	
Turnout			38.6%	
Conservative hold				

=== 2008 ===
Clayworth (1) 1 May 2008
Party	Candidate	Votes	%	±%
Conservative	Kath Sutton	1,148	76.6%	
BNP	David Otter	243	16.2%	
Labour	Philip Goodliffe	107	7.1%	
Turnout			36.9%	

=== 2004 ===
Clayworth (1) 10 June 2004
Party	Candidate	Votes	%	±%
Conservative	Kath Sutton	702	81.5%	
Labour	Gillian Freeman	159	18.5%	
Turnout				
