= Bassetlaw (constituency) =

Parliamentary constituency in the United Kingdom, 1885 onwards

Coordinates: 53.40°N 0.95°W

- County constituency for the House of Commons
- Interactive map of boundaries since 2024
- Location within the East Midlands
- County: Nottinghamshire
- Population: 123,808 (2011 census)
- Electorate: 75,773 (March 2020)
- Major settlements: Worksop, Retford, Harworth

Current constituency
- Created: 1885
- Member of Parliament: Jo White (Labour)
- Seats: One
- Created from: North Nottinghamshire

Bassetlaw /ˈbæsɪtˌlɔː/ is a parliamentary constituency (Note: A county constituency (for the purposes of election expenses and type of returning officer)) in Nottinghamshire, represented in the House of Commons of the UK Parliament since the 2024 general election by Jo White, a Labour Party candidate. (Note: As with all constituencies, the constituency elects one Member of Parliament (MP) by the first past the post system of election at least every five years.) Before the 2019 general election, the seat had been part of the so-called "red wall", being held by the Labour Party since 1935 before falling to the Conservative Party.

== Constituency profile ==
The Bassetlaw constituency is located in the north of Nottinghamshire and covers most of the Bassetlaw local government district. It is mostly rural and includes the towns of Worksop, Retford and Harworth Bircotes as well as the surrounding villages.

Worksop and the western parts of the constituency have a history of coal mining, whilst Retford and the eastern parts are predominantly agricultural. This is reflected in the most recent district council elections in 2023, where the west of the constituency elected entirely Labour Party councillors whilst the north-east saw more Conservative Party support . Residents of the constituency are less wealthy and less likely to have a degree-level education than national averages, and white people make up 96% of the population. Voters in Bassetlaw overwhelmingly supported leaving the European Union in the 2016 referendum, with an estimated 68% voting in favour of Brexit.

== Boundaries ==
=== Historic ===
2010-2024: Following its review of parliamentary boundaries in Nottinghamshire, the Boundary Commission for England made changes to the constituency for the 2010 general election to allow for population changes, most noticeably by returning the town of Retford from Newark, offset by moving the small town of Market Warsop into Mansfield constituency.

The constituency included 22 electoral wards from Bassetlaw District Council:

- Beckingham, Blyth, Carlton, Clayworth, East Retford East, East Retford North, East Retford South, East Retford West, Everton, Harworth, Langold, Misterton, Ranskill, Sturton, Sutton, Welbeck, Worksop East, Worksop North, Worksop North East, Worksop North West, Worksop South, Worksop South East.

=== Current ===
Further to the 2023 review of Westminster constituencies which came into effect for the 2024 general election, the constituency has 20 wards from Bassetlaw District council:

Beckingham, Blyth, Carlton, East Retford East, East Retford North, East Retford South, East Retford West, Everton, Harworth, Langold, Misterton, Ranskill, Sutton, Welbeck, Worksop East, Worksop North, Worksop North East, Worksop North West, Worksop South, Worksop South East.

The two small wards of Clayworth and Sturton were transferred to Newark.

== History ==
The constituency was created in 1885 by the Redistribution of Seats Act.

In March 2024, Cameron Holt was elected as the Member of UK Youth Parliament for Bassetlaw.

=== History of boundaries ===
Map of boundaries 2010-2024

The Bassetlaw Division (named after one of the ancient Wapentakes of the county) as originally created in 1885 consisted of the municipal borough of East Retford, the petty sessional divisions of Retford and Worksop and part of Mansfield petty sessional division.

In 1918, the number of parliamentary divisions in Nottinghamshire was increased from four to five, with resulting changes in boundaries. Bassetlaw Division was now defined as containing the Municipal Borough of East Retford, the Urban Districts of Warsop and Worksop, and the Rural Districts of Blyth & Cuckney, Misterton and East Retford, with the civil parish of Sookholme from Skegby Rural District.

In 1950, the five Parliamentary Divisions of Nottinghamshire were reorganised as six County Constituencies. Local government boundary changes in the 1930s now meant that Bassetlaw County Constituency was defined as comprising the Municipal Boroughs of East Retford and Worksop, the Urban District of Warsop and the Rural Districts of East Retford and Worksop.

In 1955, the Urban District of Warsop was moved into the Mansfield constituency.

The constituency's boundaries then remained unchanged until 1983. In that year, the town of East Retford and the neighbouring areas were transferred to the redrawn Newark constituency. Bassetlaw constituency then comprised Worksop and surrounding areas in the Bassetlaw district as well as the town of Warsop in the Mansfield district (see list of wards during this period below). There were no boundary changes in 1997.

From 1983 to 2010, the constituency comprised the following Bassetlaw district wards:

- Beckingham, Blyth, Carlton, Clayworth, Everton, Harworth East, Harworth West, Hodsock, Misterton, Rampton, Ranskill, Sturton, Sutton, Welbeck, Worksop East, Worksop North, Worksop North East, Worksop North West, Worksop South, Worksop South East

along with two Mansfield district wards:

- Birklands, Meden (both in the Warsop area).

In 2010 the two Mansfield District wards were transferred to the Mansfield constituency and the town of Retford was regained from Newark.

Bassetlaw constituency boundaries, shown within the county of Nottinghamshire

1885 to 1918

1950 to 1983

1983 to 2010

2010 to 2024

=== Electoral history ===
Election results for Bassetlaw (1892 - 2019)

On a historical measure, this had been a very safe seat for the Labour Party before 2019, with their own or related candidates having held it since the 1929 general election. On a size-of-majority measure, it was a low to medium safe seat. Its first Member of Parliament Malcolm MacDonald was one of the few Labour MPs to join his father Ramsay MacDonald's National Government. MacDonald held the seat as a National Labour candidate in the 1931 election, but was defeated at the next election in 1935 by Labour's Frederick Bellenger.

Bellenger held the seat until he died in 1968. A by-election followed. The seat was retained for the Labour Party by Joe Ashton with a slender 1.72% majority, the narrowest since the 1920s. He held the seat until retirement at the 2001 general election. He was succeeded at that year's election by fellow Labour politician John Mann, who retained the seat at the next four elections. In 2019, Mann resigned being having been appointed to head a government inquiry on tackling anti-Semitism and to take a seat in the House of Lords. The Labour candidate initially chosen to replace Mann, Sally Gimson, was deselected before the election by the party's National Executive Committee over what were described as "very serious allegations". Gimson referred to the process as a "kangaroo court", and Mann called the decision a stitch-up; Gimson started legal action against the party, but dropped the case several days later. Keir Morrison, a councillor in the Ashfield District, replaced Gimson as the Labour candidate.

In the December 2019 general election, the Conservatives won the seat with a swing from Labour of 18.4%, the largest recorded in the election. The fall in Labour's vote, 24.9%, was the greatest of any seat in the election.

In the 2024 General Election, Jo White, the wife of John Mann, regained the seat for Labour on a swing of 19.6%.

== Members of Parliament ==
Election	Member	Party
1885	William Beckett-Denison	Conservative
1890	Frederick Milner	Conservative
1906	Frank Newnes	Liberal
1910	Ellis Hume-Williams	Conservative
1929	Malcolm MacDonald	Labour
1931	Malcolm MacDonald	National Labour
1935	Frederick Bellenger	Labour
1968 by-election	Joe Ashton	Labour
2001	John Mann	Labour
2019	Brendan Clarke-Smith	Conservative
2024	Jo White	Labour

== Elections ==
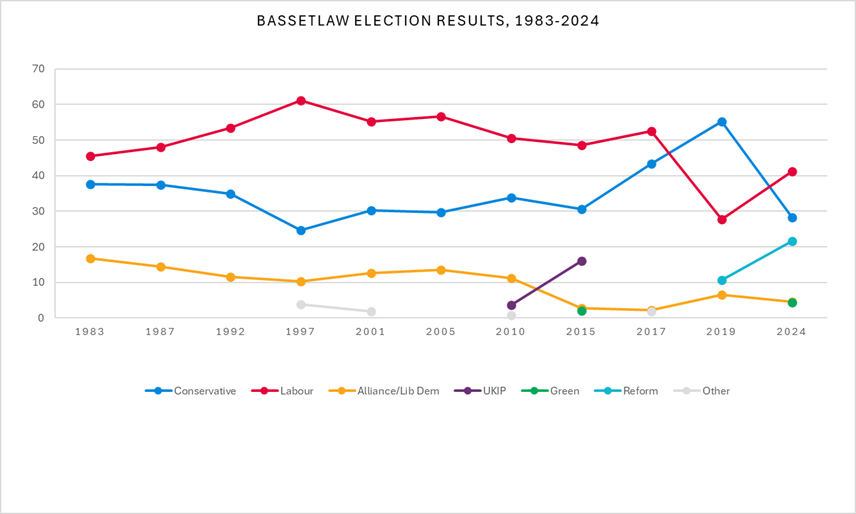
Bassetlaw election results 1983-2024

=== Elections in the 2020s ===
General election 2024: Bassetlaw
Party	Candidate	Votes	%	±%
Labour	Jo White	18,476	41.2	▲13.2
Conservative	Brendan Clarke-Smith	12,708	28.3	▼26.1
Reform	Frank Ward	9,751	21.7	▲10.8
Liberal Democrats	Helen Tamblyn-Saville	1,996	4.5	▼2.3
Green	Rachel Reeves	1,947	4.3	new
Majority		5,768	12.9	
Turnout		44,878	57.4	▼6.2
Registered electors		78,173		
Labour gain from Conservative		Swing	▲19.6	

=== Elections in the 2010s ===
2019 notional result
Party	Vote	%
Conservative	25,941	54.4
Labour	13,353	28.0
Brexit Party	5,173	10.9
Liberal Democrats	3,210	6.7
Majority	12,588	26.4
Turnout	47,677	62.9
Electorate	75,773	

General election 2019: Bassetlaw
Party	Candidate	Votes	%	±%
Conservative	Brendan Clarke-Smith	28,078	55.2	+11.9
Labour	Keir Morrison	14,065	27.7	–24.9
Brexit Party	Debbie Soloman	5,366	10.6	New
Liberal Democrats	Helen Tamblyn-Saville	3,332	6.6	+4.4
Majority		14,013	27.5	N/A
Turnout		50,841	63.5	–3.0
Conservative gain from Labour		Swing	+18.4	

General election 2017: Bassetlaw
Party	Candidate	Votes	%	±%
Labour	John Mann	27,467	52.6	+4.0
Conservative	Annette Simpson	22,615	43.3	+12.6
Liberal Democrats	Leon Duveen	1,154	2.2	−0.5
Independent	Nigel Turner	1,014	1.9	New
Majority		4,852	9.3	−8.6
Turnout		52,250	66.5	+2.9
Labour hold		Swing	−4.3	

General election 2015: Bassetlaw
Party	Candidate	Votes	%	±%
Labour	John Mann	23,965	48.6	−1.9
Conservative	Sarah Downes	15,122	30.7	−3.2
UKIP	Dave Scott	7,865	16.0	+12.4
Liberal Democrats	Leon Duveen	1,331	2.7	−8.5
Green	Kristopher Wragg	1,006	2.0	New
Majority		8,843	17.9	+1.3
Turnout		49,289	63.6	−1.2
Labour hold		Swing	+0.7	

General election 2010: Bassetlaw
Party	Candidate	Votes	%	±%
Labour	John Mann	25,018	50.5	−2.5
Conservative	Keith Girling	16,803	33.9	−1.2
Liberal Democrats	David Dobbie	5,570	11.2	−2.4
UKIP	Andrea Hamilton	1,779	3.6	New
Independent	Graham Whitehurst	407	0.8	New
Majority		8,215	16.6	−10.3
Turnout		49,577	64.8	+6.7
Labour hold		Swing	−5.1	

=== Elections in the 2000s ===
General election 2005: Bassetlaw
Party	Candidate	Votes	%	±%
Labour	John Mann	22,847	56.6	+1.3
Conservative	Jonathan Sheppard	12,010	29.8	−0.4
Liberal Democrats	David Dobbie	5,485	13.6	+0.9
Majority		10,837	26.8	+1.7
Turnout		40,342	58.1	+1.3
Labour hold		Swing	+0.9	

General election 2001: Bassetlaw
Party	Candidate	Votes	%	±%
Labour	John Mann	21,506	55.3	−5.8
Conservative	Alison Holley	11,758	30.2	+5.5
Liberal Democrats	Neil Taylor	4,942	12.7	+2.4
Socialist Labour	Kevin Meloy	689	1.8	New
Majority		9,748	25.1	−11.3
Turnout		38,895	56.8	−13.6
Labour hold		Swing	−5.5	

=== Elections in the 1990s ===
General election 1997: Bassetlaw
Party	Candidate	Votes	%	±%
Labour	Joe Ashton	29,298	61.1	+7.7
Conservative	Martyn Cleasby	11,838	24.7	−10.3
Liberal Democrats	Mike Kerringan	4,950	10.3	−1.3
Referendum	Roy Graham	1,838	3.8	New
Majority		17,460	36.4	+18.0
Turnout		47,924	70.4	−9.0
Labour hold		Swing	+9.0	

General election 1992: Bassetlaw
Party	Candidate	Votes	%	±%
Labour	Joe Ashton	29,061	53.4	+5.3
Conservative	Caroline Spelman	19,064	35.0	−2.5
Liberal Democrats	Mike J. Reynolds	6,340	11.6	−2.8
Majority		9,997	18.4	+7.8
Turnout		54,465	79.4	+1.8
Labour hold		Swing	+3.9	

=== Elections in the 1980s ===
General election 1987: Bassetlaw
Party	Candidate	Votes	%	±%
Labour	Joe Ashton	25,385	48.1	+2.5
Conservative	David Selves	19,772	37.5	−0.3
Alliance	William Smith	7,616	14.4	−2.2
Majority		5,613	10.6	+2.8
Turnout		52,773	77.6	+3.4
Labour hold		Swing	+1.4	

General election 1983: Bassetlaw
Party	Candidate	Votes	%	±%
Labour	Joe Ashton	22,231	45.6	−4.6
Conservative	Martyn Cleasby	18,400	37.7	−0.3
Alliance	Brian Withnall	8,124	16.7	+4.9
Majority		3,831	7.9	−4.4
Turnout		48,755	74.2	−5.2
Labour hold		Swing	-2.2	

=== Elections in the 1970s ===
General election 1979: Bassetlaw
Party	Candidate	Votes	%	±%
Labour	Joe Ashton	29,426	50.23	−3.46
Conservative	DK Harris	22,247	37.97	+7.07
Liberal	A Wilkinson	6,913	11.80	+2.85
Majority		7,179	12.26	+10.53
Turnout		58,586	79.42	
Labour hold		Swing	+5.27	

General election October 1974: Bassetlaw
Party	Candidate	Votes	%	±%
Labour	Joe Ashton	28,663	53.69	−6.3
Conservative	DK Harris	16,494	30.90	−9.11
Liberal	A Wilkinson	7,821	14.65	N/A
The Christian Party	A Storkey	408	0.76	New
Majority		12,169	22.79	+2.81
Turnout		53,386	74.43	
Labour hold		Swing	+1.41	

General election February 1974: Bassetlaw
Party	Candidate	Votes	%	±%
Labour	Joe Ashton	33,724	59.99	+5.12
Conservative	RC Heading	22,490	40.01	+0.80
Majority		11,234	19.98	+4.32
Turnout		56,214	79.05	
Labour hold		Swing	2.16	

General election 1970: Bassetlaw
Party	Candidate	Votes	%	±%
Labour	Joe Ashton	28,959	54.87	+5.23
Conservative	Jim Lester	20,698	39.21	−8.71
Liberal	Malcolm Anthony Haydon-Baillie	3,125	5.92	New
Majority		8,261	15.66	+13.94
Turnout		52,782	76.44	
Labour hold		Swing	+6.97	

=== Elections in the 1960s ===
1968 Bassetlaw by-election
Party	Candidate	Votes	%	±%
Labour	Joe Ashton	21,394	49.64	−11.99
Conservative	Jim Lester	20,654	47.92	+9.55
Independent	Thomas Lynch	1,053	2.44	New
Majority		740	1.72	−21.56
Turnout		43,101		
Labour hold		Swing	−10.77	

General election 1966: Bassetlaw
Party	Candidate	Votes	%	±%
Labour	Frederick Bellenger	27,623	61.63	+2.60
Conservative	Robert William Martin Orme	17,195	38.37	−2.60
Majority		10,428	23.26	+5.20
Turnout		44,818	73.29	
Labour hold		Swing	+2.6	

General election 1964: Bassetlaw
Party	Candidate	Votes	%	±%
Labour	Frederick Bellenger	27,612	59.03	+1.00
Conservative	Robert William Martin Orme	19,167	40.97	−1.00
Majority		8,445	18.06	+2.00
Turnout		46,779	77.00	−3.19
Labour hold		Swing	+1.0	

=== Elections in the 1950s ===
General election 1959: Bassetlaw
Party	Candidate	Votes	%	±%
Labour	Frederick Bellenger	27,875	58.03	−0.08
Conservative	Maurice Cowling	20,162	41.97	+0.08
Majority		7,713	16.06	−0.16
Turnout		48,037	80.19	
Labour hold		Swing	-0.08	

General election 1955: Bassetlaw
Party	Candidate	Votes	%	±%
Labour	Frederick Bellenger	26,873	58.11	−2.60
Conservative	Kathleen Voilet Maiden	19,375	41.89	+2.60
Majority		7,498	16.22	−5.20
Turnout		46,248	79.46	
Labour hold		Swing	-2.6	

General election 1951: Bassetlaw
Party	Candidate	Votes	%	±%
Labour	Frederick Bellenger	32,850	60.71	+3.07
Conservative	William Sime	21,257	39.29	+7.13
Majority		11,593	21.42	−4.06
Turnout		54,107	84.36	
Labour hold		Swing	-2.03	

General election 1950: Bassetlaw
Party	Candidate	Votes	%	±%
Labour	Frederick Bellenger	31,589	57.64	−5.15
Conservative	John James Cawdell Irving	17,622	32.16	−5.05
Liberal	William George Ernest Dyer	5,590	10.20	new
Majority		13,967	25.48	−0.1
Turnout		54,801	87.15	
Labour hold		Swing	-0.05	

=== Election in the 1940s ===
General election 1945: Bassetlaw
Party	Candidate	Votes	%	±%
Labour	Frederick Bellenger	30,382	62.79	+11.46
Conservative	Robert Laycock	18,005	37.21	N/A
Majority		12,377	25.58	N/A
Turnout		48,387	76.75	
Labour hold		Swing		

=== Election in the 1930s ===
General election 1935: Bassetlaw
Party	Candidate	Votes	%	±%
Labour	Frederick Bellenger	21,903	51.33	+17.97
National Labour	Malcolm MacDonald	20,764	48.67	−17.97
Majority		1,139	2.66	N/A
Turnout		42,667	79.87	
Labour gain from National Labour		Swing	+17.97	

General election 1931: Bassetlaw
Party	Candidate	Votes	%	±%
National Labour	Malcolm MacDonald	27,136	66.64	N/A
Labour	Harold Mostyn Watkins	13,582	33.36	−25.34
Majority		13,554	33.28	N/A
Turnout		40,718	79.55	
National Labour gain from Labour		Swing		

=== Elections in the 1920s ===
General election 1929: Bassetlaw
Party	Candidate	Votes	%	±%
Labour	Malcolm MacDonald	23,681	58.7	+17.7
Unionist	Ellis Hume-Williams	16,670	41.3	−5.0
Majority		7,011	17.4	N/A
Turnout		40,351	82.0	+0.8
Labour gain from Unionist		Swing	+11.3	

General election 1924: Bassetlaw
Party	Candidate	Votes	%	±%
Unionist	Ellis Hume-Williams	12,732	46.3	+4.0
Labour	Malcolm MacDonald	11,283	41.0	+12.7
Liberal	Arthur Neal	3,505	12.7	−16.7
Majority		1,449	5.3	−7.6
Turnout		27,520	81.8	+5.2
Unionist hold		Swing	−4.3	

Neal

General election 1923: Bassetlaw
Party	Candidate	Votes	%	±%
Unionist	Ellis Hume-Williams	10,419	42.3	−12.9
Liberal	Arthur Neal	7,247	29.4	New
Labour	Malcolm MacDonald	6,973	28.3	−16.5
Majority		3,172	12.9	+2.5
Turnout		24,639	76.6	+2.2
Unionist hold		Swing	N/A	

General election 1922: Bassetlaw
Party	Candidate	Votes	%	±%
Unionist	Ellis Hume-Williams	12,944	55.2	N/A
Labour	Henry Joseph Odell	10,502	44.8	New
Majority		2,442	10.4	N/A
Turnout		23,446	74.4	N/A
Unionist hold		Swing	N/A	

=== Elections in the 1910s ===
General election 1918: Bassetlaw
Party		Candidate	Votes	%	±%
C	Unionist	Ellis Hume-Williams	Unopposed		
	Unionist hold				
C indicates candidate endorsed by the coalition government.

General Election 1914–15:

Another General Election was required to take place before the end of 1915. The political parties had been making preparations for an election to take place and by July 1914, the following candidates had been selected;

- Unionist: Ellis Hume-Williams
- Liberal:

General election December 1910: Bassetlaw
Party	Candidate	Votes	%	±%
Conservative	Ellis Hume-Williams	5,436	51.0	−0.6
Liberal	Stopford Brooke	5,221	49.0	+0.6
Majority		215	2.0	−1.2
Turnout		10,657	88.7	−2.2
Conservative hold		Swing	−0.6	

General election January 1910: Bassetlaw
Party	Candidate	Votes	%	±%
Conservative	Ellis Hume-Williams	5,631	51.6	+4.2
Liberal	Frank Newnes	5,290	48.4	−4.2
Majority		341	3.2	N/A
Turnout		10,921	90.9	+0.8
Conservative gain from Liberal		Swing	+4.2	

=== Elections in the 1900s ===
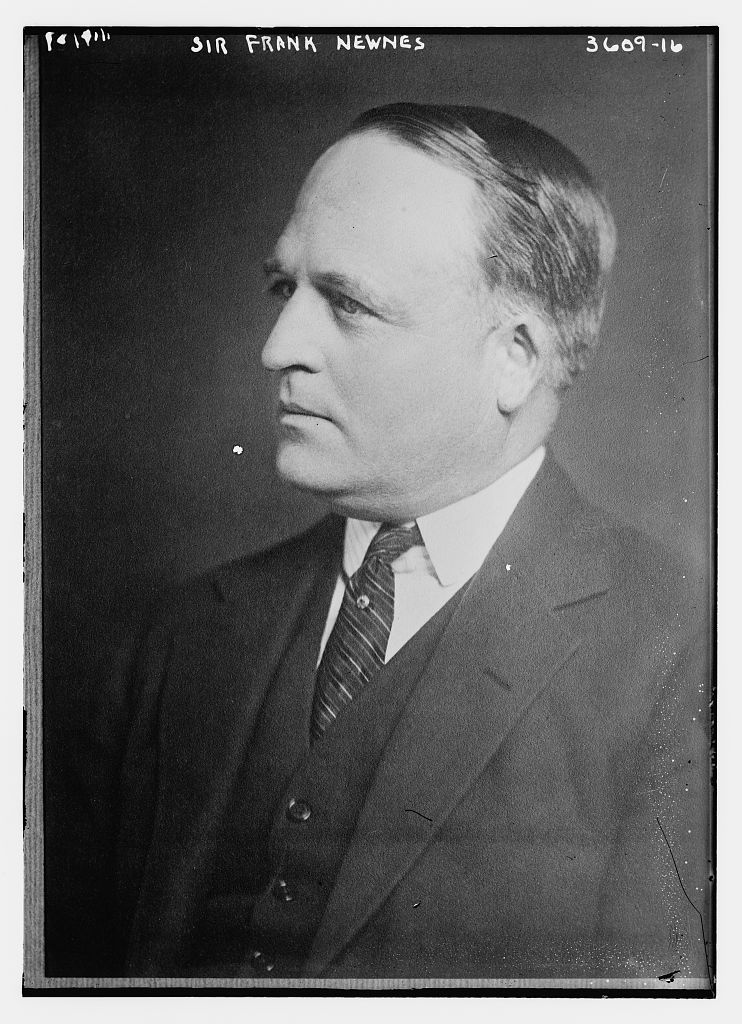
Newnes

General election 1906: Bassetlaw
Party	Candidate	Votes	%	±%
Liberal	Frank Newnes	5,365	52.6	New
Conservative	Frederick Milner	4,834	47.4	N/A
Majority		531	5.2	N/A
Turnout		10,199	90.1	N/A
Registered electors		11,320		
Liberal gain from Conservative		Swing	N/A	

General election 1900: Bassetlaw
Party	Candidate	Votes	%	±%
Conservative	Frederick Milner	Unopposed		
Conservative hold				

=== Elections in the 1890s ===
General election 1895: Bassetlaw
Party	Candidate	Votes	%	±%
Conservative	Frederick Milner	4,874	57.4	+5.0
Liberal	Robert Eadon Leader	3,621	42.6	−5.0
Majority		1,253	14.8	+10.0
Turnout		8,495	85.0	−3.4
Registered electors		9,990		
Conservative hold		Swing	+5.0	

Yoxall

General election 1892: Bassetlaw
Party	Candidate	Votes	%	±%
Conservative	Frederick Milner	4,446	52.4	N/A
Liberal	James Yoxall	4,044	47.6	N/A
Majority		402	4.8	N/A
Turnout		8,490	88.4	N/A
Registered electors		9,606		
Conservative hold		Swing	N/A	

Mellor

1890 Bassetlaw by-election
Party	Candidate	Votes	%	±%
Conservative	Frederick Milner	4,381	54.5	N/A
Liberal	John William Mellor	3,653	45.5	New
Majority		728	9.0	N/A
Turnout		8,034	78.2	N/A
Registered electors		10,268		
Conservative hold		Swing	N/A	

=== Elections in the 1880s ===
General election 1886: Bassetlaw
Party	Candidate	Votes	%	±%
Conservative	William Beckett-Denison	Unopposed		
Conservative hold				

General election 1885: Bassetlaw
Party	Candidate	Votes	%	±%
Conservative	William Beckett-Denison	4,367	51.7	
Liberal	Francis Foljambe	4,072	48.3	
Majority		295	3.4	
Turnout		8,439	89.0	
Registered electors		9,479		
Conservative win (new seat)				

== See also ==
- List of parliamentary constituencies in Nottinghamshire

== Sources ==
- UK General Election 1945 results
- UK General Election 1950 results
- UK General Election 1951 results
- UK General Election 1955 results
- UK General Election 1959 results
- UK General Election 1964 results
- UK General Election 1966 results
- UK General Election 1970 results
- UK General Election February 1974 results
- UK General Election October 1974 results
- UK General Election 1979 results
- UK General Election 1983 results
- UK General Election 1987 results
- UK General Election 1992 results
- UK General Election 1997 results
- UK General Election 2001 results
- UK General Election 2005 results
- UK General Election 2010 results (BBC)
