= 2011 Bassetlaw District Council election =

2011 UK local government election

← 2010	5 May 2011	2012 →

One third of seats to Bassetlaw District Council (16 seats) 25 seats needed for a majority
	First party	Second party	Third party
	Lab	Con	Ind
Party	Labour	Conservative	Independent
Seats won	11	4	1
Seats after	27	18	3
Seat change	▲7	▼7	Steady
- No election Colours denote the winning party, as shown in the main table of results.
Council control before election
Conservative
Council control after election
Labour

The 2011 Bassetlaw District Council election took place on 5 May 2011 to elect members of Bassetlaw District Council in Nottinghamshire, England as part of the 2011 United Kingdom local elections. One third of the council was up for election. A UK-wide referendum on whether to adopt the Alternative Vote electoral system was also held on this date. After the election, the composition of the council was:

- Labour 27
- Conservative 18
- Independents 3

== Election result ==
Bassetlaw Council Election Result 2011
Party	Seats	Seats %	Votes	Votes %
Labour	11	68.72%	16,425	62.72%
Conservative	4	25.00%	8,907	34.01%
Independents	1	6.25%	554	2.12%
Liberal Democrats	0	0.00%	303	1.16%

== Ward results ==
=== Blyth ===
Blyth
Party	Candidate	Votes	%
Conservative	Barry Albert Bowles	363	45.38
Labour	Grace Pengelly	288	36.00
Liberal Democrats	Peter John Thompson	149	18.63
Turnout		800	44.41

=== Carlton ===
Carlton
Party	Candidate	Votes	%
Labour	Tina Rafferty	1,333	60.51
Conservative	David Alan Hare	870	39.49
Turnout		2,203	47.94

=== East Markham ===
East Markham
Party	Candidate	Votes	%
Conservative	John Ogle	745	75.40
Labour	James Trebor Arthur Napier	243	24.60
Turnout		988	54.23

=== East Retford East ===
East Retford East
Party	Candidate	Votes	%
Labour	Carol Palmer	1,264	51.57
Conservative	James Walter Holland	1,187	48.43
Turnout		2,451	46.15

=== East Retford North ===
East Retford North
Party	Candidate	Votes	%
Labour	Adele Mumby	1,374	59.90
Conservative	Mike Pugsley	920	40.10
Turnout		2,294	47.47

=== Harworth ===
Harworth
Party	Candidate	Votes	%
Labour	June Evans	1,668	82.66
Conservative	Dianne Hare	350	17.34
Turnout		2,018	34.95

=== Rampton ===
Rampton
Party	Candidate	Votes	%
Conservative	Jeff Rickells	573	70.39
Labour	Pam Skelding	241	29.61
Turnout		814	50.77

=== Ranskill ===
Ranskill
Party	Candidate	Votes	%
Conservative	Michael Tom Gray	441	51.10
Labour	Aidan Mann	369	42.76
Liberal Democrats	Mark Peter Hunter	53	6.14
Turnout		863	47.02

=== Sturton ===
Sturton
Party	Candidate	Votes	%
Independent	Hugh Burton (Elected uncontested)	0	0.00
Turnout		0	0.00

=== Welbeck ===
Welbeck
Party	Candidate	Votes	%
Labour	Pat Douglas	457	57.56
Conservative	Mary Stokes	337	42.44
Turnout		794	51.28

=== Worksop East ===
Worksop East
Party	Candidate	Votes	%
Labour	Cliff Entwistle	1,436	72.16
Independent	Geoff Coe	554	27.84
Turnout		1,990	40.61

=== Worksop North ===
Worksop North
Party	Candidate	Votes	%
Labour	Bill Barker	1,733	71.35
Conservative	Hannah Wright	696	28.65
Turnout		2,429	37.07

=== Worksop North East ===
Worksop North East
Party	Candidate	Votes	%
Labour	Simon Greaves	1,630	73.16
Conservative	Raymond Simpson	598	26.84
Turnout		2,228	44.34

=== Worksop North West ===
Worksop North West
Party	Candidate	Votes	%
Labour	Alan Rhodes	1,491	72.80
Conservative	Tracey Lee Taylor	557	27.20
Turnout		2,048	36.18

=== Worksop South ===
Worksop South
Party	Candidate	Votes	%
Labour	Julie Leigh	1,274	53.80
Conservative	Alec Thorpe	993	41.93
Liberal Democrats	Leon Maurice Duveen	101	4.27
Turnout		2,368	43.70

=== Worksop South East ===
Worksop South East
Party	Candidate	Votes	%
Labour	Josie Potts	1,624	85.43
Conservative	Catherine Margaret Parrish	277	14.57
Turnout		1,901	33.58

== Referendum ==
United Kingdom Alternative Vote referendum result (Bassetlaw)
Choice	Votes	%
Yes	8,757	24.88%
No	26,441	75.12%

- Electorate: 84,371
- Valid votes cast: 35,198
- Turnout: 41.98%
- Spoilt ballots: 221
