= 2012 Bassetlaw District Council election =

2012 UK local government election

← 2011	3 May 2012	2014 →

One third of seats to Bassetlaw District Council (16 seats) 25 seats needed for a majority
	First party	Second party	Third party
	Lab	Con	Ind
Party	Labour	Conservative	Independent
Seats won	11	4	1
Seats after	34	11	3
Seat change	▲7	▼7	Steady
- No election Colours denote the winning party, as shown in the main table of results.
Council control before election
Labour
Council control after election
Labour

The 2012 Bassetlaw District Council election took place on 3 May 2012 to elect members of Bassetlaw District Council in Nottinghamshire, England as part of the 2012 United Kingdom local elections. One third of the council was up for election. After the election, the composition of the council was:

- Labour 34
- Conservative 11
- Independents 3

== Election result ==
Bassetlaw election result 2012
Party	Seats	Gains	Losses	Net gain/loss	Seats %	Votes %	Votes	+/−
Labour	34							
Conservative	11							
Independent	3							
Liberal Democrats	0							

=== Ward results ===
==== Beckingham ====
Beckingham
Party	Candidate	Votes	%
Independent	Joan Sanger	258	38.6
Independent	Raymond Arthur	163	24.4
Conservative	Simon Taylor	153	22.9
Labour	Phillip Goodliffe	95	14.2
Turnout			36.36
Independent gain from Conservative			

==== Carlton ====
Carlton
Party	Candidate	Votes	%
Conservative	Val Bowles	1,001	62.3
Labour	David Pidwell	607	37.7
Turnout			36.63
Conservative hold			

==== Clayworth ====
Clayworth
Party	Candidate	Votes	%
Conservative	Kath Sutton	408	69.3
Labour	Gavin Briers	181	30.7
Turnout			38.58
Conservative hold			

==== East Retford East ====
East Retford East
Party	Candidate	Votes	%
Labour	Michael Storey	1,033	51.9
Conservative	Mike Quigley	842	42.3
Liberal Democrats	Mark Hunter	115	5.8
Turnout			37.25
Labour gain from Conservative			

==== East Retford North ====
East Retford North
Party	Candidate	Votes	%
Labour	Michelle Gregory	1,144	55.7
Conservative	Anthony Tromans	610	44.3
Turnout			36.41
Labour hold			

==== East Retford South ====
East Retford South
Party	Candidate	Votes	%
Labour	Ann Batty	831	71.5
Conservative	Bryn Jones	331	28.5
Turnout			34.90
Labour hold			

==== East Retford West ====
East Retford West
Party	Candidate	Votes	%
Labour	Alan Chambers	707	66.7
Conservative	Graham Ince	353	33.3
Turnout			31.13
Labour gain from Conservative			

==== Harworth ====
Harworth
Party	Candidate	Votes	%
Labour	David Challinor	1,402	88.1
Conservative	Dianne Hare	190	11.9
Turnout			28.01
Labour hold			

==== Sutton ====
Sutton
Party	Candidate	Votes	%
Conservative	Tracey Taylor	340	67.6
Labour	Tony Brown	163	32.4
Turnout			30.93
Conservative hold			

==== Tuxford and Trent ====
Tuxford and Trent
Party	Candidate	Votes	%
Conservative	Shirley Isard	543	52.0
Labour	Andy Jee	502	48.0
Turnout			31.55
Conservative hold			

==== Worksop East ====
Worksop East
Party	Candidate	Votes	%
Labour	Jo White	1,135	75.1
Independent	Geoff Coe	376	24.9
Turnout			31.07
Labour hold			

==== Worksop North ====
Worksop North
Party	Candidate	Votes	%
Labour	Gwynneth Jones	1,323	76.8
Conservative	David Alan Hare	400	23.2
Turnout			25.88
Labour gain from Conservative			

==== Worksop North-East ====
Worksop North-East
Party	Candidate	Votes	%
Labour	Rebecca Leigh	1,265	77
Conservative	Emma Auckland	378	33
Turnout			32.88
Labour gain from Conservative			

==== Worksop North-West ====
Worksop North-West
Party	Candidate	Votes	%
Labour	Sybil Fielding	1,209	78.9
Conservative	James Halpin	323	21.1
Turnout			26.75
Labour gain from Conservative			

==== Worksop South ====
Worksop South
Party	Candidate	Votes	%
Labour	Sylvia May	985	54.9
Conservative	Alec Thorpe	635	35.4
Liberal Democrats	Leon Duveen	174	9.7
Turnout			33.05
Labour gain from Conservative			

==== Worksop South East ====
Worksop South East
Party	Candidate	Votes	%
Labour	John Shephard	1,232	87.3
Conservative	Catherine Parrish	179	12.7
Turnout			24.91
Labour hold			
