= 2006 Bassetlaw District Council election =

2006 UK local government election

- 4 May 2006

One third of seats to Bassetlaw District Council (16 seats) 25 seats needed for a majority
- Turnout: 30.6%
	First party	Second party	Third party
	Con	Lab	Ind
Party	Conservative	Labour	Independent
Seats won	9	7	0
Seats after	28	14	5
Seat change	▲4	▼4	Steady
- No election Colours denote the winning party, as shown in the main table of results.
Council control before election
No overall control
Council control after election
Conservative

The 2006 Bassetlaw District Council election took place on 4 May 2006 to elect members of Bassetlaw District Council in Nottinghamshire, England. One third of the council was up for election.

== Election result ==
The Conservative Party won nine seats, taking their overall number of seats to 28, and gained control of the council for the first time since the Bassetlaw district was created in 1974.

Overall result
Party	Seats (2006)	Seats (Council)	Seats (Change)
Conservative	9	28	+4
Labour	7	14	-4
Liberal Democrats	0	1	-
Independent	0	5	-
Registered electors	69,032		
Votes cast	21,134		
Turnout	30.6%		

== Ward results ==
=== Carlton ===
Carlton
Party	Candidate	Votes	%	±%
Conservative	Helen Colton	787	50.6%	
Labour	Gary Moore	767	49.4%	
Turnout		1,575	33.9%	
Registered electors		4,642		

=== East Retford East ===
East Retford East
Party	Candidate	Votes	%	±%
Conservative	Wendy Quigley	1,467	72.7%	
Labour	Vivien Thomas	551	27.3%	
Turnout		2,038	37.3%	
Registered electors		5,470		

=== East Retford North ===
East Retford North
Party	Candidate	Votes	%	±%
Labour	Graham Oxby	889	50.5%	
Conservative	Michael Gray	873	49.5%	
Turnout		1,771	36.9%	
Registered electors		4,798		

=== East Retford South ===
East Retford South
Party	Candidate	Votes	%	±%
Labour	Carolyn Troop	618	56.9%	
Conservative	Stephen Thornhill	468	43.1%	
Turnout		1,091	33.2%	
Registered electors		3,287		

=== East Retford West ===
East Retford West
Party	Candidate	Votes	%	±%
Conservative	Margaret Skelton	602	65.5%	
Labour	James Napier	317	34.5%	
Turnout		926	28.8%	
Registered electors		3,214		

=== Everton ===
Everton
Party	Candidate	Votes	%	±%
Conservative	Annette Simpson	484	59.4%	
BNP	David Otter	177	21.7%	
Labour	Philip Goodliffe	154	18.9%	
Turnout		815	46.7%	
Registered electors		1,773		

=== Harworth ===
Harworth
Party	Candidate	Votes	%	±%
Labour	Frank Hart	798	56.2%	
Independent	Denise Challinor	623	43.8%	
Turnout		1,421	25.2%	
Registered electors		5,673		

=== Langold ===
Langold
Party	Candidate	Votes	%	±%
Labour	Gillian Freeman	344	69.2%	
Conservative	Tracey Taylor	153	30.8%	
Turnout		497	26.4%	
Registered electors		1,905		

=== Misterton ===
Misterton
Party	Candidate	Votes	%	±%
Conservative	Raymond Simpson	321	50.7%	
Labour	Jose Barry	312	49.3%	
Turnout		633	33.1%	
Registered electors		1,915		

=== Tuxford and Trent ===
Tuxford and Trent
Party	Candidate	Votes	%	±%
Conservative	Keith Isard	803	73.1%	
Labour	Pamela Skelding	295	26.9%	
Turnout		1,098	33.8%	
Registered electors		3,301		

=== Worksop East ===
Worksop East
Party	Candidate	Votes	%	±%
Labour	Griffith Wynne	812	52.2%	
Independent	William Rodgers	744	47.8%	
Turnout		1,556	30.4%	
Registered electors		5,127		

=== Worksop North ===
Worksop North
Party	Candidate	Votes	%	±%
Conservative	Steven Burton	881	53.6%	
Labour	Vaughan Thomas	763	46.4%	
Turnout		1,644	26.0%	
Registered electors		6,357		

=== Worksop North East ===
Worksop North East
Party	Candidate	Votes	%	±%
Conservative	Joseph Hayward	832	50.8%	
Labour	Simon Greaves	807	49.2%	
Turnout		1,639	32.3%	
Registered electors		5,113		

=== Worksop North West ===
Worksop North West
Party	Candidate	Votes	%	±%
Labour	David Pressley	797	55.9%	
Conservative	Vicky Wanless	629	44.1%	
Turnout		1,426	26.4%	
Registered electors		5,499		

=== Worksop South ===
Worksop South
Party	Candidate	Votes	%	±%
Conservative	Christopher Wanless	1,114	60.5%	
Labour	Rory Palmer	728	39.5%	
Turnout		1,842	34.6%	
Registered electors		5,457		

=== Worksop South East ===
Worksop South East
Party	Candidate	Votes	%	±%
Labour	Brian Hopkinson	809	69.6%	
Conservative	Maria Critchley	353	30.4%	
Turnout		1,162	21.3%	
Registered electors		5,501		
