= 2014 Bassetlaw District Council election =

2014 UK local government election

| ← 2012 | 22 May 2014 | 2015 → |

One third of seats to Bassetlaw District Council (16 seats) 25 seats needed for a majority
| | First party | Second party | Third party |
|---|---|---|---|
| | Lab | Con | Ind |
| Party | Labour | Conservative | Independent |
| Seats won | 12 | 3 | 1 |
| Seats after | 35 | 10 | 3 |
| Seat change | ▲1 | ▼1 | Steady |
- No election Colours denote the winning party, as shown in the main table of results.
Council control before election
Labour
Council control after election
Labour

The 2014 Bassetlaw District Council election took place on 22 May 2014 to elect members of Bassetlaw District Council in England. This was on the same day as other local elections. One third of the council was up for election.

== Results ==
Bassetlaw District Council election, 2014
| Party | Seats | Gains | Losses | Net gain/loss | Seats % | Votes % | Votes | +/− |
|---|---|---|---|---|---|---|---|---|
| Labour | 12 | | | | 75.0% | 49.8% | 11266 | |
| Conservative | 3 | | | | 18.7% | 19.5% | 4418 | |
| Other parties | 1 | | | | 6.3% | 2.9% | 652 | |
| UKIP | 0 | | | | 0.0% | 26.3% | 5945 | |
| Liberal Democrats | 0 | | | | 0.0% | 1.5% | 345 | |

=== Carlton ===
Carlton (1)
| Party | Candidate | Votes | % | ±% |
|---|---|---|---|---|
| Labour | Robin Carrington-Wilde | 784 | 48.7% | |
| UKIP | Roger Martin Vernon | 441 | 27.3% | |
| Conservative | Wayne Roy Clarke | 386 | 24% | |
| Turnout | | | | |

=== East Retford East ===
East Retford East (1)
| Party | Candidate | Votes | % | ±% |
|---|---|---|---|---|
| Conservative | Mike Quigley | 727 | 38.2% | |
| Labour | Andy Jee | 702 | 36.9% | |
| UKIP | Kristian Denman | 386 | 20.3% | |
| Liberal Democrats | Leon Duveen | 86 | 4.5% | |
| Turnout | | | | |

=== East Retford North ===
East Retford North (1)
| Party | Candidate | Votes | % | ±% |
|---|---|---|---|---|
| Labour | Graham Oxby | 1,013 | 54.6% | |
| Conservative | Steve Vickers | 410 | 22.1% | |
| UKIP | Gyll Smith | 388 | 20.9% | |
| Liberal Democrats | Mark Hunter | 45 | 2.4% | |
| Turnout | | | | |

=== East Retford South ===
East Retford South (1)
| Party | Candidate | Votes | % | ±% |
|---|---|---|---|---|
| Labour | Carolyn Troop | 642 | 54.6% | |
| UKIP | Chris Walters | 314 | 26.7% | |
| Conservative | Bryn Jones | 220 | 18.7% | |
| Turnout | | | | |

=== East Retford West ===
East Retford West (1)
| Party | Candidate | Votes | % | ±% |
|---|---|---|---|---|
| Labour | Ian Campbell | 544 | 48.5% | |
| UKIP | Jon Wade | 292 | 26.1% | |
| Conservative | Jamie Ditch | 232 | 20.7% | |
| Liberal Democrats | Jennifier Coggles | 53 | 4.7% | |
| Turnout | | | | |

=== Everton ===
Everton (1)
| Party | Candidate | Votes | % | ±% |
|---|---|---|---|---|
| Conservative | Anette Simpson | 360 | 50.7% | |
| UKIP | Diana Capp | 166 | 23.4% | |
| Labour | Sarah Farncombe | 145 | 20.4% | |
| Liberal Democrats | Darren Burr | 39 | 5.5% | |
| Turnout | | | | |

=== Harworth ===
Harworth (1)
| Party | Candidate | Votes | % | ±% |
|---|---|---|---|---|
| Labour | Anita Smith | 1,064 | 76.6% | |
| UKIP | Peter Hewkin | 169 | 12.2% | |
| Conservative | Rob Robson | 156 | 11.2% | |
| Turnout | | | | |

=== Langold ===
Langold (1)
| Party | Candidate | Votes | % | ±% |
|---|---|---|---|---|
| Labour | Jill Freeman | 391 | 64.6% | |
| UKIP | David Jackson | 186 | 30.7% | |
| Conservative | Dianne Hare | 28 | 4.6% | |
| Turnout | | | | |
| Labour hold | | Swing | | |

=== Misterton ===
Misterton (1)
| Party | Candidate | Votes | % | ±% |
|---|---|---|---|---|
| Independent | Hazel Brand | 491 | 66.4% | |
| UKIP | Roger Capp | 150 | 20.3% | |
| Conservative | Simon Taylor | 98 | 13.3% | |
| Turnout | | | | |

=== Tuxford and Trent ===
Tuxford and Trent (1)
| Party | Candidate | Votes | % | ±% |
|---|---|---|---|---|
| Conservative | Keith Isard | 562 | 41.7% | |
| Labour | Ross Moloney | 443 | 32.9% | |
| UKIP | Trevor Fisher | 343 | 25.4% | |
| Turnout | | | | |

=== Worksop East ===
Worksop East (1)
| Party | Candidate | Votes | % | ±% |
|---|---|---|---|---|
| Labour | Griff Wynne | 914 | 59.4% | |
| UKIP | Michael Lowe | 463 | 30.1% | |
| Independent | Geoff Coe | 161 | 10.5% | |
| Turnout | | | | |

=== Worksop North ===
Worksop North (1)
| Party | Candidate | Votes | % | ±% |
|---|---|---|---|---|
| Labour | David Potts | 980 | 51.4% | |
| UKIP | Deidre Vernon | 593 | 31.1% | |
| Conservative | Perry Offer | 333 | 17.5% | |
| Turnout | | | | |

=== Worksop North East ===
Worksop North East (1)
| Party | Candidate | Votes | % | ±% |
|---|---|---|---|---|
| Labour | Maddy Richardson | 868 | 53.5% | |
| UKIP | Tony Clayton | 467 | 28.8% | |
| Conservative | Emma Aukland | 288 | 17.7% | |
| Turnout | | | | |

=== Worksop North West ===
Worksop North West (1)
| Party | Candidate | Votes | % | ±% |
|---|---|---|---|---|
| Labour | David Pressley | 910 | 56.7% | |
| UKIP | Ivor Jones | 696 | 43.3% | |
| Turnout | | | | |

=== Worksop South ===
Worksop South (1)
| Party | Candidate | Votes | % | ±% |
|---|---|---|---|---|
| Labour | Kevin Greaves | 795 | 42.1% | |
| Conservative | Adam Gray | 524 | 27.7% | |
| UKIP | Dave Scott | 498 | 26.4% | |
| Liberal Democrats | Peter Thompson | 72 | 3.8% | |
| Turnout | | | | |

=== Worksop South East ===
Worksop South East (1)
| Party | Candidate | Votes | % | ±% |
|---|---|---|---|---|
| Labour | Deirdre Foley | 1,071 | 66.6% | |
| UKIP | Anthony Keeling | 393 | 24.4% | |
| Conservative | Nathan Gray | 94 | 5.9% | |
| Liberal Democrats | Carole Thompson | 50 | 3.1% | |
| Turnout | | | | |
