= 2008 Bassetlaw District Council election =

2008 UK local government election

← 2007	1 May 2008	2010 →

One third of seats to Bassetlaw District Council (16 seats) 25 seats needed for a majority
- Turnout: 30.8%
	First party	Second party	Third party
	Con	Lab	Ind
Party	Conservative	Labour	Independent
Seats won	12	3	1
Seats after	30	16	2
Seat change	▲3	Steady	▼3
- No election Colours denote the winning party, as shown in the main table of results.
Council control before election
Conservative
Council control after election
Conservative

The 2008 Bassetlaw District Council election took place on 1 May 2008 to elect members of Bassetlaw District Council in Nottinghamshire, England. One third of the council was up for election.

== Election result ==
Overall result
Party	Seats (2008)	Seats (Council)	Seats (Change)
Conservative	12	30	+3
Labour	3	16	-
Independent	1	2	-3
Registered electors	67,876		
Votes cast	20,936		
Turnout	30.8%		

== Ward results ==
=== Beckingham ===
Beckingham
Party	Candidate	Votes	%	±%
Conservative	Kenneth Bullivant	518	70.38	
Labour	Joan Sanger	218	29.62	
Turnout		736	35.2%	
Registered electors		1,801		

=== Carlton ===
Carlton
Party	Candidate	Votes	%	±%
Conservative	Val Bowles	980	60.1%	
Labour	Maurice Stocks	650	39.9%	
Turnout		1,630	51.8%	
Registered electors		4,660		

=== Clayworth ===
Clayworth
Party	Candidate	Votes	%	±%
Conservative	Kath Sutton	461	56.8%	
BNP	David Otter	243	30.0%	
Labour	Philip Goodliffe	107	13.2%	
Turnout		811	51.8%	
Registered electors		1,568		

=== East Retford East ===
East Retford East
Party	Candidate	Votes	%	±%
Conservative	Mike Quigley	1,148	57.7%	
Independent	Michael Jenkins	422	21.2%	
Labour	Robert Clyndes	420	21.1%	
Turnout		1,990	36.9%	
Registered electors		5,409		

=== East Retford North ===
East Retford North
Party	Candidate	Votes	%	±%
Conservative	Anthony Tromans	965	57.9%	
Labour	Pamela Skelding	703	42.2%	
Turnout		1,668	34.4%	
Registered electors		4,847		

=== East Retford South ===
East Retford South
Party	Candidate	Votes	%	±%
Conservative	Bryn Jones	526	53.4%	
Labour	Philip Skelding	459	46.6%	
Turnout		985	30.0%	
Registered electors		3,279		

=== East Retford West ===
East Retford West
Party	Candidate	Votes	%	±%
Conservative	Perry Offer	570	63.8%	
Labour	Rod Pickford	324	36.2%	
Turnout		894	25.8%	
Registered electors		3,483		

=== Harworth ===
Harworth
Party	Candidate	Votes	%	±%
Labour	David Challinor	1,009	64.0%	
Conservative	Tracey Taylor	568	36.0%	
Turnout		1,577	27.1%	
Registered electors		5,851		

=== Sutton ===
Sutton
Party	Candidate	Votes	%	±%
Conservative	Liz Yates	Unopposed		

=== Tuxford and Trent ===
Tuxford and Trent
Party	Candidate	Votes	%	±%
Conservative	Shirley Isard	756	71.6%	
Labour	Marilyn McCarthy	300	28.4%	
Turnout		1,056	31.5%	
Registered electors		3,390		

=== Worksop East ===
Worksop East
Party	Candidate	Votes	%	±%
Labour	John Scott	663	41.4%	
Independent	Geoff Coe	581	36.3%	
Independent	Geoff Hurst	357	22.3%	
Turnout		1,601	31.6%	
Registered electors		5,081		

=== Worksop North ===
Worksop North
Party	Candidate	Votes	%	±%
Conservative	Vicky Wanless	907	51.8%	
Labour	David Potts	843	48.2%	
Turnout		1,750	27.1%	
Registered electors		6,530		

=== Worksop North East ===
Worksop North East
Party	Candidate	Votes	%	±%
Conservative	Bill Graham	926	53.2%	
Labour	Shirley Toms	813	46.8%	
Turnout		1,739	34.3%	
Registered electors		5,097		

=== Worksop North West ===
Worksop North West
Party	Candidate	Votes	%	±%
Independent	Ivor Jones	961	61.4%	
Labour	Robin Carrington-Wilde	604	38.6%	
Turnout		1,565	28.7%	
Registered electors		5,635		

=== Worksop South ===
Worksop South
Party	Candidate	Votes	%	±%
Conservative	Michael Bennett	1,372	78.2%	
Labour	Eileen Hart	383	21.8%	
Turnout		1,755	32.0%	
Registered electors		5,518		

=== Worksop South East ===
Worksop South East
Party	Candidate	Votes	%	±%
Labour	John Shephard	858	72.8%	
Conservative	Philip Smith	321	27.2%	
Turnout		1,179	20.8%	
Registered electors		5,727		
