= 2010 Bassetlaw District Council election =

2010 UK local government election

← 2008	6 May 2010	2011 →

One third of seats to Bassetlaw District Council (16 seats) 25 seats needed for a majority
- Turnout: 61.4%
	First party	Second party	Third party
	Con	Lab	Ind
Party	Conservative	Labour	Independent
Seats won	4	11	1
Seats after	25	20	3
Seat change	▼5	▲4	▲1
- No election Colours denote the winning party, as shown in the main table of results.
Council control before election
Conservative
Council control after election
Conservative

The 2010 Bassetlaw District Council election took place on 6 May 2010 to elect members of Bassetlaw District Council in Nottinghamshire, England as part of the 2010 United Kingdom local elections. One third of the council was up for election.

== Election result ==
Overall Result
Party	Seats (2010)	Seats (Council)	Seats (Change)
Conservative	4	25	-5
Labour	11	20	+4
Independent	1	3	+1
Registered electors	68,779		
Votes cast	42,220		
Turnout	61.4%		

== Ward results ==
=== Carlton ===
Carlton
Party	Candidate	Votes	%	±%
Labour	Robin Carrington-Wilde	1,628	54.8%	
Conservative	Helen Stuttard Colton	1,342	45.2%	
Turnout		2,970	64.0%	
Registered electors		4,638		

=== East Retford East ===
East Retford East
Party	Candidate	Votes	%	±%
Conservative	Wendy Quigley	1,869	55.0%	
Labour	Jim Anderson	1,532	45.0%	
Turnout		3,401	64.3%	
Registered electors		5,289		

=== East Retford North ===
East Retford North
Party	Candidate	Votes	%	±%
Labour	Graham Oxby	1,619	53.1%	
Conservative	Emma Auckland	1,146	37.6%	
BNP	David Otter	282	9.3%	
Turnout		3,047	63.1%	
Registered electors		4,830		

=== East Retford South ===
East Retford South
Party	Candidate	Votes	%	±%
Labour	Carolyn Troop	1,287	63.8%	
Conservative	Ferzanna Riley	730	36.2%	
Turnout		2,017	62.9%	
Registered electors		3,206		

=== East Retford West ===
East Retford West
Party	Candidate	Votes	%	±%
Labour	Ian Campbell	782	37.9%	
Conservative	Chris Hollands	767	37.2%	
Liberal Democrats	David Hassett	515	25.0%	
Turnout		2,064	57.2%	
Registered electors		3,607		

=== Everton ===
Everton
Party	Candidate	Votes	%	±%
Conservative	Annette Simpson	732	56.4%	
Independent	Chris Stringer	566	43.6%	
Turnout		1,298	71.8%	
Registered electors		1,809		

=== Harworth ===
Harworth
Party	Candidate	Votes	%	±%
Labour	Frank Hart	2,345	72.5%	
Conservative	Steve Harwood-Gray	891	27.5%	
Turnout		3,236	56.9%	
Registered electors		5,691		

=== Langold ===
Langold
Party	Candidate	Votes	%	±%
Labour	Jill Freeman	857	78.0%	
Conservative	Pat Grant	242	22.0%	
Turnout		1,099	61.2%	
Registered electors		1,795		

=== Misterton ===
Misterton
Party	Candidate	Votes	%	±%
Independent	Hazel Brand	773	58.3%	
Conservative	Raymond Simpson	554	41.7%	
Turnout		1,327	67.8%	
Registered electors		1,958		

=== Tuxford and Trent ===
Tuxford and Trent
Party	Candidate	Votes	%	±%
Conservative	Keith Isard	1,264	57.4%	
Labour	Bert Hunt	937	42.6%	
Turnout		2,201	64.3%	
Registered electors		3,424		

=== Worksop East ===
Worksop East
Party	Candidate	Votes	%	±%
Labour	Griff Wynne	2,090	70.1%	
Independent	Geoff Coe	893	29.9%	
Turnout		2,983	60.2%	
Registered electors		4,952		

=== Worksop North ===
Worksop North
Party	Candidate	Votes	%	±%
Labour	David Potts	2,428	62.1%	
Conservative	Peter Ashford	1,480	37.9%	
Turnout		3,908	60.7%	
Registered electors		6,439		

=== Worksop North East ===
Worksop North East
Party	Candidate	Votes	%	±%
Labour	Shirley Toms	2,110	64.1%	
Conservative	Alec Thorpe	1,184	35.9%	
Turnout		3,294	66.2%	
Registered electors		4,975		

=== Worksop North West ===
Worksop North West
Party	Candidate	Votes	%	±%
Labour	David Pressley	2,146	66.6%	
Conservative	Vincent Audritt	1,077	33.4%	
Turnout		3,223	59.7%	
Registered electors		5,396		

=== Worksop South ===
Worksop South
Party	Candidate	Votes	%	±%
Conservative	Chris Wanless	1,823	53.3%	
Labour	Kevin Greaves	1,600	46.7%	
Turnout		3,423	62.4%	
Registered electors		5,359		

=== Worksop South East ===
Worksop South East
Party	Candidate	Votes	%	±%
Labour	Brian Hopkinson	2,024	74.2%	
Liberal Democrats	Mark Hunter	386	14.1%	
Conservative	Catherine Parrish	319	11.7%	
Turnout		2,729	50.4%	
Registered electors		5,411		
