= Sturton (Bassetlaw electoral ward) =

- Electoral ward
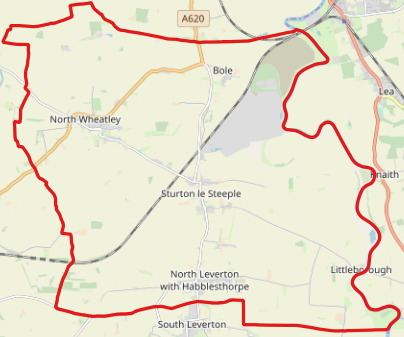
- Electorate: 1,850 (2019)
- District: Bassetlaw
- Region: East Midlands
- Country: England
- Sovereign state: United Kingdom
- Postcode district: DN22
- UK Parliament: Bassetlaw
- Councillors: 1

Sturton is an electoral ward in the district of Bassetlaw. The ward elects one councillor to Bassetlaw District Council using the first past the post electoral system for a four-year term in office. The number of registered voters in the ward is 1,850 as of 2019.

It consists of the villages of Bole, North Wheatley, North Leverton with Habblesthorpe, Sturton le Steeple and West Burton.

The ward was created in 2002 following a review of electoral boundaries in Bassetlaw by the Boundary Committee for England.

== Councillors ==
Interactive map of ward boundaries.

The ward elects one councillor every four years. Prior to 2015, Bassetlaw District Council was elected by thirds with elections taking place every year except the year in which elections to Nottinghamshire County Council took place.

Election	Councillor
2002	Hugh Burton (Independent)
2003	Hugh Burton (Independent)
2007	Hugh Burton (Independent)
2011	Hugh Burton (Independent)
2015	Hugh Burton (Independent)
2019	James Naish (Labour)
2023	James Naish (Labour)
2025 by-election	Matt Turner (Reform UK)

== Elections ==
=== 2025 by-election ===
Sturton (1) 1 May 2025
Party	Candidate	Votes	%	±%
Reform	Matt Turner	331	42.7%	
Conservative	James Purle	231	29.8%	
Labour	Maureen Roberts	139	17.9%	
Liberal Democrats	Simon Russell	68	8.7%	
Turnout		775	41.8%	
Reform gain from Labour		Swing		

=== 2023 ===
Sturton (1) 4 May 2023
Party	Candidate	Votes	%	±%
Labour	James Naish (inc)	524	77.6%	▲15.2%
Conservative	Kirsty Glasby	151	22.4%	▼15.2%
Turnout		680	36.5%	
Labour hold		Swing		

=== 2019 ===
Sturton (1) 2 May 2019
Party	Candidate	Votes	%	±%
Labour	James Naish	436	62.4%	▲40.8%
Conservative	Daniel Gregory	263	37.6%	N/A
Turnout		731	39.5%	
Labour gain from Independent		Swing		

=== 2015 ===
Sturton (1) 7 May 2015
Party	Candidate	Votes	%	±%
Independent	Hugh Burton	819	63.5%	
Labour	Patricia Woollett	279	21.6%	
Green	Doug Macdonald	191	14.8%	
Turnout			71.7%	
Independent hold		Swing		

=== 2011 ===
Sturton (1) 5 May 2011
Party	Candidate	Votes	%	±%
Independent	Hugh Burton (Elected uncontested)	N/A	N/A	
Turnout				

=== 2007 ===
Sturton (1) 3 May 2007
Party	Candidate	Votes	%	±%
Independent	Hugh Burton	640	83.5%	
Labour	Cadell Thomas	126	16.5%	
Turnout		766	43.4%	

=== 2003 ===
Sturton (1) 1 May 2003
Party	Candidate	Votes	%	±%
Independent	Hugh Burton	555	76.0%	
Conservative	Marion Smith	175	24.0%	
Turnout		730	44.4%	
