= St Martin's Church, Bole =

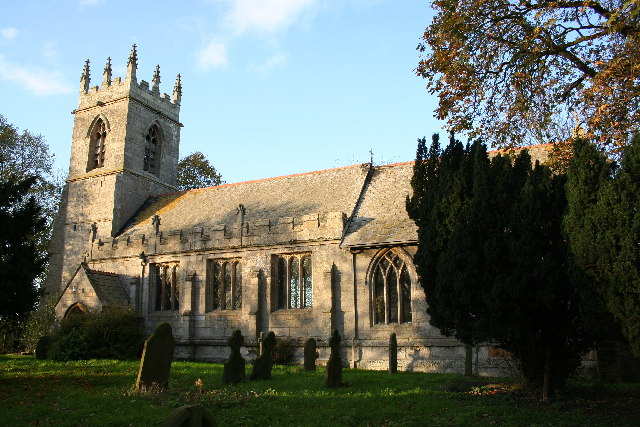
- St Martin's Church, Bole
- St Martin's Church, Bole
- 53°22′26.16″N 0°48′39.66″W
- OS grid reference: SK 79308 87102
- Location: Bole, Nottinghamshire
- Country: England
- Denomination: Church of England
- Website: www.achurchnearyou.com

History
- Dedication: Martin of Tours

Architecture
- Heritage designation: Grade II listed

Administration
- District: Bassetlaw
- Province: York
- Diocese: Diocese of Southwell and Nottingham
- Archdeaconry: Newark
- Deanery: Bassetlaw and Bawtry
- Parish: Bole with Saundby

Clergy
- Bishop(s): Bishop of Southwell & Nottingham and The Bishop of Sherwood
- Vicar: Rev M Cantrill
- Dean: Dean of Bassetlaw & Bawtry

St Martin's Church is a Grade II listed parish church in the Church of England in Bole, Nottinghamshire.

== History ==
The church dates from the 13th century. It was restored in 1866 by Ewan Christian.

== Bells ==
There are three bells at St Martin's Church.

The three bells are in a wooden frame for three bells with traditional fittings in a dilapidated state, making them unringable. The treble weighs 4 cwt, dated 1611 and cast by Henry II Oldfield, the second weighs 4.5 cwt, dated 1500+ and cast by John Seliok. The tenor weighs 5.5 cwt, dated 1611 and cast by Henry II Oldfield. The bells are rung from ground floor.

== Clock ==
There is evidence of there once being a clock at St Martin's church. The room under the bells is where the clock would have been situated. There is a picture of the church that was given to a vicar in the Second World War, that showed a clock face on the south side of the tower.

== Clays Group of Churches ==
- St John the Baptist, Clarborough
- St Peter, Hayton
- St Peter & St Paul, North Wheatley
- St Peter & St Paul, Sturton le Steeple;and
- St Martin, Bole
- St Martin, North Leverton
- All Saints, South Leverton

The Church of England church and the Methodist chapel in North Wheatley entered into a single sharing agreement and became "The Church in Wheatley". Sadly, due to cost prohibitive repairs, the Methodist Chapel was sold in 2023 as a housing development. At South Wheatley there are ruins of the church of St Helen.. St Martin, North Leverton, and All Saints, South Leverton, along with the Methodist Chapel form "The Church in the Levertons".

== Clergy ==
The Clays Group has the one Vicar, the Team Vicar, Rev M Cantrill who has the responsibility of all the above parishes. He is an ordained Church of England and Methodist Minister. He has the responsibility of Grove Street Methodist church, Retford. The Clays Group has a Lay Reader.

=== Vicars of Bole ===
Although a church at Bole was mentioned in Domesday Book, the names of most of its clergy before the late 14th century have been lost. Prior to 1864 the vicars had been non-resident in the parish for about two hundred years. Hence most of the routine work during this period would probably have been carried out by assistant curates.

- 1317-? Roger de Nassington (still vicar in 1335)
- (some names missing)
- 1377 John Attewell
- 1390 Gilbert Thynne (or Gilbert Tymme)
- 1429 John Pye
- 1443 Henry Marschall
- 1445 Richard Mydelom
- 1447 Thomas Mirfelde
- 1449 William Harrison
- 1451 Thomas Pesse
- ? ? William Worsley
- 1453 Robert Walker
- 1468 Robert Hogley
- 1474 Richard Nicholl
- 1483 Stephen Hobson
- 1485 Thomas Watson
- 1499 Thomas Randesby
- 1501 Simon Spynk
- 1503 John Clewgh
- 1522 Leonard Bower
- 1551 John Hudson
- 1558 Edmund Wingreve
- 1576 Robert Rogers
- 1598 John Noble
- 1599 Richard Molton
- 1619 Roland Campion
- 1624 Edward Barnes
- 1629 William Lacye
- 1632 Richard Baylye
- 1639 Nicholas Browne
- 1669 Stephen Maisters
- 1687 Robert Ward
- 1691 John Battersby
- 1711 William Ellay (Ella)
- 1714 Thomas Smith, BA (Cantab.); buried 17 May 1731 at North Leverton
- 1731 Charles Henchman BA, MA, instituted 15 December 1731/16 December 1731; died 23 November 1780; monumental inscription in Chester Cathedral)
- 1780 William Davis
- 1811 William Singleton
- 1836 James Henry Willan, MA, (non-resident; lived at Gainsborough where he also served as master of the Grammar School. Monumental inscription, 1858, in Bole churchyard)
- 1858 Henry Stockdale (formerly Perpetual Curate of Misterton; established Bole School and built The Vicarage)
- 1873 Thomas Henry Craster
- 1886 Frederick Harcourt Hillersden
- 1891 Thomas Holland Chadwick
- 1913 George Bird
- 1926 Donald Thomas Glasford
- 1941 John Thomas Gordon
- 1947 William Henry Marshall
- 1954 Arthur Llewelyn Thomas (he and his successors were also vicars of Sturton-le-Steeple with Littleborough)
- 1959 Charles John Llewelyn Jones
- 1965 John Norman Darrall
- 1966 Lawrence Rex Rowland Harris (later Rector of Clowne, Derbyshire)
- 1972 John Ford (he and his successors were additionally in charge of North Wheatley and South Wheatley)
- 1979 Adrian Butt
- 1986 Anthony Reader-Moore
- 1994 Michael Weston Briggs (also in charge of Clarborough from 2003; the various parishes eventually became known as the Clays Group). Retired 2005.
- 2007–present day - Mark James Cantrill

Assistant Curates have included:

- 1823 John Mickle Lit 14 February 1823 Curate (Subscription on Appointment, ordained Deacon 1815 and Priest 1817). Later Vicar of South Leverton.
- 1829 James Stovin BA Licensed 26 July 1829 Curate
- 1831 Thomas Curston BA Licensed 6 June 1831 Curate

== The Vicarage ==
Bole has a former Vicarage dating to 1864, but not used as such since 1965. It is now known as "Bole House" and was sold once again in 2009.

== See also ==
- Listed buildings in Bole, Nottinghamshire
