= Listed buildings in North and South Wheatley =

North and South Wheatley is a civil parish in the Bassetlaw District of Nottinghamshire, England. The parish contains 18 listed buildings that are recorded in the National Heritage List for England. Of these, one is listed at Grade I, the highest of the three grades, two are at Grade II*, the middle grade, and the others are at Grade II, the lowest grade. The parish contains the villages of North Wheatley and South Wheatley and the surrounding area. All the listed buildings are in the villages, and most of them are houses, farmhouses and farm buildings. The others include two churches, one a ruin, and the other with a listed war memorial in the churchyard, the walls of which are also listed.

== Key ==
Grade	Criteria
I	Buildings of exceptional interest, sometimes considered to be internationally important
II*	Particularly important buildings of more than special interest
II	Buildings of national importance and special interest

== Buildings ==
Name and location	Photograph	Date	Notes	Grade
Remains of Church of St. Helen; 53.36114°N 0.84983°W		12th century	The church has been a ruin since 1883, the remaining parts are in stone, and consist of the west tower and the chancel arch. The tower has a moulded plinth, a string course, an eaves band, a triple lancet window with a hood mould, two-light bell openings, the remains of gargoyles, and an embattled parapet. The tower arch is pointed, double-chamfered and rebated, and has octagonal imposts. The chancel arch is round-headed and has vestigial engaged colonnettes with square capitals.	I
St Peter and St Paul's Church, North Wheatley; 53.36422°N 0.85629°W		13th century	The church has been altered and extended through the centuries, including a restoration in 1896 by C. Hodgson Fowler. It is built in stone, with roofs in lead and slate. The church consists of a nave, a south porch, a chancel, a north chancel chapel, and a west tower. The tower has two stages, corner buttresses, a string course, a triple lancet window on the west side, two-light bell openings, an eaves band with the remains of gargoyles, and an embattled parapet.	II*
The Old Hall and Old Hall Farm House; 53.36319°N 0.85650°W		1673	A rear wing, forming the farmhouse, was added in the 19th century. The house is in brick on a chamfered plinth, with a moulded floor band, a frieze of modillion lunettes, modillion eaves, and pantile roofs with a plain tile verge. There are two storeys and four bays, and a lower rear wing with two storeys and four bays. In the second bay is a projecting two-storey porch containing a round-arched doorway with imposts and a moulded keystone. Above it is a datestone with a hood mould containing a coat of arms, and at the top is a lunette flanked by obelisk-shaped pilasters. The other bays contain mullioned and transomed casement windows. In the rear wing are casement windows with dentilled hood moulds, and gabled dormers.	II*
Bar Gate Farm House and outbuildings 53.36348°N 0.85809°W		Early 18th century	The farmhouse and outbuildings are in brick, with cogged and dentilled eaves, and pantile roofs with tumbled coped gables. The house has two storeys and attics and an L-shaped plan, with a main range of three bays, and a rear extension. In the centre is a doorway with a reeded surround and a hood, above which is a casement window with a segmental head. The other windows on the front are sashes, in the west front is a bow window, and the rear extension has casement windows. To the north is a stable containing a pair of doorways with an arched head, and other doorways.	II
Corner Farm House; 53.36172°N 0.85618°W		18th century	The farmhouse is in brick, with a floor band, cogged and dentilled eaves, and a pantile roof with stone coped tumbled gables. There are two storeys and attics, three bays, and a two-storey two-bay service wing to the right. The central doorway has a reeded surround, a fanlight, and a hood on scrolled brackets. To its left is a canted bay window, and the other windows are sashes with segmental heads. In the wing is a Classical doorway with a hood, and casement windows, those in the ground floor with segmental heads.	II
Jasmine Cottage; 53.36358°N 0.86142°W		Mid 18th century	A brick house, partly rendered, with cogged eaves, and a tile roof with tumbled coped gables. There are two storeys and attics, and two bays. The central doorway has plain jambs, the windows on the front are sashes, in the west gable end are casement windows, and in the attic is a small light.	II
Pigeoncote, barn and stable, Old Hall Farm; 53.36338°N 0.85732°W		18th century	The farm buildings are in brick with dentilled eaves, and pantile roofs with tumbled coped gables and kneelers. The pigeoncote has two storeys and a single bay, and contains a central doorway with a segmental head, a casement window, and two tiers of pigeonholes. Inside are wattle and daub nest boxes. The barn, at right angles, has two storeys and three bays, a central barn door, a casement window and horizontally-sliding sash windows, and the stable has a single storey and three bays.	II
Plum Tree Farm House; 53.36459°N 0.86330°W		Mid 18th century	A farmhouse in brick with a floor band, an eaves band, cogged and dentilled eaves, and pantile roofs with tumbled coped gables and kneelers. There are two storeys and an L-shaped plan, with three bays, one projecting. On the south front is a bow window, and the other windows are casements, some with segmental heads and one with mullions.	II
Pigeoncote, stable and barn, West Moor Farm; 53.36369°N 0.86291°W		18th century	The farm buildings are in brick with pantile roofs. The pigeoncote has dentilled eaves, and tumbled coped gables. There are two storeys and three bays. The central doorway has a segmental head, the windows are casements, and above are round blocked openings. On the front are three tiers of pigeonholes, and there are two tiers on the south gable. The stable has a single storey and a single bay, the barn has three unequal bays, a stable door, casement windows and vents, and the further stable has a single storey and four bays.	II
Pigeoncote and outbuilding, Corner Farm; 53.36159°N 0.85572°W		Late 18th century	The farm buildings are in brick with pantile roofs. The pigeoncote has a floor band, cogged and dentilled eaves, and tumbled coped gables. There are two storeys and two bays, and it contains a central doorway with a segmental head and casement windows. On the front and right return are two tiers of dentilled shelves and pigeonholes, and openings with segmental heads. To the west is a stable and a granary with two storeys and three bays, containing stable doors and casement windows with segmental heads and vents.	II
Old Hall Farm House; 53.36318°N 0.85732°W		Late 18th century	The farmhouse is in brick with a hipped pantile roof, and a stepped coped gable at the rear. There are two storeys, three bays and a rear wing. In the centre is a doorway, and the windows on the front are sashes, those in the ground floor with segmental heads. On the west front is a French window and horizontally-sliding sash windows with segmental heads.	II
Outbuilding, pigeoncote, barn and stables, Plum Tree Farm; 53.36437°N 0.86289°W		Late 18th century	The farm buildings are in brick with pantile roofs, and form three ranges around a yard, seven bays wide and four bays deep. The outbuilding at the north has a single storey and a single bay, and the pigeoncote to the east has two storeys and two bays, external steps, and contains two tiers of pigeonholes. The openings in the barn to the east include windows, stable doors, vents and pitching holes. The stable to the east has a single storey and four bays, and the stable to the south has a single storey and two bays.	II
Barns and pigeoncote, The Manor; 53.36133°N 0.85507°W		Late 18th century	Two barns at right angles containing an integral pigeoncote, later converted for other uses. They are in brick with cogged eaves and hipped pantile roofs. The buildings contain various openings, including barn doors, casement windows, some with segmental heads, vents in a diamond formation, and round openings.	II
Barn east of the Post Office; 53.36347°N 0.86175°W		1789	The barn is in brick on a rendered plinth, with dentilled eaves, and a pantile roof with coped gables and kneelers. It contains barn doors, a casement window and vents.	II
Former Plough Inn; 53.36483°N 0.86062°W		1821	The inn, later a private house, is in colourwashed brick, with dentilled eaves and a hipped pantile roof. There are two storeys and an L-shaped plan, with a front range of four bays, a lower two-storey rear wing, and a lean-to in the angle. The doorway has a segmental head and a fanlight, and above it is an initialled datestone. The windows on the front are sashes with segmental heads and keystones, and in the left return is a doorway that has a hood on brackets and suspension chains. At the rear are casement windows.	II
Boundary wall, St Peter and St Paul's Church, North Wheatley; 53.36400°N 0.85633°W		Early 19th century	The wall enclosing the churchyard is in stone with triangular coping. It contains an inscribed and dated stone, and three square stone gate piers with chamfered bases and pyramidal caps.	II
Cartshed, Old Hall Farm; 53.36331°N 0.85751°W		19th century	The cartshed is in brick with cogged eaves and a hipped pantile roof. There is a single storey and two bays, and the cartshed contains two cart openings with brick piers and timber lintels.	II
War memorial 53.36420°N 0.85664°W		1920	The war memorial is in the churchyard of St Peter and St Paul's Church, North Wheatley, and is in Hollington sandstone. It consists of a cross with the Crucifixion caved in relief. The cross has an octagonal shaft, on an octagonal plinth, on an octagonal base of three steps, on a square lower base. On the plinth is an inscribed bronze plaque.	II
