= St Peter and St Paul's Church, North Wheatley =

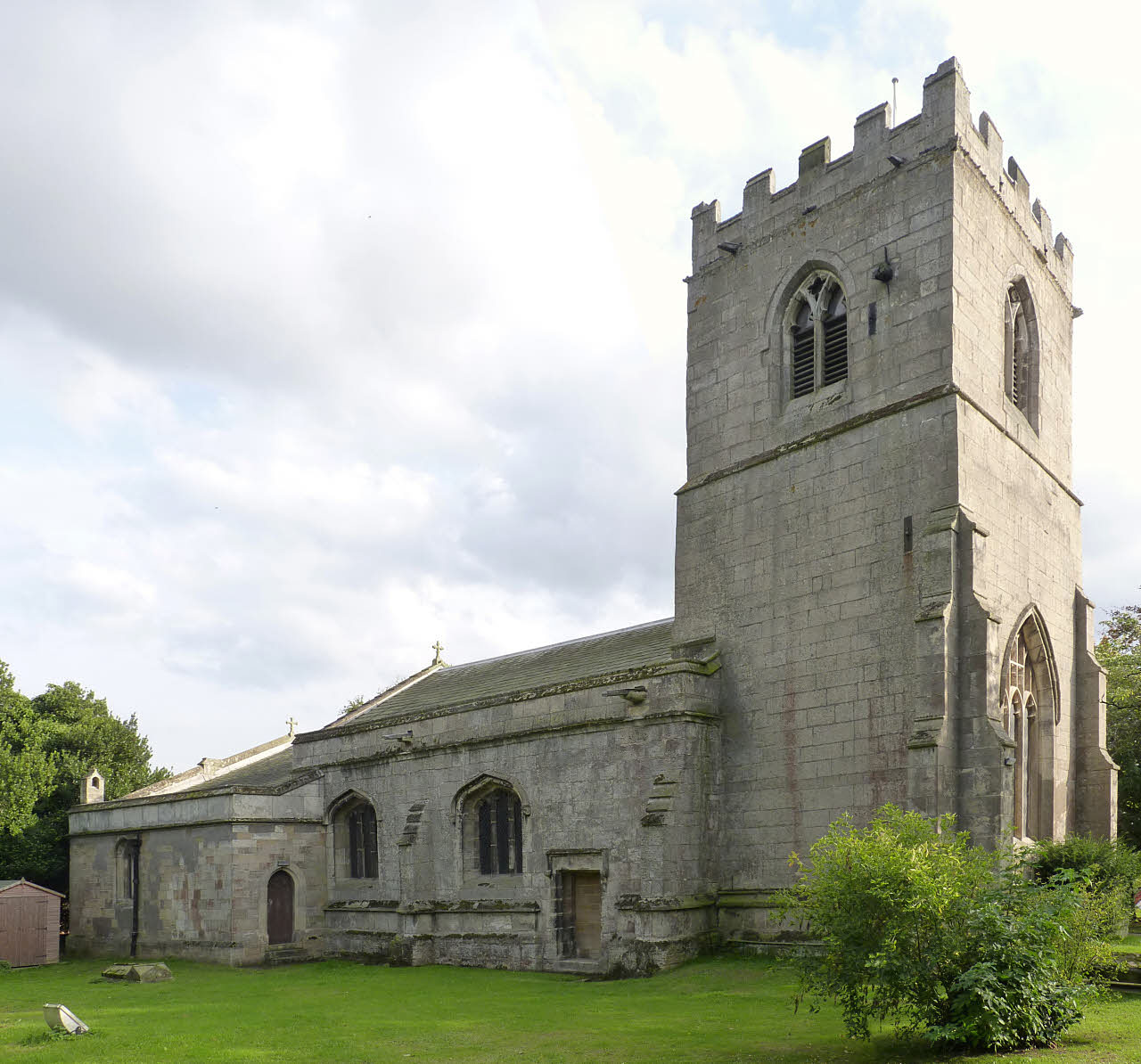
- St Peter and St Paul's Church, North Wheatley
- 53°21′48.92″N 0°51′23.00″W
- OS grid reference: SK 76210 85868
- Location: North Wheatley
- Country: England
- Denomination: Church of England

History
- Dedication: St Peter and St Paul

Architecture
- Heritage designation: Grade II* listed

Administration
- Province: York
- Diocese: Diocese of Southwell and Nottingham
- Archdeaconry: Newark
- Deanery: Bassetlaw and Bawtry
- Parish: North Wheatley

Clergy
- Archbishop: Archbishop of York
- Bishop(s): Bishop of Southwell & Nottingham & Bishop of Sherwood
- Vicar: Rev M Cantrill Vicar
- Dean: Rev Cash Dean of Bassetlaw & Bawtry

St Peter and St Paul's Church is a Grade II* listed parish church in the Church of England in North Wheatley.

== History and description ==
The church was built in the 13th century. The tower dates from around 1480. The chancel was added in 1824.

Gilbert White includes a brief description of the church itself, written in the 1853 Directory of Nottinghamshire. It has a tower with 5 bells, but the chancel was rebuilt in 1824.

The church was restored in 1896 by Charles Hodgson Fowler.

The current incumbent is Mark Cantrill.

Bells

North Wheatley has six bells. There is one bell frame made from timber in 1896 by Thomas Mallaby which contains all six bells. The treble weighs 3 cwt, dated 1896 and cast by John Warner & Son. The second weighs 3 cwt, dated 1958 and cast by John Taylor & Co. The third weighs 4 cwt, dated 1958 and cast by John Taylor & Co. The fourth weighs 5 cwt, dated 1958 and is cast by John Taylor & Co. The fifth weighs 5 cwt, dated 1793 and is cast by Thomas Hilton, the tenor weighs 8 cwt, dated 1793 and is cast by Thomas Hilton. In 1896 a treble was added. The bells are not rung ground floor, to access the ringing chamber you have to climb the old oak staircase and pre dates the 19th century. In July 1926, the foundations of the Church were in need of restoration, the tower was declared unsafe and was supported by an external wooden framework resulting in the bells remaining silent for 32 years. In 1958 a dedication service took place in the church when the bells were safe to be rung again, it was led by the Rev. Canon Wilkinson.

Clays Group of Churches

The Clays Group includes the following churches:

- St Peter, Hayton
- St John the Baptist, Clarborough
- St Peter & St Paul, Sturton le Steeple
- St Martin, Bole
- St Peter & St Paul, North Wheatley

Organ

The pipe organ was removed 40 years ago, there is a small electronic organ.

== See also ==
- Grade II* listed buildings in Nottinghamshire
- Listed buildings in North and South Wheatley
