= Listed buildings in Bole, Nottinghamshire =

Bole is a civil parish in the Bassetlaw District of Nottinghamshire, England. The parish contains two listed buildings that are recorded in the National Heritage List for England. Both the listed buildings are designated at Grade II, the lowest of the three grades, which is applied to "buildings of national importance and special interest". The parish contains the village of Bole and the surrounding area, and the listed buildings consist of a church and a farmhouse.

== Buildings ==
Name and location	Photograph	Date	Notes
St Martin's Church; 53.37485°N 0.80939°W		13th century	The church has been altered and extended through the centuries, including a restoration in 1865–66 by Ewan Christian. The church is built in stone with slate roofs, and consists of a nave, a south porch, a chancel and a west tower. The tower has two stages, diagonal buttresses, two string courses, and a west doorway with a pointed arch, above which is a triple lancet window. In the top stage are double lancet bell openings, over which is an eaves band with eight gargoyles, and an embattled parapet with eight crocketed pinnacles. Along the nave is an embattled parapet with pinnacles.
Bole Manor House and outbuilding 53.37501°N 0.80809°W		c. 1625	A farmhouse that has been altered, in red brick, partly rendered, on a rendered plinth, with patterned headers, moulded floor bands and eaves band, dentilled eaves, and a pantile roof with large shaped gables and kneelers. There are two storeys and four bays, a lower two- storey service wing to the north, further to the north a two-storey three-bay outbuilding, and a rear wing. On the main block is a gabled porch with a tile roof, and a doorway with a fanlight. The windows are mullioned and transomed.
