= CHPA =

CHPA may stand for:

- Combined Heat and Power Association
- Consumer Healthcare Products Association
