= James Naish =

British Labour politician (born 1988)

James Naish MP
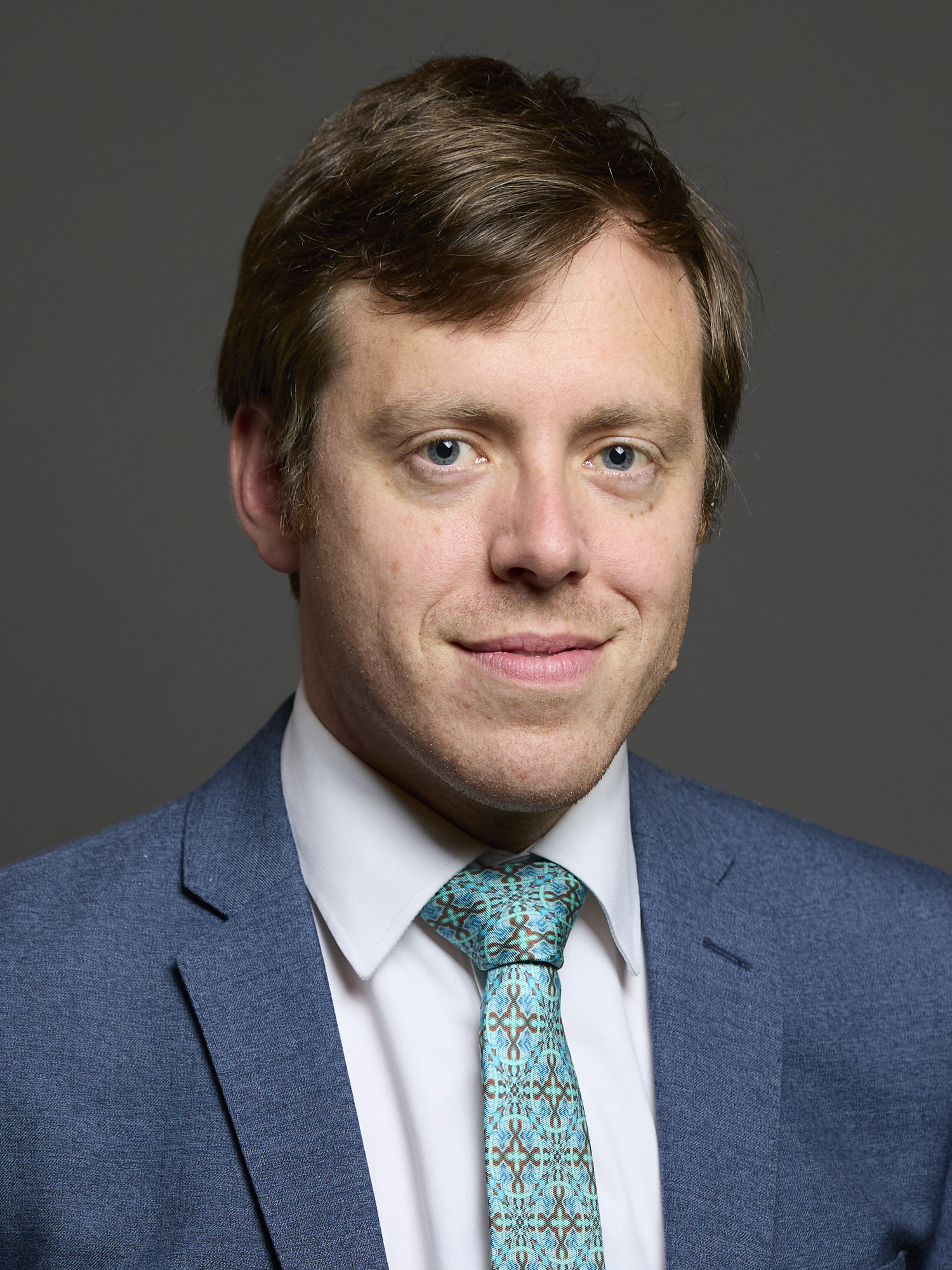
- Official portrait, 2024

Member of Parliament for Rushcliffe
- Incumbent
- Assumed office 4 July 2024
- Preceded by: Ruth Edwards
- Majority: 7,426 (12.8%)

Leader of Bassetlaw District Council
- In office 22 September 2022 – 25 July 2024

Personal details
- Born: James William Naish; 20 July 1988 (age 38) Sheffield, West Yorkshire, England
- Party: Labour
- Relatives: Sir David Naish (great-uncle) Alastair Campbell (uncle)
- Education: Mansfield College, Oxford (BA)
- Website: https://www.jamesnaish.com/

James William Naish (/ˈneɪʃ/; born 20 July 1988) is a British Labour Party politician and former energy sector professional, who has served as Member of Parliament (MP) for Rushcliffe since 2024. He is the first Labour MP to represent Rushcliffe since 1966.

== Early life and education ==
Born in Sheffield and raised on a farm in Nottinghamshire, Naish is the youngest of triplets. He attended Queen Elizabeth's High School in Gainsborough. Following this, he attended Mansfield College, Oxford, where he studied Modern History.

== Early career ==
After graduating, Naish worked for the Fortune 500 company Accenture, taking a sabbatical to work in the Prime Minister's Office in Albania. Naish subsequently worked largely in the energy sector, including as a Programme Manager for Northern Powergrid and SSE plc.

== Local government career ==
Naish was elected to Bassetlaw District Council, Nottinghamshire in May 2019, representing the rural Sturton ward, winning the seat for Labour for the first time. Naish was elected Leader of the Council in September 2022. He was subsequently re-elected in the 2023 local elections with 77.6% of the vote. During his time as Leader, Naish secured additional investment into the district, including the flagship Spherical Tokamak for Energy Production (STEP) prototype fusion energy plant being built at West Burton power station.

== Parliamentary career ==
Naish is a member of the International Development Committee, the House of Common's select committee responsible for scrutinising UK aid policy. He also serves as the Chair of the All-Party Parliamentary Group (APPG) for the East Midlands and is a Vice-President of the Association for Decentralised Energy.

In June 2025, Naish was appointed onto the Bill committee for the Football Governance Bill, engaging in line-by-line scrutiny of the bill.

For his first year in office, Naish served as the Chair of the APPG for Fusion Energy. During his term, the government awarded £2.5 billion in funding to fusion energy research and development.

Naish serves as the Vice-Chair of the Labour Rural Research Group (LRRG), a caucus of Labour MPs representing rural and semi-rural communities across the UK. The Group was known to be critical of proposed changes to inheritance tax on agricultural assets.

== Political positions ==
Naish has spoken in support of the UK having much closer ties with the European Union, believing that "Britain is strongest when it is connected, co-operative and engaged with its European neighbours". On 10 December 2025, Naish was among 13 Labour MPs who voted in support of negotiating a UK-EU Customs Union with the European Union, in a ten minute rule motion vote.

A supporter of electoral reform and a member of the APPG for Fair Elections, on 3 December 2024, Naish was among 59 Labour MPs who voted in support of proportional representation in a ten minute rule motion vote.

Since being elected, Naish has been a staunch advocate for the interests of Hongkongers in the United Kingdom on issues affecting the community, leading calls to maintain the British National (Overseas) visa route as a route for Hongkongers to "repatriate" to the UK following the imposition of the 2020 Hong Kong national security law. In 2025, Naish was appointed as a patron of UK-based human rights organisation Hong Kong Watch. He is also a member of the Inter-Parliamentary Alliance on China and has called for the release of British citizen, Jimmy Lai.

Naish has also led calls for the British Government to strengthen protections for wildlife through changes to existing outdated laws.

While considering the current law on assisted dying to be "broken" and in need of reform, Naish voted against the Terminally Ill Adults (End of Life) Bill at its second and third readings. However, in March 2026, he brought a petition to parliament calling for the Bill to be progressed before prorogation, in line with the Commons' wishes.

== Personal life ==
Naish is the great-nephew of Sir David Naish, who was National President of the National Farmers' Union from 1991 to 1998, and the nephew of Alastair Campbell, who served as Press Secretary to Tony Blair from 1994 to 2003.
