= South Wheatley, Nottinghamshire =

Settlement in Nottinghamshire, England

Coordinates: 53.361°N 0.853°W

South Wheatley
- Village
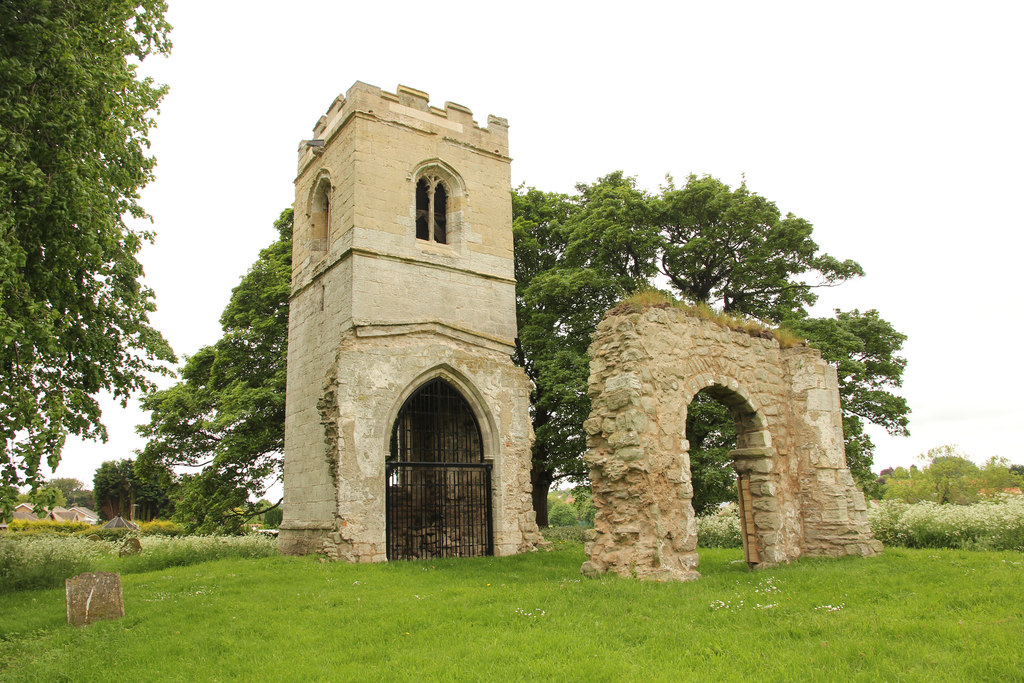
- Church of St. Helen's ruins

- Location within Nottinghamshire
- Population: 102 (2001)
- OS grid reference: SK 76375 85549
- Civil parish: North and South Wheatley
- District: Bassetlaw
- Shire county: Nottinghamshire
- Region: East Midlands
- Country: England
- Sovereign state: United Kingdom
- Post town: Retford
- Postcode district: DN22
- Dialling code: 01427
- Police: Nottinghamshire
- Fire: Nottinghamshire
- Ambulance: East Midlands
- UK Parliament: Bassetlaw
- Website: Village Website

Map

South Wheatley is a village and former civil parish, now within the North and South Wheatley civil parish, of Bassetlaw district, in the county of Nottinghamshire, England. In 2001 South Wheatley parish had a population of 102. It is 130 miles north of London, 30 miles north east of the county town of Nottingham, and 5 miles north east of the Nottinghamshire town of Retford. There are 4 listed buildings in South Wheatley.

== Geography ==
=== Location ===
South Wheatley is in the north of the county, and the east of the district.

It is surrounded by the following local villages:

- North Wheatley to the north
- Clarborough to the south
- Bole, Saundby, Sturton Le Steeple and West Burton to the east
- Clayworth and Hayton to the west.

South Wheatley is south of the Wheatley Beck stream. North Wheatley is directly adjacent to the village. It is much smaller than North Wheatley but mainly residential, it maintains amenities such as a primary school, village hall and some leisure facilities.

==== Landscape features ====
The Wheatley Beck stream flows west to east through the parish and separates the two villages, before eventually draining into the River Trent.

The village is low-lying, at approximately 20–25 metres (66–82 ft) and is slightly lower than North Wheatley

== Governance and demography ==
South Wheatley has been combined since 2015 with North Wheatley to form a parish for administrative identity.

It is managed at this first level of public administration by North Wheatley and South Wheatley Parish Council.

South Wheatley last provided a population count in 2001 of 102 residents.

At district level, the wider area is managed by Bassetlaw District Council.

Nottinghamshire County Council provides the highest level strategic services locally.

== History ==
=== Toponymy ===
Wheatley was recorded in the Domesday Book as Watelaie. The name "Wheatley" means 'Woodland clearing growing with wheat'. On 1 April 2015 the parish was abolished and merged with North Wheatley to form "North and South Wheatley".

=== Roman period and later ===
The villages dates back to Romans times and prior. The Roman Road from Lincoln crosses the River Trent at Littleborough and goes through South Wheatley and North Wheatley before reaching Doncaster. Roman coins were found in the village.

There are numerous theories about a Roman settlement in Wheatley, a possible Roman villa on the playing field, but no hard evidence. Roman coins have also been found on Chapel field, situated alongside the road. A Roman fantail bow brooch with pin and catchplate were also found in South Wheatley, as well as coins and a love token in the chapel field. These items are now in the Bassetlaw Museum in Retford.

Around the time of Domesday (1086), Wheatley is recorded of having come under part ownership of the Archbishop of York. The rest came under the tenure of Roger de Busli. Landowners in later centuries became fragmented, they included the Markham family, the Earl of Shrewsbury, Lord Middleton and Marquess of Dorchester. Many of the dwellings in South Wheatley were primarily farmhouses for housing agricultural workers as the parish was mainly rural, with much of the surrounding land used for that purpose.

== Community & leisure ==
A village hall is at South Wheatley, which also services North Wheatley.

The Recreation Ground in South Wheatley lends itself to multi-use community events and sport activities, along with a children's playground.

The Trent Valley Way long-distance path runs through the village.

== Landmarks ==
=== Development protection area ===
There is a conservation area defined for South (along with North) Wheatley.

=== Listed buildings ===
There are 4 listed buildings in South Wheatley, including the remains of Church of St Helen, designated Grade I and a scheduled monument.

== Religious sites ==
=== St Helen's Church ===
The church was thought to have been built in the 11th century, the surviving ruins of St Helen's consist only of an arch and its tower. The church was declared redundant in 1883 and subsequently demolished, its walls pulled down by traction engines. The stone from the church was used to repair walls in the village, with the altar being taken to St Peter and St Paul church in North Wheatley.

== Education ==
North Wheatley Church of England primary school is in South Wheatley.

== Sport ==
Several group activities take place primarily in South Wheatley on the multi-use Recreation Ground:

- Cricket
- Football pitches
- Tennis courts

Bowls takes place on its own dedicated field with a local club.

== See also ==
- Listed buildings in North and South Wheatley
