= West Burton, Nottinghamshire =

Hamlet and civil parish in Nottinghamshire, England

Coordinates: 53.36859°N 0.81568°W

West Burton
- Hamlet and civil parish
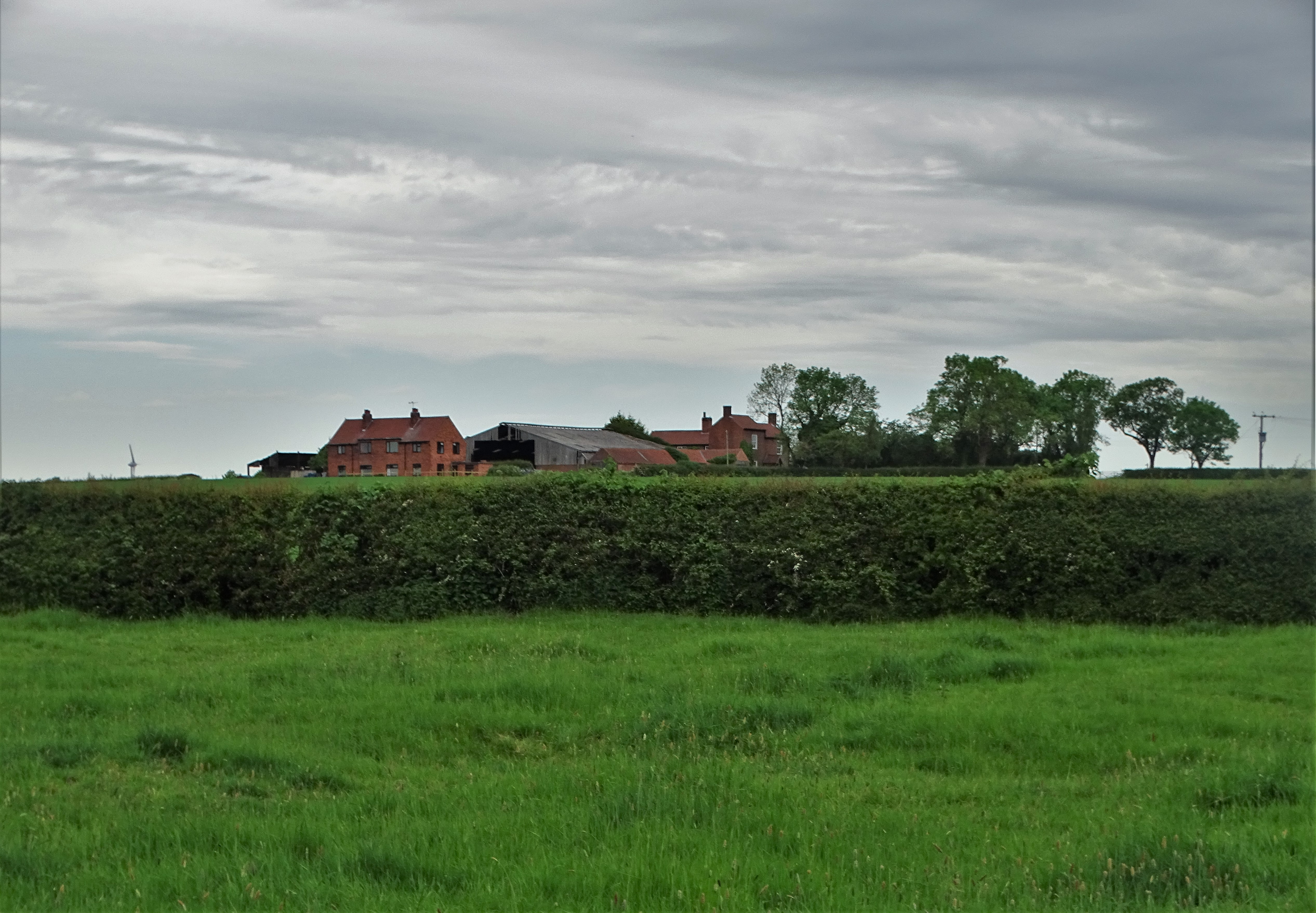
- High House Farm

- Location within Nottinghamshire
- Interactive map of West Burton
- Area: 1.49 sq mi (3.9 km^{2})
- Population: 14 (2021)
  - Density: 9/sq mi (3.5/km^{2})
- OS grid reference: SK 800851
  - London: 130 mi (210 km) SSE
- District: Bassetlaw
- Shire county: Nottinghamshire
- Region: East Midlands
- Country: England
- Sovereign state: United Kingdom
- Post town: Retford
- Postcode district: DN22
- Dialling code: 01427
- Police: Nottinghamshire
- Fire: Nottinghamshire
- Ambulance: East Midlands
- UK Parliament: Bassetlaw
- Website: www.sturtonlesteepleparishcouncil.gov.uk (neighbouring council)

West Burton is a Hamlet and civil parish in Nottinghamshire, England, located in the north-east of the county within the district of Bassetlaw. It lies between the villages of Bole and Sturton le Steeple. The Saxon name "burh-ton" states a fortified farmstead with the village lying to the west of Gate Burton in Lincolnshire. The recorded population at the 2021 census was 14 residents.

== Oxbow lakes ==
West Burton was originally based around a now-deserted village, which went into terminal decline when the course of the River Trent altered sometime around 1797. For many years afterwards the total recorded population was less than 60, and the residential part of the parish had effectively been reduced to just one or two scattered farms and their neighbouring cottages – notably Grange Farm and High House Farm. West Burton was originally on the side of the oxbow lake known as the Burton Round; a similar oxbow lake known as Bole Round or 'No Mans Friend' was situated just adjacent to Bole. A flood in February 1792, cut through 'No Mans Friend' which was subsequently reported in the local press.

“A very singular event has lately taken place at Gainsborough, in Lincolnshire:- At Bole Ferry the Trent has formed itself a new channel, through which on Thursday se’nnight, two vessels passed abreast. Eighty or ninety acres of fine pasture land, the property of Sir E. Anderson, and Miss Hickman, are cut quite away from the Lincolnshire side of the river, and a complete island is formed between the late and present channel.”

At Burton Round the Trent here took a circular sweep that a boatman might have thrown his hat on shore and after sailing two miles taken it up again. The Burton Round is referred to in Shakespeare's play Henry IV - Part 1

"Methinks my moiety, north from Burton here,

In quantity equals not one of yours:
See how this river comes me cranking in,
And cuts me from the best of all my land
A huge half-moon, a monstrous cantle out.
I'll have the current in this place damm'd up;
And here the smug and silver Trent shall run
In a new channel, fair and evenly;
It shall not wind with such a deep indent,
To rob me of so rich a bottom here.”

== Church of St Helen ==
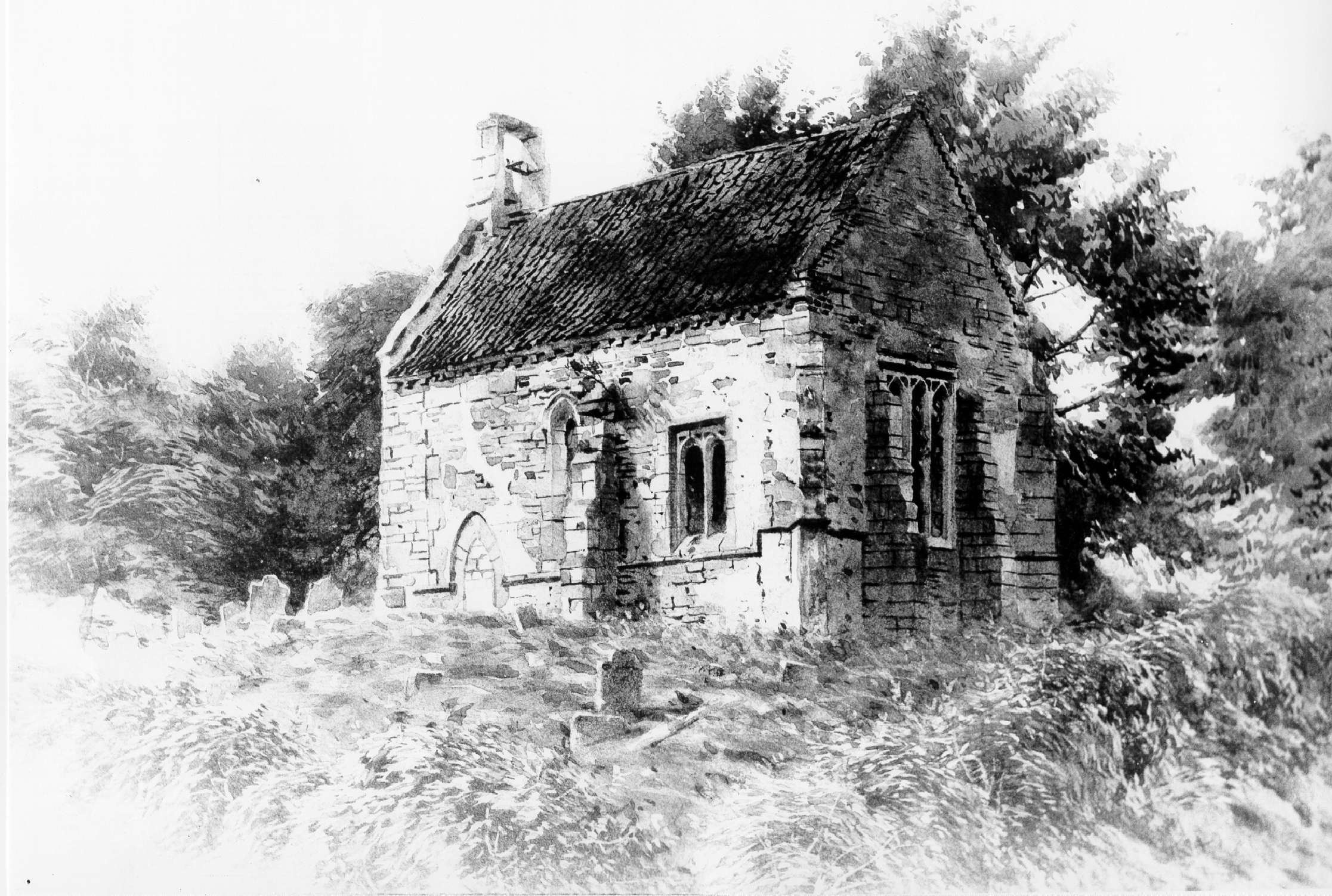
West Burton Church

The ecclesiastical parish of West Burton was joined to the benefice of North Wheatley in 1884, even though these two adjacent places had no direct connection by road. The disused church of St Helen, founded in medieval times and previously served by a perpetual curate, was finally demolished around 1886, although annual harvest thanksgiving services were later revived upon its site in the 20th century, and these continued for many years.

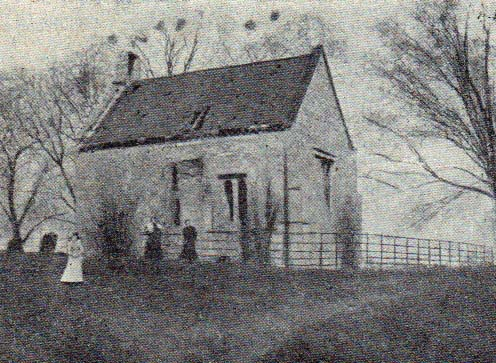
A further image of the church

The site is a Scheduled Ancient Monument [No.29915].

=== Bells ===
In 1764 two bells were recorded, however in 1832, Sir Stephen Glynne noted only a single bell. A drawing of the church in 1875 shows only one bell.

== Stirling bomber crash ==
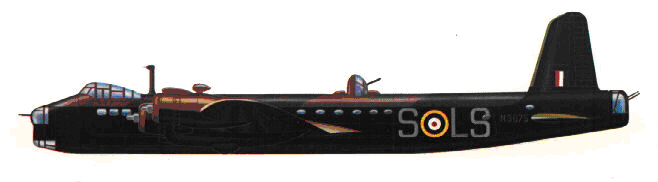
Short Stirling

On the evening of 24 April 1944, Short Stirling Mk3 LK552 JF-C manufactured by the Austin Motor Company from No. 1654 Heavy Conversion Unit RAF Wigsley in Nottinghamshire took part in a night navigational exercise. The pilot was Pilot Officer Lee from No. 65 Course. At 11,000 feet and 0105 hours, nearing the end of the exercise, the port inner engine failed but the port outer engine was inadvertently shut down. With both port engines inoperative the pilot was unable to control the aircraft. All the crew bailed out near the Cheese House in West Burton.

== West Burton Power Station ==
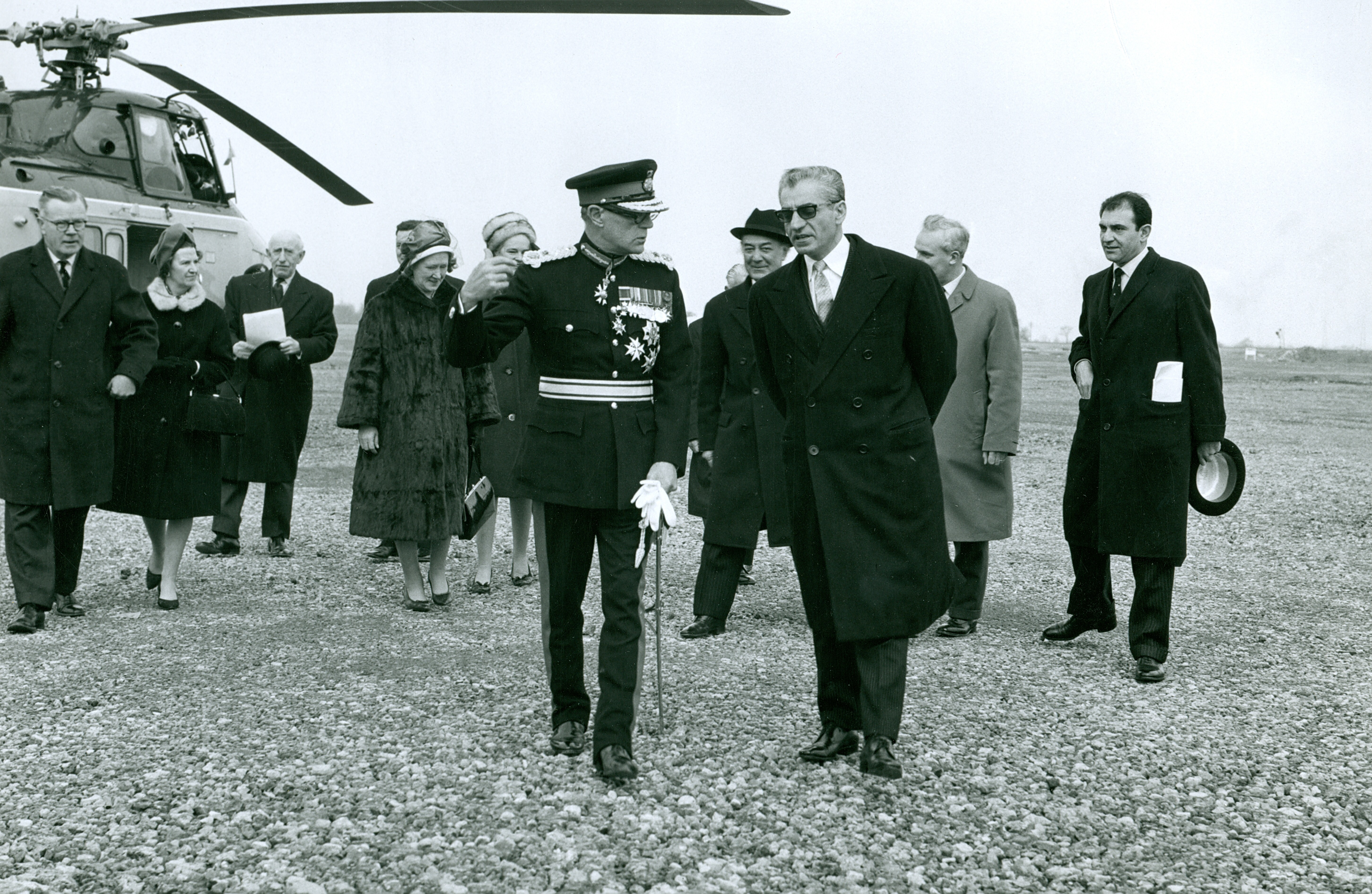
Shah of Iran at West Burton, 1965

The quiet and largely agricultural character of the area underwent a total transformation in the years following February 1961, when the Central Electricity Generating Board received consent for the building of the first West Burton Power Station, at that time intended for completion in 1967. This was constructed on land surrounding the original deserted hamlet, and in subsequent years its cooling towers have totally dominated the surrounding countryside.

The power station was the first 2000MW station to be constructed in the UK and therefore attracted a large overseas interest at West Burton including Mohammad Reza Pahlavi the Shah of Iran in 1965.

Low Farm was demolished in 1992 by National Power, it was the last remaining building in the close proximity of the old deserted village.

A topographical survey of the deserted village of West Burton was carried out by a team from Nottinghamshire County Council's community archaeology service in 2008–09.
