= Bole, Nottinghamshire =

Coordinates: 53.374°N 0.811°W

Bole
- Village and Civil parish
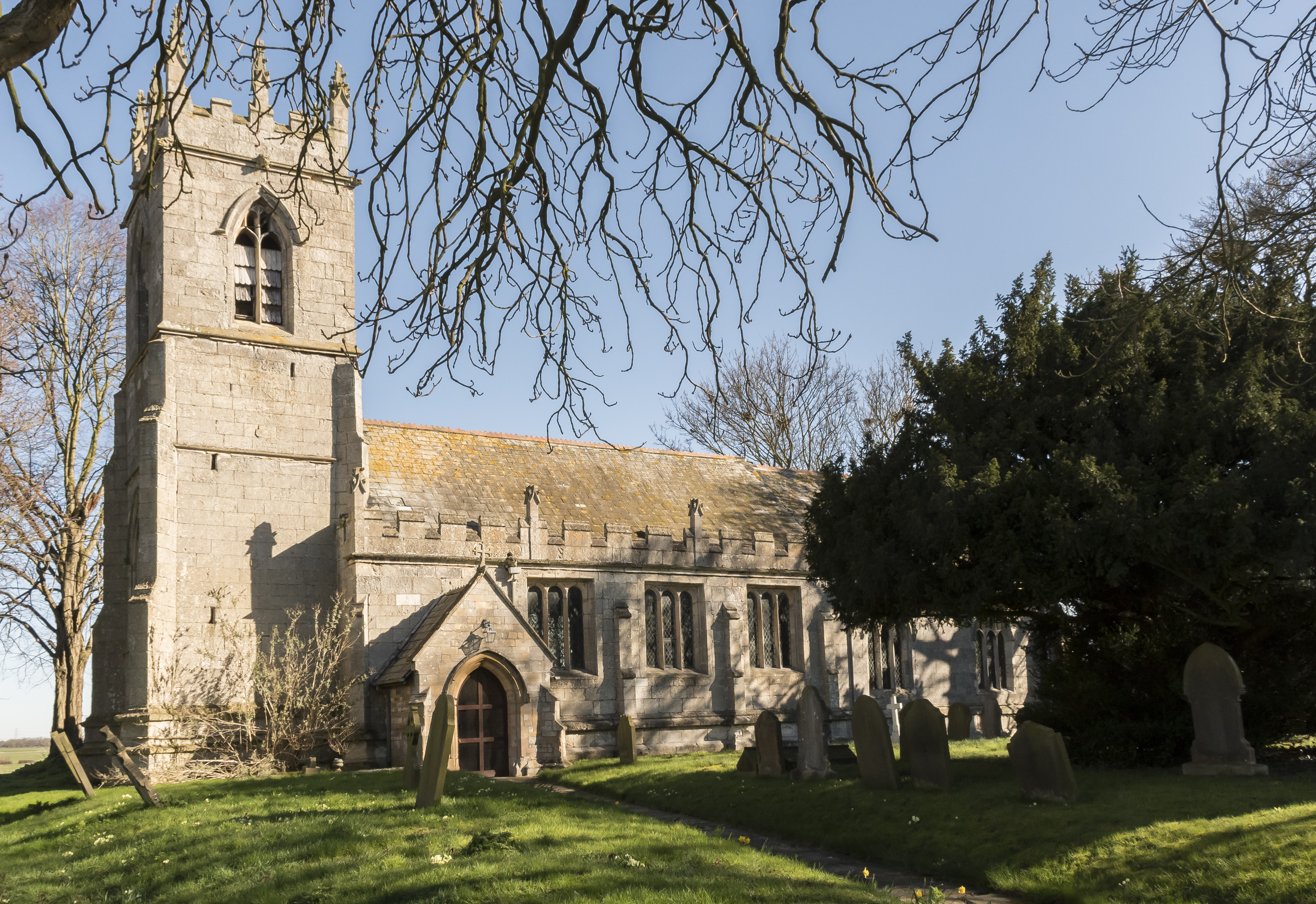
- St Martin's Church

- Location within Nottinghamshire
- Interactive map of Bole
- Area: 2.12 sq mi (5.5 km^{2})
- Population: 135 (2021 Census)
  - Density: 64/sq mi (25/km^{2})
- OS grid reference: SK 791870
  - London: 130 mi (210 km) SE
- District: Bassetlaw
- Shire county: Nottinghamshire
- Region: East Midlands
- Country: England
- Sovereign state: United Kingdom
- Post town: RETFORD
- Postcode district: DN22
- Dialling code: 01427
- Police: Nottinghamshire
- Fire: Nottinghamshire
- Ambulance: East Midlands
- UK Parliament: Bassetlaw

Bole is a village and civil parish in the Bassetlaw district of Nottinghamshire, England. It is close by the River Trent, on the eastern side of which is Gainsborough in Lincolnshire. At one time the village stood – like the neighbouring parish of West Burton – very near to an oxbow lake, known as Bole Round. However flooding led to the original course of the River Trent being diverted after 1792. The parish now lies within a landscape largely dominated by the West Burton power stations. According to the 2001 census Bole had a population of 140, a count of 247 at the 2011 census (which included South Wheatley and West Burton parishes), and singularly reported as 135 in 2021.

== History ==
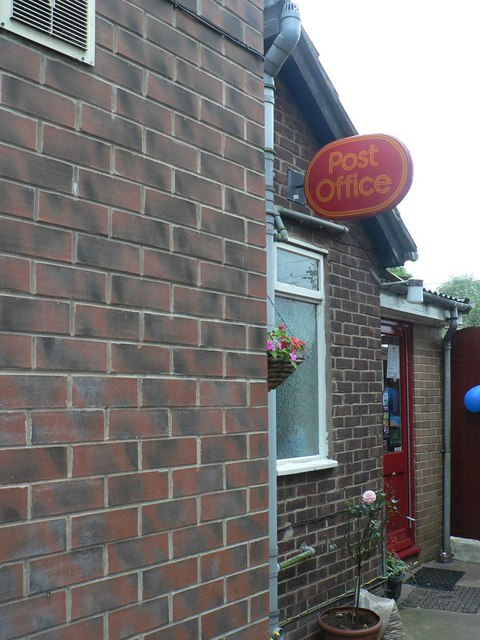
Former Bole Post Office

The parish church of St Martin was extensively rebuilt in 1865–66 by Ewan Christian. In former times the village also had shops, public houses and a post office.

The original church was mentioned in the Domesday survey of 1086. From an early date the vicarage was in the patronage of the prebendary of Bole, being until 1841 part of the Peculiar jurisdiction of the Dean and chapter of York. During the early 19th century the manor of Bole or Bolum was held by Lord Wenlock. However, in 1858 the Bole estate was transferred to the use of Lord Middleton, head of the Willoughby family from Wollaton Hall.

The old National school was built in 1859 but closed during the early 1950s. It now serves as the village hall. A small Methodist (originally Wesleyan) chapel was also closed during the early 1960s, being sold and converted for residential use.

There was a windmill close to the Gainsborough road (grid reference SK789864). Manor Farm, a listed building next to Bole Church, includes earlier portions dating from c1675.

A former teenage resident of the village was Henrietta Stockdale, later to become distinguished as a pioneer of nursing and nursing registration in South Africa. Her father became vicar of the parish in 1858, establishing the parochial school and also building the old vicarage (now known as Bole House), where the family was finally able to move in 1864. Bole had previously not had a resident priest for more than two hundred years.

== See also ==
- Listed buildings in Bole, Nottinghamshire
