= Association for Decentralised Energy =

British advocacy group

The Association for Decentralised Energy
- Abbreviation: ADE
- Formation: 1967
- Legal status: Non-profit company
- Purpose: Combined heat and power, district heating and demand side services in the United Kingdom
- Location: 6th Floor, 10 Dean Farrar Street, London, SW1H 0DX
- Region served: UK
- Members: c. 160 including energy, construction and manufacturing companies, universities and local councils
- Chief Executive: Aaron Gould (Interim CEO while Caroline Bragg is on maternity leave for 2026)
- Website: www.theade.co.uk

The Association for Decentralised Energy (ADE), formerly the Combined Heat and Power Association, is a trade association that supports the growth of decentralised energy systems, such as district heating systems. The association is based in London. The ADE was founded in 1967 as the District Heating Association, becoming the Combined Heat and Power Association in 1983, and was then renamed to the Association for Decentralised Energy on 12 January 2015.

The Association merged with the Association for the Conservation of Energy in 2018. ADE represents 160 organisations within the energy sector.

The ADE acts as an advocate for its members by engaging with Government and decision makers to support cost effective and efficient solutions to industry, businesses and householders by:

- Developing a policy which puts the energy user's needs first
- Delivering a local, low carbon energy system at lowest cost
- Ensuring an understanding of heat, which makes up half of our energy use
- Taking an integrated and 'systems thinking' approach
- Helping users manage energy demand to limit the need for new generation capacity
- Strengthening the sector's reputation through industry standards and best practice

The Association also sponsors the voluntary consumer-protection scheme, which is run by Heat Trust.

When asked whether the Greater London Authority were members of the ADE task force on heat network investment, in 2017, the GLA answered that this "is made up of investors, developers, local authorities, and consumer representatives, and will be observed by Ofgem, the UK and Scottish Governments, and the Competition and Markets Authority", as such the GLA are not eligible members as they do not implement or run heat networks.

== Functions ==
In April 2025, ADE split into two functions, ADE: Demand and ADE: Heat Networks.

=== ADE: Demand ===
Among ADE: Demand's membership are flexibility aggregators, rural commercial and industrial sites, as well as thermal storage companies.

ADE: Demand was set up with the vision that:

- Energy demand is given equal consideration to generation
- That every household, commercial business and industrial site has a commercially viable path to decarbonisation
- Energy consumers shouldn’t have to work around the energy system, the energy system should work around them

ADE: Demand's work, includes a 2025 report entitled "Consumer-Led Clean Power" which calls for changes that would allow anyone with solar panels, heat pumps, factory machinery or data centres to earn money for using energy when capacity is high and to defer use when renewables output is low. It recommends paying suppliers of stored power (that they generate) a fair price and encourages the government to incentivise businesses to engage in grid-balancing schemes, by reducing bureaucracy.

=== ADE: Heat Networks ===
ADE: Heat Networks represents city-wide district heating, as well as smaller scale heat networks using ground source heat pumps and shared ground loops.

The function's vision is to highlight the role these technologies can play in decarbonising heat in the UK whether that's at scale across the UK's densely populated cities or in more localised areas.

== ADE Vice President Network ==
ADE has a Vice President network comprising more than 30 individuals. The majority are MPs from across the political spectrum, including the Labour, Conservative, Liberal Democrat and Green parties. The network also includes Members of the House of Lords and leading experts from the energy sector.

== See also ==
- Department for Energy Security and Net Zero
