= North Wheatley =

Coordinates: 53.36232°N 0.85635°W

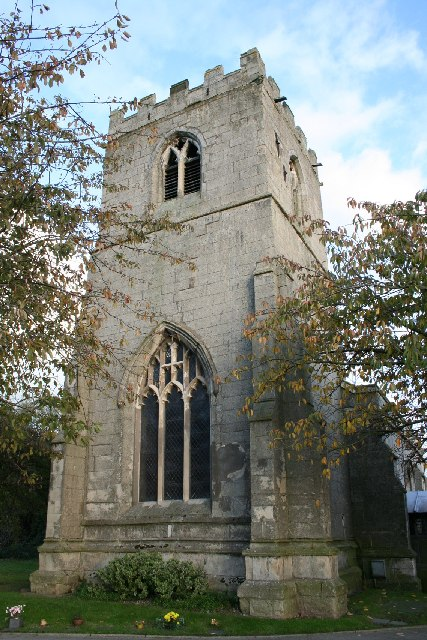
- Church of St. Peter and St. Paul's

- Location within Nottinghamshire
- Population: 509 (2011)
- OS grid reference: SK7620585659
- Civil parish: North and South Wheatley
- District: Bassetlaw
- Shire county: Nottinghamshire
- Region: East Midlands
- Country: England
- Sovereign state: United Kingdom
- Post town: RETFORD
- Postcode district: DN22
- Dialling code: 01427
- Police: Nottinghamshire
- Fire: Nottinghamshire
- Ambulance: East Midlands
- UK Parliament: Newark
- Website: Village Website

North Wheatley is a village and former civil parish, now in the parish of North and South Wheatley, in Bassetlaw district, in the county of Nottinghamshire, England. At the time of the 2001 census it had a population of 489, increasing to 509 at the 2011 census. It is located 6 miles north-east of Retford. The village has a number of 17th century brick houses. The Old Hall on Low Street/Church Hill is dated 1673, with the arms of the Cartwright family. The parish church of St Peter and St Paul was restored in 1896. Many farms in the area have dovecotes, either as free-standing buildings or above farm buildings. On 1 April 2015 the civil parish was merged with South Wheatley to form "North and South Wheatley".

== Origin of name ==
Wheatley is of Anglo-Saxon origin and it means "open land" (from Anglo-Saxon leah) either "of wheat" (Anglo-Saxon hwaete), or "by the water" (Anglo-Saxon waeter). The village is next to the Trent, built on clay and prone to flooding, so there is a strong local link to water. In the Domesday Book it is referred to as Wateleia.

== Geography ==
A bypass road was begun in 1937, known as the 'Wheatley By-Pass Road', to cost £12,000, and was opened in mid-1938.

== History ==
Wheatley lay on the Roman road Ermine Street between Lincoln and Doncaster. Roman artefacts have been found locally, including a Roman tombstone. It is not mentioned in the Domesday Book, even though it was comprised 25 villages and 4 freemen. The tenant-in-chief at this time was Roger de Busli.

The open fields in North Wheatley were enclosed in 1837. By 1853 the population had risen to 427 and the principal owner was Lord Middleton.

The Middleton Wheatley Foundation Trust was established in 1981 by Lord Middleton with the proceeds from the sale of the old school house. It aims to promote education, religion in particular, in the village. Interest from the trust's investments are distributed to charitable projects in these areas three times each year.

== Places of worship ==
=== Church of St Peter and St Paul ===
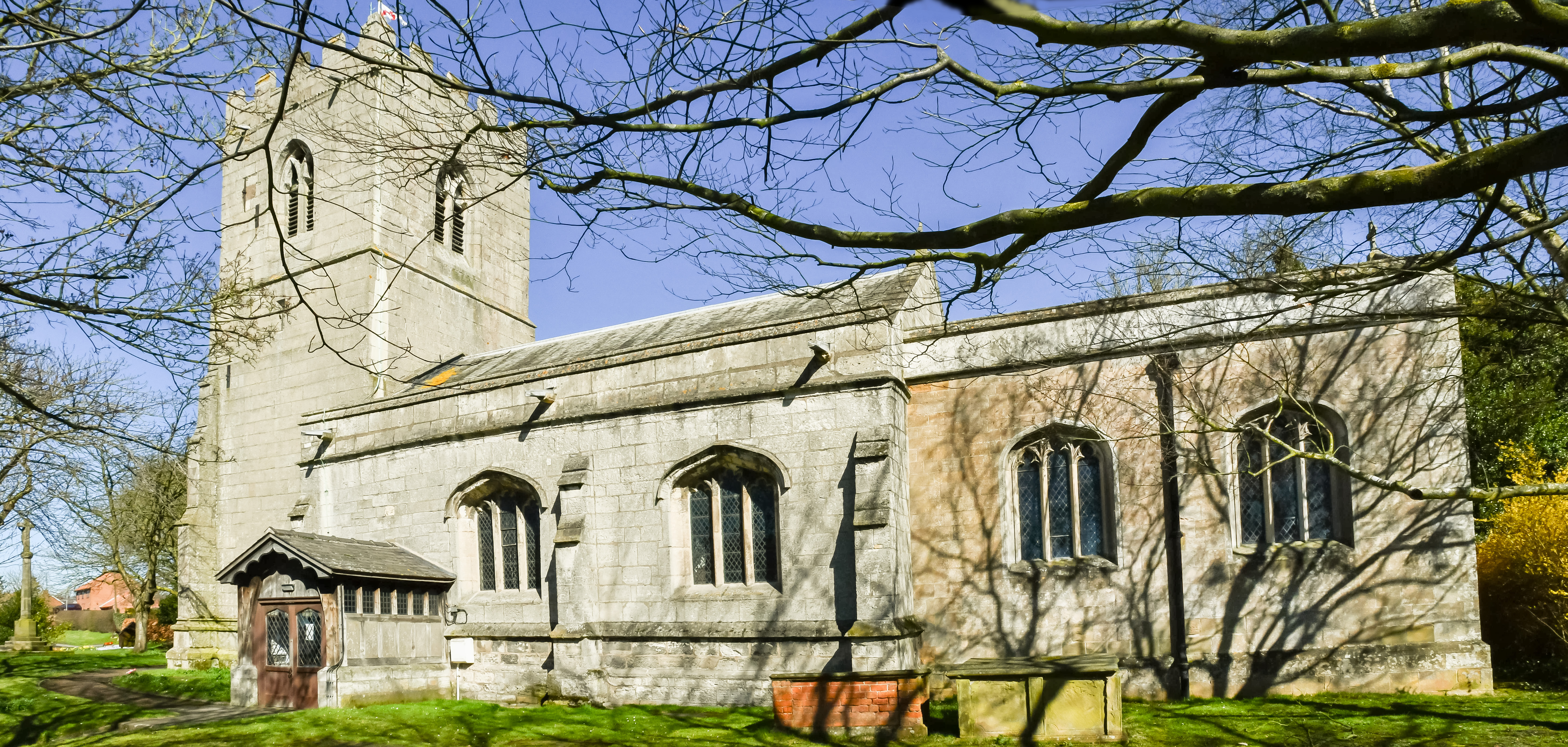
The church of St Peter and St Paul, North Wheatley

The church was built in the 13th century, and is dedicated to St Peter and St Paul. Gilbert White includes a brief description of the Church itself, written in the 1853 Directory of Nottinghamshire. It has a tower with 5 bells, but the Chancel was rebuilt in 1824.

In 1896, the Church was restored by architect Hodgson Fowler. In 1967 it was listed as a Grade II* listed building. It is still in use with a church service on most Sundays (Note: Details of this are listed in the appropriate referenced website.) at 10.30 am in either Church or Chapel. The current Incumbent is Reverend Mark Cantrill.

The churchyard contains a Calvary Cross (Grade II listed) that commemorates the men of North and South Wheatley who died in World War I. It was restored in 2016.

=== St Helen's Church ===
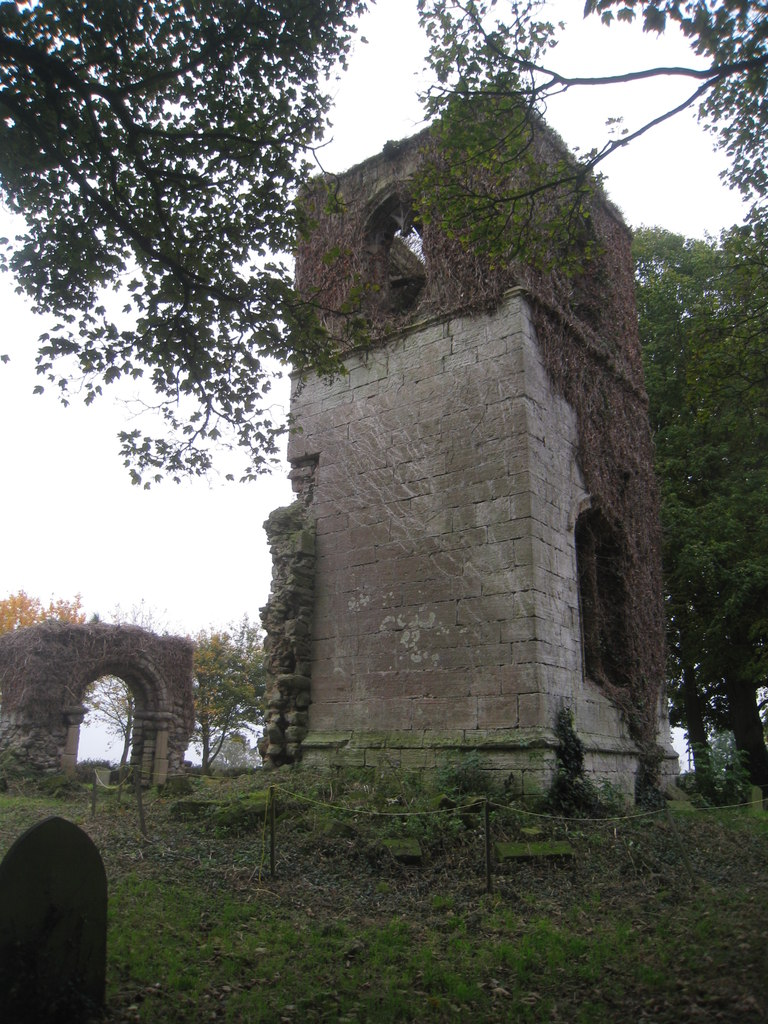
The ruins of St. Helen's church, South Wheatley

Thought to have been built in the 11th century, the surviving ruins of St Helen's church consist of a free standing arch and tower, which has an integral spiral staircase to the ringing chamber and the remains of a frame for 3 bells. The church was declared redundant in 1883 and subsequently demolished, its walls pulled down by traction engines. The stone from the church was used to repair walls in the village. The altar was taken to St Peter and St Paul in North Wheatley. The font was sent to St Catherine in Nottingham.

In 2013, a project funded by English Heritage and Nottinghamshire County Council was undertaken to restore the ruins. In 2014 additional seating, some informational signs, and a memorial garden were added.

== School ==
The North Wheatley Church of England Primary School teaches pupils between the ages of 3 and 11, and has approximately 96 students. It was rated as 'Outstanding' by Ofsted in its last inspection (2015). The school is a feeder school for Tuxford Academy.

== Population ==
The population of North Wheatley remained roughly stable between 1801 (population 371) and 1961 (334). Since 1961 it has risen and the Census in 2001 showed that there were 489 residents of which 167 were aged 45–64. By 2007, the population of the village was roughly 650, with the average age of these residents being 42. The percentage of students living in the North Wheatley area is just 1.4%, compared to the national average of 4.4%.

== Local economy ==
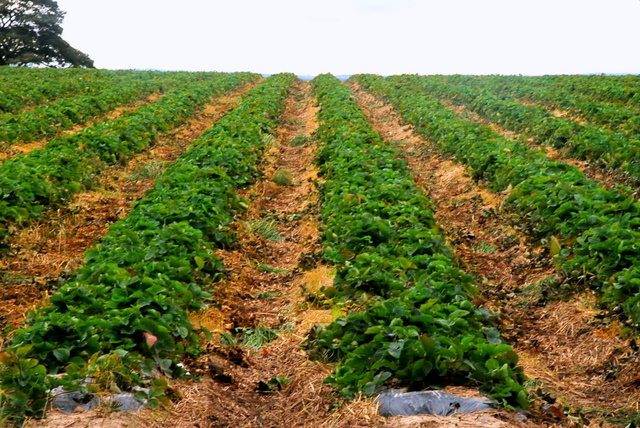
Strawberry fields around Wheatley

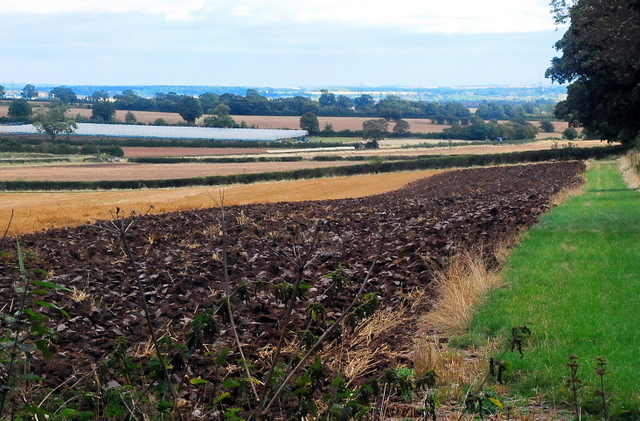
Ploughed fields in Wheatley, with strawberry polytunnels in background

Almost 200 years ago, census information shows us that more than half of males in North Wheatley aged 20 and over were Agricultural Laborers. The village still has a strong agricultural economy, with a good rate of local employment. Strawberries are traditionally associated with the village due to the number of strawberry farms in the immediate area. Many of these allow customers to 'pick your own', though the number offering this has diminished in recent years. The village is so strongly associated with strawberries that a strawberry is used as the centrepiece of the logo on the official village website.

The village has a church, chapel, pub (closed), three shops, village hall and other amenities. In the 2001 Census, there were 355 people aged 16–74 in North Wheatley. Of these, 232 were employed, 111 were economically inactive and 12 were unemployed.

== Sports ==
The village has a number of sporting facilities and clubs. The village playing fields, which lie at the boundary between North and South Wheatley, have a field for cricket and football and courts for Wheatley Tennis Club. The fields were donated to the village in the 1950s and are maintained by the Parish Council. Wheatley Bowls Club have a dedicated facility a short distance away.

A number of sports clubs are active in the village. North Wheatley with Leverton Cricket Club was created by a merge of clubs from the two villages in 2004 and fields two teams in the Bassetlaw Saturday League. Wheatley Tennis Club provide social tennis and coaching and field two teams playing in the Gainsborough Evening Leagues. North Wheatley Phoenix Football Club also compete locally. Wheatley Bowls Club compete in local tournaments and have offered coaching days.

== Floods ==
North Wheatley has been flooded on several occasions - notably in 2007 and 2008. The 2007 floods caused considerable damage to the local primary school, which along with flood repairs to North Leverton school cost around £3 million to fix.

== See also ==
- Listed buildings in North and South Wheatley
