= Bassetlaw District =

District of Nottinghamshire, England

Coordinates: 53.40°N 0.95°W

- Non-metropolitan district
- Bassetlaw
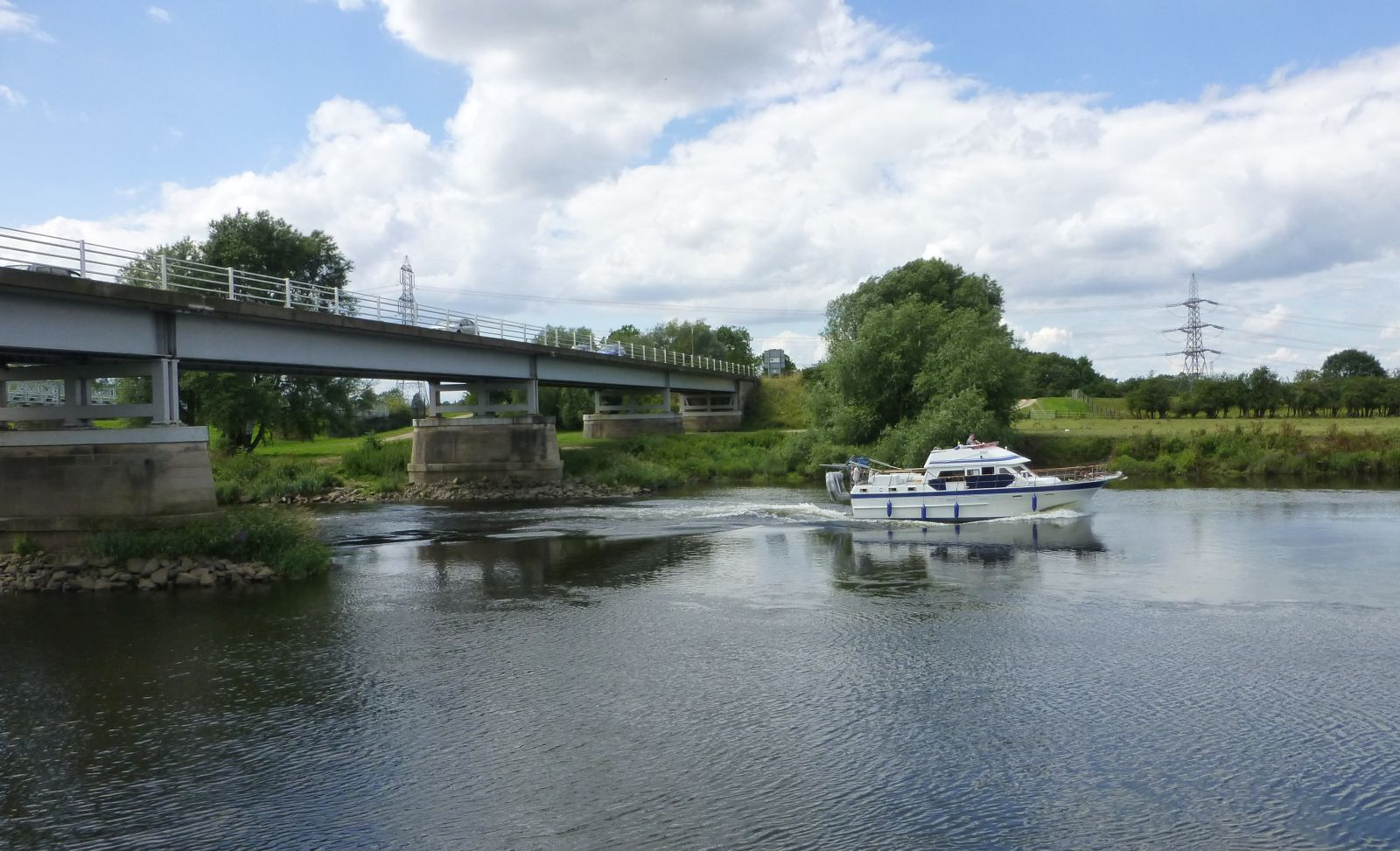
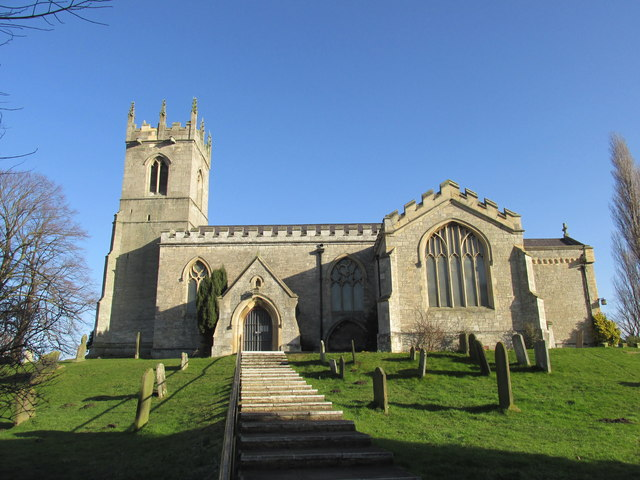
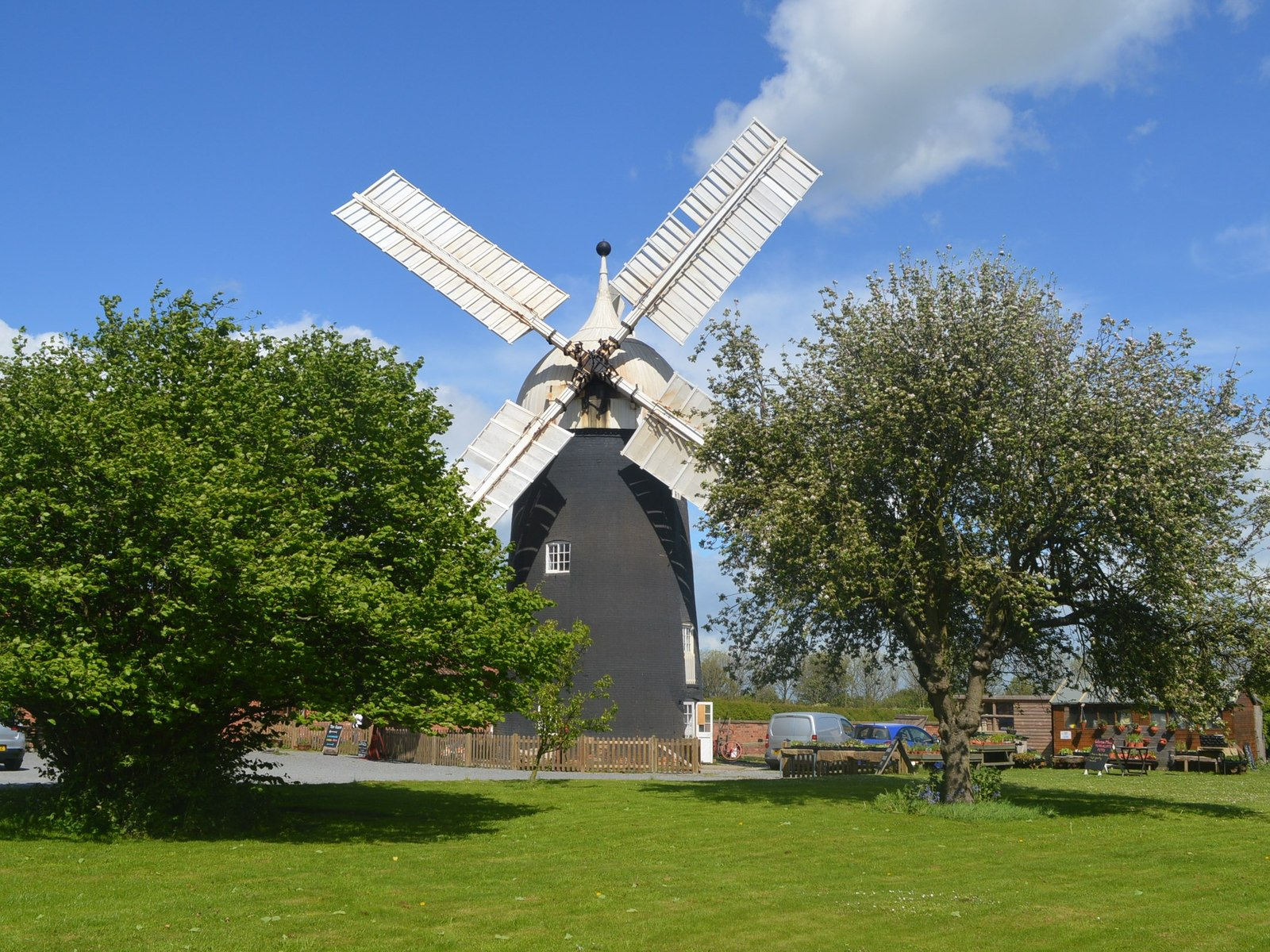
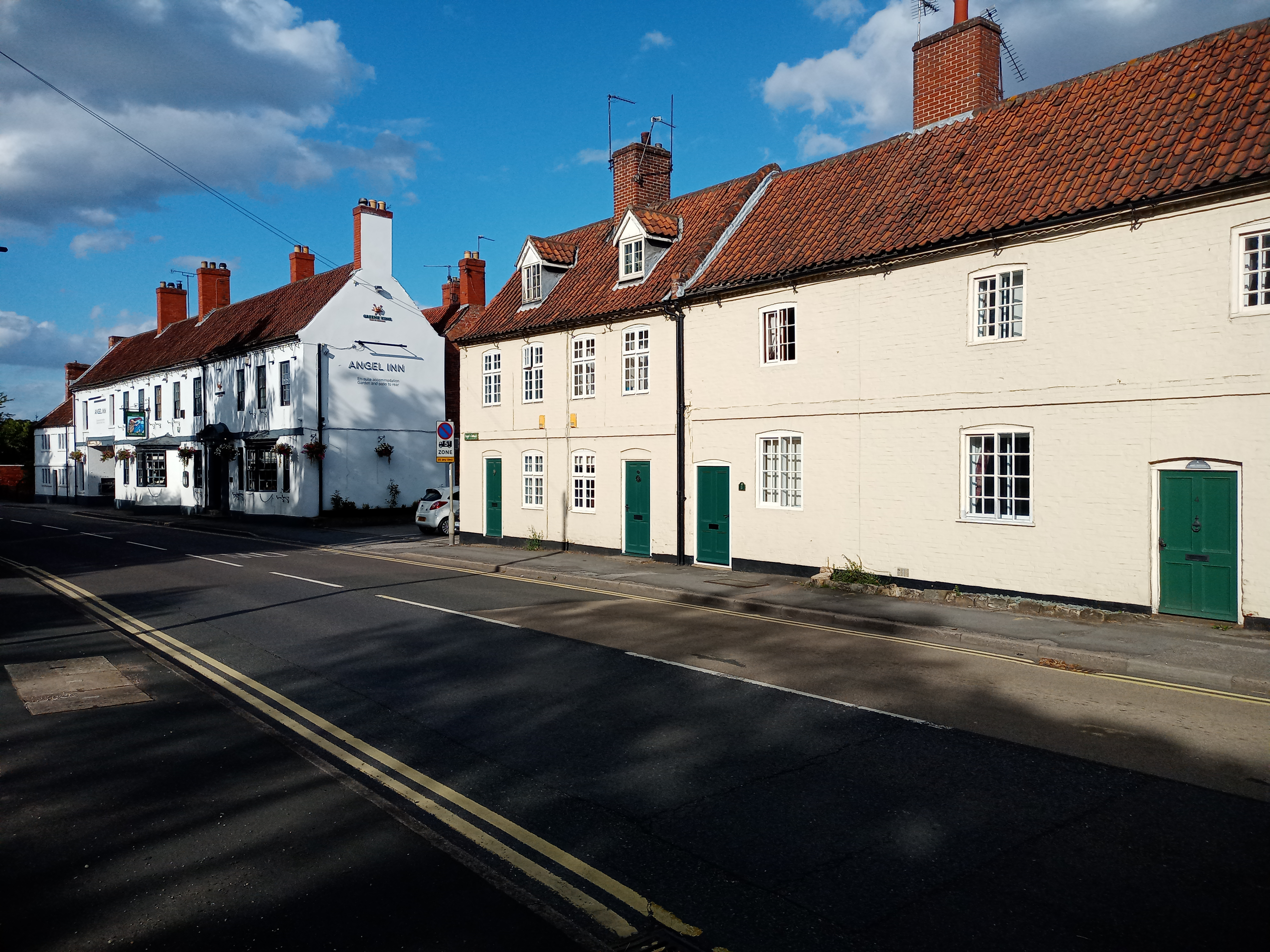
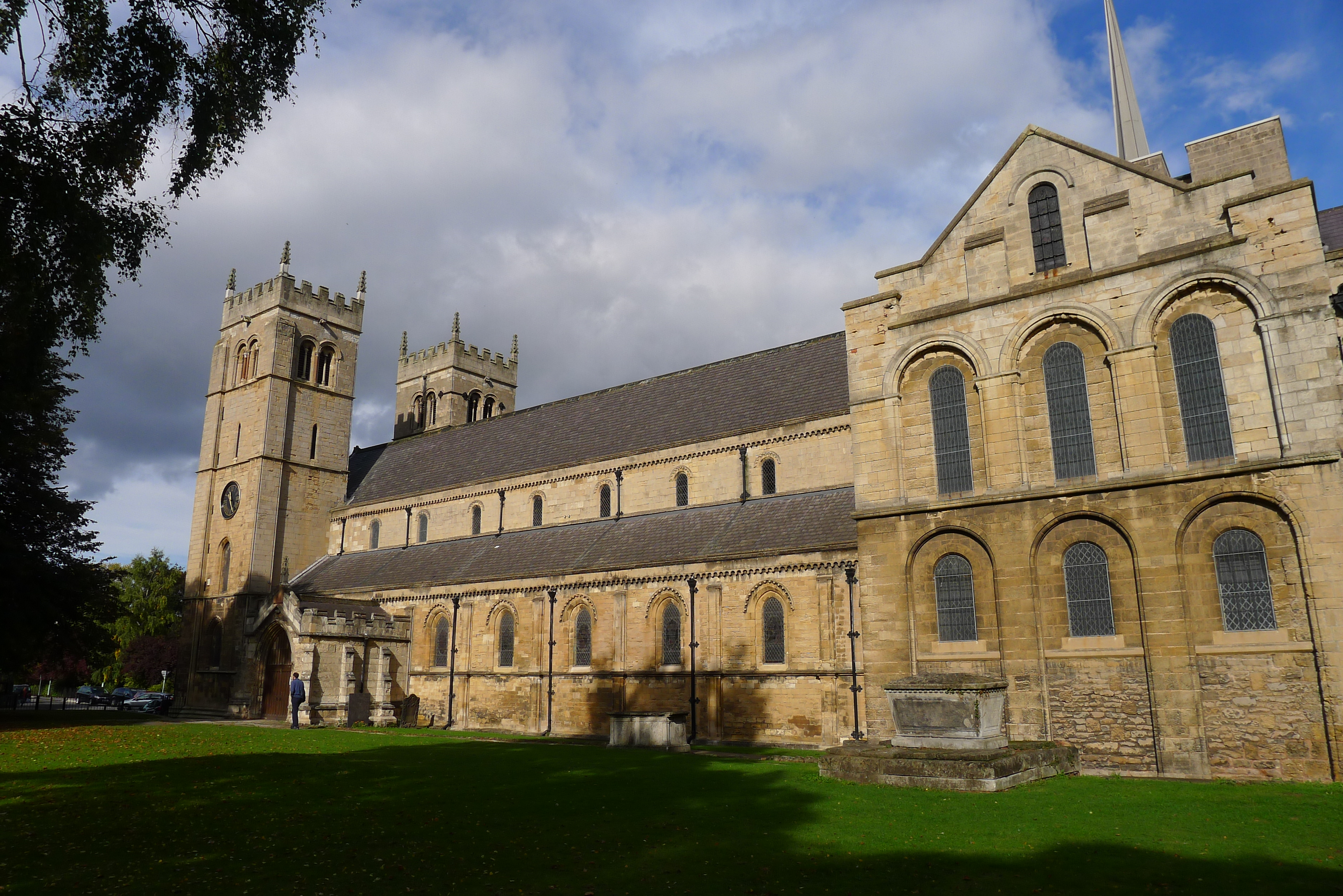
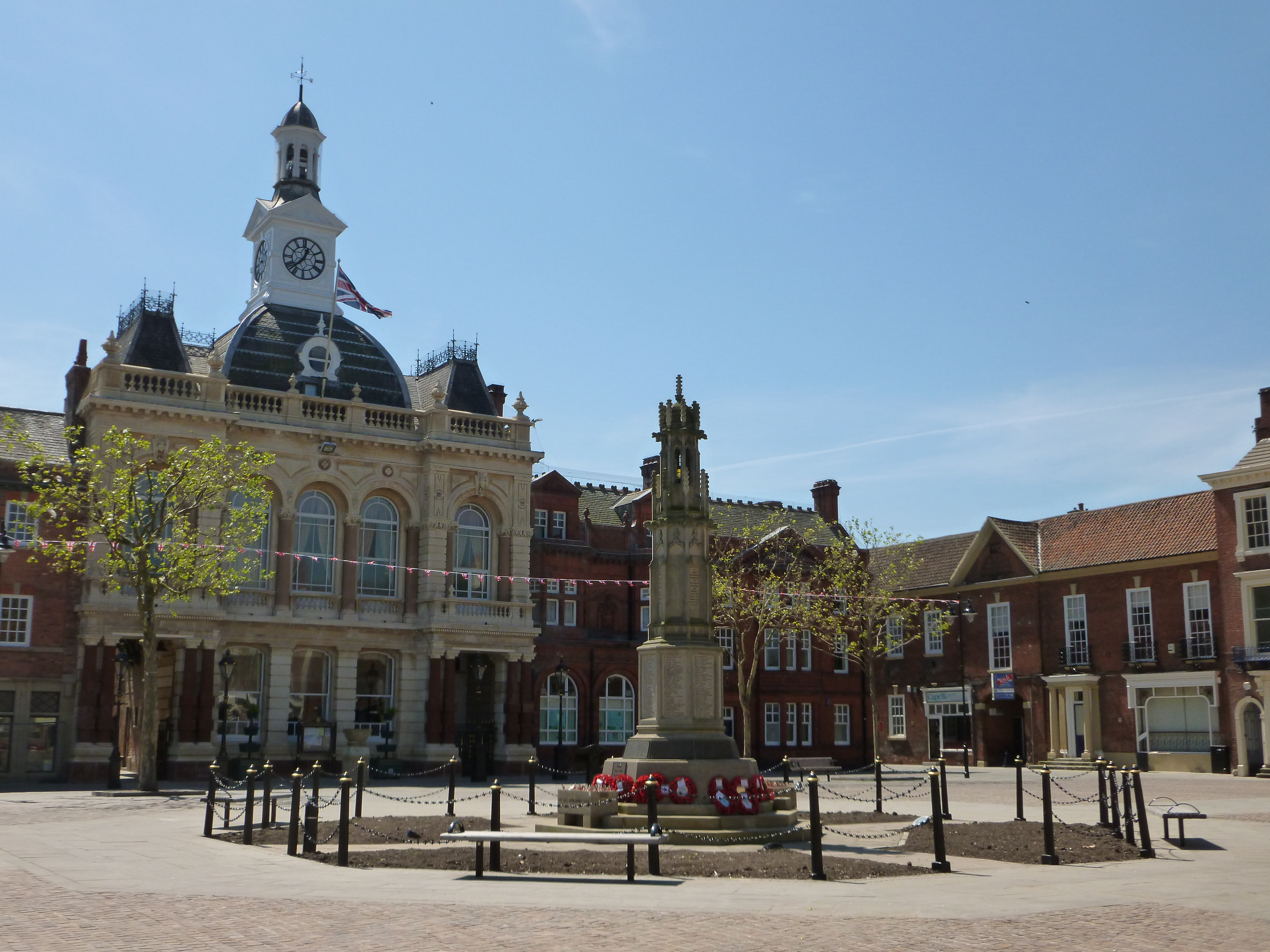
- From left to right: Top: The Dunham Bridge in Dunham on Trent connecting Lincolnshire and Nottinghamshire and also a toll bridge; Middle 1st: All Saints Church Harworth and Tuxford Windmill; Middle 2nd: Blyth and Worksop Priory church; Lower: Retford Town Hall

- Shown within Nottinghamshire
- Sovereign state: United Kingdom
- Constituent country: England
- Region: East Midlands
- Administrative county: Nottinghamshire
- Founded: 1 April 1974
- Admin. HQ: Worksop

Government
  - Type: Non-metropolitan district
  - Governing body: Bassetlaw District Council
  - MPs: Robert Jenrick, Jo White

Area
  - Total: 246 sq mi (638 km^{2})
  - Rank: 55th

Population (2025)
  - Total: 126,454
  - Rank: Ranked 195th
  - Density: 513/sq mi (198/km^{2})

Ethnicity (2021)
  - Ethnic groups: List: 96.4% White; 1.2% Asian; 1.2% Mixed; 0.6% Black; 0.6% other

Religion (2021)
  - Religion: List: 58.5% Christianity; 39.7% no religion; 1.1% other; 0.7% Islam
- Time zone: UTC+0 (Greenwich Mean Time)
  - Summer (DST): UTC+1 (British Summer Time)
- Postcode Areas: DN, NG, S

Bassetlaw is a local government district in north Nottinghamshire, England. Its council is based in the town of Worksop; the other towns in the district are Retford, Tuxford and Harworth Bircotes. The district also contains numerous villages and surrounding rural areas.

Bassetlaw is bounded to the south by the Newark and Sherwood and Mansfield districts, to the south-west by the Bolsover district of Derbyshire, to the north-west by the Metropolitan Borough of Rotherham and the City of Doncaster in South Yorkshire, to the north by North Lincolnshire, and to the east by West Lindsey.

Bassetlaw has been a non-constituent member of the East Midlands Combined County Authority since its estalishment in 2024. Simultaneously, the district maintains an indirect relationship as a non-constituent member of the South Yorkshire Mayoral Authority.

== History ==
The district was created on 1 April 1974 under the Local Government Act 1972, covering the whole of two former districts and most of another two, which were all abolished at the same time:

- East Retford Municipal Borough
- East Retford Rural District (except parish of Finningley, which went to Doncaster)
- Worksop Municipal Borough
- Worksop Rural District (except part of parish of Harworth, which went to Doncaster and was added to the parish of Bawtry)

The new district was named Bassetlaw after the medieval Bassetlaw Wapentake, which had covered a similar area. The council's logo now says "Bassetlaw District Council – North Nottinghamshire".

Under current local government reorganisation plans, all district councils in Nottinghamshire, as well as the county council, will be abolished in 2028, with the district becoming part of a new Nottinghamshire unitary authority.

== Governance ==
Bassetlaw District Council

Type
- Type: Non-metropolitan district

Leadership
- Chair: Sybil Fielding, Labour since 13 May 2026
- Leader: Julie Leigh, Labour since 25 July 2024
- Chief Executive: David Armiger since August 2021

Structure
- Seats: 48 councillors
- Graph of the party split among 48 seats.
- Political groups: Administration (33) Labour (33) Other parties (15) Reform (11) Conservative (3) Independent (1)

Elections
- Last election: 4 May 2023
- Next election: 6 May 2027

Meeting place
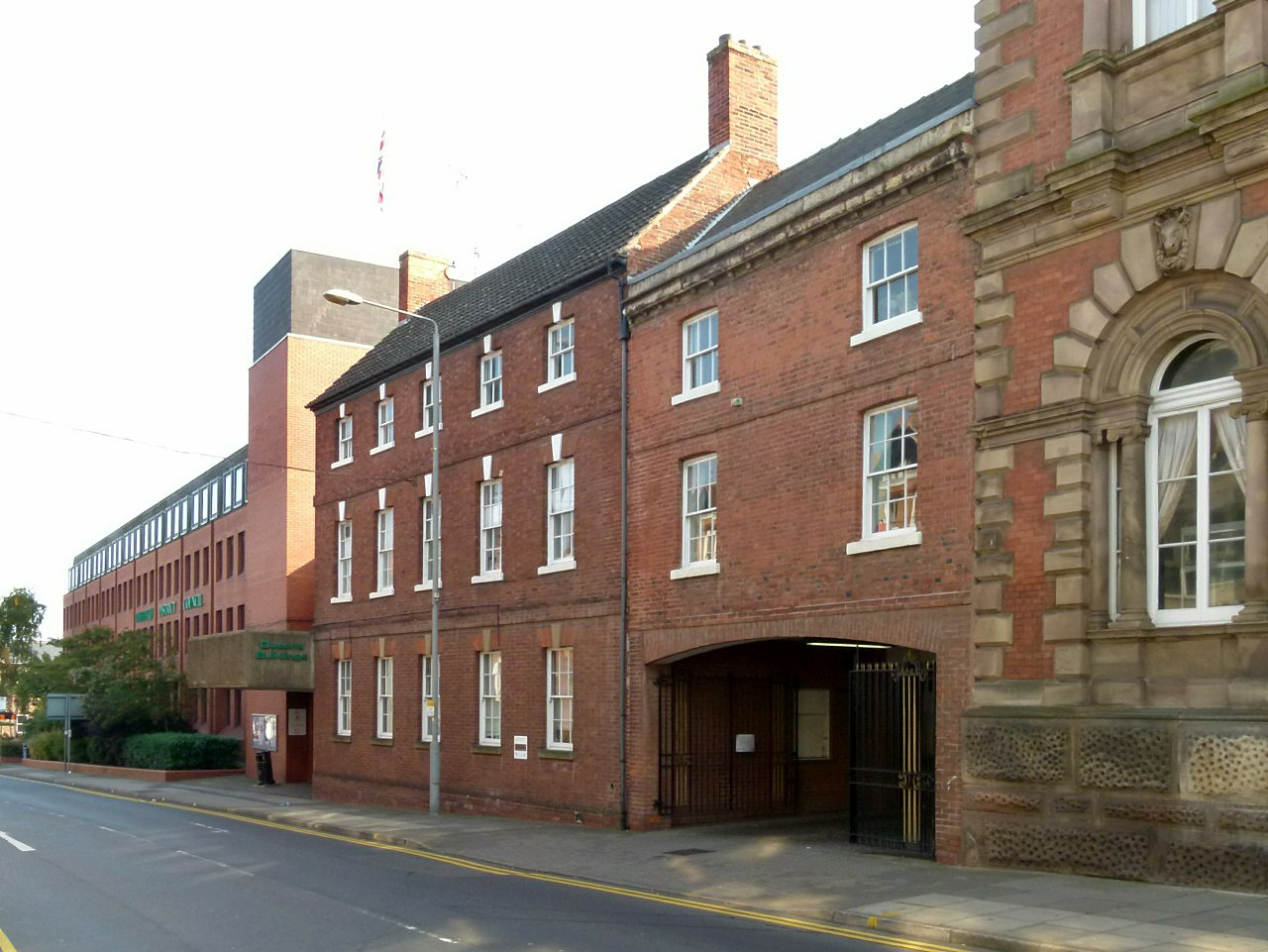
- Queen's Buildings, Potter Street, Worksop, S80 2AH

Website
- www.bassetlaw.gov.uk

Bassetlaw District Council provides district-level services. County-level services are provided by Nottinghamshire County Council. Much of the district is also covered by civil parishes, which form a third tier of local government.

=== Political control ===
The council has been under Labour majority control since 2011.

The first election to the council was held in 1973, initially operating as a shadow authority alongside the outgoing authorities before coming into its powers on 1 April 1974. Political control of the council since 1974 has been as follows:

Party in control	Years
Labour	1974–1976
No overall control	1976–1979
Labour	1979–2004
No overall control	2004–2006
Conservative	2006–2010
No overall control	2010–2011
Labour	2011–present

=== Leadership ===
The leaders of the council since 1981 have been:

Leader	Seat	Party	From	To
Reg Rabbitt	Worksop South East	Labour		May 1981
Les Russon	Carlton	Labour	1981	May 1986
Graham Oxby	Retford North	Labour	15 May 1996	2004
Mike Quigley	Retford East	Conservative	23 Jun 2004	2011
Graham Oxby	Retford North	Labour	2011	May 2012
Simon Greaves	Worksop North East	Labour	16 May 2012	22 Sep 2022
James Naish	Sturton	Labour	22 Sep 2022	25 July 2024
Julie Leigh	Worksop South	Labour	25 July 2024	

=== Composition ===
Following the 2023 election, and subsequent by-elections and changes of allegiance up to November 2026, the composition of the council was:

Party	Seats
Labour	33
Reform	11
Conservative	3
Independent	1
Total	48

The next election is due in 2027.

=== Elections ===
Since the last boundary changes in 2002 the council has comprised 48 councillors representing 25 wards, with each ward electing one, two or three councillors. Elections are held every four years.

Most of the district is within the Bassetlaw constituency. The south-east of the district, including Tuxford, is in the Newark constituency.

=== Premises ===
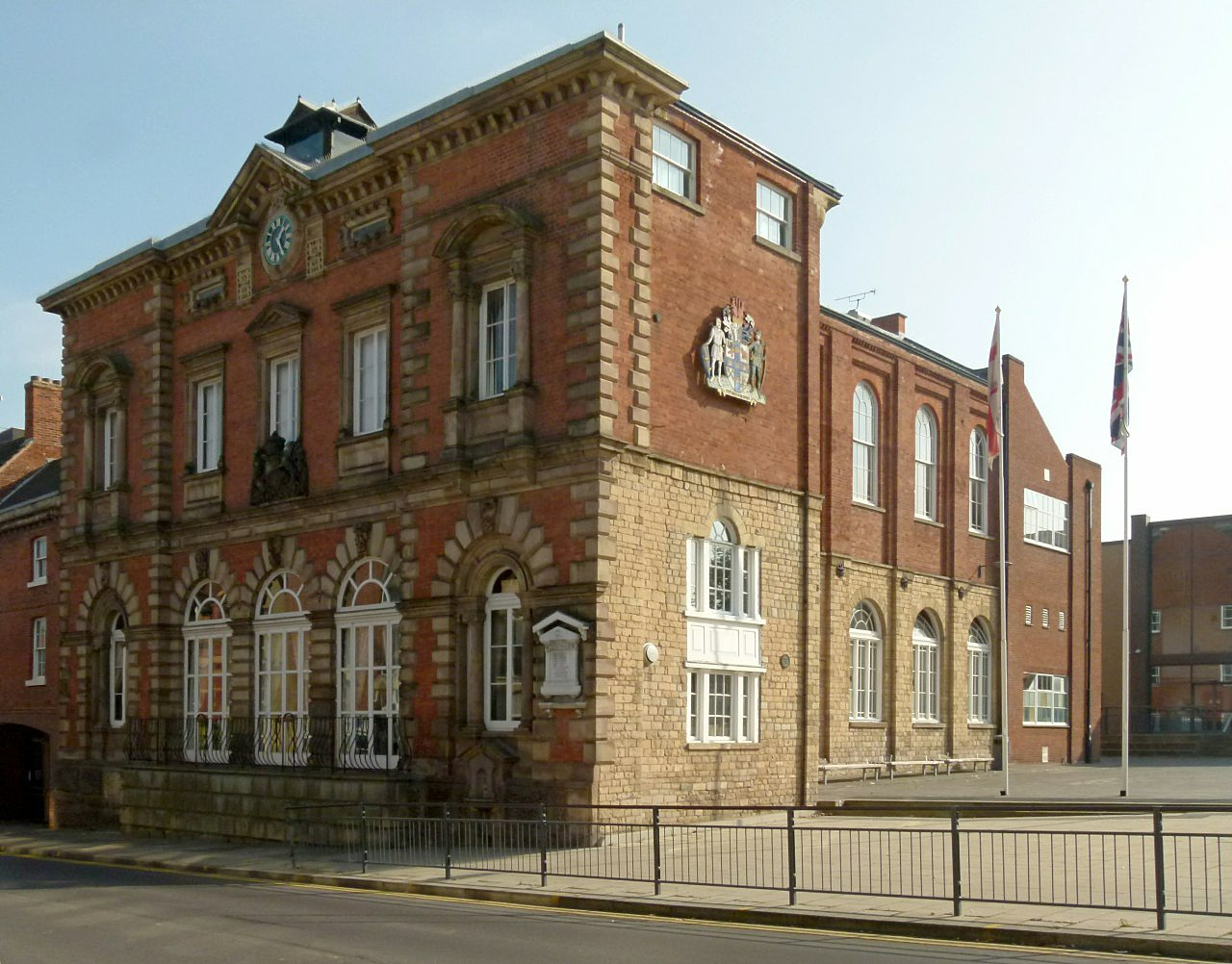
Worksop Town Hall

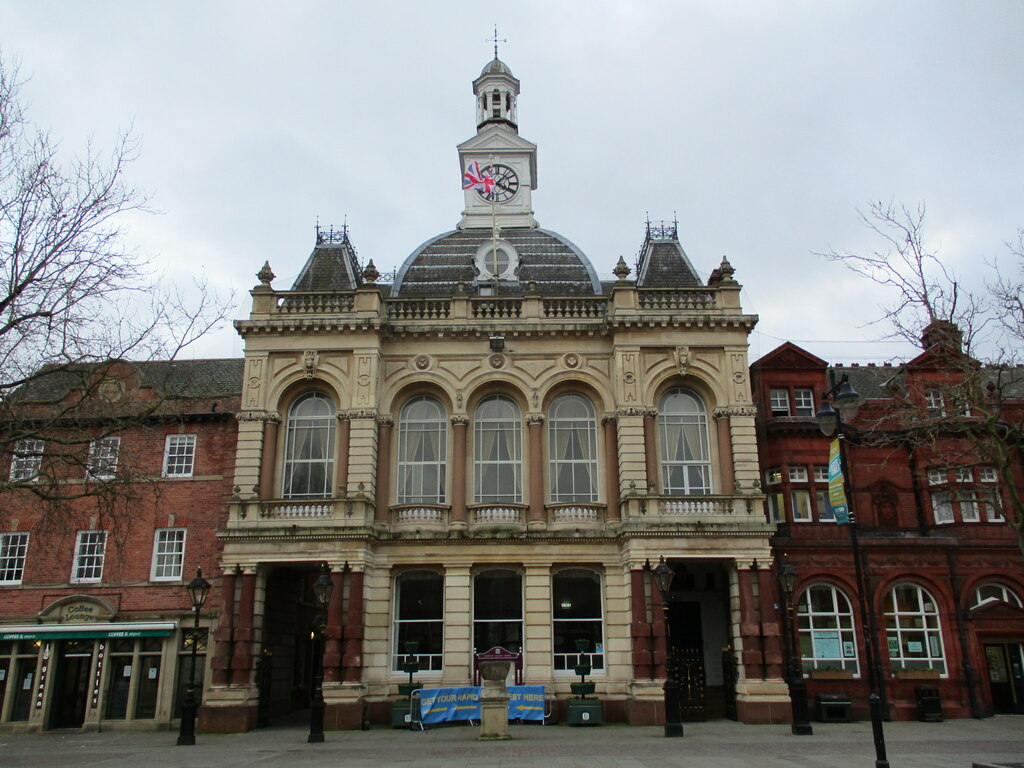
Retford Town Hall

Council meetings are held at both Worksop Town Hall, built in 1851, and Retford Town Hall, built in 1868, both of which the council inherited from its predecessor authorities. The council's main offices are at Queen's Buildings, completed in 1981 on Potter Street in Worksop, adjoining the Town Hall. The council also maintains an area office in Harworth.

== Settlements ==
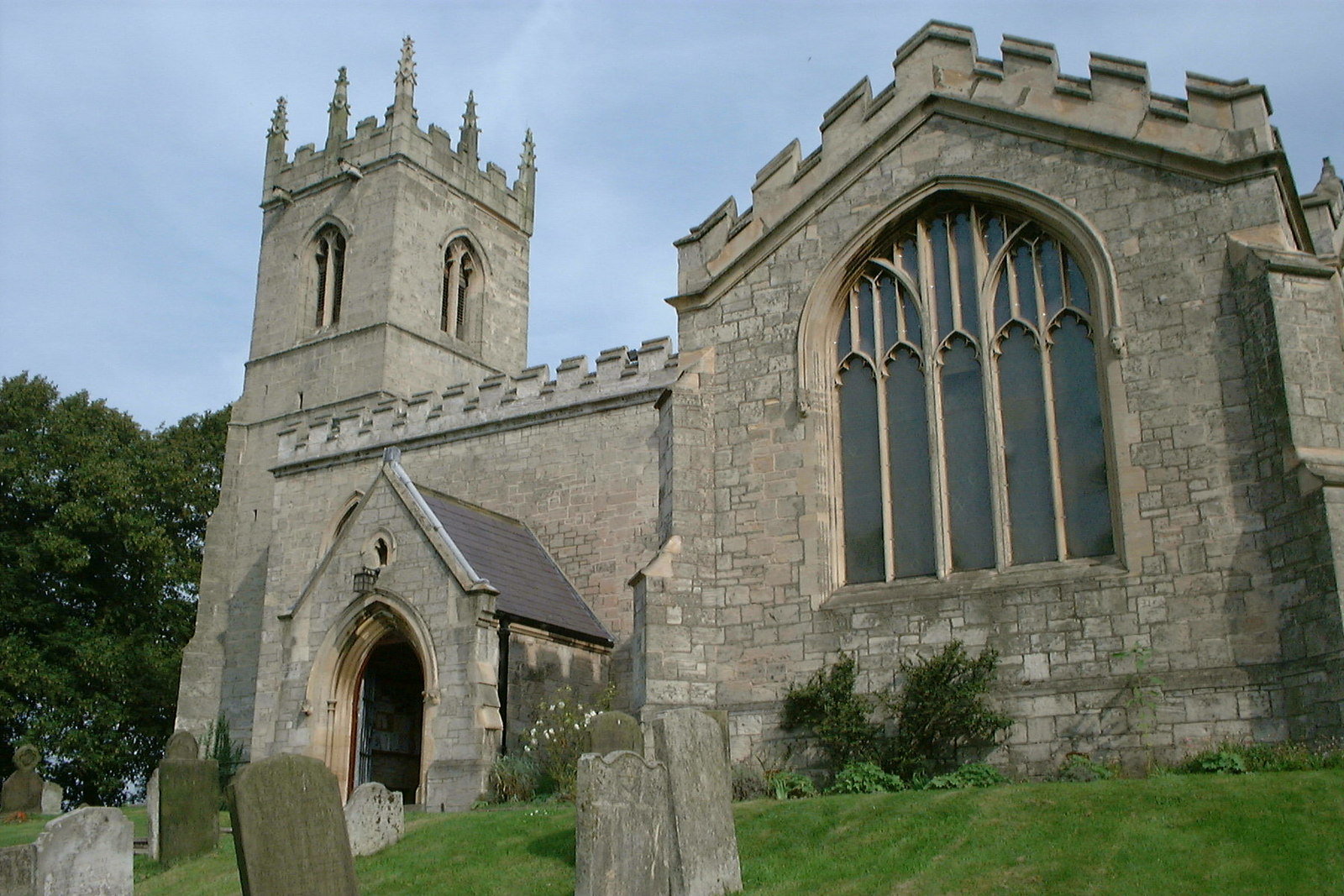
Harworth Bircotes, a civil parish with town status in Bassetlaw District

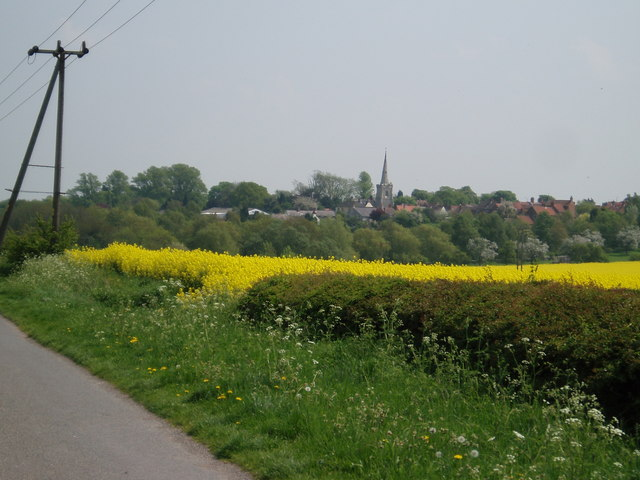
Tuxford, a historic market town in Bassetlaw District

Map of the district of Bassetlaw.

Bassetlaw is divided into 64 parishes, each governed by an elected parish council or parish meeting. The two main settlements of Retford and Worksop are the only areas of the district that are unparished, however, both towns are entitled to elect a town mayor via their respective charter trustees.

Name	Status	Image	Population (2011)	Ward(s)
Retford	Unparished (Charter trustees)	Retford Town Hall	22,023	Retford East; Retford North; Retford South; Retford West
Worksop	Unparished (Charter trustees)	Chesterfield Canal, Worksop	43,252	Worksop East; Worksop North; Worksop North East; Worksop North West; Worksop South; Worksop South East
Askham	Civil parish	St. Nicholas' Church, Askham	181	East Markham
Babworth	Civil parish	Chesterfield Canal, Babworth	1,687	Sutton
Barnby Moor	Civil parish	Ye Olde Bell, Barnby Moor	278	Sutton
Beckingham	Civil parish	All Saints' Church, Beckingham	1,098	Beckingham
Bevercotes	Civil parish	Farm buildings in Bevercotes	Unknown	East Markham
Blyth	Civil parish	St Mary and St Martin's Church, Blyth	1,233	Blyth
Bole	Civil parish	St Martin's Church, Bole	247	Sturton
Bothamsall	Civil parish	Lound Hall, Bothamsall	270	East Markham
Carburton	Civil parish	Ollerton Road Bridge, Carburton	Unknown	Welbeck
Carlton in Lindrick	Civil parish	St. John's Church, Carlton in Lindrick	5,623	Carlton
Clarborough and Welham	Civil parish	Public house in Clarborough	1,088	Clayworth
Clayworth	Civil parish	St Peter's Church, Clayworth	419	Clayworth
Clumber and Hardwick	Civil parish	Clumber Park	Unknown	Welbeck
Cottam	Civil parish	Cottages in Cottam	108	Rampton
Darlton	Civil parish	St. Giles Church, Darlton	110	Tuxford and Trent
Dunham-on-Trent	Civil parish	St. Oswald's Church, Dunham-on-Trent	343	Tuxford and Trent
East Drayton	Civil parish	St. Peter's Church, East Drayton	252	Tuxford and Trent
East Markham	Civil parish	St. John the Baptist Church	1,160	East Markham
Eaton	Civil parish	Eaton	233	East Markham
Elkesley	Civil parish	St. Giles Church, Elkesley	822	Welbeck
Everton	Civil parish	Holy Trinity Church, Everton	839	Everton
Fledborough	Civil parish	St Gregory's Church, Fledborough	Unknown	Tuxford and Trent
Gamston	Civil parish	St Peter's Church, Gamston	246	East Markham
Gringley on the Hill	Civil parish	St Peter & St Paul's Church	699	Everton
Grove	Civil parish	View towards Grove	105	Rampton
Harworth Bircotes	Civil parish	All Saints Church, Harworth	7,948	Harworth
Haughton	Civil parish	Haughton watermill	Unknown	East Markham
Hayton	Civil parish	St. Peter's Church, Hayton	385	Clayworth
Headon cum Upton	Civil parish	St. Peter's Church, Headon	253	Rampton
Hodsock	Civil parish	Hodsock Priory	2,472	Langold
Laneham	Civil parish	Signpost in Laneham	312	Tuxford and Trent
Lound	Civil parish	Lound	471	Sutton
Marnham	Civil parish	St. Wilfrid's Church, Marnham	117	Tuxford and Trent
Mattersey	Civil parish	All Saints' Church, Mattersey	792	Ranskill
Misson	Civil parish	St. John the Baptist Church, Misson	745	Everton
Misterton	Civil parish	All Saints' Church, Misterton	2,140	Misterton
Nether Langwith	Civil parish	Public house in Nether Langwith	526	Welbeck
Normanton on Trent	Civil parish	St. Matthew's Church	345	Tuxford and Trent
North and South Wheatley	Civil parish	Church of St. Peter and St. Paul's	509	Sturton
North Leverton with Habblesthorpe	Civil parish	North Leverton Windmill	1,047	Sturton
Norton, Cuckney, Holbeck and Welbeck	Civil parish	Welbeck Abbey	550	Welbeck
Ragnall	Civil parish	St.Leonard's Church, Ragnall	Unknown	Tuxford and Trent
Rampton and Woodbeck	Civil parish	All Saints' Church, Rampton	1,139	Rampton
Ranskill	Civil parish	Church of St Barnabas, Ranskill	1,362	Rampton
Rhodesia	Civil parish	Chesterfield Canal, Rhodesia	982	Worksop North West
Saundby	Civil parish	Church of St Martin of Tours	165	Worksop North West
Scaftworth	Civil parish	Public house in Scaftworth	Unknown	Everton
Scrooby	Civil parish	St. Wilfrid's Church, Scrooby	315	Blyth
Shireoaks	Civil parish	Shireoaks Hall	1,432	Worksop North West
South Leverton	Civil parish	All Saints' Church, South Leverton	480	Rampton
Stokeham	Civil parish	St. Peter's Church, Stokeham	Unknown	Rampton
Sturton le Steeple	Civil parish	Sturton le Steeple	486	Sturton
Styrrup with Oldcotes	Civil parish	St. Helen's Church, Oldcotes	684	Blyth
Sutton	Civil parish	St. Bartholomew's Church	673	Sutton
Torworth	Civil parish	Great North Road, Torworth	263	Ranskill
Treswell	Civil parish	St. John the Baptist Church, Treswell	211	Rampton
Tuxford	Civil parish	Tuxford High Street	2,649	Tuxford and Trent
Walkeringham	Civil parish	St. Mary Magdalene Church, Walkeringham	1,022	Beckingham
Wallingwells	Civil parish	Wallingwells Hall	22	Carlton
West Burton	Civil parish	West Burton power stations	Unknown	Sturton
West Drayton	Civil parish	West Drayton	225	East Markham
West Markham	Civil parish	All Saints' Church, West Markham	170	East Markham
West Stockwith	Civil parish	West Stockwith lock	327	Misterton
Wiseton	Civil parish	Cottages in Wiseton	Unknown	Clayworth

== Wards ==
Bassetlaw is divided into 25 wards for electoral purposes. Each ward returns either one, two or three councillors at each election depending upon the number of electors within each ward.

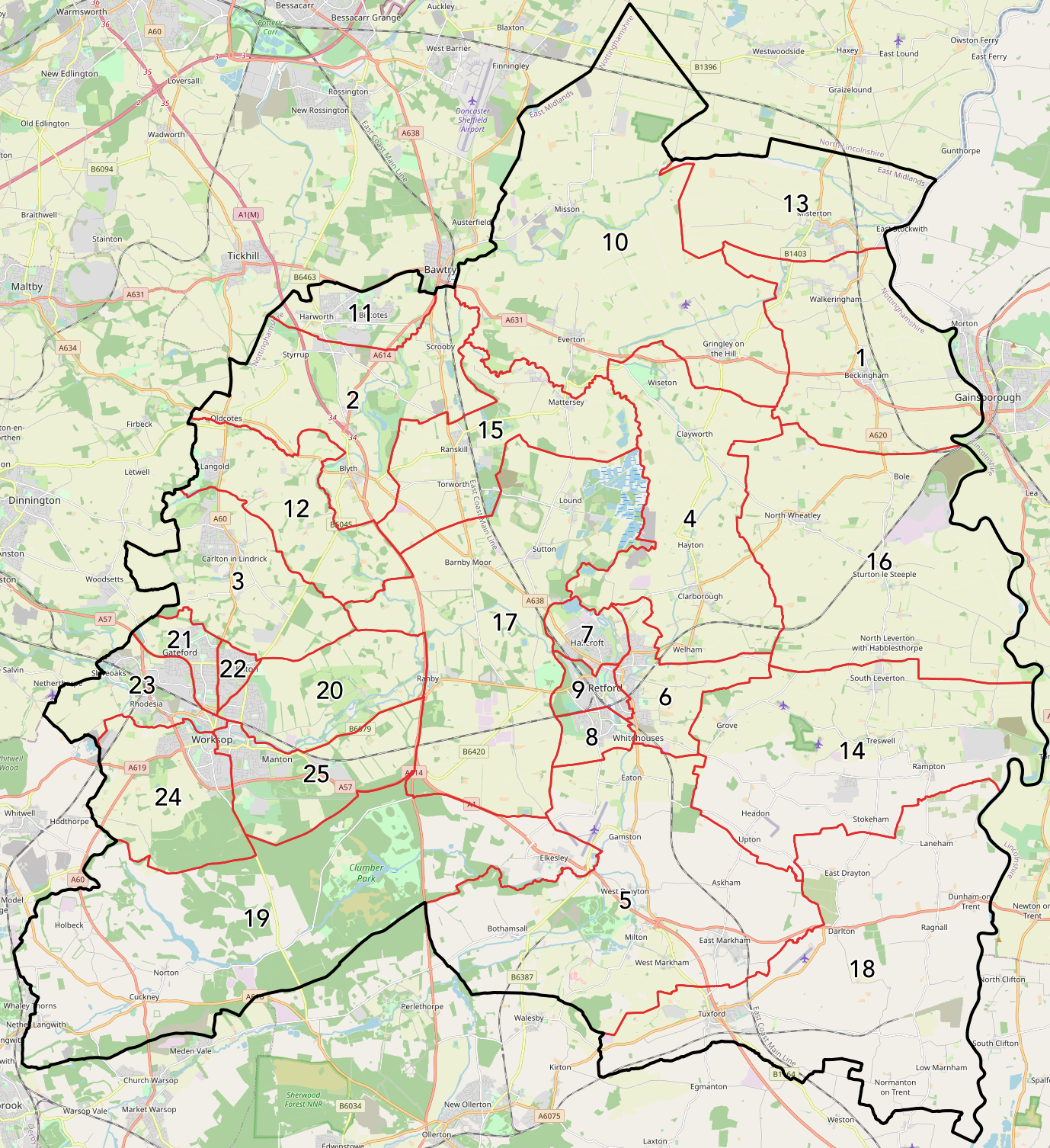
1. Beckingham; 2. Blyth; 3. Carlton; 4. Clayworth; 5. East Markham; 6. East Retford East; 7. East Retford North; 8. East Retford South; 9. East Retford West; 10. Everton; 11. Harworth; 12. Langold; 13. Misterton	14. Rampton; 15. Ranskill; 16. Sturton; 17. Sutton; 18. Tuxford and Trent; 19. Welbeck; 20. Worksop East; 21. Worksop North; 22. Worksop North East; 23. Worksop North West; 24. Worksop South; 25. Worksop South East

== Demography ==
=== Population ===
Population of Bassetlaw (1811–2011)
Year	Population	Year	Population	Year	Population
1811	25,813	1881	43,735	1951	101,590
1821	30,148	1891	45,203	1961	99,221
1831	32,950	1901	50,796	1971	96,918
1841	34,961	1911	57,084	1981	101,119
1851	37,180	1921	63,854	1991	105,354
1861	39,365	1931	71,427	2001	107,701
				2011	112,863
Pre-1974 statistics were gathered from local government areas that now comprise Bassetlaw. Source: Great Britain Historical GIS.

=== Religion ===
Religion	Percent
Christian	81.53%
Buddhist	0.09%
Hindu	0.13%
Jewish	0.05%
Muslim	0.33%
Sikh	0.07%
No religion	9.99%

== Media ==
Bassetlaw receives better TV signals from the Emley Moor transmitter rather than Waltham transmitter which means the area is served by BBC Yorkshire and ITV Yorkshire, both broadcast from Leeds.

Radio stations that broadcast to the area are BBC Radio Sheffield, Greatest Hits Radio South Yorkshire, Hits Radio South Yorkshire, Doncaster Radio and Trust AM, an online hospital radio station serving the Bassetlaw District General Hospital in Worksop.

Bassetlaw's local newspapers are Worksop Guardian and Retford Times.

== Town twinning ==
- (United States) Farmers Branch, Texas, USA
- Garbsen, Germany
- Pfungstadt, Germany
- Aurillac, France
