= Clarborough and Welham =

Civil parish in Nottinghamshire, England

Coordinates: 53.334°N 0.908°W

- Civil parish
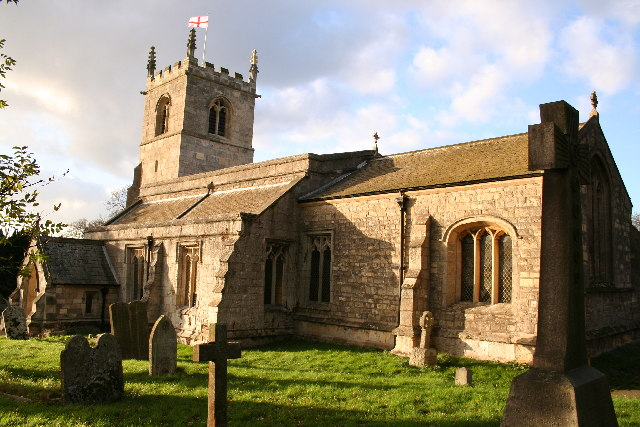
- St. John the Baptist's church, Clarborough

- Location within Nottinghamshire
- Interactive map of Clarborough and Welham
- Area: 3.47 sq mi (9.0 km^{2})
- Population: 1,041 (2021)
  - Density: 300/sq mi (120/km^{2})
- OS grid reference: SK 729827
  - London: 130 mi (210 km) S
- District: Bassetlaw
- Shire county: Nottinghamshire
- Region: East Midlands
- Country: England
- Sovereign state: United Kingdom
- Settlements: Clarborough and Welham
- Post town: RETFORD
- Postcode district: DN22
- Dialling code: 01777
- Police: Nottinghamshire
- Fire: Nottinghamshire
- Ambulance: East Midlands
- UK Parliament: Bassetlaw
- Website: clarboroughandwelhamparishcouncil.gov.uk

Clarborough and Welham is a civil parish in the Bassetlaw district, in the county of Nottinghamshire, England. The parish includes the village of Clarborough and the hamlet of Welham. In 2021 the parish had a population of 1,041. It is 130 miles north of London, 28 miles north east of the city of Nottingham, and 2 miles north east of the market town of Retford. The parish touches Hayton, North and South Wheatley, North Leverton with Habblesthorpe and Sturton Le Steeple. There are 14 listed buildings in Clarborough and Welham.

== Geography ==
=== Location ===
Clarborough and Welham is surrounded by the following local areas:

- Hayton to the north
- Little Gringley to the south
- Christone, North Leverton, South Leverton, South Wheatley, Sturton Le Steeple and Westholme to the east
- Bolham, Retford and Tiln to the west.

=== Settlements ===
The two settlements within the parish are:

- Clarborough
- Welham

==== Clarborough ====
The larger village of the two areas, it is a linear settlement along the A620 Retford to Beckingham road. It lies along the north boundary of the parish, and its urban area merges into the village and parish of Hayton. It maintains key amenities such as post office, church, village hall, and shop.

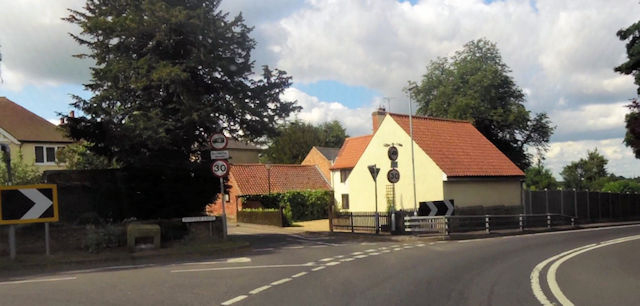
Welham centre

==== Welham ====
This is 1 mile (1.6 km) south of Clarborough, separated by greenfield land, Primarily residential, it too is a linear village along the A620, lying to the south west of the parish. It which gets its name from a once celebrated spring (St Johns Well) near the place, which was formed into a large bath. The spring is still located in a private house. Welham is listed in Domesday as "Wellun" (meaning 'at the spring'). Welham Grange, an intact house dating from 1667 which listed as a Grade II building by the English Heritage on 1 February 1967. Also in Welham is the early 19th-century Welham Hall.

Welham Bridge, although spanning the canal along the A620 road close to the village, is outside the boundary. It was formerly within the larger Clarborough parish.

=== Landscape ===
==== Woods ====
Primarily farmland throughout the parish outside the villages, there is some small forestry east of Welham:

- Clarborough Nature Reserve alongside the railway line.
- Caddow's Wood and Hutchinson's Holt are wooded areas in the far south east.

==== Water features ====
The Chesterfield Canal runs from the south west to the north of the parish, west of the two villages.

The Guns Beck stream forms part of the western parish boundary, before feeding into the canal.

==== Land elevation ====
At its western extremity, the land level is low-lying and flat, varying little between 10–15 metres (33–49 ft).

The villages rise to around 20–25 metres (66–82 ft).

To the east of the parish it is more hilly, in the north east by Clarborough Hill there is an elevation of 50–65 metres (164–213 ft).

In the south east the parish peak is near Schrog Hill of 90 metres (300 ft).

== History ==
=== Clarborough ===
Clarborough was mentioned in the Domesday Book as Claueburch or Claureburg, and later Clareborough. It has primarily been an agricultural settlement for hundreds of years. It nestles in the flat plains before the land rises up to Clarborough Hill where a windmill stood in 1753 (which burnt down in 1896).

St John the Baptist Church is located to the east of the village and was built in the 13th century although it is likely that a church was on the site before this time. Beside the church is the Victorian School House which was built in 1870s, and the Old Vicarage.

The Chesterfield Canal in 1777 was opened to transport minerals and iron from Derbyshire to the River Trent. This enters the parish from the south west and exits to the northwest. A number of locks and bridges intersect this throughout.

In the 18th century there were workhouses in Clarborough.

Until the late 1800s Clarborough was a larger parish, taking in additional areas to the west and south such as Bolham, Little Gringley, and the Spital Hill and Moorgate portions of the Retford area. The chapel of ease of St Saviour's in Retford was built in 1827–9 to accommodate worshippers in those distant parts of Clarborough nearest to Retford to attend services as it would be nearer than St John's, and they were regularly instead using St Swithun's Church in central Retford. A major benefactor of the new church was Henry Clark Hutchinson of Welham Hall, providing some of the money to purchase the advowson of Clarborough, and gave a sum towards the building work. He also provided the land on which the chapel was built, and the land nearby on which the vicarage, and afterwards a school, were constructed.

By the turn of the 20th century Francis John Savile Foljambe of Osberton Hall, was a notable landowner and Lord of the manor. Clarborough Hall was the seat of John Henry Hutchinson, and was erected in 1863–4. Other key residents by this time included C. E. de More Thorold of Welham Manor (son of Charles Thorold Wood), with Henry Denison of Eaton Hall, Arthur Robert Garland of Welham Hall and S. W. S. Taylor having substantial landholdings.

On 31 December 1894 the civil parish of North Retford which held Bolham, Little Gringley, Spital Hill and Moorgate was split from Clarborough to encompass the area for St. Saviour's, and in 1921 it was further merged into East Retford. The remaining area continued to be called Clarborough until 1 December 2006.

Since 1945 Clarborough and Welham have increasingly become residential settlements rather than solely agricultural villages. There was an influx of workers into the area in the late 1950s when the Cottam and West Burton power stations were built. The demand for housing changed the size and structure of Clarborough, much of the building taking place to the west of the A620. Two new estates between Big Lane and Smeath Lane were built in the 1960s and the early 1970s.

New development in the 20th century has moved the village balance to the north and west, away from the traditional centre by the church.

The village has occasional impact from flooding. The floods of 2007 had a notable impact in Clarborough, with water from higher land east of the village causing some damage to a number of houses. Main Street was particularly affected, with Church Lane, Big Lane and Little Lane also seeing issues. It also caused the closure of the A620 for over 12 hours due to flood water accumulating in the dip of the road surface under the low bridge between Clarborough and Welham.

=== Welham ===
This was also reported in the Domesday Book, as Wellun (at the spring). It is so named due to a well located at a house on Bone Mill Lane.

The wider Nottinghamshire region was a heartland for the Puritans. One of the Mayflower pilgrims, Edward Southworth was born in the village. Southworth was due to join the voyage to the Americas but eventually only realised the first portion of the overall journey via England, possibly due to ill health, so returning to Holland and dying there in 1621. His spouse Alice Carpenter eventually went to America, remarrying another English settler who became governor of the Plymouth Colony settlement, William Bradford.

In the early 1700s it was considered the waters had medicinal properties and a spa was built by John Henry Hutchinson of Clarborough Hall. It lost its popularity with the advent of the railways (which allowed travel by locals to other warmer spas).

By the turn of the 20th century Francis John Savile Foljambe of Osberton Hall, was a notable landowner and Lord of the manor. Other key locals by this time included C. E. de More Thorold of Welham Manor (son of Charles Thorold Wood), with Arthur Robert Garland of Welham Hall also having substantial landholdings.

The oldest part of the village is by a sharp corner on the A620 road. Given its small size Welham has a number of listed buildings, 17th century Welham Grange, Welham Park House and Welham Hall (two manor houses dating from the early 19th century). Whinleys Farmhouse situated at one of the high points is also a listed building.

== Governance and demography ==
=== Council administration ===
The settlements Clarborough and Welham are combined as one parish for administrative identity.

It is managed at the first level of public administration by Clarborough and Welham Parish Council.

At district level, the wider area is managed by Bassetlaw District Council.

Nottinghamshire County Council provides the highest level strategic services locally.

=== Occupations ===
During the period of the late 19th century, the 1881 Census provided information on the occupation classification of the inhabitants of Clarborough. This data helps to give an insight of the history of the area. The central field of employment for males during this era was in agriculture, with 667 males working within this field. Although a great number (145) were employed within the field entitled 'Wrks in Var. Mineral Substances', this could be explained through the location of Clarborough being in the Midlands, and during this time miners were in great demand, due to the volume of demand. The number of males employed within the 'professionals' field was significantly lower, standing at only 28.

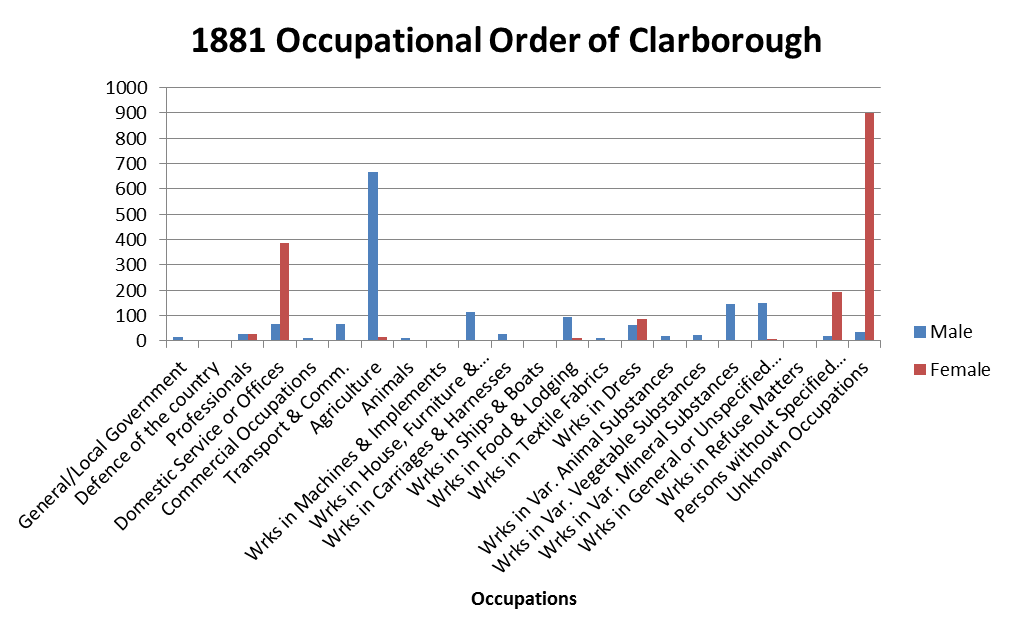
1881 occupational order graph of Clarborough

The 1881 Census also provided information on the female occupations, with the majority (889) being categorised with an 'Unknown Occupation'. This may be seen as stereotypical for this era as it would primarily be the males in the family who earned the living. Nevertheless, this data also provides evidence stating that 385 females worked within the 'Domestic Services or Offices' grouping. Although, this is quite a minor percentage of the population of the population at this time as the 1881 Census states the population of Clarborough to be 6,290.

The village of Clarborough may have been classified with a lower class status due to the occupations found, with the vast majority of the village working in a primary field, rather than tertiary such as the level of 'Professionals' found was significantly lower compared to those working in 'Agriculture'.

As transport links improved and personal transport became the norm, Clarborough developed through the latter part of the 20th century with major employment opportunities developing at local power stations as well as public sector employers such as education, police and prison service. Improvements to the railway network, particularly the East Coast Main Line through Retford that links Edinburgh and Leeds with London, also increased property prices as commuting became more feasible.

=== Population ===
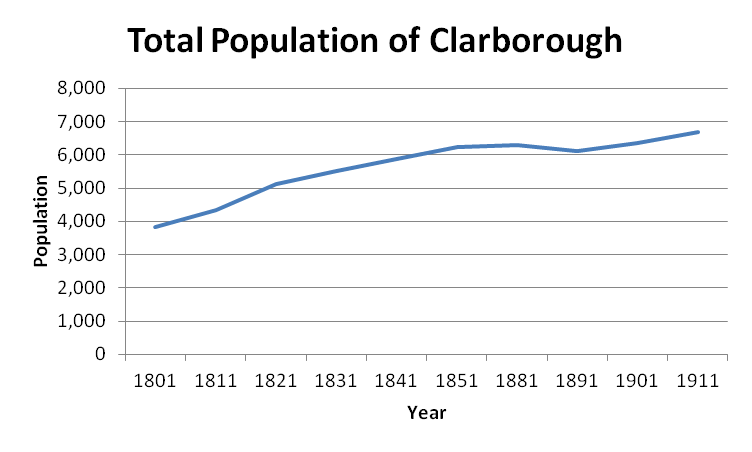
Total population change of Clarborough between 1801 and 1911

Population change in Clarborough has followed a similar trajectory to that of England as a whole, although there has been a greater amount of fluctuation. One reason for this is that Clarborough has a smaller population, therefore any change would be more recognisable. In 1881 there was a national decline in population change with England overall declining by 3%, whereas Clarborough declined overall by 6%, reaching its lowest rate of change being −3%. Since this period the population has peaked higher than the original rate to 6% in 1901, and has remained steadily in parallel with the rest of England and Wales.

The population density for England and Wales has remained at a steady rate. Although, there is a clear positive correlation, as in 1881 the national rate of population density was 0.7%, however it has increased slightly to 0.95% in 1901. Whereas, the population density in Clarborough has remained at a steady rate of 0.25% from 1881 to 1901.

The civil parish of Clarborough and Welham had a population of 1,111 in the 2001 census, reporting a small population decrease to 1,088 residents in 2011, and a further fall to 1,041 in 2021.

=== Real estate ===
According to the 2001 Census, Clarborough had 481 dwellings, 290 of these dwellings are in the detached housing category, with 186 being semi-detached and terraced houses and 5 being categorised as flat maisonettes or apartments. The average property price in Clarborough is £230,292, whereas the national average is £161,588.

== Community & leisure ==
A village hall is in Clarborough village.

There is one public house in Clarborough.

=== Chesterfield Canal ===
The canal runs to the west of the villages, from the south west to the north of the parish. A long-distance walking path called the Cuckoo Way runs alongside, reusing its towpath. The whole of the canal is designated as a Site of Special Scientific Interest (SSSI).

=== Clarborough Nature Reserve ===
This is atop the railway line and surrounding area. It is a limestone grassland and scrub woodland covering 5 hectares. It too is registered as an SSSI, and run by the Nottinghamshire Wildlife Trust.

== Education ==
There is a school, Clarborough Primary.

== Landmarks ==
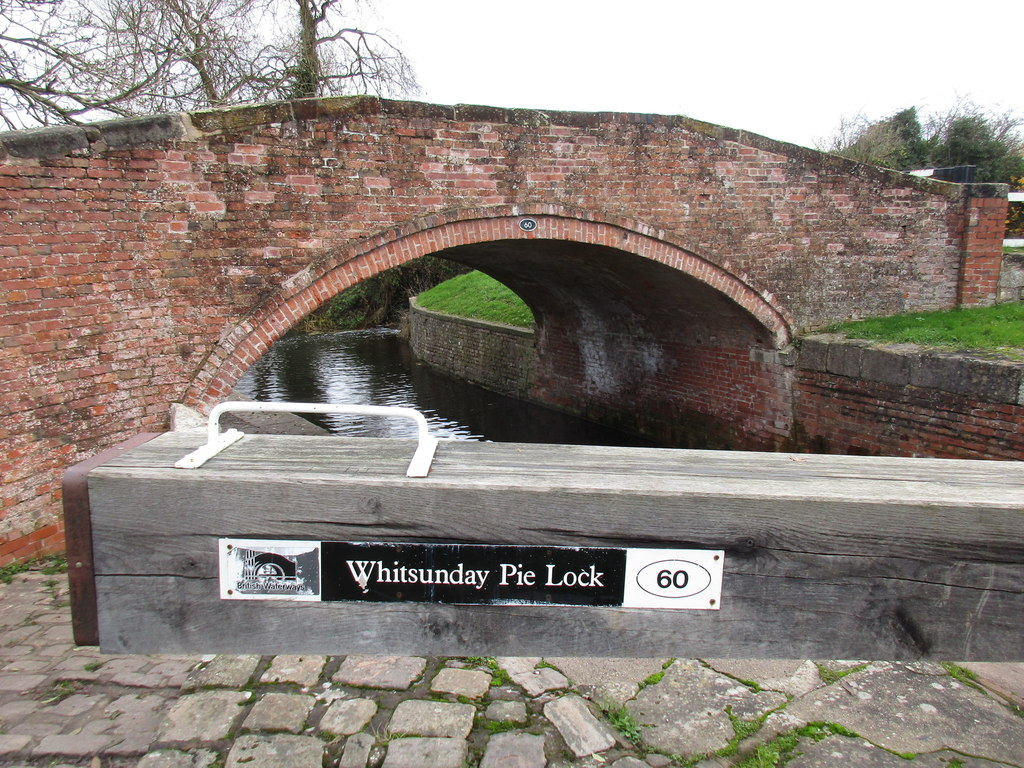
Whitsunday Pie Bridge 60 at Whitsunday Pie Lock over Chesterfield Canal, Welham

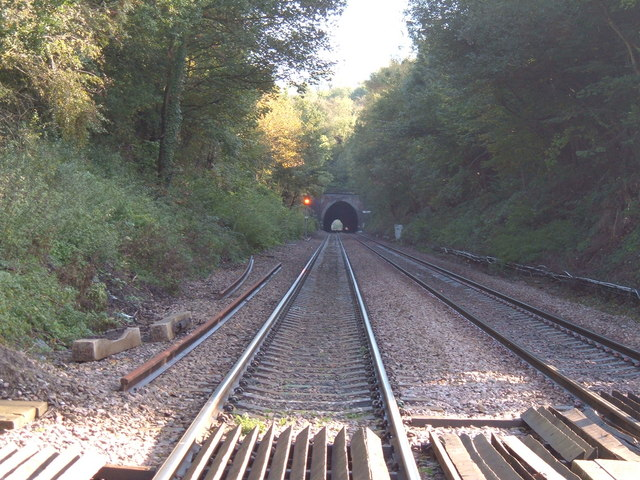
Clarborough Tunnel

=== Listed buildings ===
There are 14 listed structures throughout the parish, including:

Church of St John the Baptist, Grade I, Clarborough

Welham Hall, Grade II, Welham

Whitsunday Pie Lock Bridge 60 over the Chesterfield Canal, Grade II, Welham

Bridge 62 over Chesterfield Canal, Grade II, Clarborough

== Religious sites ==
=== St. John's Church, Clarborough ===
Although mentioning Baptist, this is a reference to John the Baptist, and not the denomination, as it is Anglican affiliated. The church dates from the 13th century, and is located to the south east of the village.

== Transport ==
The Sheffield to Lincoln railway line traverses the parish, south west to east. Two railway bridges cross the A620 road, one on either side of Welham village.

Clarborough tunnel is to the east of the parish along the railway line, and is 656 yards (600 m) long.
