= Listed buildings in Clarborough and Welham =

Clarborough and Welham is a civil parish in the Bassetlaw District of Nottinghamshire, England. The parish contains 14 listed buildings that are recorded in the National Heritage List for England. Of these, one is listed at Grade I, the highest of the three grades, and the others are at Grade II, the lowest grade. The parish contains the village of Clarborough and the hamlet of Welham, and the surrounding countryside. The listed buildings consist of houses, cottages and associated structures, farmhouses and farm buildings, a canal bridge, and a church and items in the churchyard.

== Key ==
Grade	Criteria
I	Buildings of exceptional interest, sometimes considered to be internationally important
II	Buildings of national importance and special interest

== Buildings ==
Name and location	Photograph	Date	Notes	Grade
St John the Baptist Church, Clarborough; 53.34135°N 0.89810°W		13th century	The church has been altered and extended during the centuries, including a restoration in 1873–74 by James Fowler. It is in stone with slate roofs, and consists of a nave, north and south aisles, a south porch, a chancel and a west tower. The tower has two stages, diagonal buttresses, two-light bell openings with hood moulds, an eaves band with four gargoyles, and an embattled parapet with four crocketed pinnacles.	I
Welham Grange; 53.33009°N 0.90900°W		1667	The house, which was remodelled in the later 18th century and extended in the 19th century, is in brick with floor bands, cogged and dentilled eaves, and a pantile roof with tumbled coped gables. There are three storeys and a T-shaped plan, with a front range of three symmetrical bays. In the centre is a segmental hood on iron columns, and a doorway with a fanlight. This is flanked by canted bay windows with flat heads, and the other windows are sashes with segmental heads.	II
Whinleys Farm House; 53.33736°N 0.87605°W	—	Early 18th century	The farmhouse is in brick, partly rendered, on a plinth, with floor bands, cogged eaves, and a pantile roof with tumbled coped gables. There are three storeys and an L-shaped plan, with a front range of three bays, a lean-to on the left, a rear wing, and a lean-to on the north. In the centre of the west front is a flat-roofed latticed porch and a doorway with a fanlight. The windows on the front are sashes with segmental heads, and elsewhere are casement windows and horizontally-sliding sashes.	II
Yew Tree Farmhouse and Ivy Cottage; 53.33251°N 0.90679°W	—	18th century	The building is in brick with floor bands, cogged and dentilled eaves, and a pantile roof with tumbled coped gables. There are three storeys, and an L-shaped plan, with a front range of three bays. In the centre is a doorway with a hood on curved brackets, and a pediment. This is flanked by canted bay windows with cresting, and in the upper floors are sash windows.	II
Whitsunday Pie Lock Bridge; 53.33060°N 0.91787°W		c. 1774–76	An accommodation bridge, it is bridge No. 60 over the Chesterfield Canal. The bridge is in brick with stone coping, and consists of a single segmental arch. It has a projecting arch ring, and swept wings ending in piers.	II
Welham Hall; 53.33072°N 0.90922°W		c. 1815	A small country house in colourwashed stuccoed brick on a stone plinth, with moulded eaves, and a hipped slate roof. There are three storeys and seven bays, and a single-storey extension t the left. On the front is a full-height semicircular bow window with a parapet and a flat roof, flanked by sash windows. At the rear is a porch and sash windows.	II
Coach house, Welham Hall; 53.33113°N 0.90953°W		c. 1815	The coach house, later converted for other purposes, is in colourwashed stuccoed brick, on a plinth, with moulded eaves and an eaves band, and slate roofs. There is a single storey and a square plan, with the buildings arranged around a courtyard. The east front has five bays, the middle bay projecting under a moulded pediment, and containing an elliptical-arched carriage entry with wrought iron gates. To the left are two round-arched recesses, and to the right are two sash windows with segmental heads. On the roof is a wooden cupola with a square base, and an octagonal bell stage with an ogee-domed cap and a wind vane.	II
Wall, railing and gate, Welham Hall; 53.33084°N 0.90836°W		c. 1815	The boundary wall of the hall is in brick with stone coping, and is about 100 metres (330 ft) long. At the entrance is a dwarf wall with rounded coping and iron railings. It contains circular cast iron piers, two taller ones flanking the gates and surmounted by urns, and five smaller piers with ball finials.	II
The Old Vicarage; 53.34131°N 0.89893°W		c. 1820	The vicarage, later a private house, is in rendered brick with a hipped pantile roof. There are two storeys, four bays, and a two-storey lean-to on the left. On the front is a flat-roofed porch with columns and a fanlight. The windows are a mix of sashes and casements.	II
Welham Park House; 53.32918°N 0.90961°W	—	Early 19th century	A small country house in stuccoed brick on a plinth, with deep bracketed eaves, and a hipped slate roof. There are three storeys, a square plan and three bays. In the centre is a porch with panelled columns and antae, and an entablature with a parapet. This is flanked by flat-roofed bay windows with cornices on scrolled brackets, and in the upper floors are mullioned and transomed windows. To the left is a smoking roof with a bow window and a conical roof, on the south side is a full-width lean-to extension with a rounded bay window, and at the rear is a single-storey single-bay scullery.	II
Lily Cottage; 53.34535°N 0.91123°W		19th century	The cottage is in brick with dentilled eaves and a pantile roof. There are two storeys, a single bay, and a rear single-storey lean-to. On the front is a doorway with a segmental head, and casement windows with pointed heads and Y-tracery, and at the rear is a doorway and horizontally-sliding sash windows.	II
Pair of chest tombs, St John the Baptist Church, Clarborough; 53.34134°N 0.89838°W		19th century	The tombs are in the churchyard to the west of the tower, and have a square plan, moulded plinths and cornices, and panels with Decorated tracery. They are surrounded by ornate cast iron railings in Decorated style, and have pierced traceried octagonal corner piers with cresting.	II
Gate and railing, Welham Park; 53.32983°N 0.91049°W	—	Mid 19th century	The gate and railing are in cast and wrought iron. The gate has a fan pattern and conical piers with finials, and to the left is a small wicket gate with similar piers. The railings extend for about 150 metres (490 ft), and are curved and ramped at the main gate.	II
Lych gate, St John the Baptist Church, Clarborough; 53.34103°N 0.89921°W		v. 1897	The lych gate at the entrance to the churchyard has a timber frame on a stone plinth, and a gabled tile roof. Each side has three square posts with curved braces to a bressummer with moulded ends. The lych gate contains a pair of wooden gates with a moulded top rail and posts with scroll finials, and to the left is a similar wicket gate.	II
