= Welham, Nottinghamshire =

Settlement in Nottinghamshire, England

Coordinates: 53.329°N 0.909°W

Welham
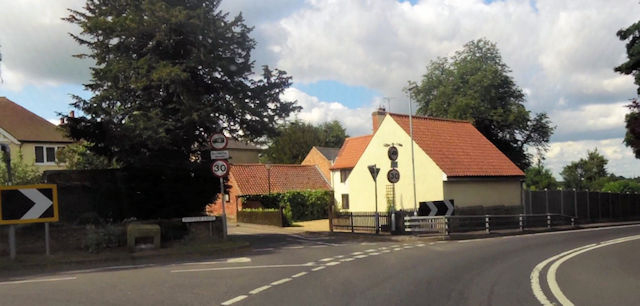
- Welham centre

- Location within Nottinghamshire
- OS grid reference: SK 72771 81986
- Civil parish: Clarborough and Welham
- District: Bassetlaw
- Shire county: Nottinghamshire
- Region: East Midlands
- Country: England
- Sovereign state: United Kingdom
- Post town: Retford
- Postcode district: DN22
- Dialling code: 01427
- Police: Nottinghamshire
- Fire: Nottinghamshire
- Ambulance: East Midlands
- UK Parliament: Bassetlaw
- Website: https://www.clarborough-welham.org.uk

Map

Welham is a hamlet in the civil parish of Clarborough and Welham, of Bassetlaw district, in the county of Nottinghamshire, England. It is 130 miles north of London, 28 miles north east of the city of Nottingham, and 2 miles north east of the market town of Retford.

There are 7 listed buildings in Welham.

== Geography ==
=== Location ===
This is 1 mile (1.6 km) south of Clarborough, separated by greenfield land, Primarily residential, it is a linear village along the A620, lying to the south west of the parish. It which gets its name from a once celebrated spring (St Johns Well) near the place, which was formed into a large bath. The spring is still located in a private house. Welham is listed in Domesday as "Wellun" (meaning 'at the spring'). Welham Grange, an intact house dating from 1667 which listed as a Grade II building by the English Heritage on 1 February 1967. Also in Welham is the early 19th-century Welham Hall.

Welham Bridge, although spanning the canal along the A620 road close to the village, is outside the boundary. It was formerly within the larger Clarborough parish.

Welham is surrounded by the following local areas:

- Clarborough to the north
- Little Gringley to the south
- Christone, North Leverton, South Leverton, South Wheatley, Sturton le Steeple and Westholme to the east
- Bolham, Retford and Tiln to the west.

=== Landscape ===
==== Woods ====
Primarily farmland throughout the parish outside the village, there is some small forestry east of Welham:

- Clarborough Nature Reserve alongside the railway line.
- Caddow's Wood and Hutchinson's Holt are wooded areas in the far south east.

==== Water features ====
The Chesterfield Canal runs from the south west to the north of the parish, west of Welham.

The Guns Beck stream forms part of the western parish boundary, before feeding into the canal.

==== Land elevation ====
Welham is low-lying, at around 20–25 metres (66–82 ft).

== History ==
This was also reported in the Domesday Book, as Wellun (at the spring). It is so named due to a well located at a house on Bone Mill Lane. In the early 1700s it was considered the waters had medicinal properties and a spa was built by John Henry Hutchinson of Clarborough Hall. It lost its popularity with the advent of the railways, which allowed travel by locals to other warmer spas.

The wider Nottinghamshire region was a heartland for the Puritans. One of the Mayflower Pilgrims, Edward Southworth was born in the village. Southworth was due to join the voyage to the Americas but eventually only realised the first portion of the overall journey via England, possibly due to ill health, so returning to Holland and dying there in 1621. His spouse Alice Carpenter eventually went to America, remarrying another English settler who became governor of the Plymouth Colony settlement, William Bradford.

The Chesterfield Canal in 1777 was opened to transport minerals and iron from Derbyshire to the River Trent. This enters the parish from the south west and passes Welham to the west. A number of locks and bridges are in near proximity.

By the turn of the 20th century Francis John Savile Foljambe of Osberton Hall, was a notable landowner and Lord of the manor. Other key locals by this time included C. E. de More Thorold of Welham Manor (son of Charles Thorold Wood), with Arthur Robert Garland of Welham Hall also having substantial landholdings.

Since 1945 Welham has increasingly become more residential in nature rather than solely agriculturally associated. There was an influx of workers into the area in the late 1950s when the Cottam and West Burton power stations were built.

The oldest part of the village is by a sharp corner on the A620 road. Given its small size Welham has a number of listed buildings, 17th century Welham Grange, Welham Park House and Welham Hall (two manor houses dating from the early 19th century). Whinleys Farmhouse situated at one of the high points is also a listed building.

The parish was named "Clarborough" until 1 December 2006, when Welham was officially added.

The village has occasional impact from flooding. The floods of 2007 had a notable impact, causing the closure of the A620 for over 12 hours due to flood water accumulating in the dip of the road surface under the low bridge between Clarborough and Welham.

The Welham Boys' School and Welham Girls' School in Dehradun, Uttarakhand, India, is named after Welham, as the founder of the school, Hersilia Susie Oliphant, came from the village.

== Governance and demography ==
=== Council administration ===
The settlements Welham and Clarborough are combined as one parish for administrative identity.

It is managed at the first level of public administration by Clarborough and Welham Parish Council.

At district level, the wider area is managed by Bassetlaw District Council.

Nottinghamshire County Council provides the highest level strategic services locally.

== Community & leisure ==
=== Chesterfield Canal ===
The canal runs to the west of Welham, from the south west to the north of the parish. A long-distance walking path called the Cuckoo Way runs alongside, reusing its towpath. The whole of the canal is designated as a Site of Special Scientific Interest (SSSI).

=== Clarborough Nature Reserve ===
This is atop the railway line and surrounding area. It is a limestone grassland and scrub woodland covering 5 hectares. It too is registered as an SSSI, and run by the Nottinghamshire Wildlife Trust.

== Education ==
There is a nearby primary school in Clarborough .

== Landmarks ==
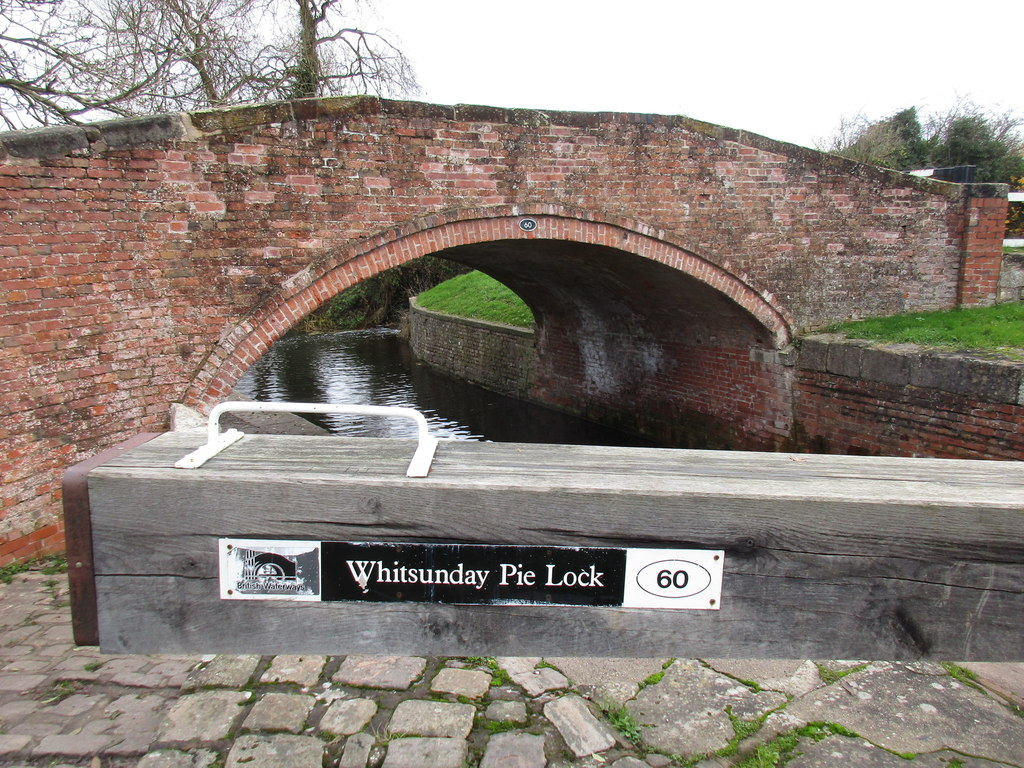
Whitsunday Pie Bridge 60 at Whitsunday Pie Lock over Chesterfield Canal, Welham

=== Listed buildings ===
There are 7 listed structures throughout the hamlet, all at Grade II designation, including:

- Welham Hall
- Welham Grange
- Whitsunday Pie Lock Bridge 60 over the Chesterfield Canal

== Transport ==
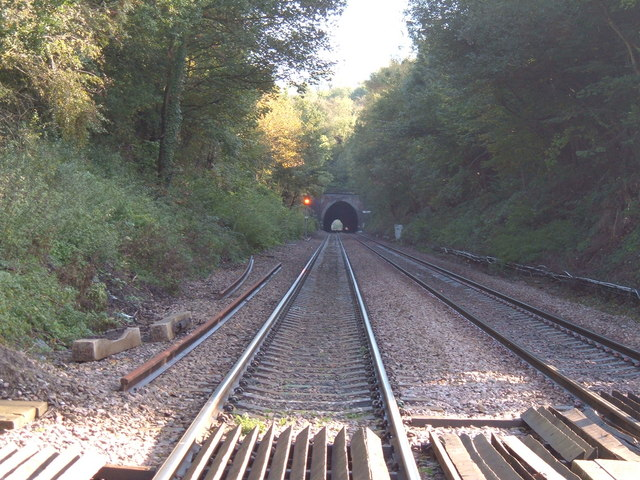
Clarborough Tunnel

The Sheffield to Lincoln railway line traverses the parish, south west to east, running between Clarborough and Welham. Two railway bridges cross the A620 road, one on either side of Welham.

Clarborough tunnel is to the east of Welham along the railway line, and is 656 yards (600 m) long.
