= St John the Baptist Church, Clarborough =

St John the Baptist's Church, Clarborough
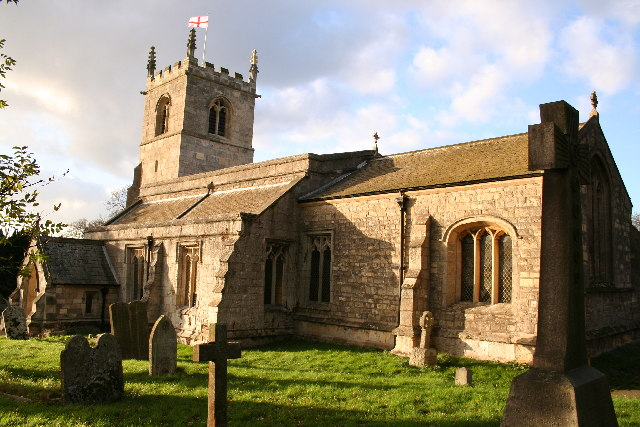
- St John the Baptist's Church, Clarborough
- St John the Baptist's Church, Clarborough
- 53°20′29.46″N 0°53′56.63″W
- OS grid reference: SK 73462 83279
- Location: Clarborough
- Country: England
- Denomination: Church of England
- Website: cwchurch.btck.co.uk

History
- Dedication: St John the Baptist

Architecture
- Heritage designation: Grade I listed

Administration
- Province: York
- Diocese: Southwell and Nottingham
- Archdeaconry: Newark
- Deanery: Bassetlaw and Bawtry
- Parish: Clarborough

Clergy
- Bishop: Rt Rev Porter (Bishop of Sherwood)
- Vicar: Rev M Cantrill (Team Vicar)
- Dean: Vacancy

St John the Baptist's Church is a Grade I listed Church of England parish church in Clarborough, Nottinghamshire, England.

== History ==
The church dates from the 13th century. It was restored in 1874 by James Fowler of Louth. The 1086 Domesday Book does not mention a church at Clarborough. There is evidence that a church was established by 1103, as half of its income was donated by William de Lovetot. The original building began construction in 1258 when Sewal de Bovil, the Archbishop of York, stipulated that the vicar of Clarborough should have the altarage, with the toft and croft lying next to the churchyard, and the tithes of the inclosed crofts of the town. The parish church of St John the Baptist was founded in 1260 which, with Manor Farm near the church, became the focus of the village.

A churchyard yew tree is possibly over 1,000 years old.

== See also ==
- Grade I listed buildings in Nottinghamshire
- Listed buildings in Clarborough and Welham
