= Grace Mary Linnel =

- Born: 1900; Leicester, Leicestershire, United Kingdom
- Died: 1970 (aged 69–70)
- Occupation: Educationist
- Known for: Welham Girls' School
- Awards: Padma Shri (1971)

Grace Mary Linnel (1900–1970) was an English educationist and the founder principal of Welham Girls' School. She spent many years in India and was associated with educational institutions such as Government Mahbubia Girls’ School, Hyderabad and Women's College, Hyderabad before joining with Hersilia Susie Oliphant of Welham Boys' School to establish Welham Girls' School in 1957. She was honoured by the Government of India in 1971 with Padma Shri, the fourth highest Indian civilian award.

== Biography ==
Grace Linnel was born in 1900 in Leicester, Leicestershire in the United Kingdom in 1900 to John Stockburn Linnell and Mary Elizabeth Smith. Shifting her residence to India, she took up the post as the head of Mahbubia Girls’ School, Hyderabad in 1922. She headed the institution, even after Indian independence, till 1956 when she moved to the Osmania University College for Women in the city, an assignment lasting only one year. Accepting the invitation of Hersille Susie Oliphant, the founder of Welham Boys' School, Dehradun, she took up the responsibility of setting up Welham Girls' School in the Himalayan valley town. Starting with a student strength of 10, the school grew under the leadership of Linnel and is now one of the notable residential schools in India, offering studies to 600 girls. The school has been the alma mater to several notable personalities such as Brinda Karat, Subhashini Ali, Neera Yadav, Kareena Kapoor Khan, Madhu Trehan, Tavleen Singh, Radhika Roy, Deepa Mehta and Laila Tyabji. She stayed with the school till 1970. The Government of India honoured her with the civilian award of Padma Shri for her contributions to the field of education in India. The life and work of Linnel has been documented by Khatija Akbar, one of her students at Mahbubia School, in a biography, A Teacher's Tale, published by Roli Books in 2007.

== See also ==
- Welham Girls' School
