= Bolham =

Bolham may refer to:

- Bolham, Devon, England
- Bolham, Nottinghamshire, England
