= Madhu Jain =

Indian textile designer

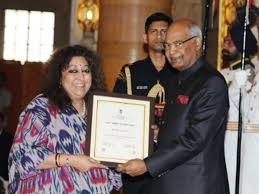
- Madhu receiving the Nari Shakti Puraskar from President Ram Nath Kovind in 2018
- Born: Delhi, India
- Education: Welham Girls' School; Waverly Convent School; Delhi School of Economics
- Occupation: Textile designer
- Years active: 1987–present
- Known for: Advocate for bamboo fabric and empowering women
- Awards: Nari Shakti Puraskar (2018); Ministry of Textiles Special Award (2019)

Madhu Jain is an Indian textile designer who is an advocate for bamboo fabric which she sees as the "textile of the future". In 2018 she was awarded the Nari Shakti Puraskar after 30 years in fashion.

== Life ==
Jain was born in Delhi. She went to Welham Girls' School and Waverly Convent School before she obtained a master's degree at the Delhi School of Economics. She started her career in fashion in 1987.

She created a collaboration with Milind Soman in 2003 that led to the brand "Projekt M".

In October 2010 over 4,000 athletes arrived in Delhi to take part in the Commonwealth Games. Jain was prepared and she revealed her work on the eve of the opening ceremony.

2017 saw Jain celebrating thirty years in fashion with a collection that included ikat and double ikat.

On International Women's Day in 2018 Jain was given the Nari Shakti Puraskar for her work with textiles and in particular for empowering women. The award was made at the Presidential Palace (Rastrapati Bhavan) in New Delhi by the President of India Ram Nath Kovind witnessed by the Prime Minister of India, Narendra Modi and the Minister for Women & Child Development, Maneka Sanjay Gandhi. About 30 people and nine organisations were recognised that day, receiving the award and a prize of 100,000 rand.

At the beginning of 2019 she was recognised for her leadership by the Ministry of Textiles. They had created a special award that they gave to seven people to recognise their contribution to the textile sector. Jain explained that she advocated the use of bamboo fibre for several reasons. India is the second biggest producer of bamboo and the fibre is bio-degradable, eco-friendly and non-toxic. She sees the fibre as the "textile of the future".
