= Welham Girls' School =

Girls' boarding school in Dehradun, India

Coordinates: 30.3163°N 78.0564°E

- 12 Circular Road; Dehradun-248001; India

Information
- School type: Independent
- Motto: Sanskrit: Aartt Shanti Pala Vidya (The aim of education is to bring peace)
- Religious affiliation: Secular
- Founded: 1957
- Founder: H.S. Oliphant
- Current Principal: Vibha Kapoor
- Founder Principal: Grace Mary Linnel
- Gender: Girls
- Age: 12 to 18
- Enrollment: 540
- Campus: 12 acres
- Houses: 5
- Colours: Blue and White
- Mascot: Kingfisher
- Publication: News and Views; Chrysalis; Techkey; Delphic; Kshitij
- Affiliation: ICSE; ISC
- Former pupils: Welhamites
- Website: www.welhamgirls.com

Welham Girls' School is an all girls boarding school located in Dehradun, Uttarakhand, India. It was established in January 1957 by Hersilia Susie Oliphant, who had previously founded Welham Boys School in 1937.

The school accommodates approximately 540 students between the ages of 12 and 18. Its student body includes pupils from multiple Indian states and Union Territories, as well as from other countries.

== History ==
The school was founded by Hersilia Susie Oliphant, who came to India in 1920 as a companion to the Princess of Cooch Behar.

In 1937, Oliphant established the Welham Preparatory Boys School (now Welham Boys' School) in Dehradun.

The name Welham is derived from a village in Wales. The school's motto, Artta Shanti Phala Vidya, is in Sanskrit and translates to the aim of knowledge is to bring peace.

The school began with an inaugural batch of ten students, later referred to as the First Ten.

The name Welham is derived from Welham, Nottinghamshire, a village in Nottinghamshire, England. The village is the home town of Hersilia Susie Oliphant.

During the early 1950s, Oliphant began planning the establishment of a residential school for girls in Dehradun. In 1954, she secured the use of Nasreen, a former estate in the Dalanwala area, after its owner, Dr. Hamida, agreed to make the property available for the proposed school. The estate had previously been occupied by refugees following the Partition of India.

At the Founder's Day of Welham Boys' School in 1955, Oliphant announced that she had rented premises at 12 Circular Road as the initial location for the girls' school. Welham Girls' School was subsequently established in January 1957 under the leadership of its founding principal, Grace Mary Linnell.

Oliphant had originally envisaged a boarding school accommodating between 150 and 200 students. As enrollment increased, the school expanded its campus through the acquisition of adjoining properties. Land for sports facilities was acquired in 1964, followed by the purchase of 17 Municipal Road in 1966 for the junior school and 6 Chander Road in 1967. The property at 19 Municipal Road served as the school's initial administrative and academic centre during its early years.

The school has been described in The Economic Times as one of a group of "old, rich and popular schools — the Eton equivalents in India ... These boarding schools are a state of mind in themselves, an attitude which can't be duplicated".

== Architecture ==
The campus of Welham Girls' School has developed around Nasreen, a historic building that served as the school's original campus. The structure, designed in the Neo Tudor style with half timbered elements, influenced the architectural character of subsequent campus development.

Originally known as Klonakitty, the building was later acquired by Dr. Sahibzada Saiduzzaffar Khan in the early 20th century and renamed Nasreen, a Persian word meaning flower. At the time of its acquisition, the building was single storeyed. An additional floor was subsequently constructed to accommodate residential and reception spaces.

The Nasreen estate originally extended across approximately five acres. The original building is characterised by Neo Tudor architectural features, including gabled roofs and timber detailing. Subsequent campus buildings were planned around courtyards and pedestrian pathways that follow the site's topography.

Over time, the buildings have undergone restoration and structural conservation, including repairs to architectural elements and interior features. As the school expanded, additional facilities, including hostels, laboratories, an auditorium, a hospital, and a swimming pool, were constructed using reinforced concrete frame structures with masonry infill while maintaining architectural compatibility with the older buildings.

== Academics ==
Welham Girls' School is affiliated with the Council for the Indian School Certificate Examinations and provides the Indian Certificate of Secondary Education and Indian School Certificate curricula. Prior to affiliating with CISCE in 1994, the school followed the Senior Cambridge examination system. In 2023, the school reintroduced the Cambridge curriculum for its middle school.

== Activities and associations ==
The school has five residential houses Bulbuls, Flycatchers, Hoopoes, Orioles, and Woodpeckers. Students participate in inter house academic, sporting and cultural activities, along with extracurricular activities such as performing arts, debating, photography and mountaineering.

The school also participates in the International Award for Young People programme and organises educational tours and trekking activities. Student exchange programmes are conducted with schools in the United Kingdom, United States, Morocco and Japan.

The school is a member of several educational organisations, including Round Square, the Heads' Conference, the International Coalition of Girls' Schools, the Indian Public Schools' Conference, AFS Intercultural Programs, the Confederation of Indian Industry, the Boarding Schools' Association of India, and the Dehradun Public Schools' Association.

== Museum ==
In June 2025, Welham Girls' School inaugurated a museum on its campus to document the institution's history since its establishment in 1957. The museum is housed in Nasreen, the school's original Neo Tudor style building. Its collection includes archival photographs, documents, memorabilia, and personal artefacts associated with the school's history, including items related to former principals, alumni, and staff.

Among the exhibits are a letter dated 24 January 1984 from former Prime Minister Indira Gandhi and artworks by R. K. Laxman.

== Extracurricular activities ==
The school hosts competitive events such as sports, craft, dramatics, music, dance and photography. Sports include basketball, hockey, swimming, badminton, lawn tennis, athletics, table tennis, karate, shooting and aerobics. The basketball team has won numerous tournaments and represented Uttrakhand at the national level. Several students have been chosen for the India camp as well.

== Notable alumnae ==
=== Art and Entertainment ===
- Kareena Kapoor Khan, actress
- Deepa Mehta, film director
- Alankrita Shrivastava, screenwriter and film director
- Nitya Mehra, director and screenwriter

=== Business ===
- Devika Bulchandani, Global CEO, Ogilvy
- Devyani Rana, vice-president of Coca-Cola India
- Laila Tyabji, co-founder of Dastkar

=== Journalism ===
- Radhika Roy, co-founder and co-owner of NDTV
- Tavleen Singh, journalist and columnist, Indian Express

=== Politics and Public Service ===
- Priyanka Gandhi, Member of Parliament
- Meira Kumar, former Speaker of the Lok Sabha and first woman Speaker
- Brinda Karat, Member of Parliament (Communist Party of India (Marxist)

=== Art and Design ===
- Mrinalini Mukherjee, artist
- Madhu Jain, textile designer

=== Literature ===
- Advaita Kala, novelist and screenwriter
- Deepti Kapoor, novelist

=== Sports ===
- Jyoti Ann Burrett, professional footballer
