= Hersilia Susie Oliphant =

English educationalist

Hersilia Susie Oliphant (1883–1962) was an English educationist who founded two secondary schools in Dehradun, India.

== Biography ==
Born on 17 August 1883, in Retford, England. She spent her early life at Clayworth Hall, Retford, Nottinghamshire.

She became an English governess for Gayatri Devi in 1920, leading to various teaching positions in Kanpur, New Delhi, and Dehradun.

In 1936, Oliphant founded Welham Boys' School (named Welham Preparatory School at founding) in Dehradun, aimed at broadening educational access. She named the school after her hometown Welham, Nottinghamshire.

Inspired to create equal opportunities, Oliphant initiated a sister institution for girls, named Welham Girls' School with the help of Grace Mary Linnel, a fellow educator from Hyderabad. The school was officially founded in 1957 with just ten students.

In 1956, Oliphant donated her assets to the Welham Boys' School, currently governed by a board of trustees. Following a return to England due to illness in 1962, Oliphant died later that year.
