= James Chiosso =

Italian nobleman and inventor (1789–1864)

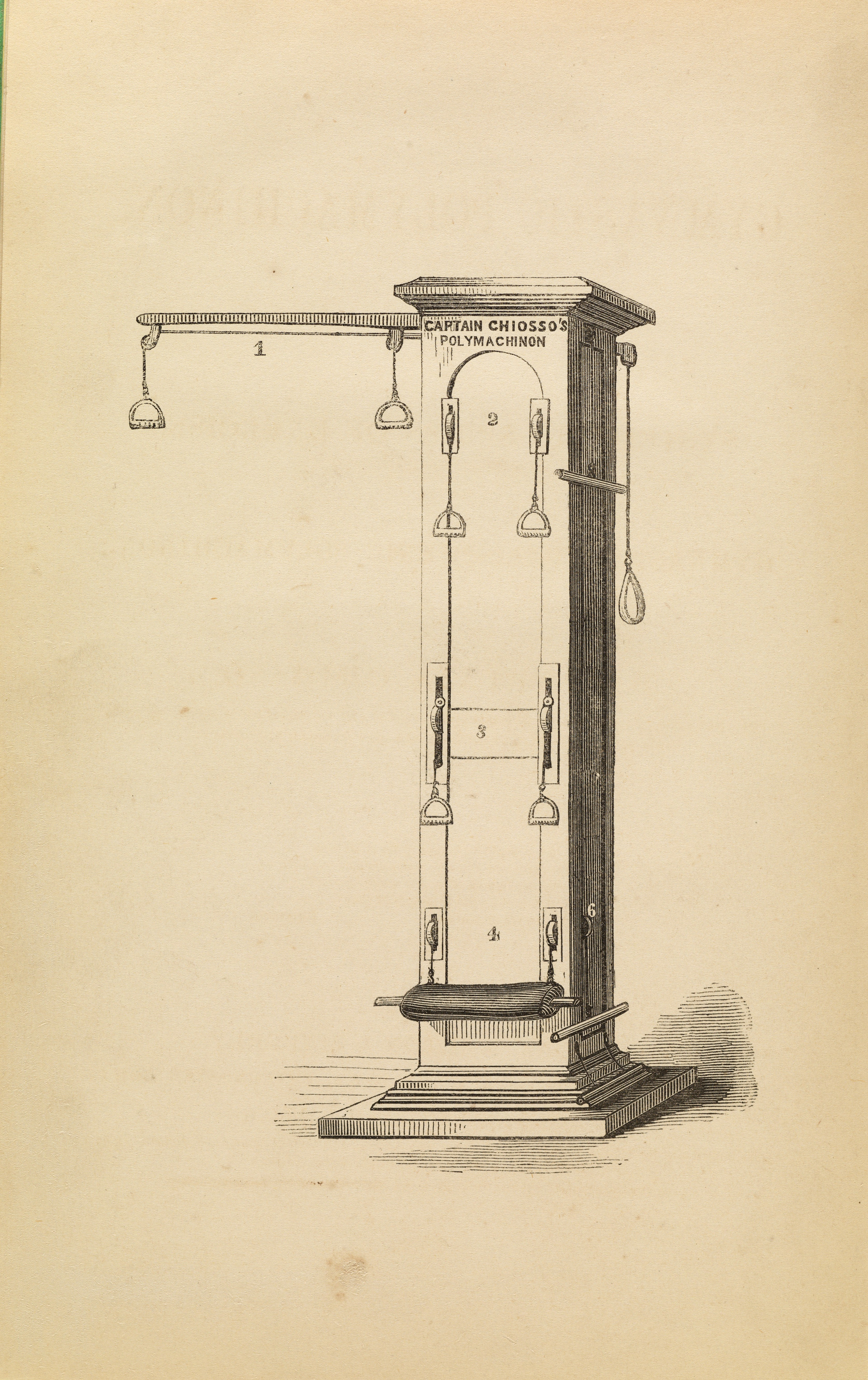
the polymachinon

Captain Giacomo Chiosso (c. 1789 – March 1864), later anglicized as James Chiosso, was an Italian inventor active in England.

He was born about 1789 into local nobility in Turin, Piedmont. He had three children by his first wife: Hannah (1816), Caroline Henriette (1828) and Antonio Martino (1829). His latter two children were born in England (Scampston, Yorkshire, and Foston, Derbyshire, respectively). After the death of his first wife, he married Harriet Oxtoby in 1835, in Scropton, Derbyshire.

In 1829 he invented the polymachinon (forerunner of the modern exercise machine). In the 1830s Charles Thorold Wood invited Chiosso and other scholars to tutor his sons in Campsall, Yorkshire. During his time in Campsall he was a regular contributor to the Society for the Acquisition of Knowledge, teaching local labourers French and current affairs.

Chiosso later became instructor of Gymnastics at University College School. He also founded the London Gymnasium and Fencing School (123 Oxford Street) and the Blackheath Gymnasium and Fencing School (D'Acre Park, Lee, Lewisham) which were still being run by his grandson in 1940. He died in Norfolk Villas, Bayswater, in March 1864, as later did his wife in 1877, and his son Antonio in 1893. His daughter Caroline emigrated to Australia, where her son Walter Wilson Froggatt, became an eminent entomologist.
