= Little Gringley =

Hamlet in Nottinghamshire, England

Coordinates: 53°19′17″N 0°54′3″W

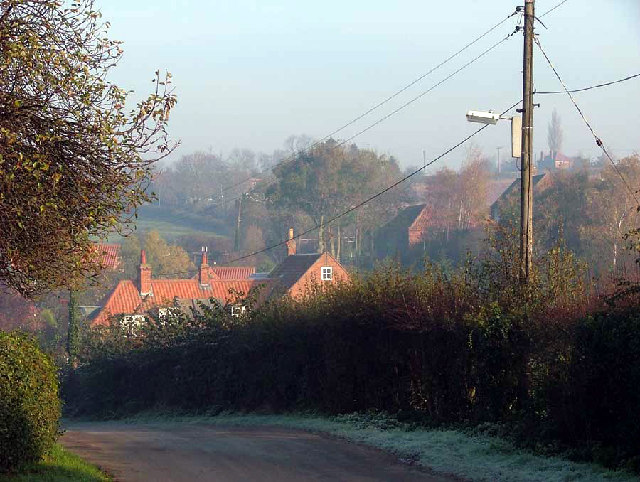
- Grove Lane, Little Gringley

- Location within Nottinghamshire
- Interactive map of Little Gringley
- OS grid reference: SK 73302 81077
- District: Bassetlaw
- Shire county: Nottinghamshire
- Region: East Midlands
- Country: England
- Sovereign state: United Kingdom
- Post town: RETFORD
- Postcode district: DN22
- Dialling code: 01777
- Police: Nottinghamshire
- Fire: Nottinghamshire
- Ambulance: East Midlands
- UK Parliament: Bassetlaw

Little Gringley is a hamlet in the Bassetlaw district of northern Nottinghamshire, England. It is 130 miles (210 km) north of London, 27 miles (43 km) north east of the county town and city of Nottingham, and 1 3/4 miles (2.8 km) east of the nearest town Retford.

== Toponymy ==
Little Gringley was Grenelei or Greneleig(e) in the Domesday Book of 1086, meaning 'green clearing or wood'. The Little prefix distinguishes it from Gringley on the Hill which is 6 miles (9.7 km) north within Nottinghamshire, and this was first used in records dating from 1587. J S Piercy, a local historian, in his book The History of Retford in the County of Nottinghamshire (1828) referred to it as Little Greenley.

== Geography ==
Little Gringley is surrounded by the following local areas:

- Welham to the north;
- Grove to the south;
- North and South Leverton to the east;
- Retford to the west.

This area lies centre east within Bassetlaw district.

The core of the hamlet is located where Little Gringley Lane meets Grove Lane. It is predominantly a farming community, interspersed by farms, the occasional residential dwelling and greenfield land.

Within this central core, the land elevation is approximately 35–50 metres (115–164 ft), the area being at the base of Durham Hill to the east.

== Governance ==
The area is in the former Municipal Borough of East Retford, which was not subsequently parished.

It is therefore directly managed at the lower levels of public administration by Bassetlaw District Council.

Nottinghamshire County Council provides the highest level strategic services locally.

== History ==
Gypsum alabaster is a mineral that appears extensively across Nottinghamshire and has been used both for carving beautiful sculptures and also for making plaster since the 13th century, if not earlier. At one time there was a lucrative trade in carved alabaster exporting across Europe, but competition eventually killed this off - but Nottinghamshire alabaster has been found all over Europe. One band of alabaster runs through the small range of hills east of Retford which were heavily quarried for it in the past and so got the name of 'Plaster Hills'. It was also used as a plaster in building applications, many of the houses of Retford being floored with it instead of wood. The quarries are still visible around Little Gringley - one forms a long and twisting gulley whilst another is more of a deep pit.

Edward Southworth, a local landowner born in nearby Welham, fled with the Pilgrim Fathers as part of the Puritans separatist movement. Edward was due to go to the Americas via the Mayflower ship but died in Holland in 1621. He left a small charity endowment in Little Gringley; some years later his widow sailed from Holland to New England and married William Bradford, the second Governor of the new colony.

There is evidence of a chapel of ease and a burial ground existing in the area, but of which there are no visible remains. When it was erected or demolished is unknown. Human bones have been dug up in the vicinity, along with a stone coffin.

Little Gringley was recorded in the Domesday Book as being owned by the soke of Dunham which was held by the monarch, with the Archbishop of York also holding some land. It further descended to the Norreys and several other landowners during the middle ages. In the early to mid 19th century, the area came under the ownership of the Eyres descended from Gervase Eyre at the nearby Grove estate, and eventually down to the Harcourt-Vernon family. Much of the estate including land in and around Little Gringley was sold by Granville Harcourt-Vernon in 1946.

Until 1894, Little Gringley came under Clarborough parish for local government. On 31 December 1894 the civil parish of North Retford which held Bolham, Little Gringley, Spital Hill and Moorgate was split from Clarborough to encompass the area for St. Saviour's Church. In 1921 North Retford was merged into the Municipal Borough of East Retford, which was abolished in 1974, with the village ending up within an unparished area.
