= Clarborough =

Village in Nottinghamshire, England

Coordinates: 53.342046°N 0.906715°W

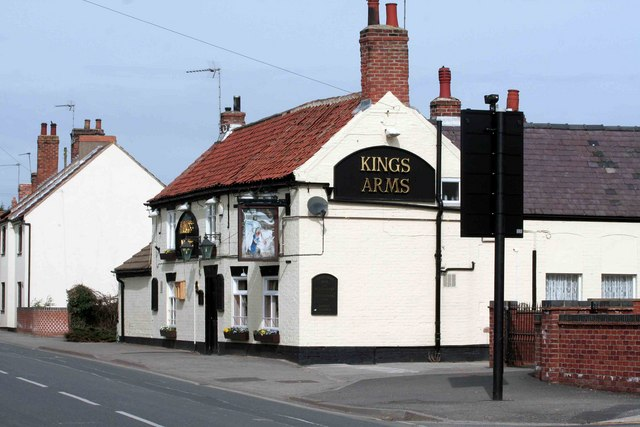
- Public house in Clarborough

- Location within Nottinghamshire
- Area: 0.802 km^{2} (0.310 sq mi)
- Population: 1,305 (2019 estimate)
  - Density: 1,627/km^{2} (4,210/sq mi)
- OS grid reference: SK731832
  - London: 130 mi (210 km) S
- Civil parish: Clarborough and Welham
- District: Bassetlaw
- Shire county: Nottinghamshire
- Region: East Midlands
- Country: England
- Sovereign state: United Kingdom
- Post town: Retford
- Postcode district: DN22
- Police: Nottinghamshire
- Fire: Nottinghamshire
- Ambulance: East Midlands
- UK Parliament: Bassetlaw

Clarborough is a village in the civil parish of Clarborough and Welham, in the district of Bassetlaw, Nottinghamshire, England. Clarborough is located 2 miles (3 km) north-east from the centre of Retford. In 2019 it had an estimated population of 1305.

== History ==
Clarborough is listed in the 1086 Domesday Book as "Claueburch" or "Claureburg." The chief value of the village was its land. Because of the village's geographical position, being at the foot of Clarborough Hill, land was useful for agriculture, including grazing. Being close to the increasingly important centre of Retford and with its parish boundary actually towards the centre of the town, Clarborough became an important local source of products. Since the 1960s, with development of power stations in the area and improved communication links, Clarborough (along with Retford) had significant population increases with associated housing developments.

A post windmill was located on Clarborough Hill. It was standing in 1753, but burnt down in 1896.

== Community ==
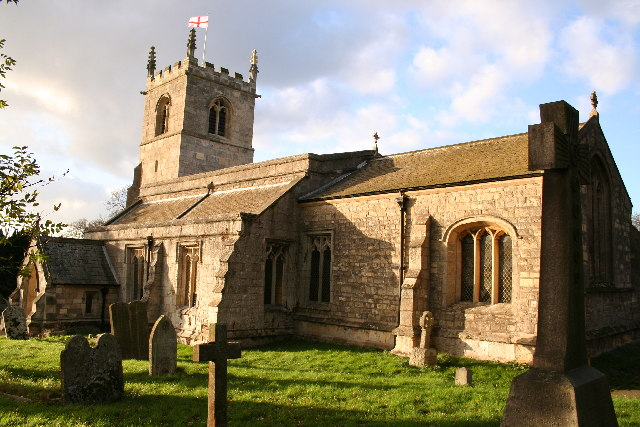
St John the Baptist Church, Clarborough

The parish church is dedicated to John the Baptist.

== Education ==
An elementary school was extant by 1 May 1871 and extracts from its Log Books suggest that the school might have been in existence before that date.

The school's capacity proved inadequate by the late 1950s. Initially this was addressed by an expansion of the Victorian buildings adjacent to the church of St. John the Baptist on Church Lane. However, as the village continued to expand through the 1960s, this too proved inadequate such that Nottinghamshire County Council initiated a proposed 2-phase development. The first phase, on newly created Hillview Crescent just off Main Street (the A620), was opened in 1970 and accommodated the junior classes – the Victorian building continuing to house older pupils. Phase 2 of this development was never carried forward as economic conditions of the early 1970s made it unaffordable.

By the 2000 conditions in both the Hillview Crescent building and the expanded Church Lane site made redevelopment a priority such that Nottinghamshire County Council announced plans to create a new building adjacent to the Hillview Crescent site as a single centre for primary education in Clarborough. The plans would see the demolition of the 1960s building and sale of the Church Lane site (still not accomplished in late 2013). The plans for the new building needed significant modification following serious flooding of that part of the village in July 2005, but the building was opened in September 2008 to accommodate all pupils of the school.

Plans were approved in 2018 for a two-classroom extension to the school.

== Transport ==
Transport links to and from Clarborough have always been few, because of the insignificant need to invest in major links, with such a small number of inhabitants moving regularly through the village.

The main changes in transport for Clarborough occurred in 1777, when the Chesterfield Canal was opened, providing navigation to the River Trent. This was the beginning of a period where Clarborough was being brought into the wider communication network, with and upgraded national road network, and the introduction of turnpike highways which allowed transport from Clarborough to larger towns such as Retford. One highway (1824–76), ran from Spital Hill at Retford to Clarborough, providing better links to nearby villages and towns. The new highways, and the canal, might have moved the centre of gravity of the village, today away from the church and towards the main roads.

A railway line was by 1849 running at the southern side of the village through the neighbouring hamlet of Welham. The railway allowed links to Lincolnshire and cities such as Manchester and Sheffield.

With the increase in motor transport in the 20th century, the main road through Clarborough and Welham (A620) was improved although low bridges on the already established railway line gave problems for traffic. The alternative route around the village (Tiln Lane/Smeath Lane) is not suited to heavy vehicles which use it.

== See also ==
- Listed buildings in Clarborough and Welham
