= Welham Boys' School =

Coordinates: 30.3189°N 78.0580°E

- Dehradun; Uttarakhand; India

Information
- Type: Public school
- Motto: From Strength To Strength
- Established: 1937
- Founder: Hersilia Susie Oliphant
- School board: CBSE
- Principal: Sangeeta Kain
- Staff: 75
- Grades: 4th to 12th
- Age range: 9-18 years
- Language: English
- Campus size: c. 37 acres (15 ha)
- Campus type: Residential
- Houses: Cauvery, Ganga, Jamuna and Krishna
- Colours: Brown and beige
- Song: Welham My Home
- Mascot: Tusker Elephant
- Newspaper: The Oliphant
- Yearbook: Welham Yearbook
- Affiliations: International Boys' Schools Coalition, Round Square
- Alumni: Welham Old Boys' Society
- Website: www.welhamboys.org

Welham Boys' School (informally Welham Boys' or Welham) is an all-boys private boarding school in Dehradun, Uttarakhand, India, established in 1937 by Hersilia Susie Oliphant, an English educationist. The school is affiliated with CBSE and has been ranked as the no. 1 boys' boarding school in the country as per the Education World rankings 2022.

== History ==
Welham was founded in 1937 as a preparatory school for boarding schools in England and India, by Miss Hersilia Susie Oliphant, an English lady, with a capital of £1000. There were no funds or staff, and no school buildings. Today the ratio of students to teachers on campus stands at 9:1.

She named the school after her home village of Welham, Nottinghamshire. She later founded a sister school, Welham Girls' School.

In 1956 Miss Oliphant donated all her assets to the Welham Boys' School, which presently is administered by a board of trustees. Mr. S. K. (Charlie) Kandhari took over as principal in January 1983. Today the Welham Boys' School (WBS) is an active member of the Round Square group of cooperation. The school hosts model united nations conferences as well as military awareness seminars

== Campus ==
Some major sites are the Learning Resource Center (LRC), the Activity Center, the White House (the oldest structure on campus), Bethany (Dining Hall), the hospital, the main field, lower grounds and various other fields, courts and ranges for sports.

The residencies are primarily the Oliphant House for Junior School, Shikhar Hostel for Jamuna and Ganga houses, Triveni for Cauvery house and Woodseats for Krishna house.

== Notable alumni ==
- Lt. General Prabodh Chandra Bhardwaj - Ex-vice army chief and a War hero from the Indo-Pakistan War of 1971 and member of the Board of Governors at the Welham Boys' School.
- Naveen Patnaik - Chief Minister of Odisha, India
- Mani Shankar Aiyar - Politician, Former Cabinet Minister of India
- Swaminathan S. Anklesaria Aiyar, Economist
- Shaad Ali - Film director
- Rajiv Gandhi - Former Prime Minister of India
- Sanjay Gandhi - Politician
- Zayed Khan - Actor
- Vikas Kumar - Actor
- Jubin Nautiyal - Bollywood singer
- Nawab Mansoor Ali Khan Pataudi - Former Captain of the India national cricket team, Nawab of Pataudi
- Vikram Seth - Author
- Kunwar Sushant Singh- Member of Legislative Assembly, Barhapur
- Wajahat Habibullah- First Chief Information Commissioner of India
- Miangul Aurangzeb - last Wali Ahad (Crown Prince) of the former Swat State
- Dhairya Karwa - Actor
- Lalit Modi - businessman
