= Charles Thorold Wood =

English ornithologist (1777–1852)

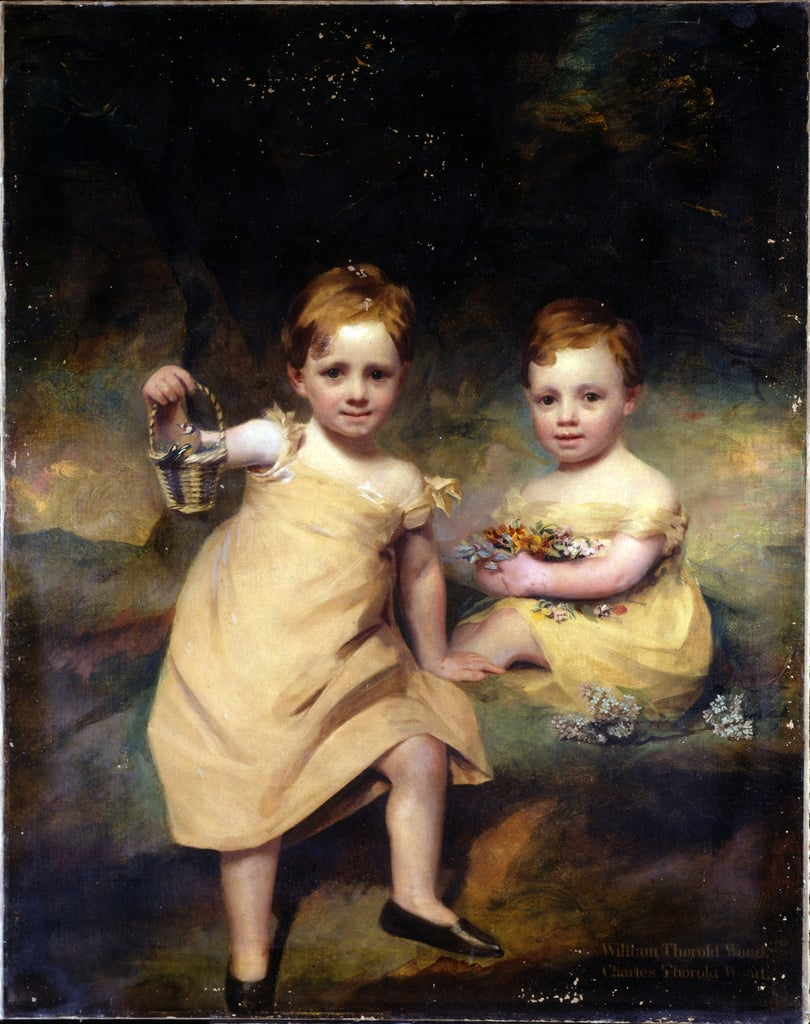
William Thorold Wood (left) and Charles Thorold Wood, junior, by Sir Henry Raeburn, c. 1818

Charles Thorold Wood, senior (15 January 1777 – 13 March 1852) was an English army officer and country gentleman whose sons Charles Thorold Wood, junior (1817–1849) and Neville Wood (1818–25 March 1886) were ornithologists. Several accounts have confounded him with his namesake son who wrote The Ornithological Guide (1835). Charles junior also wrote under the initials S.D.W. Neville wrote two books including British Song Birds (1836) which was dedicated to Edward Blyth, and The ornithologists' text-book (1836) dedicated to John Latham.

== Life ==
Wood was the eldest of the 9 children of Willoughby Wood, of Alford, Lincolnshire, Gentleman of the Privy Chamber and his wife, Elizabeth Thorold. Charles matriculated at Merton College, Oxford on 26 October 1795.

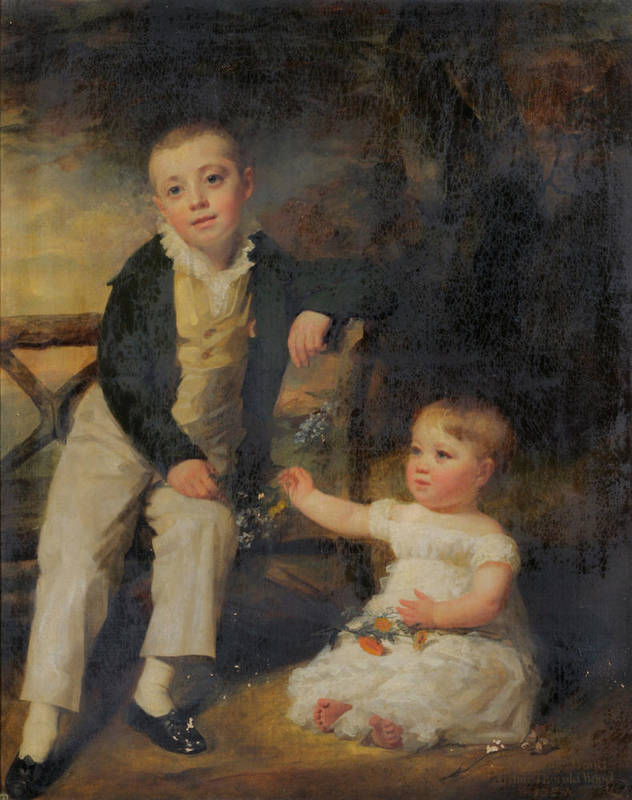
Willoughby and Arthur by Henry Raeburn, 1824

Wood became a captain in the Royal Regiment of Horse Guards (blue). He married Jane, daughter of Sir John Thorold, 9th Baronet, in 1812 and lived in Thoresby, Lincolnshire. They had five sons, Willoughby, William, Charles junior, Neville and Arthur, four of whom were painted as children by Sir Henry Raeburn, and three daughters. The family is said to have been utopian socialists with academic interests. Wood hired tutors for his children who included Edwin Lankester (1814-1874) and James Chiosso. In 1836 the family made a dramatic escape from a serious fire when they were living at Foston Hall in Derbyshire and moved to Sudbury Hall and later Campsall Hall north of Doncaster. Their sons Charles junior and Neville were both amateurs ornithologists. Charles wrote The Ornithological Guide (1835) at the age of eighteen and his brother Neville wrote British Song Birds (1836) the next year. Neville studied medicine and qualified MD and FRCP from Edinburgh. Willoughby (1814–1875) and Charles junior also had an interest in phrenology which was then a craze. Charles' Ornithological Guide dealt with standardizing the names of English birds. A basic idea that he promoted was that the name of a bird in English need to be parallel to the genus in the binomial. Charles junior also wrote under the initials S.D.W., describing the genus Dumetella in 1837. Neville's book made use of ideas from phrenology in the descriptions of birds. Neville published another book reviewing several contemporary works on birds along with his own commentaries. Reviews of Neville's books were not very positive, except for one published in The naturalist, a periodical in which Neville was an editor. Among the more severe critics was James Rennie, whom Neville called as a “Bare-faced Crow (Corvus nudirostris) of King's College”.
