= Bolham, Nottinghamshire =

Coordinates: 53.337°N 00.938°W

Bolham
- Location within Nottinghamshire
- OS grid reference: SK7082
- Shire county: Nottinghamshire
- Region: East Midlands
- Country: England
- Sovereign state: United Kingdom
- Post town: Retford
- Postcode district: DN22
- Police: Nottinghamshire
- Fire: Nottinghamshire
- Ambulance: East Midlands
- UK Parliament: Bassetlaw

Bolham is a hamlet in Nottinghamshire, England 1 mile north of Retford. Bolham Hall is an early 18th-century brick house of five bays. Bolham Mills on the River Idle is a tanning mill, the buildings being converted in the mid 19th century from a water-powered paper mill built circa 1800 .
