= Retford =

Market town in Nottinghamshire, England

- Town
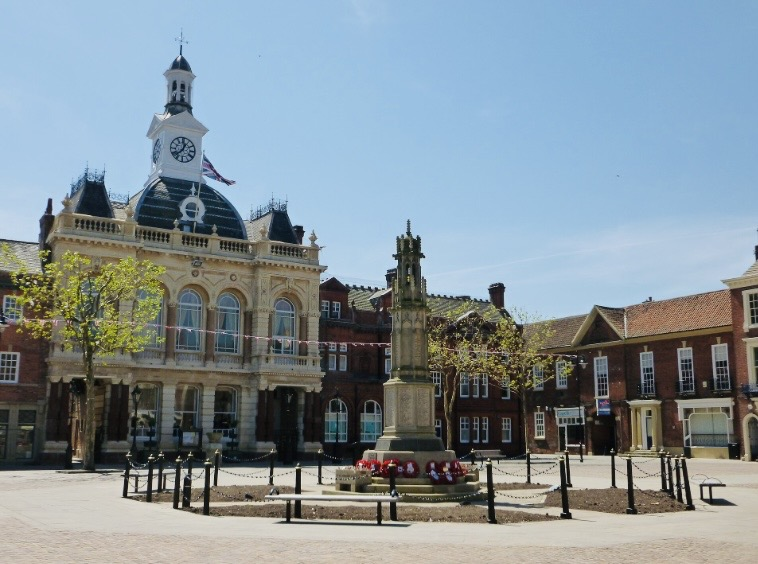
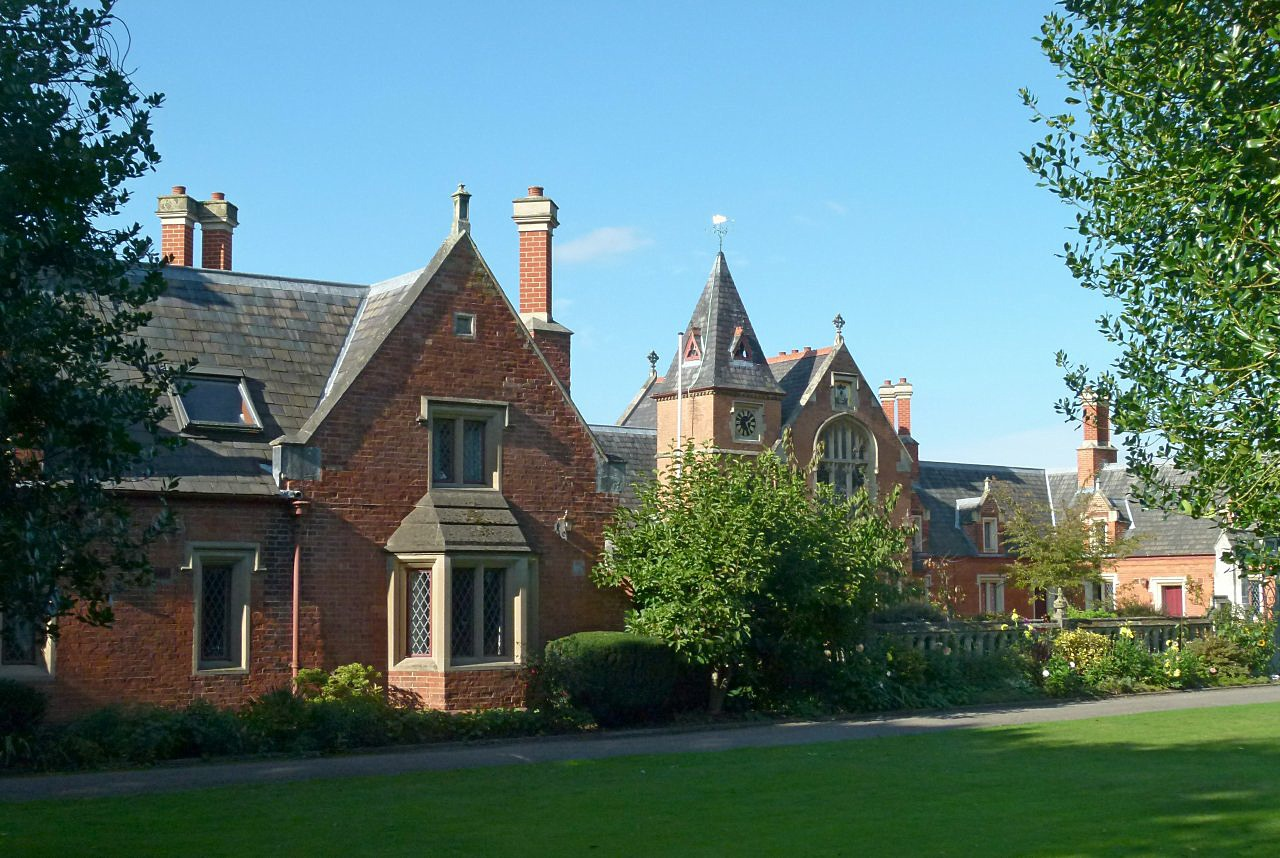
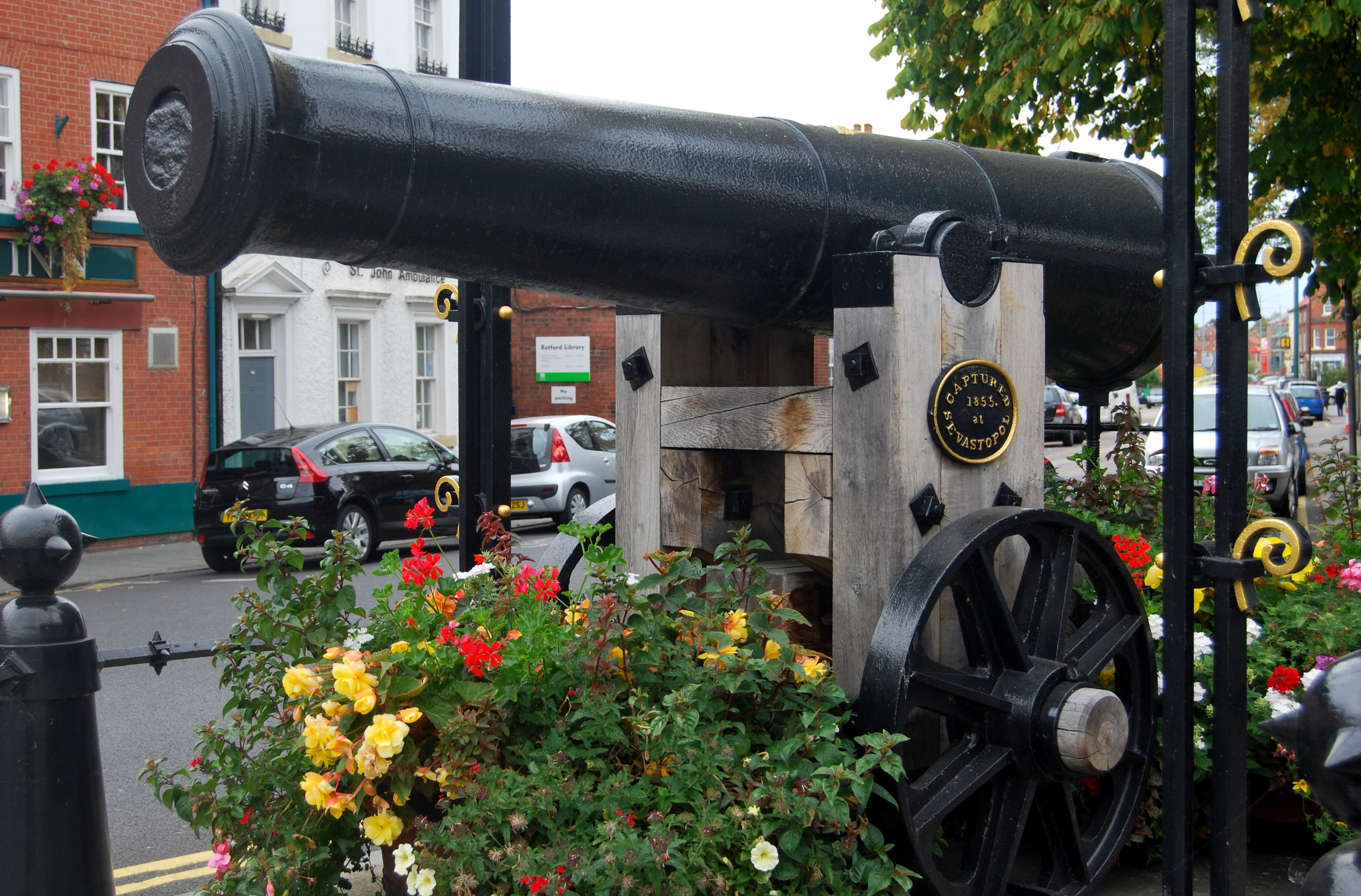
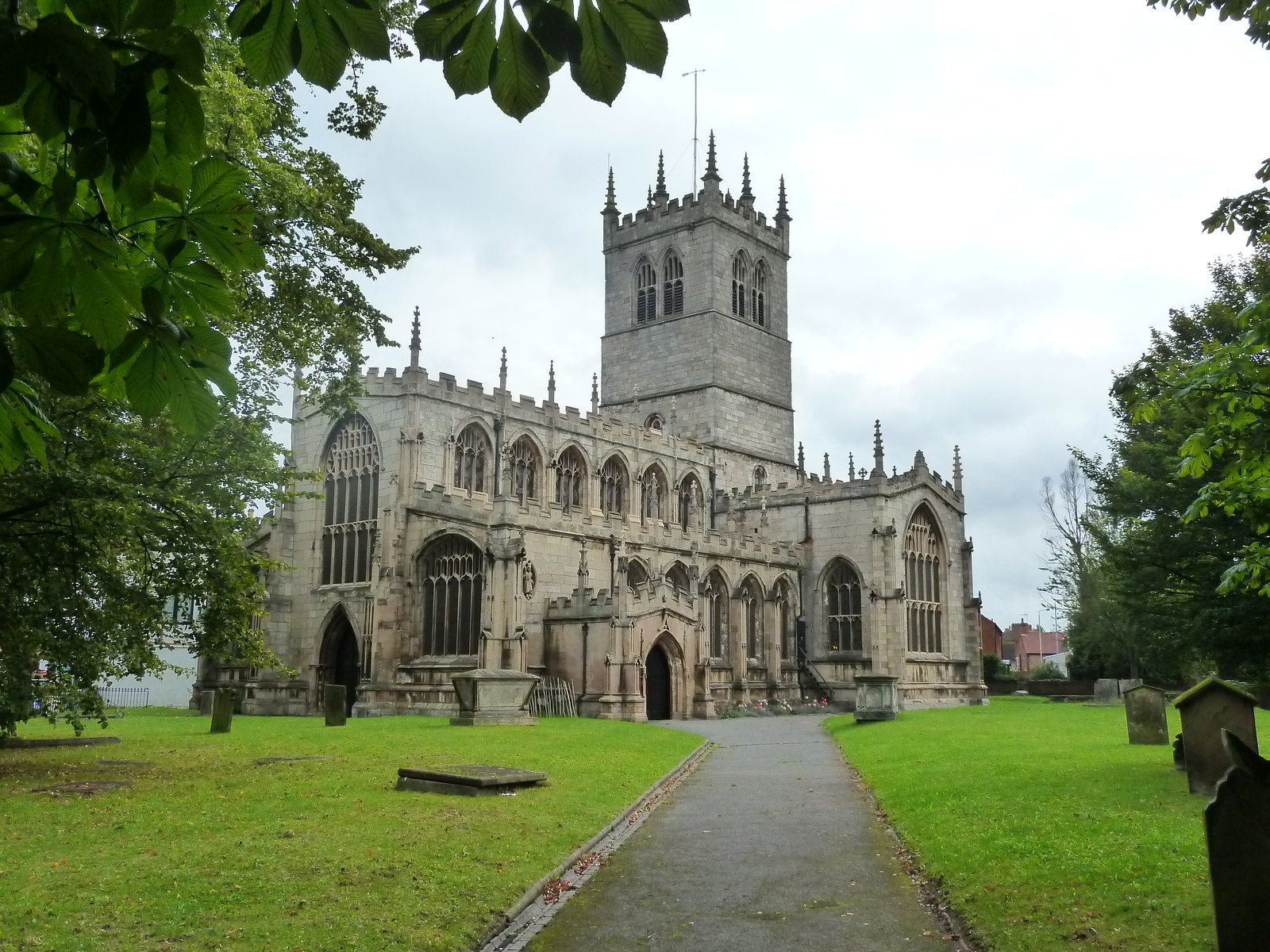
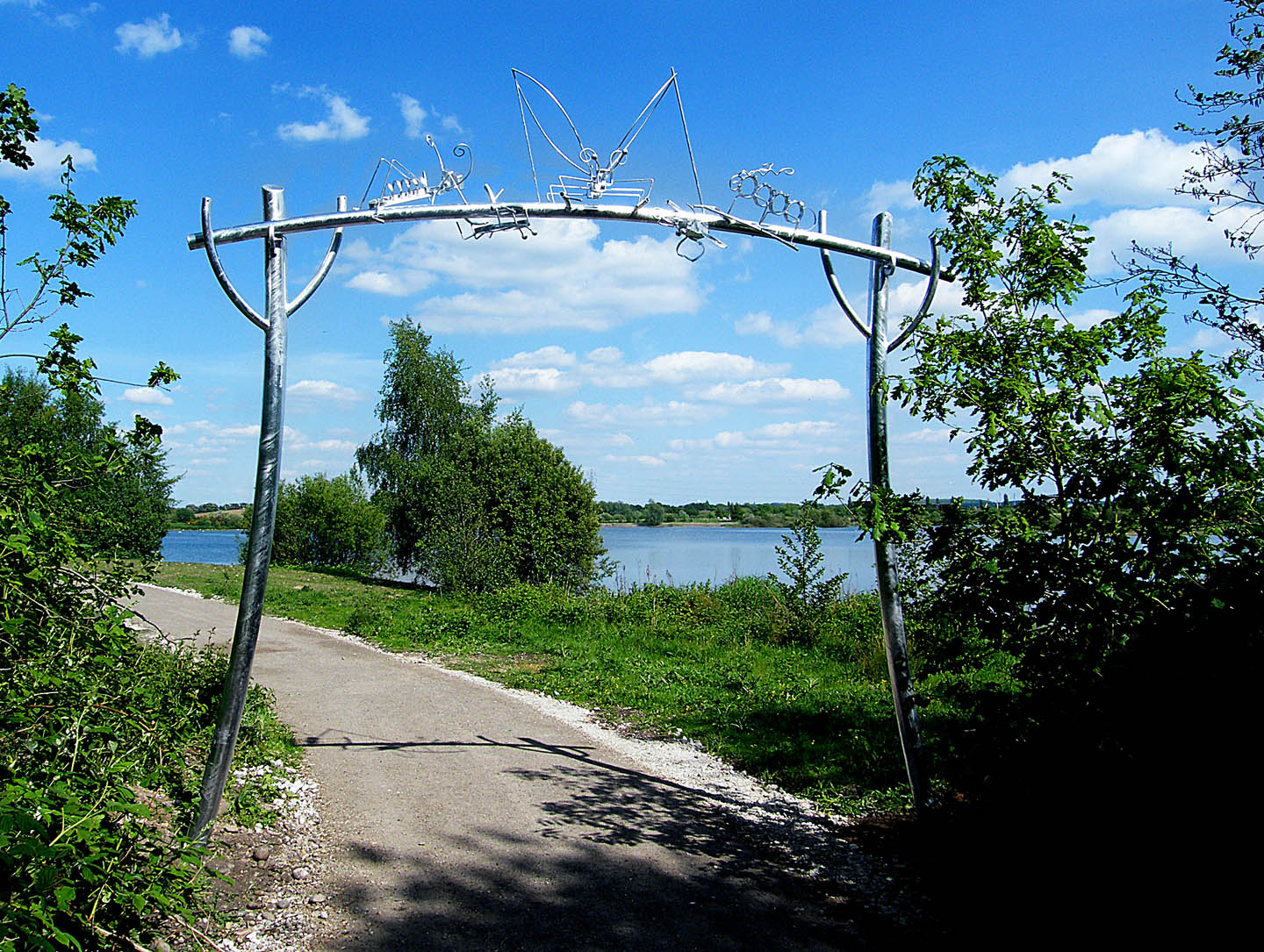
- Retford Town Hall Trinity Hospital Sevastopol Cannon St Swithun’s Church Idle Valley

- Historical Coat of arms

- Location within Nottinghamshire
- Population: 24,000
- OS grid reference: SK 70393 81201
- District: Bassetlaw
- Shire county: Nottinghamshire
- Region: East Midlands
- Country: England
- Sovereign state: United Kingdom
- Areas of the town: List: Bolham; Hallcroft; Moorgate; Ordsall; Town Centre; West Retford
- Post town: RETFORD
- Postcode district: DN22
- Dialling code: 01777
- Police: Nottinghamshire
- Fire: Nottinghamshire
- Ambulance: East Midlands
- UK Parliament: Bassetlaw
- Website: https://www.bassetlaw.gov.uk/

Retford (/ˈrɛtfʊd/), also known as East Retford, is a market town in the Bassetlaw District in Nottinghamshire, England. It lies on the River Idle and the Chesterfield Canal. Retford is located 26 miles (42 km) east of Sheffield, 23 miles (37 km) west of Lincoln and 31 miles (50 km) north-east of Nottingham. The population at the 2021 census was 23,740. The town is bypassed by the A1 road.

== Toponymy ==
The origins of the town's name are unknown and have been subject to much debate, but consensus seems to conclude that it gets its name from an ancient ford crossing the River Idle. There is considerable variation in how its name has been spelt historically, although in early usage it is usually styled as Redeforde or Redforde. A common explanation of the name is that the river water was tinged red due to the frequent crossing of people and livestock disturbing the clay river bed.

Other traditions include that it refers to the reeds that are plentiful in the river, or that the name references the Battle of the River Idle which was said to tinge the Idle red with blood.

Writing in 1908, local historian Edwin Wilmshurst proposed another theory:

"In the days of the Roman occupation of Britain, a great Roman Road, or "Strada"— Street— ran from Southampton to Derby, Little Chester, Chesterfield, Castleford, Pontefract, to Eboracum, or York: and from it, at Chesterfield, branched out a "Street" to the Roman Station of Lindum, or Lincoln, which crossed the River Trent at Agelocum, now Littleborough, and the River Idle by a Ford, still used as a watering place for horses, near West Retford Bridge; hence the place would be known as the Street-Ford, or Streteford."

— Wilmshurst, Edwin, "The History of the Old Hall of the Manor of West Retford"

The historical importance of the town as a river crossing is underlined by the fact that one of the main streets is named 'Bridgegate'.

The town is generally known as Retford, although the borough was officially called 'East Retford' right up until its abolition in 1974, despite West Retford having been absorbed into the borough in 1878. The town's charter trustees still use the name East Retford, but the Ordnance Survey now labels the town Retford on its maps, and the post town is likewise just Retford.

== History ==
=== Early history ===
Evidence of early human activity around Retford stretches back to the Mesolithic period, with archaeological evidence of human activity in the area including a Mesolithic flint tool found in Ordsall, an axe from the Neolithic era (New Stone Age) from Little Morton, and a Neolithic polished flint axe discovered near the River Idle at Tiln. A Bronze Age spearhead was found near Whinney Moor Lane, and Romano-British crop marks are visible around Babworth.

The area Retford is situated in was on the border of the territories of the Brigantes and the Corieltauvi during the Iron Age period. It is likely that the existence of Retford is partly due to its water resources, in the form of both the river Idle (and its crossing) and the wells that are dotted around the area that are either still in existence or can be identified from placename evidence. These include Spa Common, Cobwell Road (named after the Cob Well) and the ancient well at Welham (called 'Wellun' in the Domesday Book).

Between Retford and Grove there are a range of earthworks of unknown date. They may be pre-historic and/or Roman. There is evidence of a medieval moated site or possible motte & bailey construction. This site was later reinforced during the English Civil War. The wood here is known as Castle Hill Wood.

Roman-era artefacts are rare in Retford, although 1st–2nd century items were found at a site on Carolgate in 1922. The remains of a group of 1st–3rd century buildings were found at Babworth in 1981. A coin hoard was found at Little Morton that was dated to the 3rd century, and Roman artefacts and pottery fragments have been found at Tiln (Stroud, 2001). Evidence of Roman field patterns were identified by Derrick Riley of Sheffield University in the 1970s and 80s. Nottingham University archaeological researchers have said that during the 5th century and even into the 6th century, North Nottinghamshire was probably populated by "British communities with a sub-Romano-British culture".

=== Anglo-Saxon and Viking period ===
Retford has traditionally been placed within the Anglo-Saxon kingdom of Mercia because it is situated within Nottinghamshire. More recent historical research suggests that the South of Nottinghamshire and North Nottinghamshire may have had very different cultures. North Nottinghamshire, including Retford, belonged to an area called Bernet-seatte, which later became Bernesedelaue and then Bassetlaw. This territory is now thought to have been "substantially British". It practised, for example, partible inheritance, had British placenames and there is relatively little Anglo-Saxon material. West and East Markham seem to have been on the boundaries of this territory (maerc means boundary). It is not known if Bernet-seatte extended across the whole of North Nottinghamshire, or whether the Kingdom of Lindsey controlled the East of this area (Retford and Retford rural district). What is known is that this corridor of land was seen as strategic, which is why several notable battles were fought in the area between the kings of Northumbria and Mercia.

The strategic Battle of the River Idle (617) was fought in or near Retford. The Battle of the River Idle was significant in establishing Rædwald's power, such that Bede called him "Rex Anglorum" (King of the Angles). Various battlesites have been suggested including at Retford, Eaton and Bawtry. No evidence of a battlefield has been found in any of these sites, although according to Hunt this led to a saying: "The River Idle was foul with the blood of Englishmen". A variant local tradition says this was the origin of the name "Redforde".

Placename evidence in Retford does suggest Viking settlement. Many of the streets in the centre of town are -gates, deriving from the Old Norse gata, which means street. In Retford there are streets named Moorgate, Bridgegate, Chapelgate, Churchgate and Carolgate. Grove Street was previously known as Newgate and Lidgett Lane was originally Hildgeat or Hildgate. The Reverend WP McFarren (1947) wrote that Bridgegate was previously spelt Briggate (1340) suggesting the river had a bridge from a very early date. Moorgate contains both Anglo-Saxon (AS) and Old Norse (ON) elements, deriving from AS mor and ON gate. Its literal meaning is 'miry street'. This is a reference to the beck that used to cross it. (This beck was progressively contained within a culvert and is no longer visible for most of its course into the Idle.) Carolgate is derived from the ON karla (karl) + ON gate. A karl was a freeman. WP McFarren (1947) also mentions a 'Kynegesgate' (Kingsgate), which is now lost. Piercy mentions Carhillgate (p. 146).

Timber piles were found in Retford in 1995 on the western bank of the Idle at Bridgegate, which were dated to 947-1030 AD.

=== Norman period and Middle Ages ===
In the Domesday Book of 1086, Retford was recorded as Redforde, and joined to Odesthorpe (now unknown). It was held by the Archbishop of York and Roger de Busli, a Norman baron who was granted large amounts of land in what had been Anglo-Saxon Mercia. The Domesday Book does not distinguish between East Retford and West Retford, and it is thought that the Retford referred to was West Retford. The Retford described was a relatively small settlement, with no mention of urban trades or burgesses.

By tradition, East Retford claims to have been given a charter in 1105 by Henry I, although the earliest charter referring to it as a borough dates from the thirteenth century. In total, Retford was granted 17 Royal Charters up to 1607, which gave permission for a series of rights. Piercy (1828) says Retford was granted a charter in 1246 by Henry III, which allowed an eight-day annual fair to be held. Other charters gave the right to hold a market and the 1225 Letters Patent granted the right to levy tolls on travellers in North Nottinghamshire.

It is unclear exactly when Retford became a borough. Ballard & Tait (1923) and Dolby (1997) say there is no surviving historical evidence to support the claim it was in 1105, with the 1259 charter the earliest known to have been granted. The earliest surviving charter dates from 1313 and is now held in the Bassetlaw Museum. Despite this debate, Retford was the second place to become a borough in the county of Nottinghamshire after Nottingham itself; the next borough to be created in the county was Newark in 1549.

According to Marcombe (1993), there was an intention for Retford "to compete with the trading privileges of Blyth Priory and to exploit the market opportunities of north Nottinghamshire". In 1225, for example, the burgesses of Retford are said to have taken over the collection of 'river tolls' from Blyth Priory.

The first town hall or 'moot hall' was built in 1388 and demolished in 1754. It is believed this may have been situated in what is now known as Cannon Square. The hall was built of timber and faced east. On the ground floor of this building was the Shambles. At that time, what is now The Square was possibly used for cattle/horses, with Marcombe suggesting this was the site of the ‘beast market’ in the Tudor period.

=== 16th century ===
In 1528 a fire destroyed more than three-quarters of the buildings in East Retford. By 1552 Retford's population had dropped to 700. In 1558 there was an outbreak of plague, which caused 300 deaths in East Retford and killed half the people of West Retford. A fire in 1585 was so profound that the people of Worksop raised money for 'the poor men of the late burned town of Retford'. Yet another fire struck in 1631 and caused £1,300 worth of damage.

=== 17th century ===
The Civil War seems to have largely bypassed Retford, although W.E. Doubleday wrote in the Nottinghamshire Guardian (1947) that "During the Civil War a Roundhead force from Retford attempted to capture the mansion occupied by the Royalist Gervase Lee, but the attack was beaten off and the besiegers compelled to retreat as a party of Cavalier troops from Newark approached rapidly". Charles I was also said to have stayed in the house of Mr Lane, a lawyer, on 20 August 1645. He was on his way from Doncaster and set off the following day to Lord Danecourt's in Newark.(Wilmshurst 1908)

In 1657 there was a Great Storm, which destroyed the steeple and Chantries of St Swithun's Church. This was restored in 1658 at a cost of £3,648.

=== 18th century ===
During the Jacobite rising of 1745, Cornelius Brown records that an army of 6,000 English and Hessian troops camped on Wheatley Hills in 1745, marched through Retford and used East Retford (St Swithun's) church as a stable. This was The Derbyshire Blues, which had been formed to protect Derby under the aegis of the Duke of Devonshire, but which retreated 50 miles to Retford when reports reached Derby that the Jacobites had a 9,000 strong army.

On 23 August 1750, an earthquake struck Retford.

In 1757 the Town Clerk successfully petitioned for the Great North Road to be diverted to run through the town. This led to an Act of Parliament (1760) authorising its re-routing between Barnby Moor and Markham Moor in order for it to pass through Retford. A new turnpike was completed in 1765–66 and after this the town prospered. (Piercy 1828) Then in 1777 the Chesterfield Canal was built by James Brindley through the town.

During the 18th century improvements were made to West Retford Bridge - the main bridge over the Idle which is where the original ford was situated. Moss says that the first stone bridge was erected in 1659 and that it was thirteen feet wide and had five arches. Wilmshurst records that in 1752 the bridge was "widened for carts" and was replanked, suggesting that at least part of the construction was still wooden. In 1794 it was rebuilt on stone arches, according to Wilmshurst, with Moss adding that it was thirty-one feet wide at this time. Moss notes that before 1776 a toll was charged to cross the river and that the corn mills mentioned in the Domesday Book as once owned by Hubert de Burgh were to the north side. The 1794 bridge was replaced in 1886 with the current bridge, which Wilmshurst says was because of floods: "In consequence of these continuous Floods the Corporation demolished the great Mill, and the narrow 5-arched Bridge, and erected present wide girder Bridge in West Retford". Moss (1908) says this bridge (which he dates as having been completed in 1868) cost £1,500 to construct.

Moss (1908) tells us that in 1760, Retford's ducking stool was used for the last time. He says it was situated at the end of a narrow street opposite the Post Office that led down to the River Idle. The use of the ducking stool was granted in 1279 by Edward I and was used for the last time to punish a "Scotswoman of violent temperament" called "Dame Barr", who was ducked for offending John White by "throwing the contents of her snuff-box in his face, and uttering opprobrious terms".

=== 19th century ===
In 1801 there were 5,999 people living in Retford, which rose to 12,340 by 1901. Many improvements were made including the direct London to York railway being routed via the borough in 1849.

In 1831, the Gas Works was built by James Malam and gaslights were lit in the town for the first time on 22 December 1831. The Square was lit by a cast iron light bearing five gas lamps at that time.

The borough of East Retford was enlarged in 1878 to include Ordsall, West Retford and part of the parish of Clarborough. The East Retford constituency was a noted example of a rotten borough, being effectively controlled by local landowners the Dukes of Newcastle until reformed in the early nineteenth century. Retford and the surrounding area was also a centre of Nonconformism.

The Gas Works became a target on 2 September 1916 when a German Zeppelin dropped 14 bombs on Retford. The Retford Times (8 September 1916) noted that bombs were dropped from Zeppelin L-13 into the orchard that surrounded the Gas Works, and although there wasn't a direct hit, shrapnel hit the sides of the gasometers setting them on fire. This fire was said to be so intense that according to the Retford Times "apples [were] baked on the trees, and roosting wild birds roasted alive". The Nottingham Daily Express (8 September 1916) reported that the Zeppelin then departed "at great altitude and terrific speed". The manager and his family were said to have had a very lucky escape as the shrapnel also hit their house. John Hook records that the Zeppelin left Retford at 1.05am, dropping a further bomb just south of Lea.

One of the replacement gasometers later exploded on 16 March 1955, injuring 7 men and killing the manager. According to reports in The Retford Times, flames shot 200 feet into the air. The gasometers were finally dismantled when the town was connected to North Sea gas in the 1970s.

=== 20th century ===
One of the main changes in Retford during the 20th century was the opening of King's Park in 1938. The park commemorated the reign of George V and the coronation of George VI. The site was presented to the Borough by Mrs M J Huntsman of West Retford Hall, with £2000 towards the cost of the park layout raised by public subscription.

According to war records, Retford was bombed six times during the Second World War – on 26 September 1940, 30 October 1940, 16 December 1940, 15 March 1941 (2 injuries), 15 August 1941 and 25 August 1941. Although it was on the bombing route to larger targets such as Sheffield and Rotherham, was surrounded by airforce bases, and had the intersection between two railway lines, no-one was killed in the raids and the town escaped the war virtually unscathed.

The Great North Road was diverted around the town in 1961 and part of the old route through the town is now pedestrianised. The 1971 census showed the population to have grown to 18,407 inhabitants. By 2001, the population had reached 22,000 (Nicholson, 2008), with a large proportion living on housing estates in Ordsall, Hallcroft and Spital Hill.

=== Historians ===
John Shadrach Piercy was born in Rillington, near Malton, North Yorkshire, and moved to Retford in 1822 to teach at the National School (a school that traditionally had strong links with St Swithun's church) on Grove Street. While living in Retford, Piercy wrote The History of Retford in the County of Nottingham (1828). This is an important work because it contains references to material that has subsequently been lost. Jones & Co Solicitors hold the Piercy Manuscript.

Robert Thoroton was a physician and country gentleman who published a history of Nottinghamshire in 1667 entitled The Antiquities of Nottinghamshire. In 1796 a new edition was published by John Throsby (1740–1803), who added an additional volume. Retford is mentioned in Volume 3. pp. 274–280.

Dr Barry J. Biggs (1932–2003) was born in Leicester, graduating from Leicester University with a degree in history, followed by a teaching diploma from Durham and a PhD from the University of Nottingham. He taught at Darwen Grammar School (1956–61), then at Wesley College, Ibadan, Nigeria (1961–63), followed by Eaton Hall Training College, Retford (1963–80). He was the prolific author of over 26 books on the history of methodism and local history, including Looking at old Retford (1968), The Story of the Methodists of Retford and District (1970) and The lost windmills of Retford (1978).

=== Opinions on Retford ===
In The History of Parliament: the House of Commons 1820-1832 Retford was described as "a thriving and genteel market town in the hundred of Bassetlaw, on the border with Yorkshire, [which] boasted hat and sailcloth manufacturing, but had been superseded by Worksop in the barley trade".

William White in his Directory of Nottinghamshire (1853) wrote: "The approach to the town, from every side, is by a beautiful and gradual descent, and its open and spacious Market-place, surrounded by good regular buildings, and having several commodious streets of neat houses branching from it gives the whole an air of importance, comfort, and wealth, possessed but by few country towns of the same size."

In 1896, Cornelius Brown wrote that Retford was "discernible from the Great Northern Railway line as a mass of red-brick houses and smoking chimneys, with the tower of an old parish church rising in their midst".

Retford and its environs were thought to be sufficiently attractive for the railway company to organise trips based in Retford. Visitors stayed at the White Hart Hotel, with a fare inclusive of the railway journey, the drive (by four in-hand, landau, victoria or dogcart), and a couple of meals. C. Moss, author of a 1908 handbook, notes: "Attention, almost at the very outset of the journey, is directed to the beauties of the drive. By a gentle incline we pass into the fair demesne of Babworth. At the foot of the declivity, Babworth Hall, the church, the rectory and the lake, wherein shrub and tree are shadowed, naturally catch the eye... Not only does the proximity of Retford to the Dukeries make the town attractive to visitors, but it is also sought after as a place of residence... One of the charms of Retford is undoubtedly its antiquity."

Bill Bryson, the American author and former president of the Campaign to Protect Rural England, praised the town. In his bestselling book Notes from a Small Island, he writes, 'Retford, I am pleased to report, is a delightful and charming place even under the sort of oppressive grey clouds that make far more celebrated towns seem dreary and tired. Its centrepiece is an exceptionally large and handsome market square lined with a picturesque jumble of noble Georgian buildings. Beside the main church stood a weighty black cannon with a plaque saying 'Captured at Sevastopol 1855', which I thought was a remarkable piece of initiative on the part of the locals - it's not every day, after all, that you find a Nottinghamshire market town storming a Crimean redoubt and bringing home booty - and the shops seemed prosperous and well ordered.'

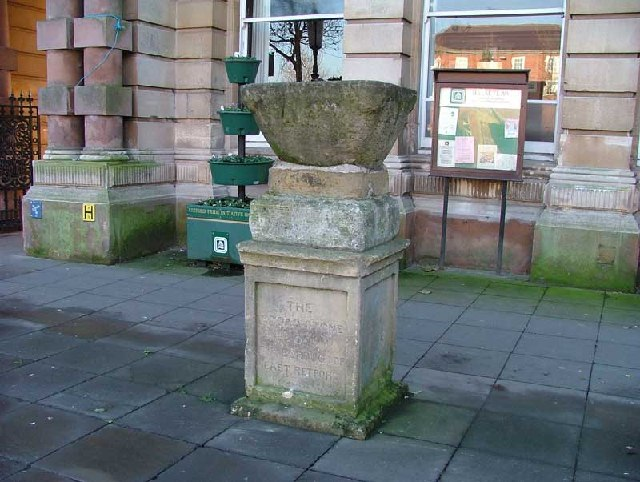
Broadstone in front of the Town Hall

== Geography ==
Retford lies in a shallow, fertile river valley which has a wide flood plain on either side of the River Idle. This makes the low-lying land next to the river prone to flooding. The underlying geology is Primo-Triassic rocks which lie over coal measures. This district therefore forms part of the Nottinghamshire-Yorkshire Coalfield. To the West are Pebble Beds and Sandstone outcrops. To the east are heavy claylands of Keuper Marl.

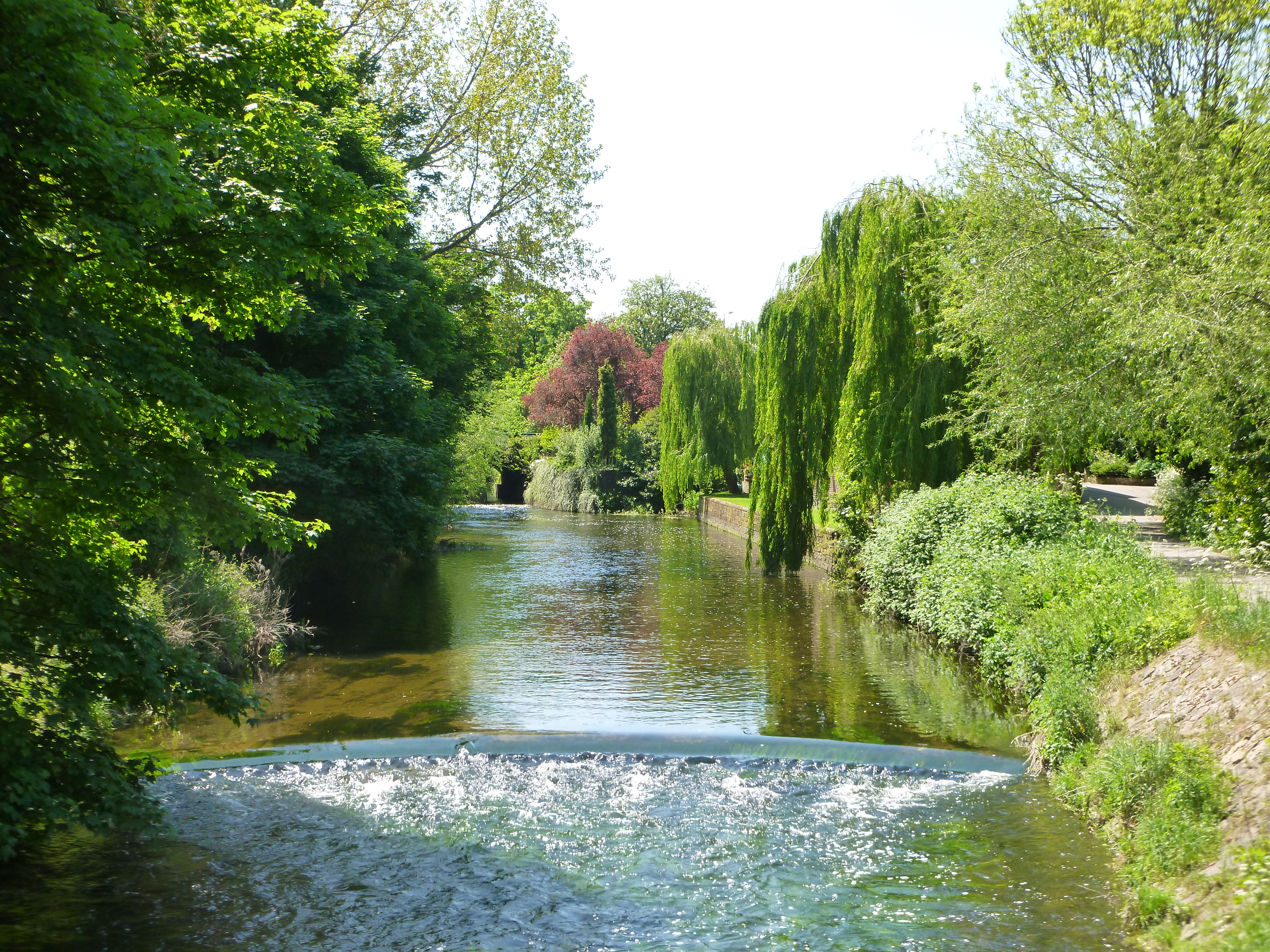
River Idle in Retford

=== Climate ===
Retford lies 18m above sea level and the climate is mild, and generally warm and temperate. The climate is classified as Cfb by the Köppen Climate Classification (temperate oceanic climate). The average annual temperature in Retford is 10.1 °C or 50.1 °F. Average rainfall is 685 mm or 27.0 inches. The nearest official Met Office weather station for which online records are available is an automatic station at Gringley on the Hill, about eight miles north of Retford. (Location: 53.406, -0.883)

=== Flooding ===
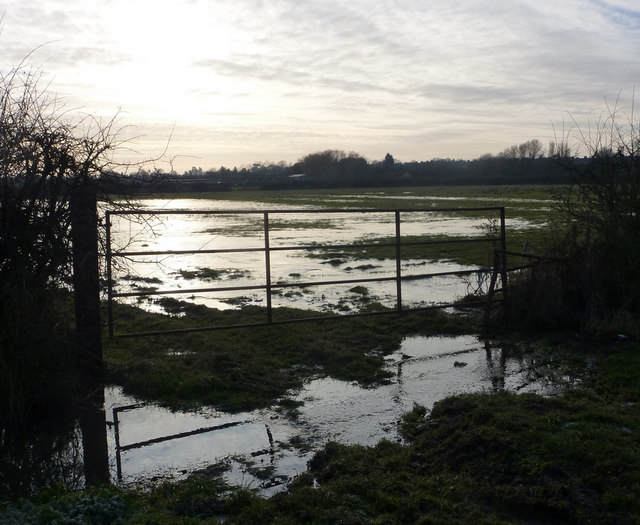
Flooded and frozen fields near Grove Lane

"The flood came on so sudden at Retford on Tuesday night, that great numbers of the inhabitants had no time to remove their effects, and several of them have received very considerable losses by it. It was three feet high in the Market-place, and the torrent ran so strong as to tear up the pavement in different parts of the town, which was nearly all under water. At West Retford a grocer's shop, and part of Miss Hurst's house were washed down, and four other houses were nearly destroyed, and their inhabitants preserved with the greatest difficulty."

— Nottingham Journal (1795)

Retford lies in the Idle River Valley and low-lying areas are prone to flooding. Flooding is confined to the well-defined and wide flood plain of the Idle, and areas above the flood plain or on sandstone (to the west) do not flood. To the north and east the land is clay and the area was historically marshy (see Isle of Axholme), but was drained by Dutch engineers under Cornelius Vermuyden in the 17th century.

Hardmoors, which is adjacent to the Idle at Ordsall, was so called because it floods and freezes in winter. According to the Environment Agency, which has a gauge on the Idle at Ordsall (location ID 4164) for 90% of the time since monitoring began the Idle has had a depth of between 0.19m and 0.85m. In 2020 the range was 0.22m to 0.86m. The highest level ever recorded since the gauge was put in place was 1.79m, reached on 22 October 2023, which was during Storm Babet.

In 1947, an article in The Retford Times by Rev. W.P. McFarren notes that Moorgate (one of the principal streets) derives from the Anglo-Saxon 'mor' meaning a marsh. The author notes that across Moorgate there runs a brook commonly called 'The Beck', which floods annually. He comments that "The soil here is largely clay, and Moorgate was well called the 'morgata' – the miry street".

Many floods are recorded in the historical record including:

- A Great Flood in 1775 which destroyed a house.
- February 1795 the town flooded.
- 1857 Great Flood, which covered the market place "and most of all Retford". It was 3 feet deep in the blacksmith's shop in West Retford and 10 feet on the Carr.
- 1872 there were "serious floods on 4 April and two other dates".
- There was a great flood in 1886 which caused considerable damage. The council demolished the bridge and built a new bridge in West Retford to facilitate the flow of water under the bridge.
- 1922 Flood.
- 1930 Flood.
- On 27 June 2007, a few low-lying parts of the town were affected by the 2007 United Kingdom floods. The majority of Kings Park was flooded under three feet of water. The Asda and Morrisons supermarkets adjacent to the river were also flooded.
- In November 2019, Retford along with the surrounding areas suffered extensive flooding along the Idle flood plain, including in the centre of town where the Idle crosses King's Park and around the Idle bridge in Ordsall. The local hedgehog rescue centre was flooded, with locals having to rally round to save 70 rescue hedgehogs.
- In March 2020 there was flooding at Grove Lane and Blackstope Lane, with 31 properties affected after a month's worth of rain fell in 24 hours.
- In January 2021 there was flooding on low-lying land along the course of the Idle near Victoria Road which is currently used for allotments. This resulted in another call for action against flooding which has been partly attributed to building on the natural flood plain. Restoration of the flood plain has been one solution suggested to address the issue.
- Extensive flooding was recorded and 200 houses were evacuated in October 2023 due to Storm Babet.

=== Nature and biodiversity ===
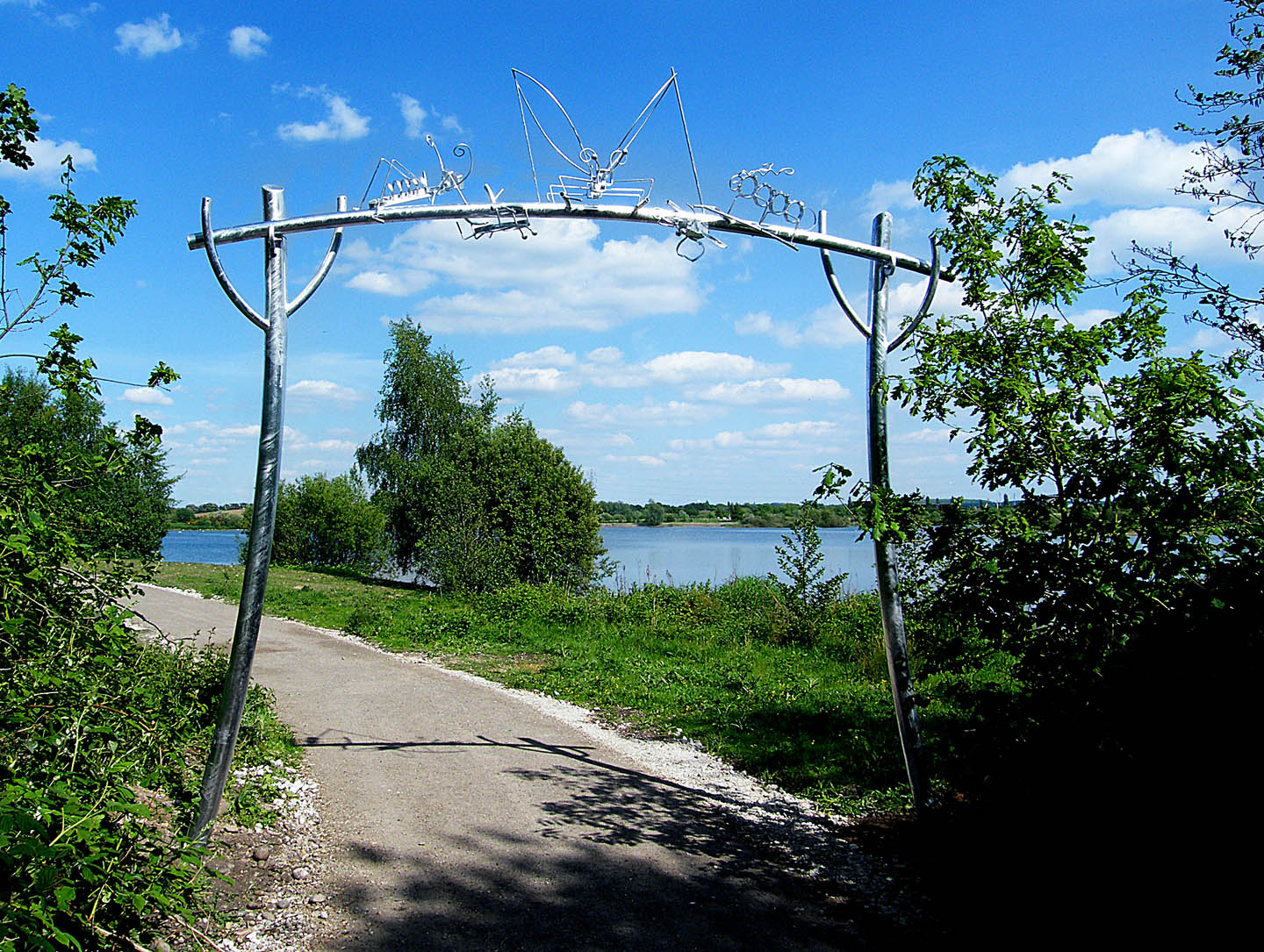
Bug Arch at Idle Valley Nature Reserve

The area in and around Retford has a varied geology and habitat. There are 30 known Ancient woodlands of more than 2 hectares in Bassetlaw, and the town is surrounded by a rich and diverse ecosystem including rare and endangered animals and birds.

The Idle Valley Nature Reserve, which is managed by Nottinghamshire Wildlife Trust (NWT) lies on the northern edge of the town, with the eastern boundary being the River Idle. Idle Valley is the largest of the trust's reserves in Nottinghamshire, and features a mixture of habitats spread over 450 hectares, with 300 hectares being designated with SSSI status. Previously farmland, it is now the largest wetland area in Nottinghamshire, largely due to the reuse and rewilding of redundant gravel quarries. Over 250 species of birds have been recorded at the site, making it one of the top birding sites in the UK. The reserve is known for spectacular starling murmations. NWT has a program of activities and events for the benefit of schools, community groups and individuals.

The River Idle is a critical habitat for eels – with an eel pass being installed in 2018 to help silver eels get upstream. Nine species of bats have been recorded in and around the town including Daubenton's bat, whiskered bat, Brandt's bat, Natterer's bat, common noctule, Leisler's bat, common pipistrelle, soprano pipistrelle and brown long-eared bat. And a range of mammals and amphibians can be seen such as hedgehog, frog, rabbit, brown hare, grey squirrel, toad, newts, mole, badger and red fox.

In 2021, Nottinghamshire Wildlife Trust revealed that it had consulted on the re-introduction of beavers to the Idle valley and planned to release 4 beavers (2 pairs) into the Idle Valley Nature Reserve. The trust stated that it intended to create one of the largest beaver enclosures in England, with space for up to three beaver families. In November 2021, eight beavers - four adults and four kits - were released into a specially built enclosure, the largest release of beavers in the UK to date.

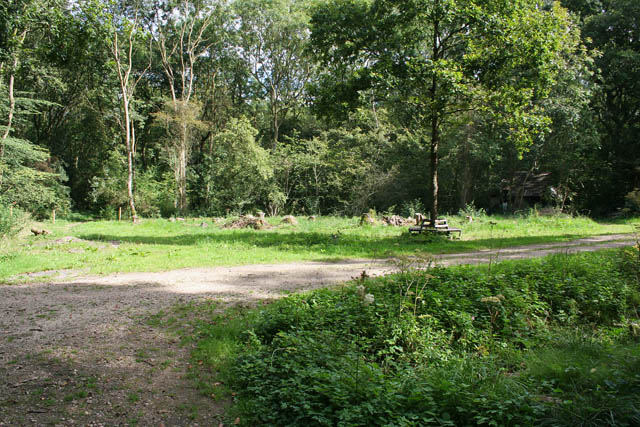
Treswell Woods SSI

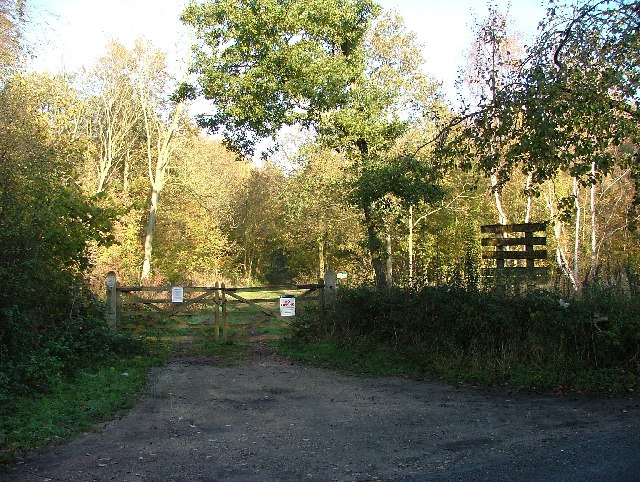
Eaton Woods SSI

Bassetlaw has 19 Sites of Special Scientific Interest that cover broadleaved woodland, wetlands and grasslands comprising 1361 hectares. The area also has 290 Local Wildlife Sites. SSIs around Retford, including the reason for their importance:

- 'Ashton's Meadow' - A hay meadow with a valuable flora. 3.6Ha
- 'Barrow Hills Sandpits' - An excellent area of grassland and scrub on glacial sands - of both invertebrate zoological and botanical importance. 2.9Ha
- 'Castle Hill Woods' - A unit of fine deciduous woodlands with a characteristic structure and species composition – of botanical and zoological interest. 33Ha
- 'Chesterfield Canal' - A representative stretch of canal supporting a nationally notable aquatic plant community characteristic of brackish waters, and a rich invertebrate habitat. 20Ha
- 'Clarborough Tunnel' - A fine example of species-rich calcareous grassland and scrub developed around the tunnel top and cuttings on an active railway line - a site of botanical interest. 7.9Ha
- 'Clumber Park' - A diverse area of mixed habitats of considerable botanical and zoological importance. 562Ha
- 'Eaton Wood' - An excellent deciduous woodland of botanical and invertebrate zoological interest. 24Ha
- 'Gamston Wood' - An excellent ancient woodland site of botanical and zoological importance. 41Ha
- 'Gamston and Eaton Verges' - species-rich roadside verges. 1.5Ha
- 'Mattersey Hill Marsh' - One of the best examples of mixed marsh in Nottinghamshire and representative of marsh communities in Central and Eastern England. 6Ha
- 'Misson Line Bank' - An excellent mosaic of open water, marsh, grassland and scrub communities developed around several old borrow pits. 20Ha
- 'Misson Carr' - Nationally rare wet woodlands, marsh, and old grazing pastures. One of the county's largest remaining fragments of a fenland system that once covered much of the local landscape, but which has been progressively lost to drainage and agriculture over the last three hundred years. 85Ha
- 'Mother Drain, Misterton' - Ditch and banks of considerable zoological interest and of some botanical importance 4Ha
- 'River Idle Washlands' - An extensive area of open water, marsh, grassland, scrub and wet woodland which support a rich assemblage of plants, invertebrates and birds. 575Ha
- Treswell Woods - One of the best remaining examples of ancient semi-natural broad-leaved (ash, oak, maple) woodland on clay soils in the county. Of botanical and zoological interest. 50ha. 3 miles East of Retford

== Politics ==
There are two tiers of local government covering Retford, at district and county level: Bassetlaw District Council and Nottinghamshire County Council. There is no civil parish covering the town, which has been an unparished area since 1974, but all the Bassetlaw councillors who represent the town's wards act as charter trustees. The trustees meet four times a year, usually at Retford Town Hall, and are responsible for looking after the town's civic traditions, including appointing one of their number as mayor each year.

=== Administrative history ===
East Retford was an ancient borough. When commissioners examined boroughs across England in 1835 it was reported that the town was a "borough by prescription", indicating that the exact date of it being made a borough was not known. The borough was reformed to become a municipal borough in 1836, giving it the right to appoint a mayor.

The borough of Retford, at that time, corresponded to the boundaries of East Retford Parish. In 1837, it was proposed that the borough should be enlarged to take in parts of the neighbouring parishes of Clarborough, Ordsall and West Retford, as the urban area now extended beyond the historical borough and parish boundary of East Retford. These proposals were not implemented. Instead, both the parishes of Ordsall and West Retford were made local board districts in 1850. The borough was finally enlarged in 1878 to take in the parishes of Ordsall and West Retford, as well as parts of the parish of Clarborough.

The Local Government Act 1894 said that parishes could no longer straddle borough boundaries, and so the part of Clarborough within the borough was made a new parish of North Retford. The four parishes in the borough were then East Retford, North Retford, Ordsall and West Retford; as urban parishes they did not have parish councils but were directly administered by the borough council. In 1921, these four parishes were merged into a single East Retford parish.

Despite including both East Retford and West Retford from 1878, the official name of the borough remained East Retford until its abolition in 1974. At that time, it became part of the new district of Bassetlaw, which also included the neighbouring town of Worksop. Bassetlaw was named after the historical Anglo-Saxon Bassetlaw Wapentake. Charter trustees were established at this time to maintain Retford's civic traditions.

The town's coat of arms consists of two rampant choughs, which were taken from an old seal of the Borough. The crest is based on the design on a Mace presented to the Borough in 1679 by Sir Edward Neville, with few changes. A small shield replaces the original rose, upon which the lion rests its paw. The shield features a deed which references the Borough's ancient Royal Charters. The unicorns are from the heraldry of Lord Galway, whose ancestors were High Stewards of the Borough. The shells are from the arms of Rt Hon FJ Savile Foljambe, appointed High Steward 1880.

=== Constituency ===
From 1316, Retford was a parliamentary borough (a constituency), entitled to two Members of Parliament, although by 1330 it was begging to be excused the privilege on the grounds of poverty, due to its inability to afford the cost of paying the heavy expenses of the MPs' travel to and from the capital. The petition was granted and it was to be several generations (1571) before Retford was represented again.

The East Retford constituency gained a reputation as one of the most corrupt rotten boroughs, being effectively controlled by the Duke of Newcastle. There were vigorous debates in Parliament over whether to transfer Retford's franchise to one of the larger unrepresented towns such as Manchester or Birmingham. Hansard records that during the House of Lords debates on the Disfranchisement Bill, the town had an active committee, led by a couple of attorneys and meeting at the Turk's Head Inn, who were trying to make the borough seem even more corrupt than it was to ensure its extinction. One of the committee members was later seen wearing a gold watch, apparently presented in gratitude by well-wishers in Birmingham. Viscount Howick objected to the disenfranchisement of Retford not on the basis that the accusations of corruption were untrue, but that it punished the innocent as well as the guilty and ignored the fact that many boroughs were equally corrupt.

They thought that East Retford ought to be partially sacrificed, in order to prevent the whole system of corruption from being overturned. Just as in a bullfight a cloak is dropped to turn aside the rage of the mad animal, while his assailant prepares more securely to destroy him. If the public were ignorant of the undue means by which a large majority of the Members of that House obtained their seats in it, they might declaim against the venality of the voters of East Retford; but, notorious as these circumstances were, he thought it better to pass over the present case in silence till they were prepared to deal with others equally flagitious.

— Hansard record of Viscount Howick's speech in the House, 1830, HC Deb 11 February 1830 vol 22 cc334-63

The 1830 Act extended the parliamentary borough's boundaries (which had previously matched the borough's municipal boundaries) to encompass the Wapentake of Bassetlaw, which included the whole of the northern end of Nottinghamshire, including the town of Worksop. All those within this area who were qualified to vote in the county elections were given votes for East Retford. Within a year, Parliament was debating the Great Reform Bill, but the extended boundaries meant Retford could retain its seats until in 1885 the Municipal Borough of East Retford was reformed and the constituency replaced by an identically delineated single-member county constituency - Bassetlaw. Retford and its rural district was removed from Bassetlaw in 1983 and transferred to the redrawn Newark constituency. The boundaries were redrawn again in 2010, with Retford returning to the Bassetlaw parliamentary constituency.

The Bassetlaw constituency was held by Labour from 1929 until 2019 when the sitting MP (John Mann) stood down and the Labour Party subsequently lost the seat to the Conservative Brendan Clarke-Smith. Labour regained the seat in the General Election 2024 and the current MP is Jo White.

== Landmarks ==
=== Market Square ===
The Square is in the centre of Retford and features an ornate French-inspired Victorian Town Hall (Grade II listed), in front of which is the Grade II listed Broad Stone.

==== Broad Stone ====
Legend says that the Broad Stone had a hollow in it that used to be filled with vinegar during plague times to disinfect coins. However, it is thought to be the upturned base of a boundary marker – perhaps the "Dominie Cross".

A 1908 guidebook to the town says the following:

Immediately in front of the Town Hall, in the Market Square, is the historic Broad Stone. It formerly occupied a slight eminence known by the name of Est-croc-sic, now called Dominie Cross. It is believed to have been the base of a cross, and to have formed one of four: a second is still preserved in the West Retford churchyard, a third was in the churchyard at Ordsall, the fourth is lost... these crosses probably marked the boundary beyond which inhabitants smitten with the plague were prohibited to pass. Certain it is that at times the plague devastated Retford (especially West Retford in 1558)...From Dominie Cross the Broad Stone was removed into the Market-place. It became the hustings where candidates for the two parliamentary seats allotted to this borough addressed their constituents, the freemen. Here, at various times, they were heckled, threatened, even assaulted. Woe betide the candidate who was not "all right". When 40 guineas were at stake it was serious to a freeman to "lose his election". Apprentices assembled here at the close of their "servitude" after a night's carousal and sang a ditty which is still preserved.

— East Retford and the Dukeries, A Handbook for Visitors and Residents

Stapleton suggested in his study of Nottinghamshire crosses that the crosses mentioned in the 1908 guide were market crosses.

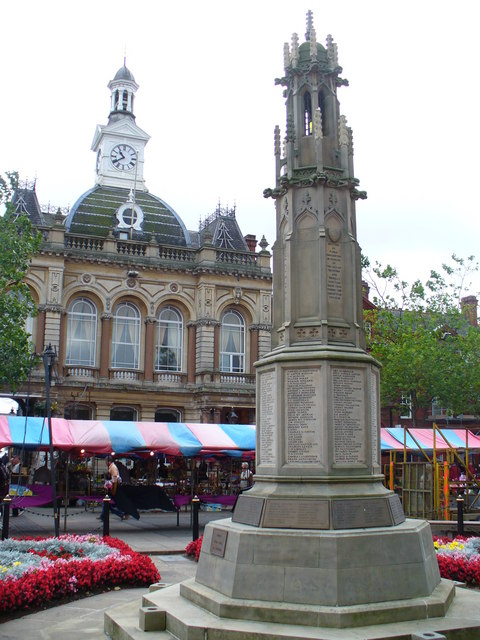
Retford War Memorial with Town Hall in Background

==== War memorial ====
The Grade II*–listed war memorial is in the style of an Eleanor Cross, an octagonal structure of late Gothic design. It was unveiled by Sir Frederick Milner, the town's former MP, in 1921. The memorial features an eternal flame, with the names of the men killed in the First World War on the lower eight panels, with bronze plaques containing the names of those killed in the Second World War. The monument was designed by architect Leonard W. Barnard FRIBA of Cheltenham, and built of Stancliffe stone from Darley Dale, Derbyshire by RL Boulton & Sons. A plaque for the Korean War was unveiled and dedicated on 17 August 2008.

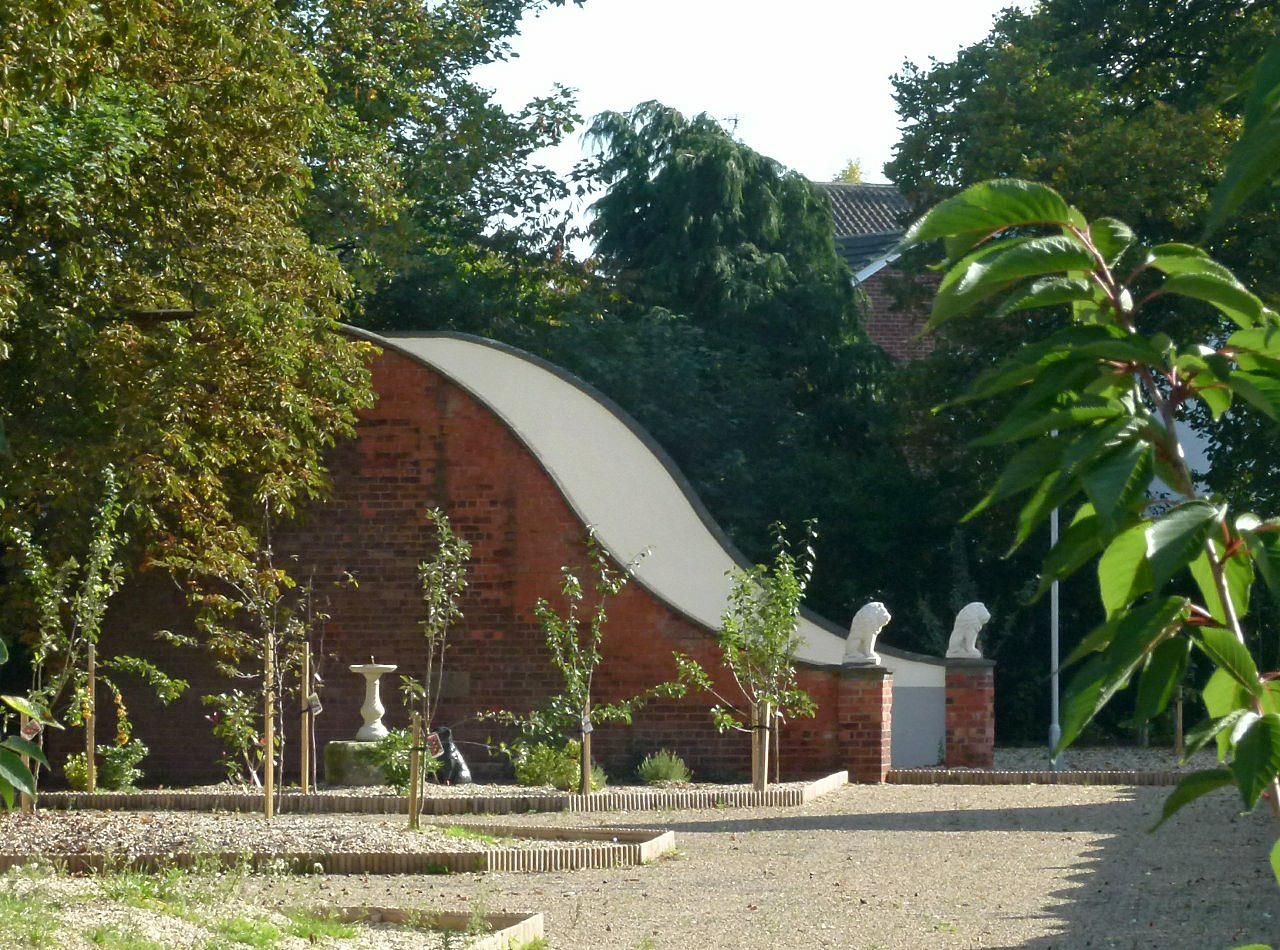
Rugby Fives Court, Grade II listed War Memorial dedicated to Capt William Eyre

In addition to the main memorial in The Square, there are other war memorials in the town. For example, the Sevastopol Cannon in neighbouring Cannon Square is a memorial to those killed in the Crimean War. A window in the south aisle of St Swithun's church (by Charles Eamer Kempe) was erected in memory of the Sherwood Rangers who fell in the Second Boer War, being unveiled in December 1903. The tablet below contains the following inscription: "To the glory of God, and to the Memory of those of the Sherwood Rangers Imperial Yeomanry who died for their Sovereign and Country in South Africa, 1900-1902" and after the names: "This Window was dedicated by their friends". In St Swithun's is also a set of oak boards, naming the 205 fallen members of the Parish from the First World War.

In St Saviour's Church there is a memorial to the 65 men of the parish killed in the First World War. In the churchyard of All Hallows’ Church in Ordsall is a carved granite cross based on St Columb's Cross in Cornwall. The inscription is in lead letters and reads: "1914-1918/ 1939-1945/ In Proud Remembrance Of Those Who Did Not Return." No names are given. This is a replacement (1951) for an earlier wooden cross, and is Grade II listed. There is also a memorial window in All Hallows’ church. Fives Court is a Grade II listed monument of the Rugby Fives type, but without the usual back wall, and was built at the former King Edward VI school site by the mother of William Eyre, a former pupil who died in the First World War. The plaque reads: "In Memory Of Capt. William Eyre; Who Died Of Wounds; August 19th 1916; Their Name Liveth Forever More." Bassetlaw Council notes that the year of death is incorrect (it should read 1915).

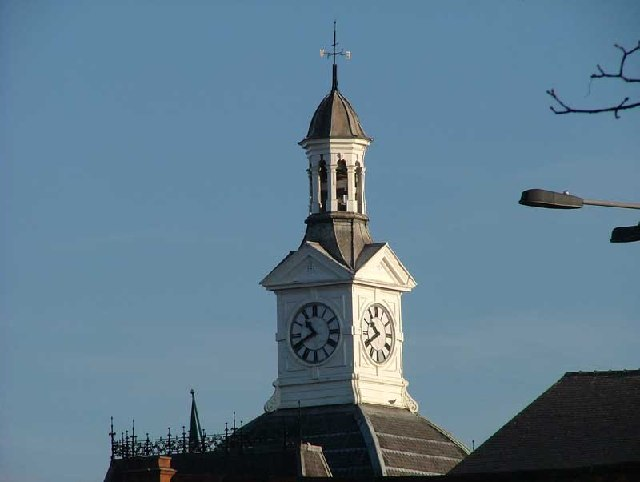
The clock tower on Retford Town Hall

==== Town Hall ====
Retford has had two known moot halls, and two town halls (including the current building). The earliest known moot hall dated from 1388. The building was in the old market square, North and East of The Square. Like many buildings in Retford, the moot hall was likely badly damaged in the Great Fire of Retford, as it was replaced in 1528. According to Piercy, by 1754 it was in such a poor state of repair that the corporation decided to demolish it and replace it with a new town hall designed in the neoclassical style by Messrs White and Watson. This 1755 town hall was demolished in 1868 because it had become an obstruction to traffic.

It was then decided to move the town hall to a new site on the south side of The Square. The current town hall was designed in the Italianate style by Bellamy and Hardy and dates from 1868.

=== Cannon Square ===
Just across from the Market Square is Cannon Square which has St Swithun's Church and a cannon captured from the Russians during the Siege of Sevastopol at the end of the Crimean War in 1856. The cannon, supporting plinth, lamp arch and iron posts with chains are all listed (Grade II). The cannon arrived in Retford in April 1858 by rail. It was given the name ‘The Earl of Aberdeen’ and was officially unveiled on 17 February 1859 by Gunner Cole (of the Royal Artillery). It was removed during the scrap drive of the Second World War, but was rescued by Alderman Alfred Wilson. The cannon was reinstated after the Second World War, set on a new wooden gun carriage, being officially unveiled on 29 March 1950 by the Mayor of Retford, Councillor T. Richmond.

In 2006 the Sebastopol Cannon was taken away to be restored through funds raised by the Retford Civic Society and on 16 September it was re-installed and a day of celebration was held to re-enact the original arrival of the cannon in 1858. The Retford Civic Society had a replica cannon built especially for the occasion and it was paraded through the town as part of the celebration.

In 2019 The Crimea Memorial was sited in the exhibition cupboards in Retford Town Hall. It records the names and regiments of 24 local men who served in the Crimean War (1854–56).

=== King's Park ===
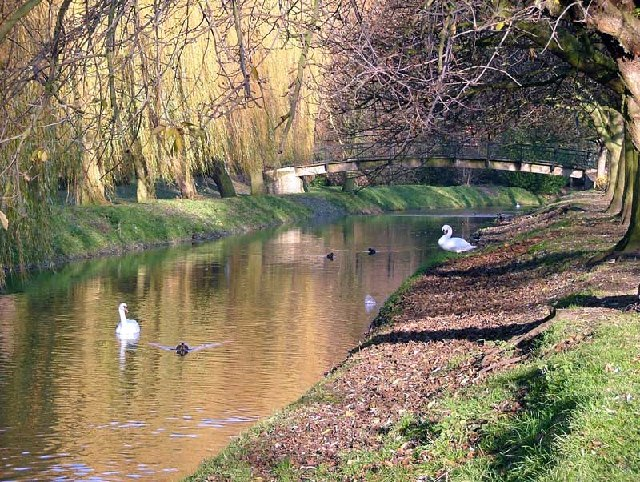
Bridge over River Idle in Kings Park

Kings' Park was opened on 29 June 1938, to commemorate not only the reign of King George V, but also the Coronation year of King George VI. The site for the original park occupies the land from Chancery Lane to the River Idle and was donated by Mrs M Huntsman of West Retford Hall in 1937. A public appeal by the Borough of East Retford at the time raised £2,000 towards the estimated cost of £8,000 (equivalent to £763,000 in 2025) to develop the park.

In 1960 a further donation of land by R H Williamson to the west of the River Idle allowed for an extension to the park within the former grounds of the historic West Retford Hall, which dates from 1699 and still stands outside the north-west boundary of the park.

Kings Park has received many awards, including winning the prestigious Britain's Best Park competition in the Midlands region (2007). It also received the Green Flag Award in both 2008 and 2009, and was voted the UK's fifth-favourite park in 2014 in the People's Choice Vote. It is described as a 'jewel in the crown' by Bassetlaw council.

The Park now covers some 10 hectares on either side of the Idle River, just off the town centre. In addition to formal gardens, it contains large areas of grassland suitable for ball games and picnics, a children's water play area, bowling greens, tennis courts, skate park, children's play ground, a performance stage, rose gardens, wildlife gardens and public conveniences.

=== Sloswicke’s Hospital ===
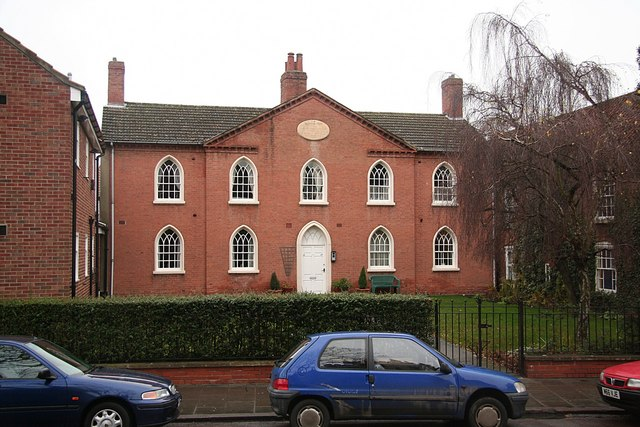
Sloswicke's hospital in Retford

Sloswicke's Hospital is a Grade II* listed building founded in 1657 from money left in Richard Sloswicke's will to found almshouses "for the maintenance of six poore old men of good carriage and behaviour to the end of the world." The present building dates from 1806; an additional pair of houses being added in 1819.

=== Trinity Hospital ===
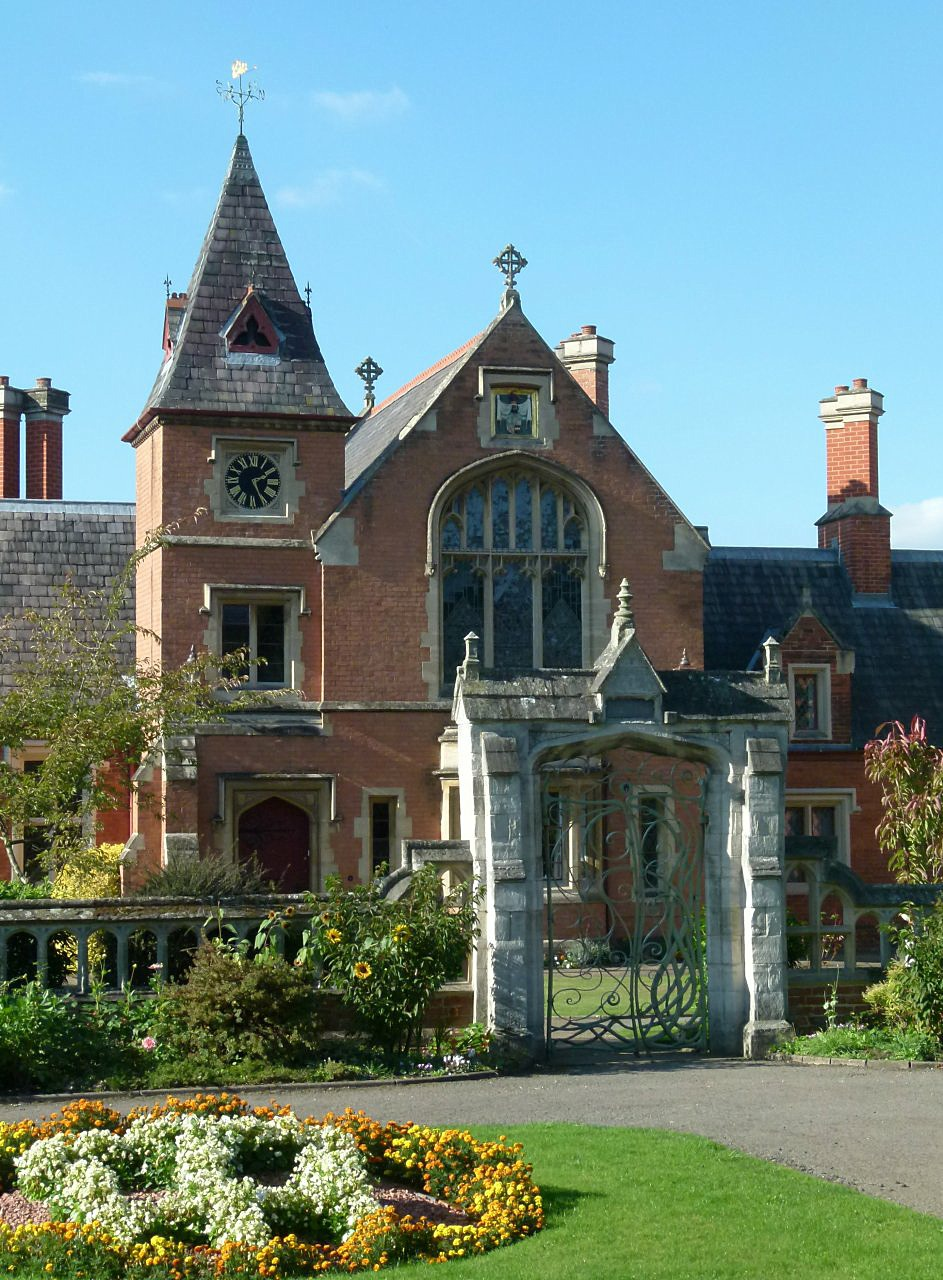
Trinity Hospital Retford

Trinity Hospital Retford is a Grade II listed alms house, set in gardens off Hospital Road. It was established over 340 years ago through the will of John Darrell. The current building on Hospital Road was designed by Edward Blore with 1872 additions.

=== Corporation Almshouses, Union Street ===
Consisting of a terrace of nine almshouses, which were built for £1,100 in 1823 for women of the town.

=== Amcott House ===
A Grade II* listed 18th century townhouse on Grove Street, which was rebuilt in its current brick and slate style by Retford M.P. Wharton Amcott around 1780. Previously, a 17th-century house belonging to the Wharton family stood on the site. Inside the current building are original features such as ornamental plasterwork ceilings and a wrought-iron staircase. From the 1870s until the 1930s the house belonged to the Pegler family, founders of the Northern Rubber Company. The building was bought by the former East Retford Rural District Council following Stephen Pegler's death and used as council offices. In 1983 it became the site of the Bassetlaw Museum.

=== Other buildings of note ===
The town does not have any Grade I listed buildings (the highest level of protection), but has six Grade II* and 123 Grade II listed buildings.

=== Spa Common ===
There were originally two commons in Retford - Spa Common and Far Common. Today only Spa Common remains, which is located behind Carolgate, adjacent to the Chesterfield Canal.

Retford sits on an Artesian aquifer – with rain water filtering through the Bunter sandstone. Before mains water was established, most houses had their own wells or used communal wells. One of these wells was in the North East corner of what came to be known as Spa Common. The water from this well developed a reputation for being able to cure various ailments whether drunk or used to wash in. An article in The Retford Times newspaper (5 July 1957) that was compiled from the notes of the historian, John Piercy, noted that he had personally tried the water and said it was red in colour and tasted of ink.

J.C. Short MD, writing in 1734, says that at that time the water on Spa Common bubbled to the surface inside a handsome freestone basin which itself was enclosed in a pleasant, decorated building shaped like a pyramid. He says that the red colour of the water was probably the result of iron oxide, and that it developed a white scum on the surface when left standing, due to the presence of gypsum.

The building mentioned by Short was later demolished by John Kirke and John Hutchinson, according to Piercy, before Robert Hudson re-opened the well. This building was also subsequently demolished and today there is no trace of the spa on the Common.

== Religion ==
Retford and its rural district contain a large number of historic churches. The area has a strong nonconformist tradition. Every English-speaking nonconformist church in the world can trace its origins back to this area.

=== St Michael the Archangel ===
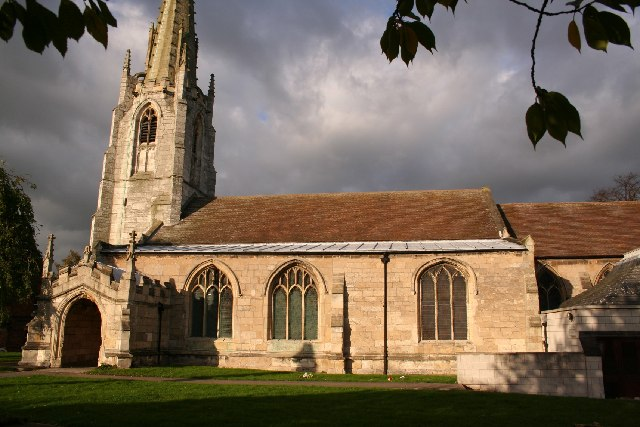
St Michael's, West Retford

The limestone built, Grade II* listed St Michael the Archangel church, West Retford was dedicated in 1227 and sits on an elevation on Rectory Road. The oldest part of the church is the south aisle and the chapel dedicated to Oswald of Northumbria. Its outstanding feature is the octagonal spire on a square tower (a 'broach' spire) which is said to be an exact, early 14th century replica of the spire of St Michael at Rouen in Normandy. At that time, Lincoln Cathedral was served by Norman priests from Rouen, and as the Manor of West Retford was among the Manors granted to Roger-de-Buesli, it is almost certain that this and other churches in Nottinghamshire were designed and built by Norman architects from Rouen.

Originally, the spire was surmounted by an iron cross, but in 1855 a severe gale damaged the tip of the spire and the cross was replaced by the current weather vane. It is the crocketted spire and tower that was referred to by Pugin as "a poem in stone" and by Nikolaus Pevsner (1979) as "remarkable". There are six bells in the tower, the largest tenor bell weighing 9cwt in A Flat is dated to 1619 and is inscribed "Jesus be our speed", the 5th bell was originally cast in 1620 and recast in 1884 by Mr Taylor of Loughborough at the cost of £200 raised by public subscription. There is an inscription on this bell that reads "Fili Dei Misere Mei" – "Son of God have Mercy on me". The other four bells were cast in the 19th century.

St Oswald's chapel is the oldest part of the church. There is a carved statue of St Oswald in a niche on one of the pillars in the south aisle, which was placed there in the 19th century. The church was significantly restored in 1863 by notable Gothic Revival architect James Fowler. The window above the altar depicts St Michael and was designed by the architect William Butterfield in memory of the Rev Charles Butterfield, rector of West Retford parish from 1857 to 1866. In the small chapel at the end of the north aisle, also known as the 'Mary chapel', there is a reredos by Sir Ninian Comper.

Within the grounds of St Michael's is a stone known as the ‘preaching cross’. It is thought this could be an old boundary cross (Stapleton) or a plague stone (Percy), being the West Retford equivalent to the Broadstone. During the Georgian and Victorian periods this stone sat on the top of the boundary wall before being moved to its current location in the late-19th or early-20th century.

=== St Swithun's ===
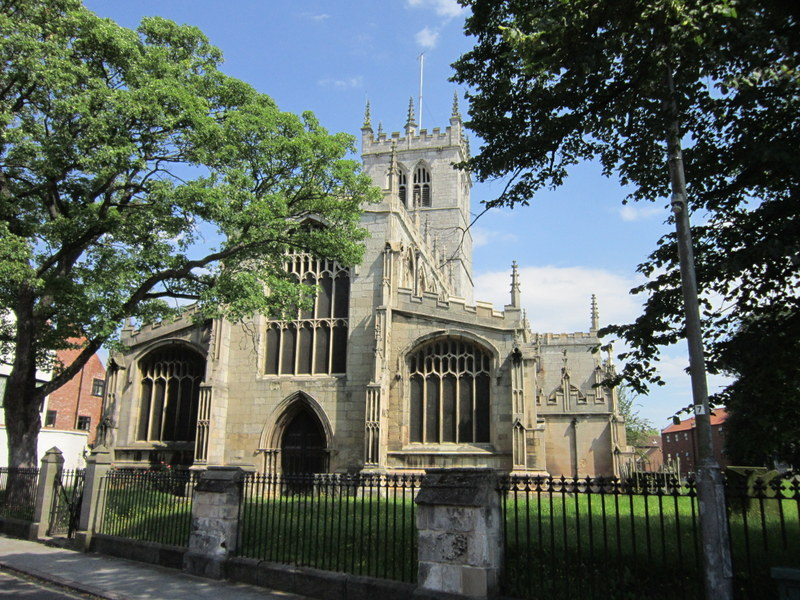
St Swithun's, East Retford

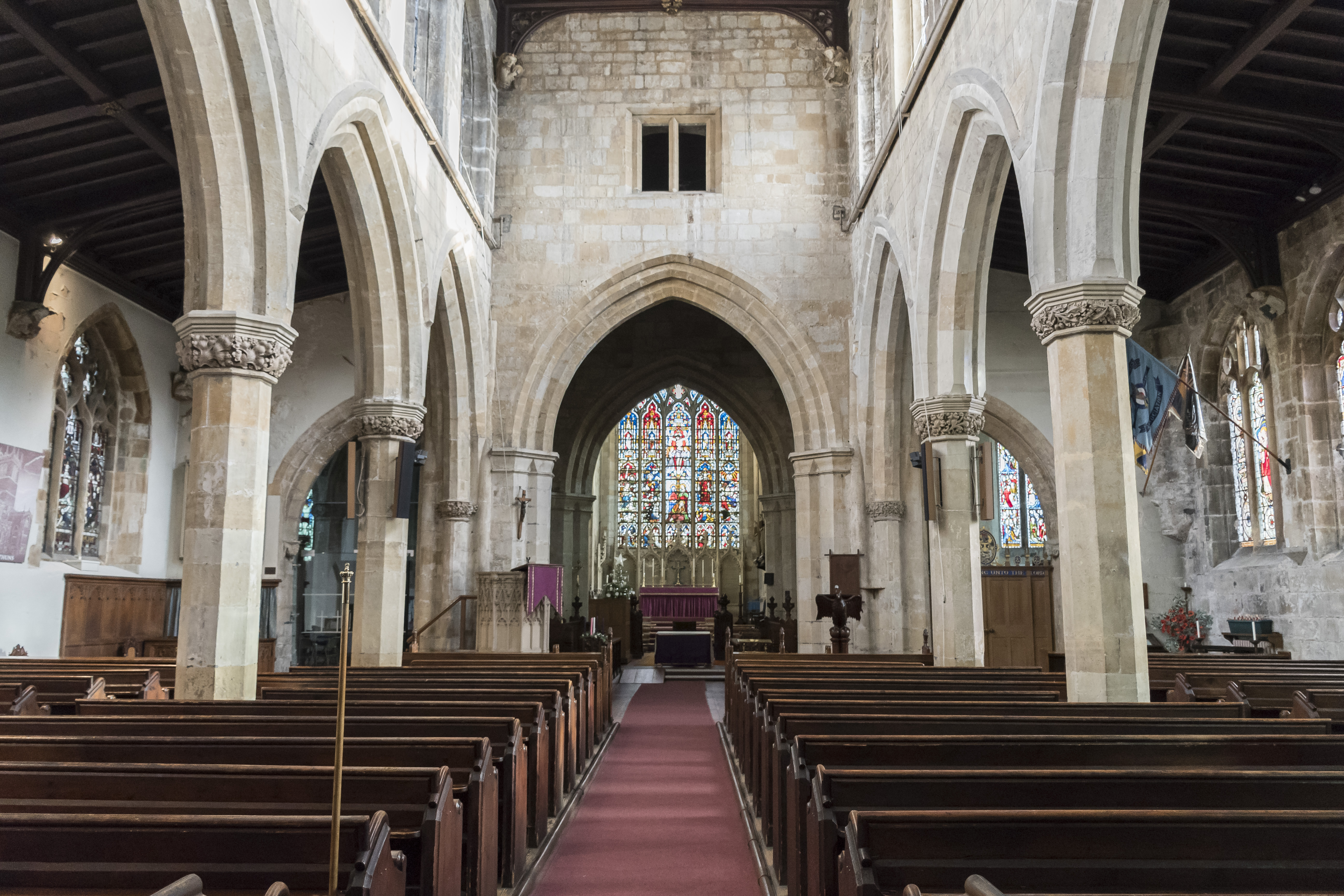
Interior of St Swithun's, East Retford

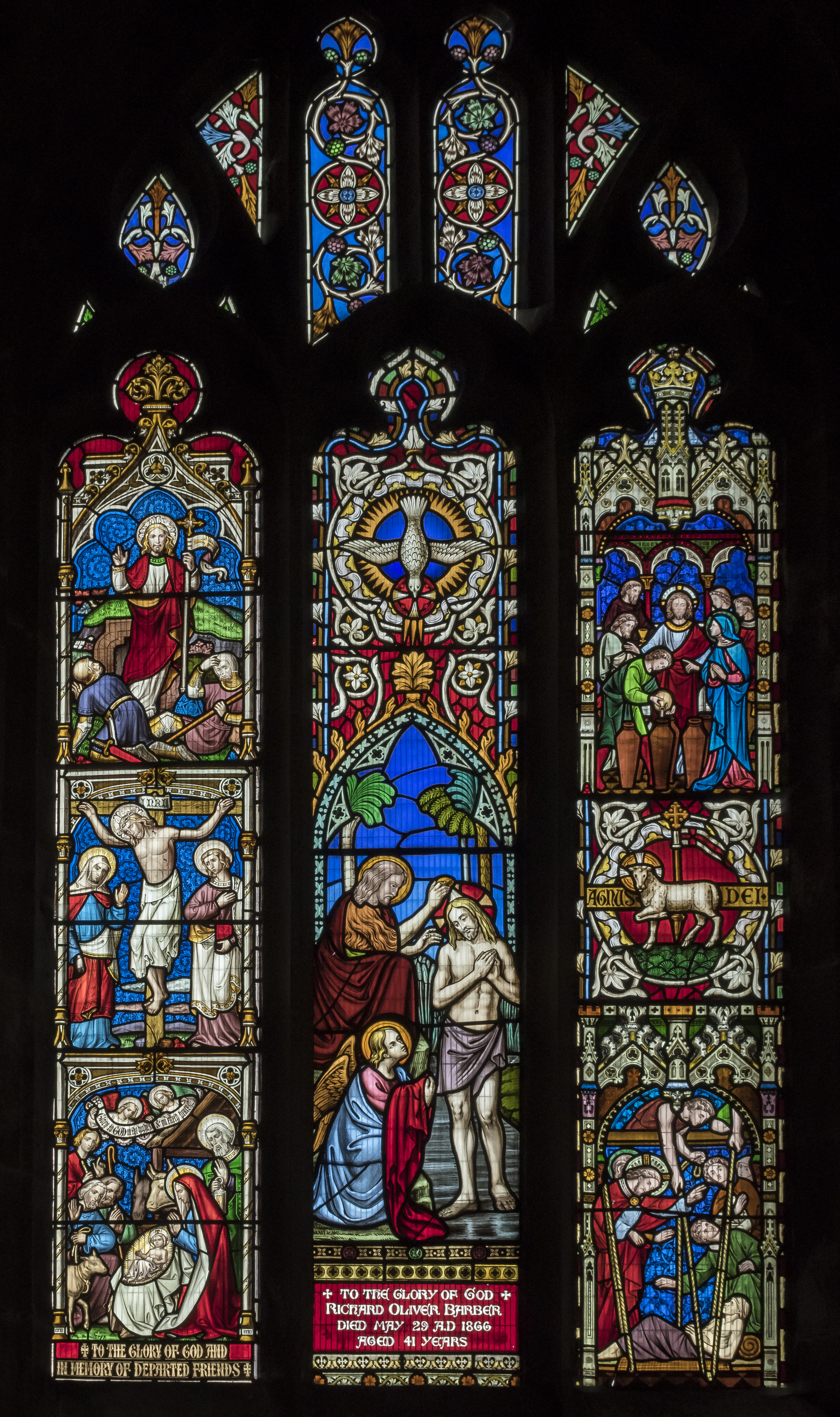
Stained glass window in St Swithun's, East Retford

St Swithun's Church, East Retford is a Grade II* listed church in East Retford that is dedicated to St Swithun and founded in 1258. The church is located in the centre of town between Churchgate and Chapelgate.

St Swithun's is of cruciform shape, now mainly of perpendicular architecture, but still preserving in its south and west doorways, and in the tracery of some of its windows, marks of earlier styles. In 1528 there was a great fire in Retford which damaged the church. In 1535, we learn that: "Where sumtyme were iiii chauntries which now er in decaye by reason they er consumed wt. fyer." The tower and chancel collapsed in 1651 and were rebuilt in 1658. The current building is therefore largely the work of restorers of 1658, 1854-5 and 1905.

The church has a square, battlemented tower, containing a clock and 10 bells. The oldest, virtually untouched, part is the north transept, although it has now been transformed into a chapel as a war memorial. The tower is supported by four massive arches and the nave and aisles are separated by arcades of five bays. There is a stone pulpit, an eagle lectern in oak, and a large organ erected in 1841. In the north transept is an incised slab to Henry Smyth (d 1496) and Sir Whatton Amcotts (d 1807) by William Kinnard, architect. The Victorian stained glass includes work by Clayton and Bell, Charles Eamer Kempe, Michael O’Connor, Hardman & Co, William Wailes and George Shaw.

The figure over the southern door is locally said to be of St Swithun, but according to Kidson is of a bishop. He says the figure was brought from a dissolved monastery in Portugal and was given to the Church, and placed in its present position, in about 1895.

The British Museum contains several architectural drawings of East Retford Church by Samuel Hieronymous Grimm. These include a general view of the exterior, and a drawing of the tracery of the east window. There are also drawings by Thomas Kerrich (1748–1828) including a drawing of a window which used to be in the Chancel, but which no longer exists. John Buckler (1770–1851) made several drawings of the church, including one of the figure in the vesica piscis, at the beginning of the nineteenth century.

=== St Joseph ===
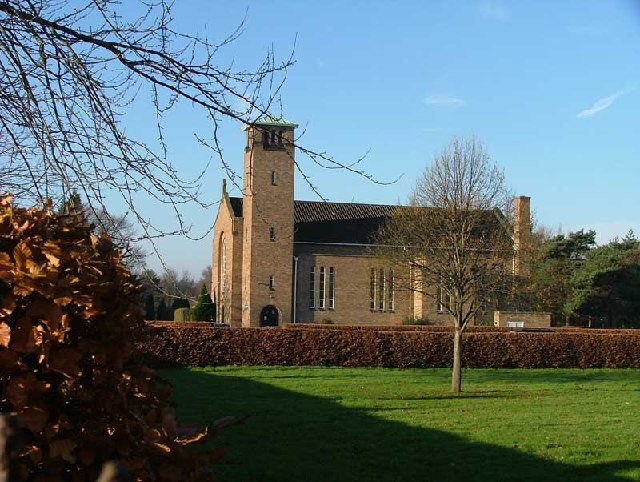
St Joseph Roman Catholic Church, Retford

Catholics mainly worshipped in homes following the reformation and up until the 20th century, although demand for a Catholic church rose with an increase in Irish workers and Italian immigrants in the 19th and early 20th centuries. In 1895 a piece of land was purchased on the corner of Queen Street and Pelham Road and what came to be known locally as the "tin chapel" was constructed. A nearby house on Pelham Road was used by the priest.

As the Catholic community continued to expand it was decided to build a bigger church and land was purchased on the Babworth Road. The present Catholic church - St Joseph's - opened in 1959 and was designed by Ernest Bower Norris in modern Romanesque design, incorporating Art Deco elements. The church was later reordered in 1968 by renowned Modernist architect Gerard Goalen, at which time a large sculpture by Steven Sykes was introduced. St Joseph's is prominently located on Babworth Road and its campanile serves as a local landmark. In its Conservation Plan, Bassetlaw Council says: "The bell tower with copper roof is one of the most prominent architectural features within the entire Conservation Area." Next to the church is St Joseph's Catholic Primary School.

=== All Hallows, Ordsall ===
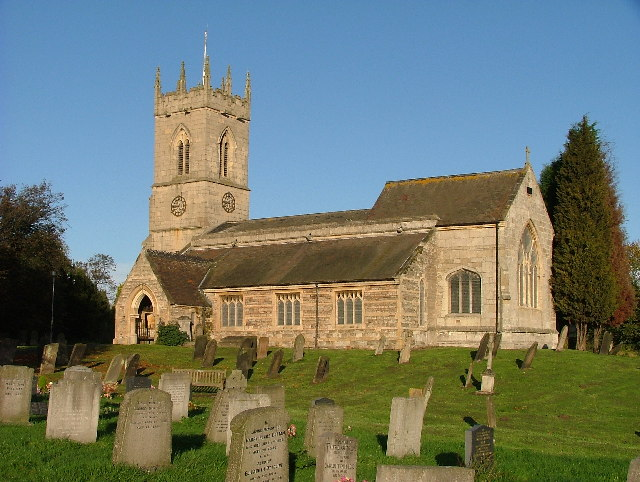
All Hallows Church, Ordsall, Retford

Ordsall is a village that is now a suburb of Retford. Its church All Hallows is a Grade II* listed building. The first recorded rector is in 1277. The current building dates from that period but was rebuilt in the 19th century by TC Hine of Nottingham. The church has a short, square tower with diagonal buttresses that is thought to date from the 15th century. The upper parts of the tower had to be repaired in 1823 after it was struck by lightning.

The church's east window is by Camm Brothers of Smethwick and dates from 1877, as is the window in the north aisle east (1881). In the chancel there is a window by James Powell and Sons (Flint memorial, 1923) and another by Charles Eamer Kempe (Hall memorial, 1905). There are a number of unusual brass plates in the south aisle, dating from the 17th and 18th centuries. In the north aisle is a memorial made of Nottinghamshire alabaster with kneeling figure between Corinthian columns (c 1600–20).

=== St Saviour's, Retford ===
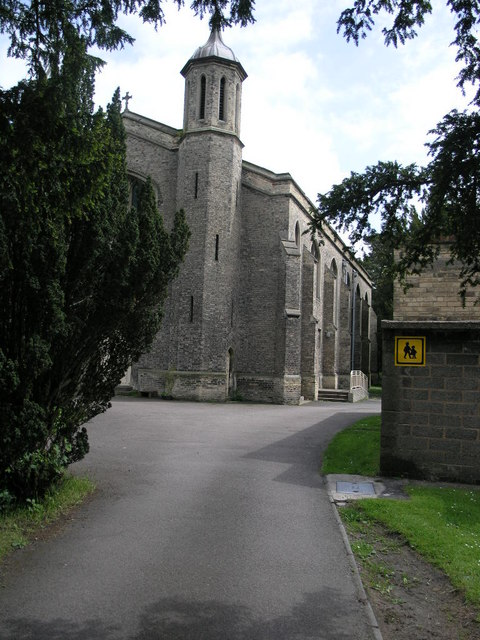
St Saviour's, Retford

St Saviour's is a Grade II listed church in Retford at the top of Moorgate Hill. It was designed by the Lincoln architect Edward James Willson, FSA and was completed in 1829. It was the first major project by Willson and cost £4,000.

At the West End of the building are a pair of octagonal towers which have ogee shaped, lead covered, caps. The church is built in yellow brick, which has weathered to dark grey. There is a brass plaque at the church which says the following: "This first stone of the new chapel dedicated to the Saviour, and containing silver and copper coins of the reign of George the Fourth, was laid on the second day of June, AD 1828, by Henry Clark Hutchinson Esq., of Welham." The church was restored and repewed in 1877–78. In 1936 there was a reduction in seats and the removal of the side galleries. A major reordering of the inside of the church was carried out in 2001, removing the oak pews and replacing them with individual seats.

The building seems to be far bigger than was required. BJ Biggs in 'Looking at Old Retford' (p14) notes: "There were 1,040 sittings and it is interesting to speculate whether they were ever fully occupied. At the time of the census of 1851 there was an average morning congregation of 300 adults and 123 children, and an average evening attendance of 400."

=== Methodist Chapel ===
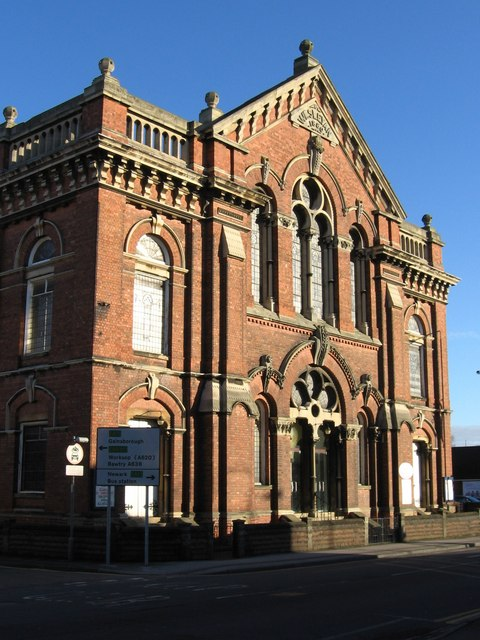
Grove Street Methodist Church

"From whichever direction it is approached this building dominates the skyline".

— BJ Biggs, Looking at Old Retford

The current Grade II listed Methodist chapel in Grove Street dates from 1880 and was built by Bellamy and Hardy, who were also the architects of Retford Town Hall. Its listing states that the chapel retains a high quality of architectural and artistic embellishment in both the external and internal detail. The oval galleries are an architectural expression of distinctive worshipping practice and there has been minimal alteration to the original fabric or fittings. The chapel contains flooring laid in the early 20th century, an example of the terrazzo and mosaic craft of Italian immigrant craftsmen.

=== Other places of worship in Retford ===
- The Bridge Church, Bridgegate, Retford
- The Well, Hospital Road, Reford – a Baptist church
- St Alban's Church, London Road – a Grade II listed, stone-built Edwardian church that fell into disuse and was gutted by fire in 2008
- Salvation Army, Exchange Street, Retford
- Hallcroft Methodist Church, Retford
- All Saints, Babworth – a Grade I listed church on the outskirts of Retford in the village of Babworth

=== Nonconformists ===
Pilgrim Fathers

The Pilgrim Fathers, a name commonly applied to early Separatist settlers of the Plymouth Colony in present-day Massachusetts originated from the villages of Babworth and Scrooby on the outskirts of Retford between 1586 and 1605. At the time they were known as 'Separatists' and only a few left Nottinghamshire; most stayed to try and reform the church from within. An example of a prominent Retford family who were Nonconformists but chose to remain are the Denmans.

Retford's Bassetlaw Museum was awarded £776,000 (including £450,000 of National Lottery Funding) in 2018 to create a gallery dedicated to telling the story of the Pilgrim Fathers. The gallery was opened by Dr. Jeremy Bangs, director of The Leiden American Pilgrim Museum in the Netherlands, the Lord Lieutenant of Nottinghamshire, Sir John Peace, and chairman of Bassetlaw District Council, Cllr Debbie Merryweather in 2019. 53°19′20.45″N 0°56′20.57″W

The Society of Friends

Retford played a role in the early history of the Society of Friends (commonly known as Quakers). In 1652(?) James Parnell converted to the faith after walking 150 miles from Retford to Carlisle and visiting George Fox in gaol. Parnell had been born in Retford and attended the King Edward VI Grammar School. He became a well known preacher, writer and advocate of Quakerism before dying in Colchester in 1656 at the age of 19(?). He was regarded as being a martyr and became known as 'The Boy Martyr'.

Methodism

Retford was involved in the early history of Methodism, with John Wesley preaching in the town square in 1779 and again in Bridgegate in 1786 when he was 83 years old.

However, Methodism was said to have been introduced to the town by a Scot named John MacFarlane in 1776. When Wesley visited in 1779 "a mob of local rowdies" planned a warm reception, led by a certain John Willey. In the end, because of MacFarlane and his supporters, this was limited to throwing a bad egg, which missed Wesley but hit his sister. She was said to have retaliated with a torrent of abuse, which made the crowd laugh.

Retford's first Methodist chapel was opened in 1779, but was deemed too small for the crowd expected for Wesley's second visit to Retford. According to Wesley's journal he preached first at the New Inn, afterwards at Newark, and in the evening at Retford. Biggs (1967) records that there is a tablet in the wall of a house in Bridgegate, marking the spot where Wesley preached under a pear tree in an orchard just over the Idle in the parish of West Retford. Moss (1908) notes that the inscription states that in an orchard on this site on the evening of 24 June 1786, a sermon was preached by the Rev. John Wesley, M.A., from the words 'I saw the small and great stand before God'.

Biggs (1968) says that John MacFarlane fell on hard times in later life but refused a place in the alms house, Trinity Hospital, because it would mean he would have to attend West Retford Church. He said he would not "sell his soul to the devil for a place". Instead, he entered the workhouse, where he was known as "Johnny Mac-farthing". Friends conducted him to the stone-laying of the new Methodist Chapel in Newgate Street (now Grove Street), where he laid a stone. He died in 1824 and was buried in the Methodist cemetery surrounding the chapel.

== Economy ==
=== Current economy of Retford ===
Retford is an important commercial centre for the local area, with large supermarkets, many independent shops and a market every Thursday, Friday and Saturday. In 2013, Retford's town centre had an empty shop rate of only 9%, 5% less than the national average.

Retford has a strong economy, mainly consisting of services with some light industry. Retail, health, manufacturing, education and accommodation are major employers. There is also a high representation of arts & recreational, finance & insurance jobs.Since the 1980s many of its long-established manufacturing and engineering companies such as Jenkins Newell Dunford (engineering) and Bridon Ropes (wire rope) have closed, as the economy became more services-based.

The town has a very low unemployment rates compared to the national average. In 2018, Nottinghamshire County Council calculated unemployment in Retford as follows: East Retford South (1.8%), East Retford North (1.6%), East Retford East (1.5%), East Retford West (1.3%). This compares to 1.7% for Bassetlaw as a whole and 4.4% nationally. According to the ONS, 61% of people work locally (2011 Census ONS), which is far lower than neighbouring areas. Strong transport links mean that many Retford workers commute to neighbouring towns and cities such as Sheffield, Doncaster, Mansfield and Lincoln; some commute to London.

Brewing was traditionally an important industry in Bassetlaw with brewers such as Worksop & Retford Brewing Company. Retford was also an important hop market. This tradition was revived by a number of microbreweries based in or near the town including Broadstone Brewery (1999–2006), Idle Valley Brewing (2014–2018), Harrisons Brewery (2018–), Pheasantry Brewery in East Markham (2012–) and Springhead in Laneham (1990–).

Important employers include the specialist aerospace components manufacturer Icon, which employs 200+ people on Thrumpton Lane, Retford. Icon evolved from The Northern Rubber Company, which was established in 1871 by Alfred Pegler. Langley Holdings is based in Retford and owns more than 80 subsidiaries, including Piller, Druck Chemie, Oakdale Homes, Protran and Claudius Peters. Langley's subsidiaries produce components for the automotive industry, parts for Airbus wings, and supply back-up power for data centres amongst other activities. In 2012 Langley Holdings bought the sheet-fed operations of German printing press company Manroland Sheetfed out of insolvency for £140 million.

=== Historical economy of Retford ===
Retford did not experience the large-scale industrial growth of nearby towns and remained primarily a rural market town. Historically, it traded agricultural produce, but has also been a producer of hats, sail-cloth, rope, sack bags, paper and leather.

In 1788 Major John Cartwright, the older brother of Edmund Cartwright inventor of the power loom, built The Revolution Mill on Spital Hill. The mill was a steam-powered wool spinning and weaving mill employing around 600 people. The ambitious enterprise, however, failed a few years later and the site and machinery were eventually sold at great loss in 1805. Only one building survives.

Hezekiah Clark of Derby came to work in Cartwright's mill in the 1780s as a dyer. After the Mill failed he set up as a dyer in Retford in 1798, resulting in the business Clarks of Retford, which gave its name to Dyers Court. The company eventually became known for its dry cleaning and laundry services, and had 138 shops before it ceased trading in the 1980s. The business is commemorated by a mural in Dyer's Court.

The Bolham Paper Making Company made glazed papers, shop papers, boards, boxboards; other new paper mills were built in the mid-19th century, including a mill on Albert Road (1867). Foundries and iron works were also established. The Beehive Works was built in Thrumpton in 1873 and William Bradshaw set up his Carr Foundry in Albert Road which specialised in heating and rainwater pipes, gutters, stoves, fireplaces and general engineering castings. The late nineteenth century also saw the introduction of new technologies when the Northern Rubber Company was created by Alfred Pegler in 1871. The factory's proximity to the junction of two important railways helped it prosper.

The agricultural land surrounding Retford was an important area for hop growing from the seventeenth century onwards. According to DCD Pocock, "Retford, as the most northerly hop fair in the country, was of special importance until the breaking down of traditional economic watersheds and marketing limits with the advent of rail transport". These North Clay hops (named after the North Clay Division of which Retford is part) were considered much stronger than Kentish hops and were used in the original Nottingham Brewery's bitter beers. At the beginning of the 19th Century 11,000 acres of hops were grown, which had dwindled to 29 acres by 1880. Hops are no longer cultivated in the area.

=== The role of women in Retford's economy ===
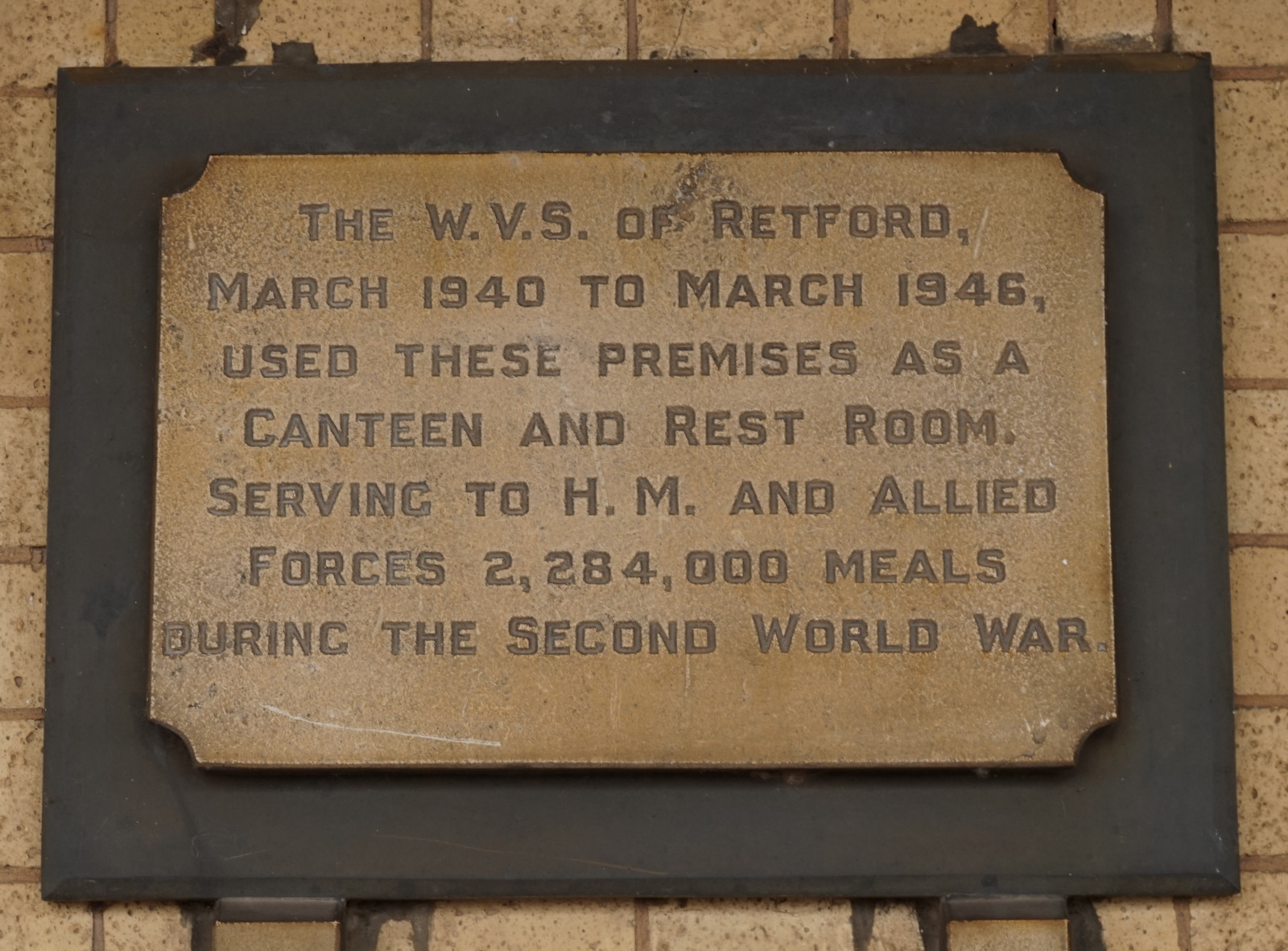
WVS Plaque at Retford Station

Women have played an important role in the economy of Nottinghamshire particularly in certain industries (such as lace making and farming). In Retford women were always economically active and some businesses relied heavily on female labour (such as Clark's of Retford).

Until the Black Death, most beer in the UK was produced by women brewers (called 'brewsters'). Brewing was an important industry in Nottinghamshire from hop growing, to brewing to selling beer. Nottinghamshire women have had considerable involvement in all aspects of the brewing trade, with many historic Retford pubs being recorded as having female managers.

Women-owned businesses were also relatively common in Retford. For example, Piercy mentions in 1828 that the Post Office in Grove Street is run by the post mistress Miss Elizabeth Barker. Three years later, White's 1831 directory notes it is run by Mrs Elizabeth Taylor. The postal service seems to have historically involved women workers in Retford. Moss (1908) noted there were four deliveries of letters per day and says: "Within living memory the letters were distributed by one woman, 'Old Betty Chapman.'"

Women are recorded in the 1831 directory undertaking a number of other trades. Mary Clark and Catherine Dean were grocers; Mary Stocks was a boat owner; Mrs Jane Taylor, Frances Holliday, Susanna Slaney and Elizabeth Wilkinson were stay makers; Faith Walker was a farmer; Margaret Holderness was a bookseller; Ellen Lawrence was a shoemaker; Mary Burley was a China and Glass dealer; Ann Appleby, Ann Colbeck, Sarah Graves, Mary Penington and Susan Penington were straw hat makers; Ann Burton, Mary Chester and Jane Walker were shopkeepers. Several Retford public houses were also run by a landlady at that time.

The first female councillor on Retford Town Council was Mrs Ellen Gentle Howell, born in 1872 in Huckle, Luton, who was elected in 1926, becoming Mayoress of Retford. Not until 1951 did a woman become mayor of Retford in her own right: Mrs M E Williamson JP, who was also the Chair of Governors of Retford High School for Girls, and who became the first woman Alderman on Retford Town Council (1961). The first female magistrate in Retford was Miss Grace M Bradshaw, who sat on the Retford Borough Bench (1933) and was also appointed to the Retford County Bench in 1934. Bradshaw was also the Chairman of Governors of the County High School for Girls, Retford and secretary of the Retford Ladies Health Association.

The work of the WVS of Retford is celebrated with a plaque at Retford train station, which states that between March 1940 and March 1946 they served 2,284,000 meals to HM and Allied Forces in the canteen and rest room.

== Transport ==
=== Roads ===
Retford was historically on the Great North Road. It is now bypassed by the A1 trunk road and the A57 which links Retford to a number of major towns and cities, with London just over two hours away.

The East Retford bypass was built in three stages mostly along what was previously the A57, and was, announced to divert along the A57, in January 1953. Construction of the Five Lane Ends to Elkesley section, of 2.5 miles, started on 18 February 1957. The width of the road was trebled in 1957; the previous A57 had been quite a narrow road, being only 13ft wide in 1936, when the Elkesley bypass was started.

In 1957, the West Drayton diversion opened up to the B6387 near Elkesley. Also near Elkesley and Gamston is the Retford Gamston Airport. The section from Elkesley bypass to Five Lane Ends (A614 junction) at Apleyhead Wood opened in 1958, and the third section was from Five Lane Ends to north of Checker House at Ranby (A620 junction). Recent investment led to a renovation of junctions at Blyth, Great Whin Covert and Markham Moor.

Construction of the Northern Relief Road started 5 December 1975, costing £533,000, and opened on Tuesday 23 November 1976. Construction of the £2m Eastern Relief Road started in July 1980, with the Chairman of Nottinghamshire County Council, Stewart Pattinson. The northern end was at Moorgate. It was opened by Nottinghamshire County Council chairman, Mrs Joan Case, on Friday 19 June 1981. It was built by A.F. Budge.

=== Buses ===
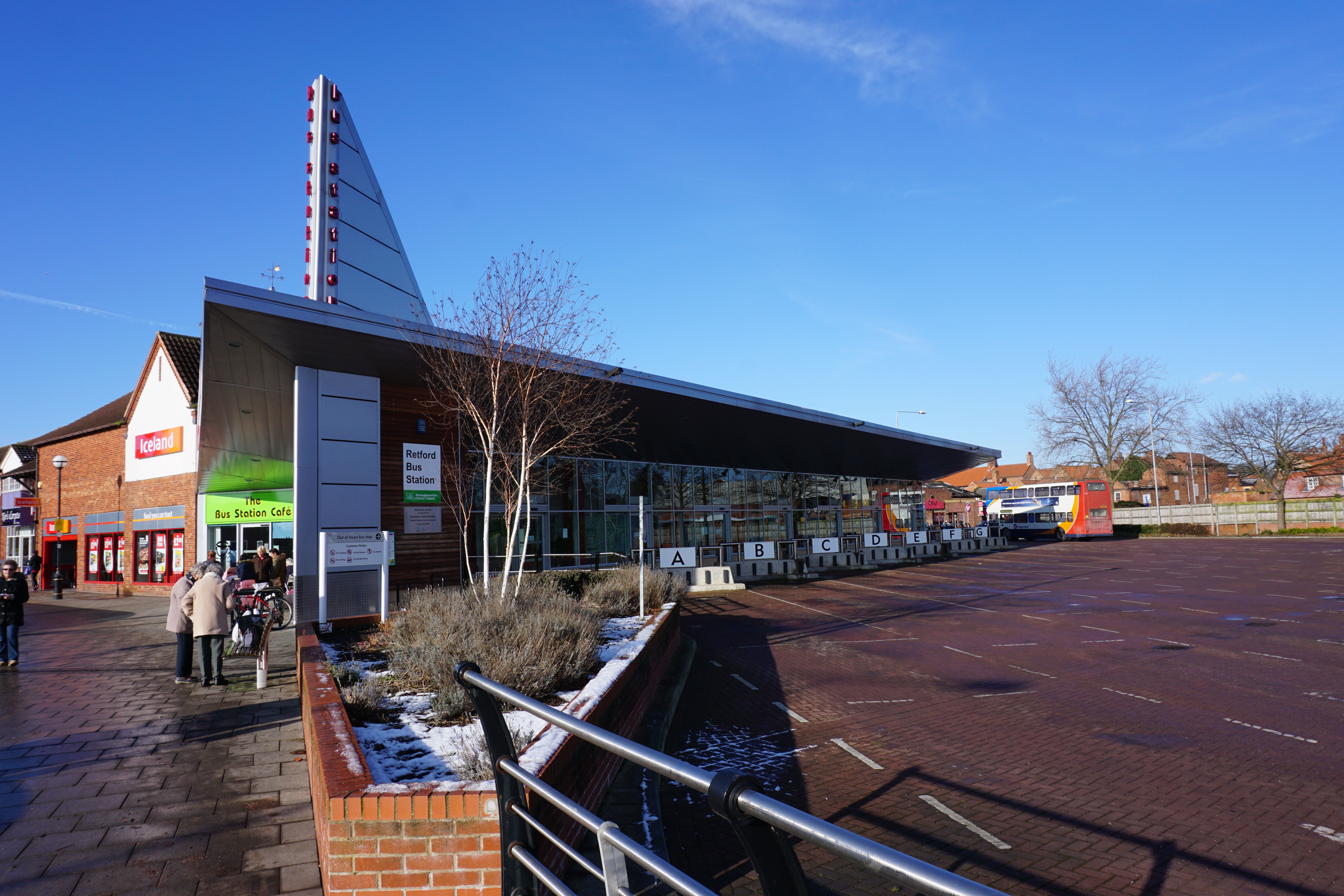
Retford bus station

The town is served by several bus operators including Stagecoach in Bassetlaw, Stagecoach in Lincolnshire and TM Travel; route destinations include Worksop, Newark, Nottingham and Doncaster.

The current bus station was built and opened on 30 July 2007, at a cost of £1.4 million, and was given a highly commended accolade in the infrastructure category of the UK Bus Awards 2008. The previous bus station, on the same site, was a collection of bus shelters, but also allowed vehicles to drive illegally through it; the new facility has new traffic controls in order to prevent this.

=== Railway ===
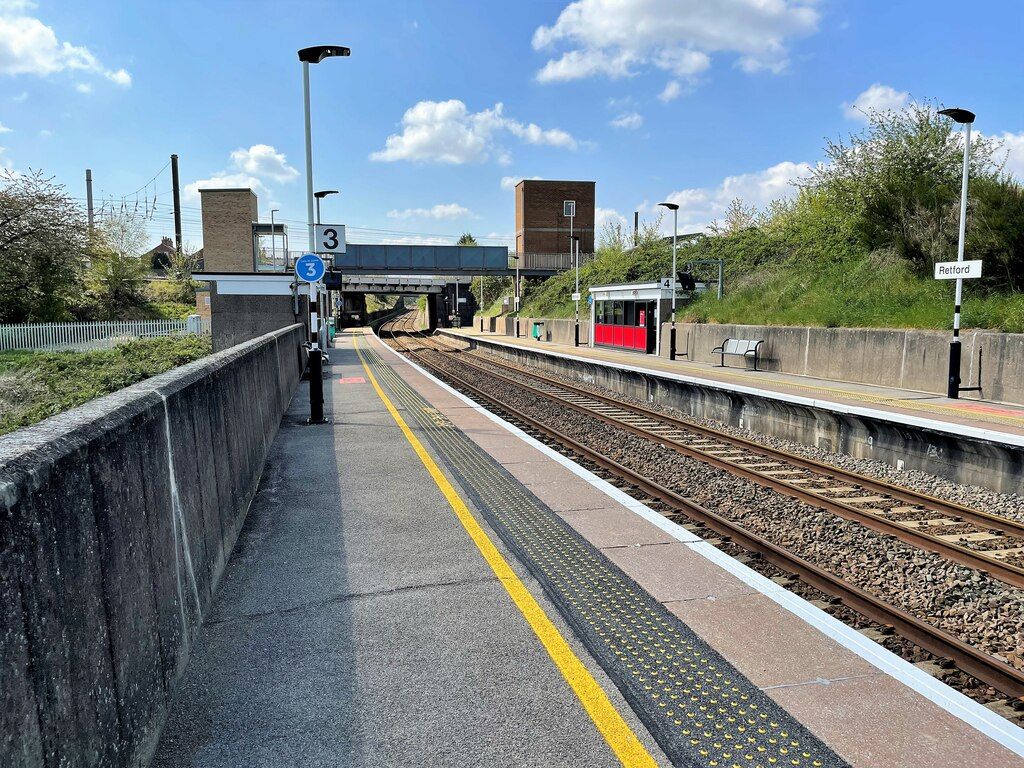
Retford railway station platform

Retford railway station is at a junction of two railway lines:

- The East Coast Main Line links London, Yorkshire and Scotland; services are operated by London North Eastern Railway and Hull Trains. Trains take from 1hr 20 minutes to London Kings Cross
- The Sheffield–Lincoln line which provides trains to Sheffield, Lincoln, Gainsborough Lea Road, Worksop, Grimsby and Cleethorpes. Services are operated by Northern Trains.

Retford station was Grade II listed by Historic England in July 2020. The buildings date from 1891 to 1892 and the reason for listing was given as: "the very rare survival of the original finishes in the dining room and refreshment room" which are said to be ornate and featuring "fine craftsmanship"; the "remarkably long and well-balanced composition in the Italianate style" of the station buildings and the "impressive" canopy over the platform; and the well-preserved plan form which make it "one of the most intact medium-sized GNR stations."

=== Water ===
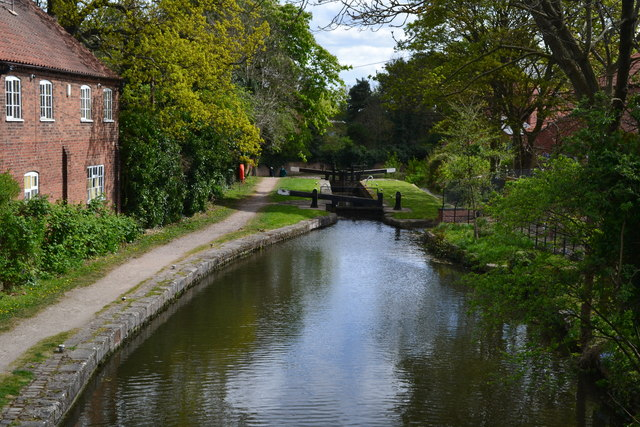
Chesterfield Canal

Retford is connected to the UK Inland Waterways network by the Chesterfield Canal designed by the engineer James Brindley and largely built under the supervision of his assistant John Varley. The canal was built to export coal, limestone and lead from Derbyshire; iron from Chesterfield; and corn, deals, timber, groceries and general merchandise into Derbyshire; it is now used for leisure purposes.

The original route proposed for the canal did not include Retford. But the headmaster of Retford Grammar School, the Reverend Seth Ellis Stevenson, began a vigorous campaign to bring the canal to Retford. In August 1769, when the first public meeting was held in Worksop to promote the canal, Brindley supported the Retford route. In January 1770, Brindley announced at a crowded meeting at the Crown Inn, Retford, a 46-mile route from Chesterfield to West Stockwith via Worksop and Retford. In 1771, an “Act for making a navigable cut, or canal, from Chesterfield, in the County of Derby, through or near Worksop and Retford, to join the River Trent at or near Stockwith in the County of Nottingham” finally received Royal Assent.

The Chesterfield Canal hit international headlines in 1978. While dredging the bottom of the canal to remove rubbish, a maintenance team pulled up a large chain which had a wooden plug attached to it. Later that day, it was noticed that a whirlpool had formed and it became evident that the section of the canal between Whitsunday Pie Lock and Retford Town Lock was losing water. Unbeknown to the workmen, but commonly known locally, the plug was an original engineering feature of the canal to allow sections to be drained for future maintenance. The water drained (as designed) harmlessly into the nearby river Idle. The accidental removal of the plug became a national and international story; it was even recorded in Lloyd's List.

Based in Retford, on the lower side of the Town Lock, is a boat club called Retford Mariners Boat Club, (R.M.B.C), which was formed in November 1978 by a group of canal enthusiasts. An early twentieth century crane situated at Retford Wharf was Grade II listed by Historic England in 1996.

=== Air ===
Retford (Gamston) Airport is a private airport, located a few miles south of Retford in the village of Gamston; it is operated by Gamston Aviation Ltd.

== Entertainment ==
=== Museum ===
Retford is home to the Bassetlaw Museum, which was created in 1983 and has a number of collections donated by people in the local area. The museum tells the history of North Nottinghamshire from its earliest people to the present day. Collection highlights include: Carlton-in-Lindrick knight, Anglo-Saxon boat and autochromes by Stephen Pegler. It was voted the Nottinghamshire Museum of the Year in 2009, following extensive renovation, and is based in the Grade II* listed Amcott House.

In 2002, the Heritage Lottery Fund gave the museum a grant of £78,000 to enable the purchase and digitisation of 20,000 negatives taken by professional photographers Edgar Welchman and Son of Grove Street, Retford between 1910 and 1960. The photograph collection at the Museum contains over 27,000 photographs of the towns and villages of North Nottinghamshire and people who lived there from about 1870 onwards. 8,000 general photographs from the museum's collections have been added to the Welchman Project images.

In 2019 The Pilgrims Gallery was added as part of a £750,000 Heritage Lottery funded project to commemorate the 400th anniversary of the Mayflower's voyage to America in 1620. The Gallery features a recreation of William Brewster's study.

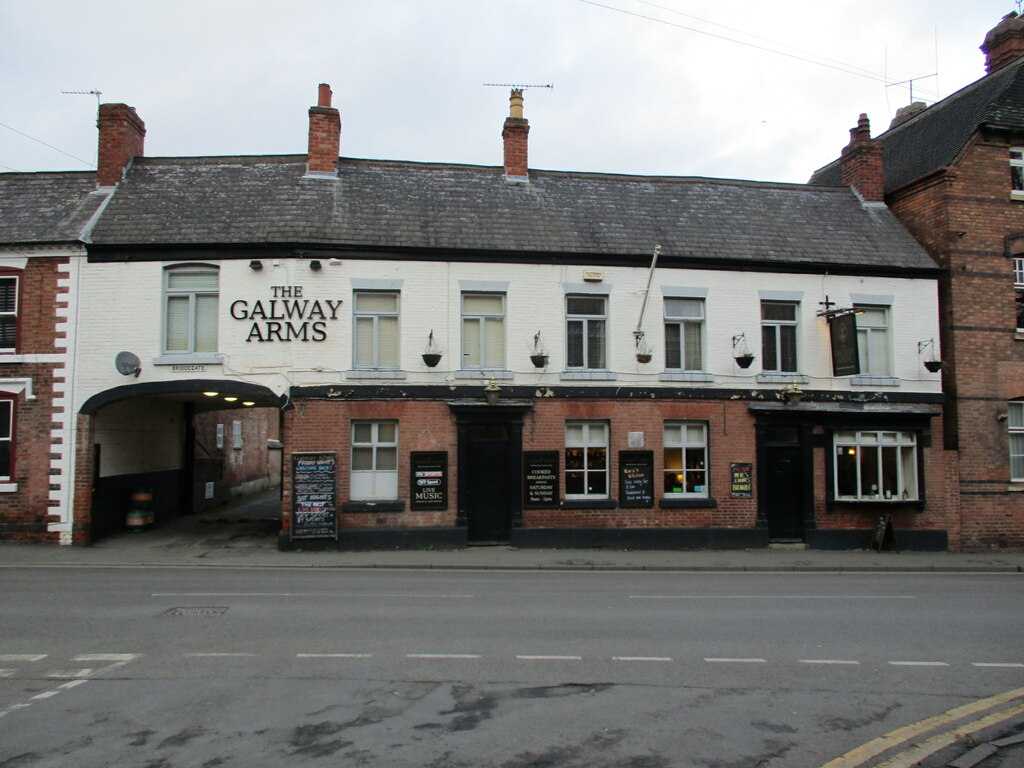
Galway Arms

=== Theatres and cinemas ===
Piercy mentions a theatre situated on "the west side, and nearly in the centre, of Carrhillgate" which was built in 1789 by Mr William Pero who purchased the ground from Sir Thomas Woolaston White. Retford now has two theatres in the town: the Grade II listed Majestic Theatre, which hosts famous entertainers, music concerts from local performers and plays, and Retford Little Theatre, a smaller theatre which hosts the Retford Little Theatre amateur drama group.

The Majestic is an Art Deco building designed by Alfred John Thraves for Cyril Getliffe as a joint cinema and theatre building on Coronation Street, Retford. It opened with a stage production of No, No, Nanette in 1927. It was closed three times, threatened with demolition and has been used as a bingo hall. In 1993 it was bought by The Retford Theatre Trust and since 1996 a small group of volunteers have restored its original features. It is now Grade II listed.

Retford also had a cinema built around 1917 called The Picture House, later The Roxy, which stood on Carolgate and was also owned by Cyril Getliffe. It was demolished in the 1960s.

The Regent Theatre was an Art Deco cinema opened in Carolgate in 1911 and renamed The Ritz in 1934. It closed in 1957 and the building became a Masonic hall in 1962.

=== Historic pubs ===
The Retford area had a thriving hops industry and traditionally a large number of pubs, because it was situated on the Great North Road. According to Cornelius Brown, a licence was granted to John Watson and his wife in 1625 to keep a tavern and sell whisky, with a payment of £3 per annum due to the king. White, in his 1831 trade directory, records 27 public houses and 11 beer houses, which had increased by 1896 to 56 Inns and 3 beer houses.

Retford's pubs have played an important part in its social, cultural and political history. For example, The Duke of Newcastle's True Blue Club met in The Turk's Head.

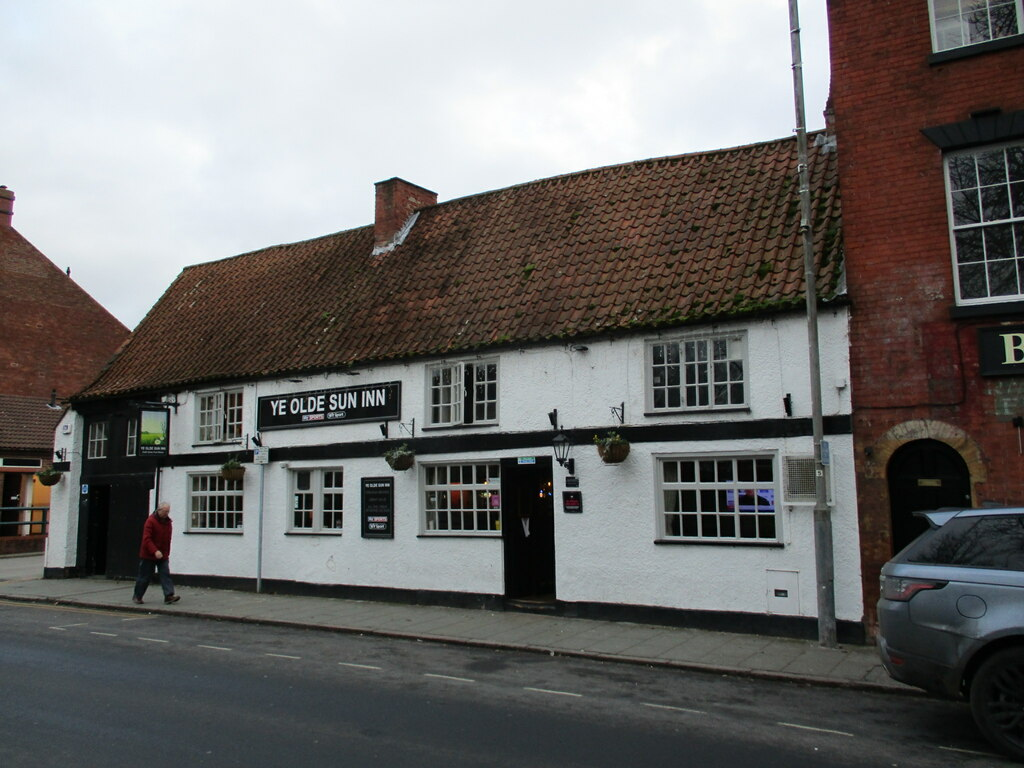
16th century timber-framed Ye Olde Sun, Retford

Many of the historic public houses are now listed buildings. Historic pubs include:

- The White Hart, an historic (Grade II–listed) 18th-century coaching inn that has a cobbled yard and stabling for horses. At its peak it saw 19 stages a day pass through.
- The Vine Inn (Grade II–listed), an 18th-century public house
- Whitehouse Inn (Grade II–listed) an 18th-century inn on the south edge of town.
- The Olde Sun on Chapelgate is a Grade II–listed timber-framed building that dates from the 16th century and is one of the oldest buildings remaining in the town
- The Crown Inn (building still exists but no longer a pub) dates from 1754; was once the principal place of conducting business in the town
- The Queen's Head, a Grade II–listed public house on Moorgate
- New Inn Public House (building still exists but no longer a pub), a Grade II–listed building on Whinney Moor Lane
- The Black Boy, a Grade II–listed 19th-century public house on Moorgate
- The Turk's Head which replaced an earlier building and was built in the 1930s. Many original features remain
- The Elms Hotel, an early 19th-century detached stucco house on London Road
- Galway Arms, an early 19th-century public house on Bridgegate that was previously called the Mermaid Inn
- Newcastle Arms on Bridgegate. An historic Grade II listed former pub, now used as housing.
- The Anchor, a Grade II listed early 19th-century public house on Carolgate now called 'The Idle Valley Tap'.
- The Sherwood Ranger on Churchgate which was built in the late 1800s and was originally known as the "Ram Inn" but was renamed in 1894 in honour of the Sherwood Ranger Yeomanry Regiment who were based in Retford

In White's 1831 directory, several of the public houses are recorded as having female proprietors, including Ann Green of the Black Head (Chapelgate), Ann Sheppard of the George Inn (Moorgate), Mary Barlow of the Granby (Carolgate), Sarah Walker of the Sun (Spittal Hill) and Ann Clarke of the Turk's Head (Grove Street).

In 2020 the landlord of the historic Black Boy Inn in Retford removed the pub's signage after it was highlighted on a crowdsourced map entitled 'topple the racists - statues and monuments that celebrate slavery and racism' during the Black Lives Matter protests. However, the name of the pub is said to be a coded reference to its royalist history. Charles II was called 'the black boy' by his mother Henrietta Maria due to his swarthy complexion and dark hair. During the interregnum, some public houses across England changed their name to The Black Boy in a show of concealed (and deniable) allegiance and because they were meeting places for royalist supporters.

=== Sundown Adventureland ===
Sundown Adventureland is a 30-acre children's theme park for the under 10s situated in the Retford Rural District at Rampton. It was originally opened in 1968 as 'Pets Corner', it is privately owned by the Rhodes family. The park currently attracts almost 500,000 visitors a year, employs 120 staff at peak season, and in 2022 TripAdvisor gave it a Traveller's Choice Award. In February 2020 it was announced that the park had been granted planning permission to add 90 holiday lodges.

=== Youth groups ===
Retford is served by many youth groups including The Scout Association, Girlguiding UK, St. John Ambulance and Young Farmers, meeting within the town. Retford is also home to 1403 ATC Retford Squadron and Army Cadets. In addition Retford is served by a youth musical theatre group known as The MOB (mini operatic bunch) the junior section of Retford Amateur Operatic Society.

=== Charter Day ===
To celebrate the granting of Retford's Royal Charter in 1246, the town holds a celebration known as Charter Day on the first Bank Holiday in May. The event celebrated its 25th anniversary in 2018 and now enjoys tens of thousands of visitors who take part in the many events held around the town. These include musical performances, vintage car rallies, street entertainers, dance performances, dog displays, food stalls, workshops, demonstrations and a charity market. Retford Fire Station perform 'rescues' to demonstrate their job to the public. One of the most popular events is the annual Lions' Duck Race, where locals and visitors sponsor a yellow plastic duck which is then 'raced' between two bridges on the river Idle. The money raised is donated to charity.

=== Retford Heritage Day ===
Since 2007 Retford has held an annual Heritage Day organised by the Civic Society. It is part of the National Heritage Days weekend with Retford celebrating its heritage with a host of activities and entertainment. Each year has a different theme, with 2014 being 'The End of an Era', 2015 being 'Entertainment', 2016 being 'Rebels and Pilgrims', and 2017 was 'Dukes and Outlaws'. In 2019, the Heritage Day is planned to take place at the same time as the first North Notts Literary Festival and the start of the Chesterfield Canal Walking Festival, with the theme being the Chesterfield Canal and Retford's working history.

=== Morris dancing ===
Retford is home to the Rattlejag Morris Dancers who are based at the Church Hall next to Grove Street Methodist Church. Rattlejag Morris is a mixed dance side formed in January 2002. Using material initially collected from East Yorkshire as the basis they have set out to revive and develop a local dance programme based on research into dancing traditions in Nottinghamshire and Lincolnshire. They perform morris dances with rattles and sticks, broom, bacca pipe and sword dances. They "dance out" at Folk Festivals, Village Fayres, Community Events, Village Public Houses, Morris Day of Dance Events, May Day Celebrations, Charity fundraising events and more.

=== Ghosts ===
Retford has a tradition of ghost sightings. In 1915 an unknown correspondent wrote to The Retford Times about ghostly sightings in the 19th century. The writer reports seeing a woman wearing Georgian dress on Sutton Lane, as well as a less human-like figure on the North Road. Other ghost traditions include The Grey Lady of Ye Olde Bell Hotel (Barnby Moor), The Unfaithful Wife of West Retford Hotel, the White Girl of the White Hart Hotel. Other haunted buildings include the Masonic Hall.

== Sport ==
=== Bowling ===
Retford has facilities for flat green bowling at Goosemoor Lane and in King's Park, provided by Bassetlaw Council, and at Hallcroft. Teams from Retford and the surrounding area (including Worksop) compete in The Retford and District Bowls League.

- The Goosemoor Bowling Greens are used by the Goosemoor Bowls Club which play in the Retford & District, Goosemoor Afternoon League and the Worksop Friday League.
- The King's Park Bowling Greens are home to the Retford Park Bowls Club.
- Retford Bowling Green Limited was established in 1897 and is a lawn and short mat bowls club with a nine rink bowling green and a large club house.

=== Cricket ===
The Retford Town Cricket and Sports Club was established in 1850 and moved to its present ground in 1858. The club was a founding member of the Bassetlaw Cricket league in 1904, their inaugural match was against Whitwell Colliery. However, they had to wait until 1984 before they won the League Division 1A Championship. Retford has developed players who have played at County and International level, including Derek Randall.

=== Fitness and health ===
There are a number of gymnasiums, spas, and health, beauty & fitness centres in Retford. Aquatic activities such as lane swimming, fun swims, and water aerobics are provided in the Retford Leisure Centre, as well as gym facilities. Retford also has a small skate park within the grounds of Kings Park. Walking and cycling are well catered for, with a selection of well-maintained and sign-posted routes. The 46-mile Cuckoo Way, which runs alongside the Chesterfield Canal runs through Retford.

Retford launched a men's walk and talk group in 2021, which supports male mental health in Retford and is co-ordinated by Bassetlaw Action Centre. One walk takes place at Idle Valley, every second Saturday in the month, and another at Kings Park every fourth Saturday of the month.

=== Football ===
Retford is home to Retford United F.C. formed in 1987 and known as 'The Badgers' who play in the Northern Counties East League Premier Division whose ground is Cannon Park on Leverton Road.

Retford is also home to Retford F.C. formed in 2015 and known as 'The Choughs' whose ground is the SL2 Rail Stadium on Babworth Road and who curenelty play in the Northern Counties East League Premier Division.

In July 2020 Retford F.C. was awarded FA Charter Standard Community Club status.

Both Retford teams have junior sides, with Retford F.C taking over Ordsall Rangers during summer 2019.

Babworth Rovers, a well-established junior football team, is on the outskirts of town and includes players from Retford and the surrounding villages.

=== Golf ===
Located at the south eastern edge of the town, Retford Golf Club is a private members club founded in 1921. The original six hole course was designed by Tom Williamson and laid out on 38 acres of land leased from Colonel Sir Albert Whitaker of Babworth Hall around the area known locally as Whisker Hills. Two further new holes were opened in 1958 by Sir Stuart Goodwin. In 1990 nine more holes were added. The current course provides a varied mixture of open parkland, oak-lined fairways and changes of level. It is a popular destination for golf societies from across the East Midlands and South Yorkshire areas.

=== Racing ===
The East Retford Cavalry Races were held between 1849 and 1864. On 1 April 1868, the United Hunt Committee organised a race meeting at which the Sandbeck Farmers Stakes was won by a horse named Gobbo and the Retford United Hunt Steeplechase was won by Gladiateur.

On 9 April 1877, after a gap of 10 years, meetings began being held on land owned by the 7th Viscount Galway to the north of the town (off Bigsby Road). The second meeting took place on 1 April 1878 with five races being held: the Nottinghamshire Steeplechase, The Grove Farmers Stakes, Maiden Steeplechase, Innkeepers Selling Steeplechase Plate and the Retford Steeplechase. The third meeting did not take place until 1894 due to lack of interest. Various promotions were attempted to boost attendance including train excursions and in 1898 a Tenant Farmers lunch in the Town Hall followed by a free pass to the races. The Retford Hunt Committee oversaw the meetings until 1913, with racing being suspended during WW1 until being resumed in 1921. The final meeting took place in 1928. The land was then sold off to pay the debts of the 8th Viscount Galway. The Retford Handicap was transferred to the course at Southwell Racecourse and ran until the early 2000s.

=== Rugby ===
Founded in 1952, East Retford Rugby Union Football Club competes in the Midlands League Division. The club celebrated its Golden Jubilee in 2002. It initially played on a pitch at Hard Moors, off Goosemoor Lane, then owned by Jenkins of Retford. A pitch at Ranby Camp followed before the club moved to Frank Wood's field on Green Mile, Ranby. In 1966 the club entered into a long-term rental agreement with Anglian Water Authority for use of land at Ordsall Road, which has room for three pitches on flat, well-drained land. The Club purchased the majority of its Ordsall Road ground from Anglian Water in 2000. The club currently runs two senior teams and a thriving and successful junior section, from minis to under 16s, for both boys and girls.

=== Snooker ===
Retford has a long running snooker league consisting of two divisions.

=== Swimming ===
Retford Swimming Club represent the town and the surrounding area in the pool. The club, established in 1896, trains swimmers and takes part in competitive swimming galas against other teams in Nottinghamshire, in the Sports Centre League. Retford Swimming Club competes in Division 1 of the Sports Centre League. An annual Open Meet is held at Ponds Forge International Pool in Sheffield, hosted by the club.

== Health ==
Today Retford is served by Doncaster and Bassetlaw Teaching Hospitals NHS Foundation Trust. A number of GP centres, dental services, a hospital and hospice are situated in the town.

=== East Retford Cottage Hospital ===
East Retford Cottage Hospital (East Retford Dispensary) was a former hospital in the town of Retford situated on Thrumpton Lane. SK 700 800 38240

=== Eaton Hall ===
Between 1939 and 1941, Mrs KL Kayser agreed to allow the upper floors of Eaton Hall to be used as a maternity hospital for soldiers' wives who had been bombed-out of their homes.

=== Retford Hospital ===
Retford and District Hospital was built in 1922 with the foundation stone laid by the Mayor of Retford, Alderman SH Clay. At that time it comprised two wards, a private patients’ wing, an operating theatre, casualty service, and X-ray. It was extended in the late 1960s and early 1970s with two more wards, which were used for long-stay, elderly patients.

The operating theatre was closed in 1980 and inpatient services were transferred to Bassetlaw Hospital in the late 1980s. The Trust now provides a range of outpatient and community services on the site, which is also the headquarters of Bassetlaw PCT. Services include: an outpatient department, physiotherapy, speech therapy, chiropody, audiology, child health, community occupational health, community nursing/ equipment loans, continence service, dental, Genito-Urinary medicine, intermediate care and medical imaging. SK 700 800 102583

Co-located on the site of Retford Hospital is Retford Primary Care Centre which was built in 2007 and incorporates three GP practices, rehabilitation and physiotherapy departments, community nursing services and an on-site Boots pharmacy. To the rear of the hospital is Bassetlaw Hospice which was built in 1994.

=== First World War ===
Retford during the First World War had two Red Cross Hospitals for wounded servicemen. One was based at Babworth Hall, and the Sherwood Rangers Headquarters hospital was at 12 Lime Tree Avenue, Retford.

== Media ==
The majority of the town receives its terrestrial television from the Emley Moor transmitting station, which broadcasts local news from BBC Look North and Calendar News. A minority of residents receive programming from Belmont serving Lincolnshire and East Yorkshire (to the east) and Waltham serving the East Midlands (to the south).

Retford's officially designated BBC Local Radio station in terms of radio coverage is BBC Radio Sheffield. However, editorially, local news coverage is covered on BBC Radio Nottingham's radio and Internet outlets, despite Retford being outside the official coverage area of both BBC Radio Nottingham's FM and DAB signals. Hits Radio South Yorkshire's and Greatest Hits South Yorkshire's AM signals also cover the town of Retford. National analogue FM radio services from the BBC and Classic FM are broadcast from the Holme Moss transmitting station in West Yorkshire. Digital Radio services come primarily from the Clarborough transmitter 5 miles (8 km) outside of Retford for the Sheffield and Digital One multiplexes, Clifton transmitter near Doncaster for the BBC National DAB multiplex and the Belmont, High Hunsley (near Hull) and Tapton Hill (Sheffield), Waltham and Emley Moor transmitters for the Sound Digital multiplex.

Trax FM formerly editorially covered the town of Retford, although its Ofcom designated FM coverage area only covered the Doncaster area, Worksop and rural areas west of Retford, Retford was covered on DAB via the Sheffield multiplex. It has since been replaced with a relay of Greatest Hits Radio Yorkshire on its former FM frequencies. TX1 Radio took over as a replacement local commercial service from 2020 for the same editorial area as Trax FM covered via the Internet and for a short time on DAB via the Lincolnshire multiplex which has overspill coverage into the Doncaster and Bassetlaw area.

Retford also has one newspaper serving the town, the Retford Times which is published on Thursdays. It was founded in 1869 by Alexander Watson Lyall as the 'Retford and Gainsborough Times and Worksop Weekly News'. In 1880 it changed its name to the 'Retford and Gainsborough Times and Worksop & Newark Weekly News' and from 1901 it was the 'Retford, Gainsborough & Worksop Times and Newark & Mansfield Weekly News'. In 1967 it became the 'Retford, Gainsborough & Worksop Times' before dropping 'Worksop' from its masthead in 2011. In 2013 it became simply 'The Retford Times'. It is now published by Lincolnshire Media, although the editorial offices are in Retford.

The Worksop Guardian, although predominately a newspaper serving Worksop and its area, also covers stories in Retford. The publishers of the Worksop Guardian formerly published a free weekly newspaper for Retford and Bawtry, the Guardian and Trader newspaper.

== Cemetery ==
Retford cemetery is a Victorian era cemetery, with the site's first burial dating back to 1854 (when it was built). Prior to the cemetery, maps dating back to 1835 confirm that the area was covered by farmland. It is approximately 25 acres (10 ha) in size, situated between Babworth Road and North Road. It is bounded by the Chesterfield canal (which separates the two halves of the cemetery) and has two entrances – one on North Road (the original entrance) and one on Babworth Road next to St Joseph's church. It is maintained by Bassetlaw District Council (BDC), which has freehold ownership of the site.

The cemetery was opened in several parts. The oldest part of the cemetery dates to 1854 and was opened at a cost of £1,800. It had two mortuary chapels designed by Arthur Wilson (one Church of England and one Nonconformist) that were linked by a porch. These were demolished in the 1970s. It also had a cemetery lodge designed by James Fowler which still exists as a private home. In the 1854 cemetery is a separate Catholic cemetery. In the 1890s the town cemetery was extended to land on the other side of the canal, with the two halves linked by a bridge. In the 1950s a donation of land was made by the Catholic church to extend the 1890 cemetery. This land had been donated in 1922 by Major Milner for the burial of Catholics. Part of the land was used for a Catholic church, school and hall. The remainder was donated to extend the general cemetery, with provision for a (new) separate Catholic cemetery.

Retford cemetery contains 14 Commonwealth war graves from the First World War, and 16 from the Second World War. There is also one Polish soldier buried there.

== Education ==
=== Primary schools ===
- St Swithun's CE Primary Academy
- St Josephs Catholic Primary school
- Bracken Lane Academy
- Thrumpton Primary Academy
- Carr Hill Primary School
- Ordsall Primary School

=== Senior schools ===
- The Elizabethan Academy
- Retford Oaks Academy
- St. Giles

As part of a major overhaul of secondary schools in the Bassetlaw area, all schools have now been moved to new facilities built around the town as part of the Transform Schools scheme. Retford is home to a Post-16 centre the aim of which was to unite all Sixth Form students in one site (formerly Ordsall Hall School) and provide other courses available through North Nottinghamshire College (based at Worksop). Since the spring of 2018, A Level students have returned to their respective secondary schools and now use the dedicated Post-16 centre for vocational and technical courses, as well as higher education.

=== Historic schools ===
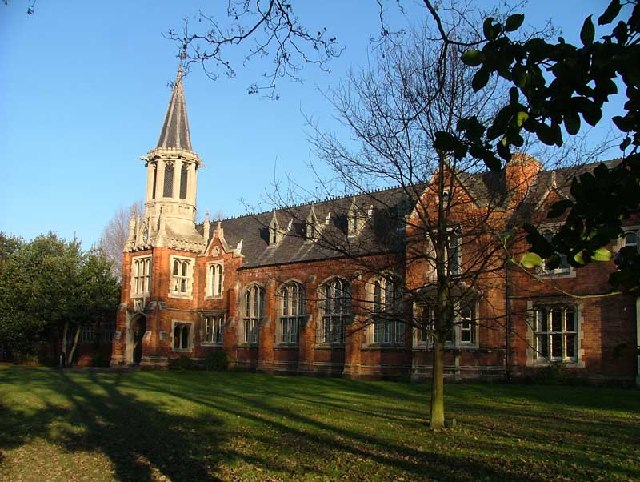
The historic Edward VI Grammar School buildings in Retford, designed by Decimus Burton

King Edward VI Grammar School (Motto - Ex Pulvere Palma) opened in August 1857 and was designed by the noted Victorian architect Decimus Burton. The school traced its foundations to Thomas Gunthorpe of Babworth in 1519, although there are references to a still earlier school in the town. It was refounded around 1551 during the reign of King Edward VI. The school accepted boarders from at least the 17th century onwards, with the last boarders leaving in 1938. Retford during the Second World War took in over 6,000 evacuee children, including a number of boys from Great Yarmouth Grammar School who were evacuated to Retford (from 1940 to 1944) and taught in classrooms at King Edward VI Grammar School. The school eventually became part of the Retford Oaks Academy and moved to new premises on the edge of town, although the original Grade II listed buildings still exist on London Road.

The school donated the sledge pulled by the pony Michael in Robert Falcon Scott's expedition to the South Pole. Scott had appealed to the school boys of Great Britain to provide funds for the expedition, and the boys of Retford Grammar School contributed three guineas, with the Head Master adding 12s 6d to round it up to the cost of providing one sledge. Scott acknowledged the donation and wrote a postscript to the acknowledgement by hand to say: "Will you please give my hearty thanks to the boys for their generous subscription and good wishes. A sledge will be called ‘Retford.’—R.S."

Retford County High School for Girls has its origins in a meeting convened at the White Hart Hotel, Retford 'to consider the advisability of taking steps to establish a public High School for Girls in the district'. The prime instigator in the new project was the manager of the Westminster Bank, Mr. William Oakden, who in 1891 had moved from Nottingham to Retford. He and other like-minded people wanted to provide their daughters with some form of higher education. The school eventually found a site on the corner of Pelham Road and Queen Street, adjacent to the canal. The school educated around 400 girls in the 1950s to 1970s. In 1979 the secondary schools in Retford were reorganised and the 11+ abolished. Boys were to be admitted for the first time. The result was a comprehensive school called 'The Elizabethan High School' under head teacher Mrs Coxon-Butler. At this time the former Hallcroft Girls' secondary modern school on Hallcroft Road became the new school's Lower Site and the Retford Girls' High School became the school's Upper Site. The former Pelham Road/Queen Street site was demolished when the school moved to new buildings in Hallcroft and was renamed The Elizabethan Academy. The Pelham Road site is now a housing estate.

== International Relations ==
Retford has twinning associations with:

- Pfungstadt (Germany).
- Aurillac (France) since 1980.
- Farmers Branch (United States) since 1980.

== Notable people ==
=== Actors and media personalities ===
- Hugh Armstrong (actor)
- Doc Cox, television presenter, media personality, musician
- Kat Hawkins, presenter and producer
- Philip Jackson, actor who starred in Agatha Christie's Poirot.

=== Artists and photographers ===
- Thomas Clater, painter
- John Warham, photographer

=== Military ===
- Robert Craufurd, Major General during Peninsular War, Member of Parliament for East Retford
- George F. Hopkinson, commanded the First Airborne Division in World War II
- Jim McCairns, pilot, raised in Retford, educated at King Edward VI Grammar School
- Francis Thornhagh, English Civil War Parliamentarian soldier, MP for East Retford

=== Politicians ===
- Richard Quigley MP for the Isle of Wight West constituency.
- Anthony Perrinott Lysberg Barber, Baron Barber, British Conservative politician
- John Cartwright, campaigner for parliamentary reform, built the Revolutionary Mill in Retford
- Thomas White, politician, MP for Retford

=== Scientists and scholars ===
- Arthur James Mason, clergyman, theologian and classical scholar
- Samuel Milner, physicist
- Francis Orpen Morris, ornithologist and entomologist, curate at All Hallows 1837-1842
- Harry Pettit, former assistant professor of geography at Radboud University Nijmegen (2023-2025) and political activist

=== Sports and games ===
- Ed Bulling, professional footballer
- Mike Hall, Nottinghamshire cricketer lived in Retford and played for Retford Cricket Club
- Liam Lawrence, footballer for Sunderland AFC and Republic of Ireland
- Ted Linley, footballer
- Albert Peatfield, cricketer
- Derek Randall, cricketer for Nottinghamshire and England
- Sam Trickett, poker player
- Russell Wainscoat, footballer

=== Writers, journalists, publishers ===
- Max Blagg, poet
- Stephen Booth, crime writer
- Frank Branston, journalist, newspaper owner, and mayor of Bedford
- John Glasby, novelist, chemist, mathematician
- Catherine Grace Frances Gore (Moody), novelist and playwright
- Dorothy May Meads, writer and educator
- Andrew Moody, journalist and recipient of Chinese Government's 'Friendship Award'
- John Taylor, English publisher

=== Miscellaneous ===
- Anne Denman, grandmother of Anne Hyde and great-grandmother of Queen Mary and Queen Anne
- John Kelsall, British composer, conductor and lecturer
- James Parnell, prominent Quaker, writer, preacher and known as "The Boy Martyr" who met George Fox in prison.
- Samuel Wright, nonconformist
