= Eileen Skellern =

- Born: Flora Eileen Skellern; 14 June 1923; Stone, Staffordshire
- Died: 29 August 1980 (aged 57)
- Education: Retford High School for Girls
- Occupation(s): Psychiatric Nurse, Superintendent of Nursing, Fellow of the Royal College of Nursing
- Medical career
- Profession: Nurse
- Field: Psychiatry
- Institutions: Leeds General Infirmary, Cassel Hospital, Belmont Hospital, St Bartholomew’s Hospital, Cheadle Royal Hospital, Bethlem Royal Hospital
- Notable works: The Role of the Ward Sister

Eileen Skellern, probably painted by a patient, portrait from Bethlem Museum of the Mind

Eileen Skellern FRCN (1923–1980) was an English psychiatric nurse who was involved in pioneering psychosocial and psychotherapeutic methods for treating patients. She helped open up new roles for nurses in mental health work, and demonstrated that they could be equal partners in a team, taking personal responsibility for patient care while collaborating with doctors and playing an important part in new developments in therapeutic treatment. While also taking a lead in education, administration and policy development, she did research and published in medical and nursing journals, and was a member of key committees in her field.

== Early life and education ==
Flora Eileen Skellern was born on 14 June 1923 in Stone, Staffordshire to Flora (née Poole) and Willis Arthur Skellern, a commercial traveller. After attending Retford High School for Girls in Nottinghamshire she went to train as a nurse at Leeds General Infirmary, qualified in 1944, and worked there, first as a staff nurse, then in 1946 as a sister on a ward where there were some psychiatric patients.

== The Cassel and Belmont hospitals ==
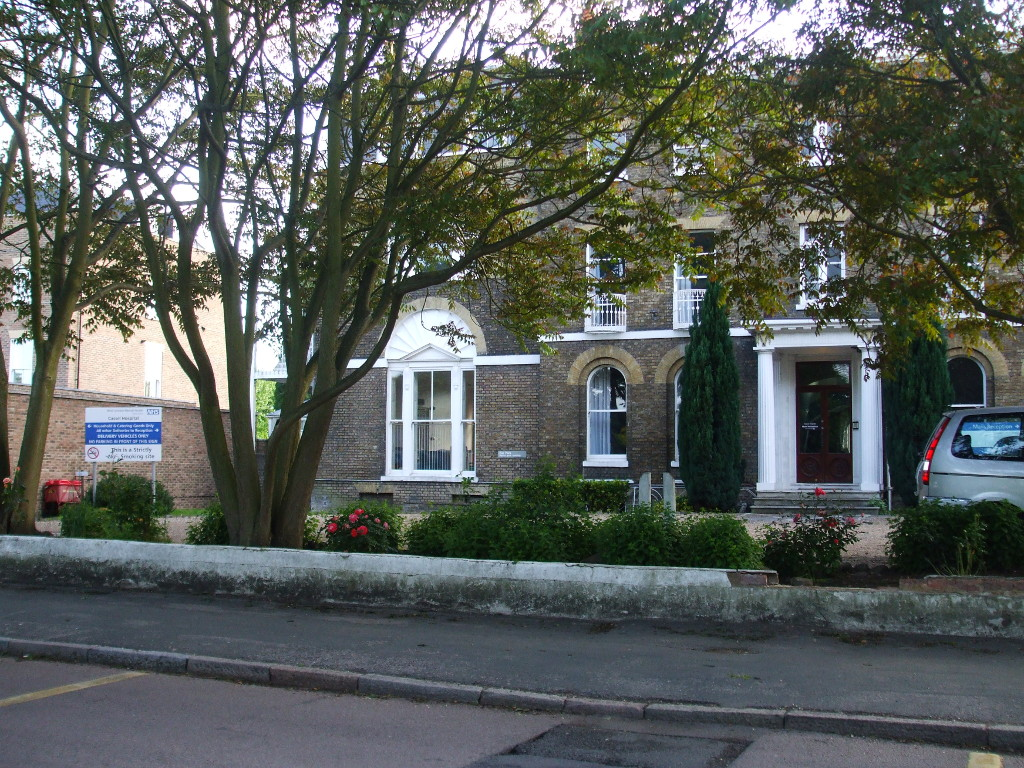
The Cassel Hospital in 2013.

Her introduction to nursing psychiatric patients in Leeds made her interested in modern psychological approaches to care of the mentally unwell. The Cassel Hospital by Ham Common, London had a reputation for treating patients in a therapeutic environment and she moved there in 1948 to follow their recently developed course in psychosocial treatment and nursing for nervous disorders. Skellern joined the Cassel Social Therapy Unit as a permanent staff member in 1949. There she worked with Tom Main on pioneering psychotherapeutic and psychosocial treatments. During her time at the Cassel she underwent psychoanalysis herself and observers said she found it easier to collaborate with analytically inclined doctors and nurses.

In 1952–53 she wrote a report for the Royal College of Nursing, The Role of the Ward Sister. It was based on numerous visits to hospitals and was funded by a scholarship grant given for a study of the “practical application to ward administration of modern methods in the instruction and handling of staff and student nurses”. It was "the first serious piece of nursing research done in England by a psychiatric nurse".

In 1953 she went to the Belmont Hospital, Sutton to be sister in charge of its Social Rehabilitation Unit catering for 100 patients. Here the psychiatrist was Maxwell Jones. Together they developed therapeutic community initiatives which laid the foundations for significant advances in psychiatric nursing. Skellern established that interactions with nurses could be crucial in preparing patients to return to their home communities. As well as supporting rehabilitation through one-to-one relationships, nurses could undertake family and group work. Skellern and Jones worked with others to develop group methods for helping patients return to society. They proceeded as equals in forming conclusions about their therapies and treatments. Both published articles about their work, and Skellern's papers have been described as giving a "definitive picture of the new developments in psychiatric nursing in the 1950s". She herself was "prominent" in "laying the foundation of [this] style of psycho-social nursing". While she was in charge she collaborated with a team of anthropologists and social scientists who were studying the Unit. It became the Henderson Hospital not long after Skellern left, and the Jones-Skellern ideas were carried forward there.

== Later career ==
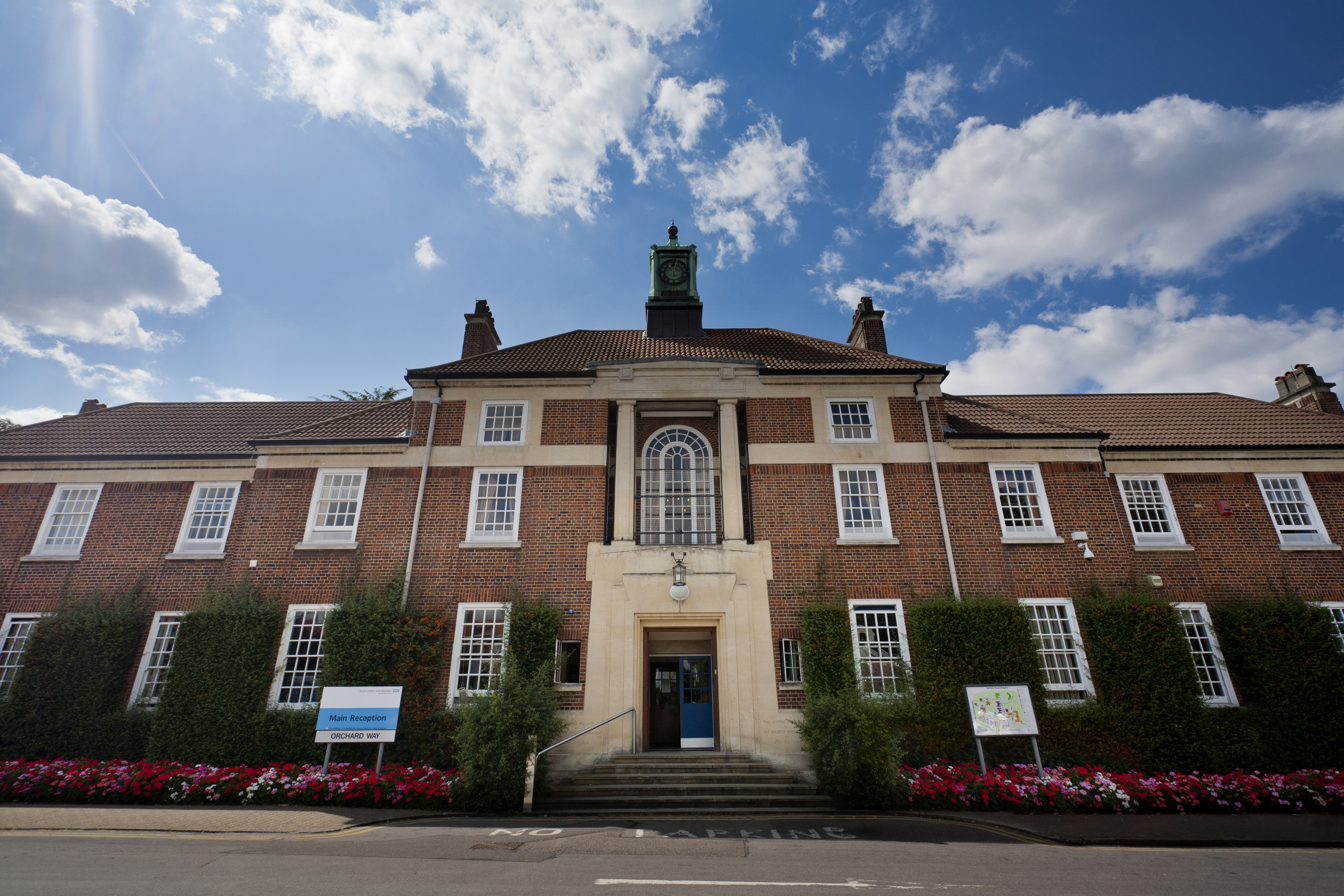
Bethlem Royal Hospital in 2011

From 1957 to 1959 she studied at the Royal College of Nursing to qualify as a registered nurse teacher (RNT) and worked as sister tutor for the next two years at St Bartholomew's Hospital. She went to Cheadle Royal Hospital in Cheshire to qualify as a registered mental nurse (RMN). From then on Skellern was always based in the London area and moved to the Bethlem Royal and Maudsley in 1963 to be Superintendent of Nursing, a post to which she had been appointed before her studies in Cheshire. Here she helped establish a therapeutic community unit; she was rarely "far away from the idea of therapeutic communities" despite the many different aspects of her work.

She was a good teacher and was innovative in developing curricula for psychiatric nurse education using group methods. The students' clinical experience was central to their training and was explicitly linked to their classroom work. This approach was in tune with that of Elliott Jaques, professor of social sciences at Brunel University, whose students went on industrial placements as part of their course. Jacques and Skellern collaborated on the first course ever to combine nursing with social sciences, and developed a joint nursing certificate and degree course which, from 1968, was offered half at the Maudsley and half at Brunel. Another educational innovation was also a collaboration: this time with Isaac Marks of the Institute of Psychiatry. In 1973 he and Skellern set up a behavioural psychotherapy course for experienced nurses, which has been seen as an important step in recognising the potential of nurses to act as therapists.

Skellern's title of Superintendent changed to Chief Nursing Officer in 1972 as NHS management was restructured. She used her leadership and experience to support colleagues, and was `seen as a fair manager with a warm manner and an understanding of the needs of hospital clinical staff at all levels. She took on a considerable amount of committee work including work for the King's Fund health think tank, and membership of a working party chaired by the secretary of state for health Richard Crossman investigating problems in closed institutions for the mentally handicapped. Since Crossman's advisor, Brian Abel-Smith, was a friend she was able to make valuable contributions in private as well as more publicly. She was awarded an OBE in 1972, the year the resulting report was published.

In the 1970s she developed cancer but continued to work as much as she could until taking early retirement in 1980, not long before she died on 29 July 1980. In September 1980 the first International Psychiatric Nursing Congress was held, an event which she had been planning for two years. Two days before she died she learned that she had been made a Fellow of the Royal College of Nursing. An Eileen Skellern Memorial Lecture series in her honour began in 1982. Among the speakers in the 1980s were Annie Altschul and Caroline Cox. From 2006 the lecture has been the occasion for the presentation of a Lifetime Achievement Award, with recipients including Jo Brand, Helen Bamber, Shirley Smoyak and Malcolm Rae. She has also been recognised by having a new building at the Maudsley named after her: the only nurse to have been remembered in this way.
