= List of people from Preston =

This is a list of the famous and notable people from Preston, Lancashire, England. For other Prestons see Preston.

== A ==
- Sir Richard Arkwright (1732–1792) — inventor of the water frame which revolutionised the cotton making industry in the late 18th century
- Fiona Armstrong (born 1956) — journalist, newsreader

== B ==
- Professor Sir George Grenfell Baines (1908–2003) — architect, pioneer of multi-disciplinary design, and founder of the Building Design Partnership
- Heather Baron-Gracie (born 1995) — singer, songwriter, and musician in the band Pale Waves
- Roy Barraclough (1935–2017) — actor from Coronation Street
- Stephen Barton (born 1982) — composer for film, television, and video games
- Leo Baxendale (born 1930 in Preston) — cartoonist, ex-PCC and creator of Beano strips Little Plum (1953), Minnie the Minx (1953), The Bash Street Kids
- Stu Bennett (born 1980) — wrestler also known by his ring name, Wade Barrett
- Tom Benson — marathon walker who held six world records
- Ian Bibby - Pro cyclist
- Bob - cat owned by Danny Murphy
- Holly Bradshaw - Pole vaulter
- Angela Brazil — writer of schoolgirls' stories
- Hannah Britland, actress.
- Jim Burns (born 1936) — poet, writer and magazine editor

== C ==
- Eddie Calvert (1922–1978) — trumpeter, "The Man With the Golden Horn"
- Chris Canavan (1929–2013) — television and theatre actor, extra on Coronation Street from 1962 to 2013
- Clarke Carlisle - Footballer
- Hugh Carthy (born 1994) - Pro Cyclist
- Arthur Catterall (1883–1943) — concert violinist and conductor
- Belle Chrystall (1910–2003) — actress, born in Preston
- Helen Clitheroe (born 1974) — athlete, 1500m and 3000m steeplechase, went to Broughton High School

== D ==
- Joseph Delaney (born 1945) — author of science fiction and fantasy books, born in Preston
- Anthony Devis (1729–1816) Half-brother of the artist Arthur Devis.
- Arthur Devis (1712–1728) Portrait artist, born and lived in Preston.
- Gregory Doran (born 1958) — Associate Director, Royal Shakespeare Company
- Tupele Dorgu (born 1977) — actress, known for role of Kelly Crabtree in Coronation Street
- Joseph Dunn (1746–1827) — owner of the coal-gas lighting company, the Preston Gaslight Company
- Anulka Dziubinska (born 1950) — actress and model

== E ==
- Paul Englishby (born 1970) — film and theatre composer

== F ==
- Tim Farron (born 1970) — Leader of the Liberal Democrats and MP for Westmorland and Lonsdale
- Sir Tom Finney (1922–2014) — footballer
- Scott Fitzgerald - Boxer, commonwealth gold medallist and WBA International super welterweight title holder
- Andrew Flintoff (born 1977) — cricketer
- Dick Forshaw - Footballer, won League title with both Liverpool F.C. and Everton F.C.
- Don Foster, Baron Foster of Bath (born 1947) — Liberal Democrat politician

== G ==
- Zara Glover (born 1982) — international ten-pin bowler

== H ==
- Susan Hanson (born 1943) —actress, Crossroads
- A.J. Hartley (born 1964) — novelist
- George Haydock (1556–1584) — Catholic priest, martyr
- James Hebblethwaite (1857–1921) — poet
- Ben Hinchliffe (born 9 October 1987) is an English professional footballer who plays as a goalkeeper for EFL League Two club Stockport County.
- Mary Ann Hobbs - BBC radio DJ
- John Horrocks (1768–1804) — Member of Parliament for Preston
- Henry Hunt (1773–1835) — politician, noted for his campaigns that drastically improved the lives of working-class people

== I ==
- John Inman (1935–2007) — comedy actor and pantomime artist

== J ==
- Phil Jones, footballer

== K ==
- Alan Kelly Jr - former professional footballer and Irish international
- Kevin Kilbane - professional footballer and Irish international
- Ian Kirkham — saxophone player, Simply Red

== L ==
- General Sir Percy Henry Noel Lake — first Chief of the Canadian General Staff, commander of the 7th Indian Division and Chief of the Indian General Staff
- Mark Lawrenson (born 1957) — footballer turned football pundit
- Joseph Livesey (1794–1884) — social reformer and pioneer of the temperance movement in the 19th century
- Sir John Francis Lockwood — Master of Birkbeck College, London, 1951–1965, and Vice-Chancellor of the University of London, 1955-1958
- Andy Lonergan (born 1983) — footballer at Bolton Wanderers, ex-Preston North End
- Bhavna Limbachia (born 1984) — English actress famous for playing Alia in Citizen Khan and Rana Habeeb in Coronation Street

== M ==
- James Mawdsley (1848–1902), English trade unionist
- Ian McCulloch (born 1971) — snooker player who reached career highest ranking of #16
- Gordon Milne: Footballer.
- Nazia Mogra, Children's TV presenter and senior television journalist for BBC Newsround and BBC North West Tonight News on BBC One and BBC Sport.

== N ==
- Ken Nicol (born 1951) — musician and guitarist in British folk rock band Steeleye Span
- John Nuttall (born 1967) — British long-distance runner who competed in track and cross country.

== P ==
- Nick Park (born 1958) — animator famous known for Wallace and Gromit and Chicken Run claymation
- Stuart Pettman (born 1975) — snooker player
- Peter Purves — Blue Peter presenter

== R ==
- Malcolm Rae, British senior registered specialist in mental nursing/forensic psychiatry, mental health consultant, nursing educator and civil servant
- Edith Rigby (1872–1950) — suffragette

== S ==
- Robert W. Service (1874–1958) —poet, known for his writings about the Yukon and the Klondike
- Ranvir Singh —BBC news presenter and journalist
- J. Keighley Snowden (1860–1947), — journalist and novelist
- Johnny Sullivan (1932–2003) — British boxer and Commonwealth Middleweight Champion
- Andrew Sznajder (born 1967) —English-born Canadian tennis player

== T ==
- Jessica Taylor (born 1980) —singer with Liberty X
- Francis Thompson (1859–1907) — poet
- John Thomson — actor and comedian

== W ==
- John Wall (1620–1679) — martyr and saint
- Dick Wilson (1916–2007) — actor
