= Ordsall =

Ordsall may refer to more than one place in England:

- Ordsall, Greater Manchester
  - Ordsall (ward), an electoral ward of the Salford City Council
  - Ordsall Hall
- Ordsall, Nottinghamshire
  - Ordsall Hall School
