= Retford Oaks Academy =

Secondary school in Retford, England

Location
- Babworth Road; Retford, Nottinghamshire, DN22 7NJ; England
- 53°19′15″N 0°57′26″W

Information
- Type: Academy
- Motto: Dedicated to excellence
- Established: 2003
- Department for Education URN: 137117 Tables
- Ofsted: Reports
- Gender: Coeducational
- Age: 11 to 18
- Houses: Cumber, Rufford, Sherwood, Thorseby
- Colours: green, black, yellow, white
- Former names: King Edward VI School, Ordsall Hall School, Sir Frederick Milner Secondary Modern, Retford Oaks High School
- Website: https://www.retfordoaks-ac.org.uk/

Retford Oaks Academy is a coeducational comprehensive secondary school and sixth form located in the market town of Retford, Nottinghamshire, England, situated in the district of Bassetlaw.

== Academic performance ==
The school has improved from a poor starting point since opening in 2003. The number of students achieving 5 or more A* to C grades at GCSE has risen from 20% in 2006 to 49% in 2011. The opening of the separate sixth form centre with The Elizabethan Academy, effectively operating as a sixth form college, has produced A level results above the England average.

== Ofsted ==
Retford Oaks Academy was last inspected in May 2022, with the overall judgement being that it is a ‘good’ school. The report highlighted the steps that have been taken to ensure a positive, safe and successful learning experience for all students.

== History ==
The school was established in 2003 with the amalgamation of two of the schools in Retford. His Royal Highness, The Duke of Kent formally opened the school in October 2008. In September 2009 the school was designated as a specialist sports college with its second subject being Mathematics. In September 2011 the school officially became academy as part of the Diverse Academies Trust.

=== Older schools: King Edward VI Grammar School and the Girls' High School ===
The King Edward VI School was on London Road. It was previously known as the King Edward VI Grammar School and the oldest part of the school buildings (opened in August 1857) was designed by Decimus Burton. The Grammar School magazine was called The Retfordian. The school motto was Ex Pulvere Palma. In later years the school's senior houses were Edward, Foljambe, Gough, and Overend. The junior houses were Bescoby, Darrell, Laycock, and Mason (all named after school benefactors).

The school usually traced its original foundation back to Thomas Gunthorpe of Babworth in 1519 although there are references to a still earlier school in the town. It was refounded around 1551 during the reign of King Edward VI. It subsequently had a chequered history, twice coming close to collapse during the 19th century. The school accepted boarders from at least the 17th century onwards, but the last boarders left in 1938. During the Second World War a number of boys from the Great Yarmouth Grammar School were evacuated to Retford (from 1940 to 1944), and were taught in classrooms at King Edward VI Grammar School.

Headmasters of King Edward VI Grammar School

- ?1551 Rev. Christopher Say, LL.B., Jesus College, Cambridge
- 1588 Rev. George Turvyn (or Turvin), MA, Trinity College, Cambridge
- ?1605 Rev Thomas Cooper, MA, Corpus Christi College, Cambridge
- 1628 Rev. Nicholas Dickons [or Dickens), MA, Pembroke College, Cambridge
- 1638 Thomas Stacey, MA, Corpus Christi College, Cambridge
- 1642 Rev. Thomas Dand, MA, Trinity College, Cambridge
- 1669 Robert Pinchbeck.
- 1670 Henry Boawre (or Boare/Bower), MA, St John's College, Cambridge
- 1702 Rev. Thomas Moore, St John's College, Cambridge
- 1708 Rev. Henry Stevenson
- 1748 Rev. Seth Ellis Stevenson, MA, Peterhouse, Cambridge

A diary kept by Seth Ellis Stevenson between 1752-55 survives in Wigan Archives. Another diary from 1760-77 is in Nottingham University Library.

- 1793 Rev. William Tyre, MA, Pembroke College, Oxford
- 1801 Rev. William Mould, MA, Peterhouse, Cambridge
- 1838 Rev. William Henry Trentham, MA, St John's College, Cambridge

Trentham resigned and died in 1842. From 1842-47 no headmaster was appointed, although the usher, James Holderness, continued to teach a few pupils

- 1847 Rev. John Henry Brown, MA, Trinity College, Cambridge (later headmaster of Brewood Grammar School, Staffordshire)

Following Brown's departure, no headmaster was appointed between 1850-57. Henry Clarke Mitchinson, the usher and sole remaining teacher, was acting headmaster, but his alleged harshness in corporal punishment led to various complaints and to an eventual court case.

- 1857 Rev. Jonathan Page Clayton, MA, Gonville and Caius College, Cambridge
- 1866 Rev. Edward Swinden Sanderson, MA, Corpus Christi College, Cambridge
- 1870 Rev. Frederick Richard Pentreath, MA, DD, Worcester College, Oxford
- 1873 Rev. Alfred John Church, MA, Lincoln College, Oxford
- 1880 Rev. Oliver Carter Cockrem, MA, LLD, Trinity College Dublin
- 1886 Rev. Thomas Gough, BSc, FGS, London University

Gough was formerly headmaster of Elmfield College, York. Historian A D Grounds commented that "he may with justice be called the school's second founder".

- 1919 Charles Roland Skrimshire, MA, Merton College, Oxford
- 1926 Charles William Pilkington-Rogers, MA, BSc., Queens’ College, Cambridge
- 1950 John Charles Havelock Gover, MA, Emmanuel College, Cambridge
- c1972 Tom Savage
- c1978 Michael Allen

After amalgamating with the Sir Frederick Milner Secondary School in 1979, the new establishment was known simply as the King Edward VI School until the eventual second merger into the Oaks School.

Earlier there was also Retford High School for Girls on Pelham Road – a Girls' grammar school.

=== Previous schools up to 2003 ===
Before 1979, the former Sir Frederick Milner Secondary School (an all-male secondary modern school) was on Pennington Walk, with around 500 boys, in the east of the town. This became part of the King Edward VI School, a voluntary controlled school, and was used as the sixth form site prior to the new Post-16 centre being opened in 2007. The former site will become residential properties. Sir Frederick Milner was the Conservative MP from 1890 to 1906 for Bassetlaw.

The former Retford Oaks School was on a site towards Ordsall near the former leisure centre, which was the former Ordsall Hall School on Ordsall Road (now the Post-16 Centre). This merged with the King Edward VI School in 2003 forming the current school.

=== Regeneration ===
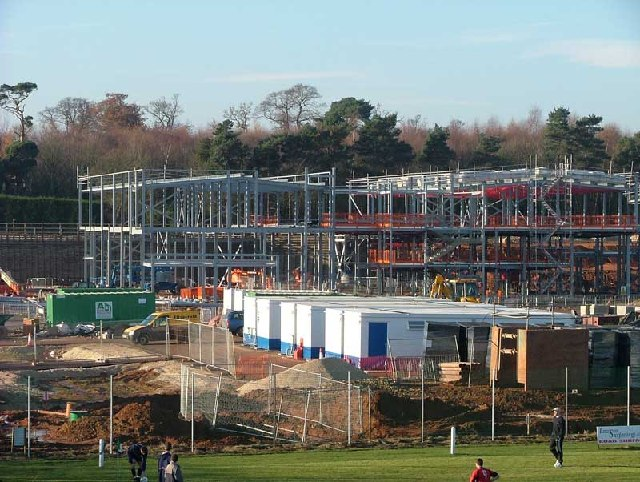
Construction of new school in December 2005 by Balfour Beatty

Similar to five other schools in Bassetlaw (two in Worksop and one in Tuxford, Bircotes and The Elizabethan High School in Retford), the school underwent an extensive rebuilding programme under PFI funding. It was not possible to develop the King Edward VI School site as a Post-16 Centre (even though the county council wanted to), because the county council did not own the property so an entirely new site was built on Babworth Road. This site is for ages 11–16. On the former Ordsall Hall site, a new leisure centre was built (nextdoor) in January 2008 and a separate Post-16 (sixth form) Centre was built in September 2007, when the 11–16 site opened as well. Worksop has also had a new sixth form (and leisure centre) built under the same PFI contract.

== Notable former pupils ==
=== King Edward VI School ===
- JS Clayden, vocalist for British musical group Pitchshifter, founder of PSI Records

=== King Edward VI Grammar School ===
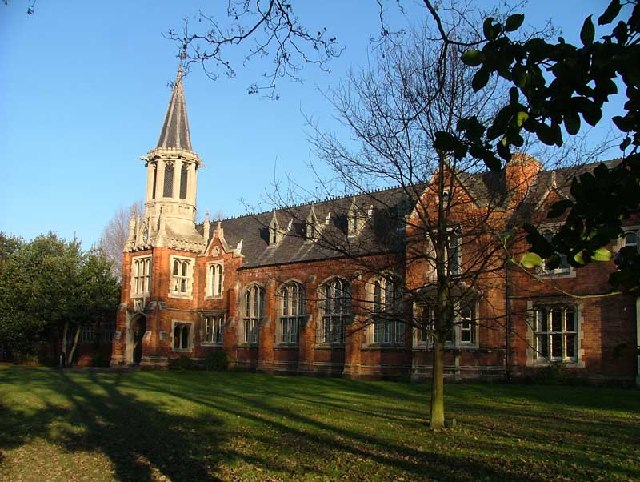
Former King Edward VI Grammar School pupil

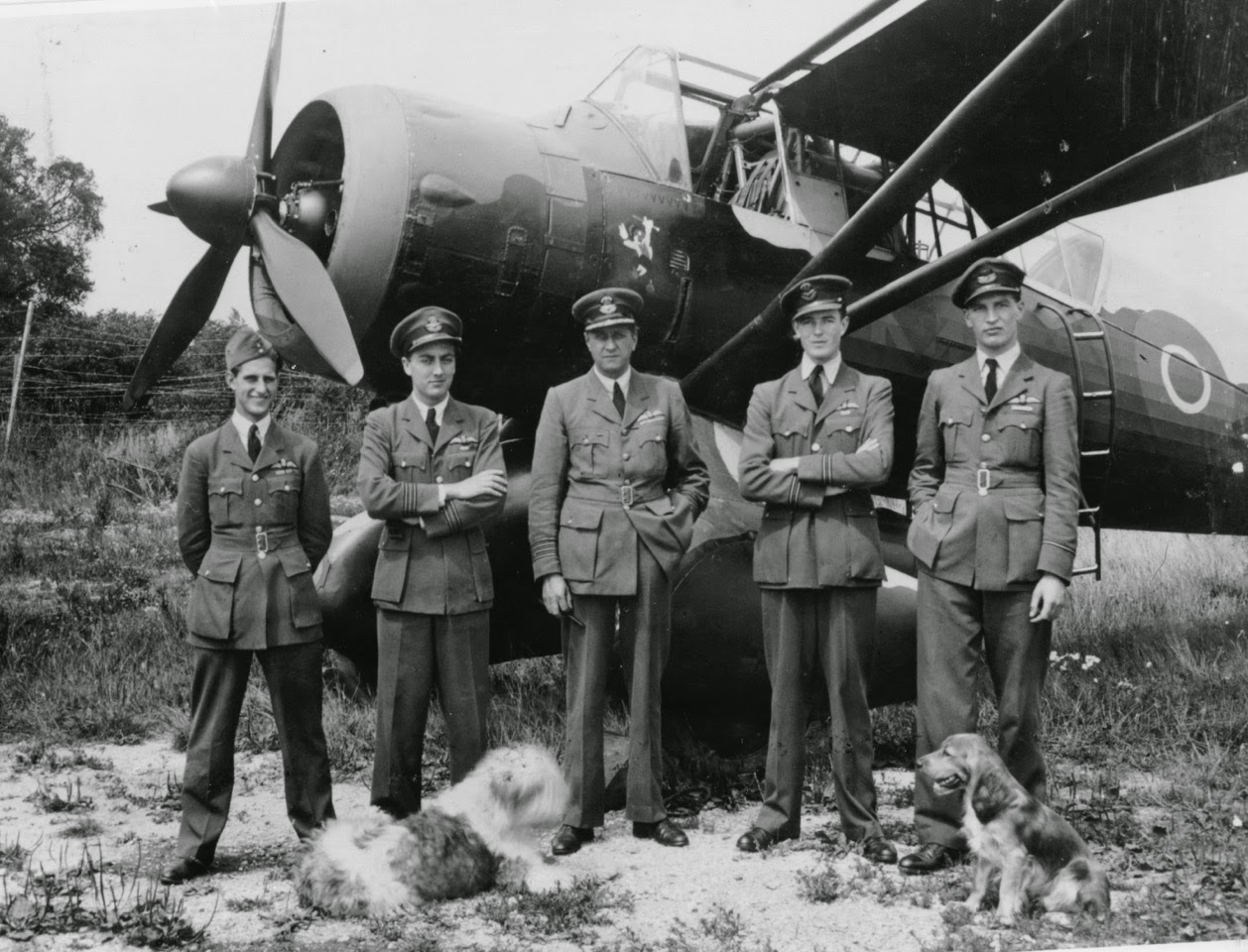
Jim McCairns (left of picture) at Tangmere in 1943 with 161 Squadron

- Anthony Barber, Chancellor of the Exchequer from 1970 to 1974 and Conservative MP
- Wing Commander Edward Barton CBE, electronic engineer and chief signals and radar officer of the RAF Pathfinder Force, helped to develop the Oboe navigation system
- John Hedley Brooke, historian of science
- Dr Michael Clark, Conservative MP
- Doc Cox, musician and former television journalist
- John Glasby, writer
- Sir Stuart Goodwin, industrialist and philanthropist
- Dick Herrick, Anglican priest
- Philip Jackson, actor
- Frank Fairbairn Laming, Anglican priest
- Jim McCairns pilot
- Samuel Milner, physicist
- Air Marshal Sir Alec Morris KBE, CB, Chief Engineer from 1981 to 1983 of the RAF
- John Pater CB, civil servant largely responsible for creating the NHS (England and Wales) in 1948
- Ian Robinson, literary critic and English lecturer
- John Taylor, publisher, essayist, and writer
- Sir Lionel Thompson CBE, Deputy Master and Comptroller of the Royal Mint from 1950 to 1957
- John Warham, photographer
- Joe Wright CMG, UK Ambassador from 1975–78 to Ivory Coast, Upper Volta and Niger

=== Sir Frederick Milner Secondary Modern (to 1979) ===
- Derek Randall, England cricketer
- Tim Stockdale, equestrian and show-jumper

== See also ==
- The Elizabethan High School – the other Retford comprehensive on Hallcroft Road.
- King Edward VI Grammar School, Retford - London Road
- Retford Post 16 Centre – Post 16 centre run in partnership with The Elizabethan High School
- Listed buildings in Retford
