= Alban Arena =

Theatre and music venue in St Albans, England

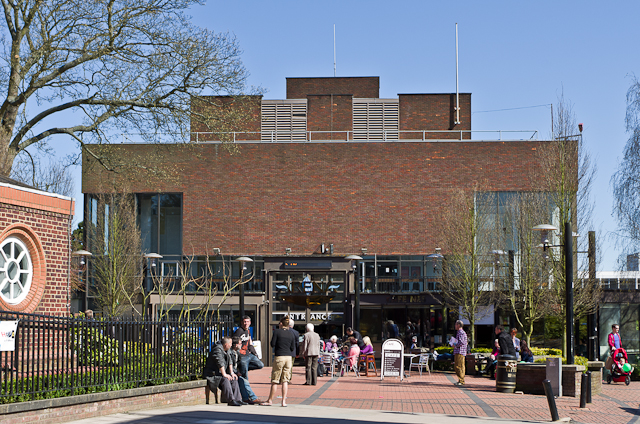
- The Arena in 2013

- Alban Arena on the map of Hertfordshire
- Former names: St Albans City Hall
- Address: Alban Arena, Civic Centre, St Albans Hertfordshire AL1 3LD
- Location: St Albans, United Kingdom
- Coordinates: 51°45′10″N 00°20′11″W
- Capacity: 856 (seated); 1200 (seated & floor space)
- Type: Theatre
- Events: Music, children's entertainment

Construction
- Opened: June 1968
- Architect: Sir Frederick Gibberd

Website
- www.alban-arena.co.uk

Alban Arena (formerly known as St Albans City Hall or Civic Hall) is a theatre and music venue located in St Albans, England.

== History ==
The venue was designed by Sir Frederick Gibberd in the modern style, built in red brick and was officially opened in June 1968. It opened with a performance by blues singer John Mayall, and has staged concerts by bands such as The Who in November 1968, Dire Straits in July 1978 and Jethro Tull in March 2010.

Soon after opening the City Hall began hosting regular "Civic Discos", on Mondays for teenagers and on Saturday nights (with occasional live music) for older patrons. The Monday night disc jockeys included the London impresario "Rocky Rivers" and Jeff Spencer. Later DJs included Graham Kentsley, who hosted a series of events celebrating 50 years of the Civic Disco in aid of the New St Albans Museum, which opened in 2018.

Over the Christmas period of 2004, the pantomime Aladdin was staged at the venue with participation by Michelle Bass. The December 2005 show was Peter Pan, featuring Leslie Grantham and Dani Harmer, and in 2009 the show was The Little Mermaid with Sarah-Jane Honeywell.

In 2007 the St Albans International Organ Festival took place at the arena. (Note: Info from St Albans International Organ Festival#The Fringe)

In December 2021 asbestos was discovered on stage equipment, forcing a temporary closure of the venue.

The venue hosts the annual St Albans Beer & Cider festival, Hertfordshire's biggest beer festival.
