= Dave D'Mello =

British musical artist, DJ and producer

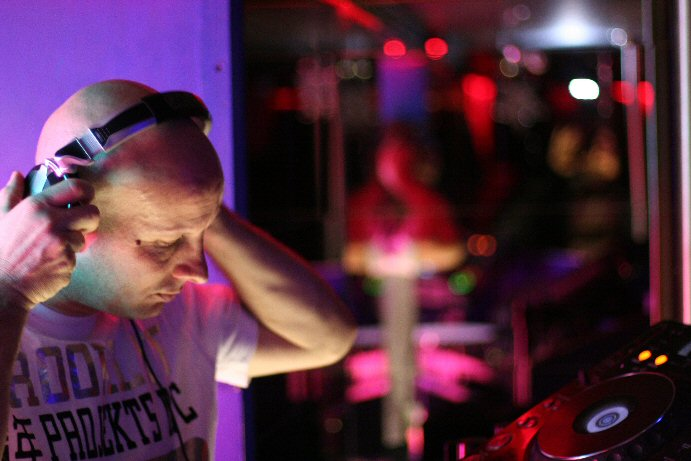
- Dave D'Mello at Mirror Mirror (December 2008)

Background information
- Born: 13 June 1970 (age 56)
- Origin: Maidstone, Kent, England
- Genre: House
- Occupations: Club DJ, Radio DJ, Record Producer
- Instruments: DJ, keyboards
- Labels: Vines Vinyl Records, VVR2
- Website: DaveDMello.co.uk

Dave D'Mello (born as David Anthony Fisher on 13 June 1970) is a British dance music DJ and record producer from Greenhithe, United Kingdom whom started life as a professional / semi professional footballer and was infamously banned for life. As a DJ, he is known for playing dirty, funky house music and often blends elements of funk, rock, and old school. He is also the owner of Vines Vinyl Records and the sister label VVR2.

== Early football career ==
D'Mello was a forward/midfielder who started out as a Gillingham youth team player and signed a professional contract with West Ham United only to have it terminated within a month after being sent off in a friendly. Gained a wealth of Football Conference, Isthmian League and Southern Football League experience with the likes of Erith & Belvedere, Fisher Athletic, Egham Town, Rainham Town, Sittingbourne, Maidstone United, St. Leonards, Clapton, and Purfleet. He also played in the Spanish Fourth Division for Torrevieja. Was banned for life for an incident during a game whilst at Egham Town when the match was abandoned midway through the game. Was released from the Sine Die ban in 2005 at the age of 35 and briefly joined Biggleswade Town in the South Midlands Premier and captained them to a successful season.

Dave is now a UEFA B football coach who runs the Football 1st Academy and scouts for various professional football clubs.

== DJ and producing career ==
Began DJing back in the early 1990s and has had residencies at Pacha, Revolution and ACTV in Spain, The Play Room, Dolce and The Gardening Club in London and Mu Mu's in his hometown of Maidstone. In 2005 Dave set up the independent dance music label Vines Vinyl Records purely for his own experimental hard house sounds, but quickly began signing more vocal based artists to the label. The label has grown considerably in recent years with many artists signed and has now launched a sister label called VVR2 with a totally different direction away from dance music with the signing of many Britain's Got Talent finalists, indie rock bands, and commercial pop stars. In September 2009, D'Mello signed Hollie Steel to his record label VVR2, where she began recording her debut single "Where Are You, Christmas?" from the American film Dr. Seuss' How the Grinch Stole Christmas. The single was released on 14 December 2009.

Tracks from his Innocent Insight album were used in hit U.S. television series FlashForward, which aired for one season on ABC between September 24, 2009, and May 27, 2010.

He has also remixed tracks for mainstream artist's such as MIA, BT, Kadoc, worked with D:Ream on their single "Gods in the Making" and in July 2010 released a collaboration with Jan Johnston called "Remember". Dave has just finished producing a dance album with former CBeebies television presenter Sarah-Jane Honeywell which is due to be released April 2012.

D'Mello was arrested on the 13 August 2011 accused of failing to supply dozens of tickets for that years V Festival, but was found not guilty on all charges at Maidstone Crown Court, on 26 September 2012, when the prosecution offered no evidence.

== Discography ==
=== Dave Fisher ===
- 2007 Vines Vinyl Records Dancin With You
- 2007 Vines Vinyl Records The EP
- 2008 Vines Vinyl Records Exposition Minimale
- 2008 Vines Vinyl Records In Love

=== Dave D'Mello ===
- 2009 Vines Vinyl Records Majestic
- 2009 Vines Vinyl Records When We Touch
- 2009 Vines Vinyl Records Say You Love Me Ft. Tara Verloop
- 2009 Vines Vinyl Records The Phoenix
- 2009 Vines Vinyl Records Now Boy Ft. Kaiya
- 2009 Vines Vinyl Records Tell Me Ft. Tara Verloop
- 2009 Vines Vinyl Records Supreme Being
- 2009 Vines Vinyl Records Fast Cars Ft. Kaiya
- 2010 Vines Vinyl Records I Am Not A Toy
- 2010 Vines Vinyl Records Remember Ft. Jan Johnston
- 2011 Vines Vinyl Records Going Crazy
- 2011 Vines Vinyl Records From Russia With Love
- 2011 Vines Vinyl Records Fucking Big Hole
- 2011 Vines Vinyl Records Just Too Bad
- 2011 Vines Vinyl Records Supreme Being II
- 2013 Vines Vinyl Records Naughty By Nature
- 2013 VVR2 Sharper Than A Heart Attack
- 2014 VVR2 Wintertime
- 2014 VVR2 Delinquent
- 2015 VVR2 Supreme Being III: Heavenly Bodies
- 2015 VVR2 Smokin
- 2015 VVR2 Heart of Asia
- 2015 VVR2 Neon Dreams
- 2017 Electric Boogaloo Records Another Chance
- 2019 Electric Boogaloo Records Moments in Death
- 2019 Electric Boogaloo Records Rain
- 2020 Electric Boogaloo Records Crazy
- 2020 Electric Boogaloo Records Your Love
- 2020 Electric Boogaloo Records She's A Trap
- 2020 Electric Boogaloo Records Don't Go
- 2020 Electric Boogaloo Records Won't You Stay
- 2021 Electric Boogaloo Records The Reason
- 2021 Electric Boogaloo Records Everybody Rocks
- 2021 Electric Boogaloo Records Something Between Us
- 2021 Electric Boogaloo Records That's The Way Love Is
- 2023 Electric Boogaloo Records I Don't Wanna Hear You Say
- 2023 Electric Boogaloo Records I Don't Wanna Hear You Say: The Remixes

=== Dave D'Mello ===
- 2009 Vines Vinyl Records Innocent Insight
- 2014 VVR2 The Definitive D'Mello: Dreams, Demons & Dares
- 2020 Electric Boogaloo Records Delight
