= Sarah-Jane Honeywell =

English television presenter and singer (born 1974)

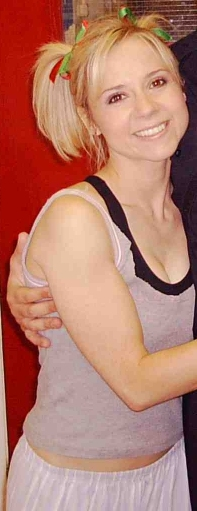
- Honeywell in 2006
- Born: 5 January 1974 (age 52); Worksop, Nottinghamshire, England
- Occupations: Actress; television presenter; radio presenter; singer
- Known for: CBeebies, Tikkabilla, radio work on BBC Radio Lincolnshire, BBC Radio Humberside and Magna Radio.
- Spouse: Ayden Callaghan
- Children: 2

Sarah-Jane Honeywell (born 5 January 1974) is an English actress, writer, TV and radio presenter, drama teacher and singer. She is best known for her work on the CBeebies television channel and her radio shows on BBC Radio Lincolnshire and Magna Radio.

As well as appearing on pre-school TV, Honeywell is a supporter of Bristol City F.C. and writes a regular column in the Ashton Gate Stadium match day programme 'Well Red'. Honeywell is a vegan, and does charity work for Dogs Trust. Fairies being her website and personal symbol, she also has a fairy-wings tattoo.

In December 2006, Honeywell released an EP titled Love and Magic. The second track "Believe in Magic" was released as a single, and the music video was made at the annual Goose Fair in Nottingham, 2007. A Sarah-Jane plush doll was released to coincide with the EP. The songs from the EP featured in the CBeebies Live tour and the production of Peter Pan at the Capitol Theatre, Horsham.

In April 2021, Sarah-Jane joined BBC Radio Lincolnshire, in which she presented a weekly 80s and 90s music show every Sunday afternoon. The show was also broadcast on BBC Radio Humberside. She also presented Sunday breakfast on Lincolnshire until 21 October 2023. In November 2026, Sarah-Jane joined Magna Radio in Lincolnshire to host weekend breakfast.

== Biography ==
=== Early career ===
When Honeywell was young she went to dance school and gymnastics classes. She completed her education at Ordsall Hall School. At 18, she got her first job, working in Malta as a contortionist for three months, having trained with acrobatic troupe the Great Kovaks in Doncaster. At 19, she moved to London to play the part of a kitten in Cats, and from musical theatre moved into television.

=== Later career ===
Honeywell has acted in several leading theatre productions including The Little Mermaid at the Alban Arena, Peter Pan at Southend, Woking, Southampton, Wimbledon and Horsham, the 2004–05 and 2006–07 CBEEBIES Live! National Arena Tours and the Fimbles National Tour 2006. She also appeared in Falstaff at the Royal Opera House, has played a wide range of characters in television dramas and commercials, and continues to do aerial and skin work. She has also performed a solo show "Love & Magic" at venues across the UK and Europe and appeared in an independent film called Shadows of a Stranger (2014).

In August 2011, Sarah-Jane's "wholesome" image came under scrutiny when she controversially appeared on celebrity photographer Marc de Groot's Facebook page, pouring Diet Coke over an almost see-through vest and posing wearing candyfloss "underwear". Three months later, she posed topless for PETA to mark World Vegan Day. "Going vegan is the best decision I've ever made – I have tons of energy, and I know that I'm not contributing to animal suffering", Honeywell said. "A vegan diet is good for your health, for the environment and for animals – and there's no better time to switch than on World Vegan Day!" Honeywell said in December 2021 that she believed it was this photoshoot that led to her being let go from CBeebies.

Honeywell completed a dance album with record producer Dave D'Mello that was released in April 2012. In 2019, she opened up and runs a theatre school in Lincoln in which she helps young people with classes and shows. In April 2021, Sarah-Jane joined BBC Radio Lincolnshire, in which she presents a weekly 80s and 90s music show every Sunday afternoon 2-6pm. She also presented Sunday breakfast on the station until 21 October 2023.

Honeywell was an additional puppeteer on the 2019 Netflix series The Dark Crystal: Age of Resistance.

In February 2024, Honeywell revealed in an interview in detail about her sacking from her role on CBeebies, saying that she had 'thoughts about jumping in front of a train' due to online hate after her photoshoot was published in national newspapers in 2011.

== Personal life ==
On 17 May 2015, Sarah-Jane and her fiancé, Hollyoaks actor Ayden Callaghan, announced they were expecting their first child. Their son, Phoenix, was born on 25 August 2015. Sarah-Jane and Ayden were then married on 17 October 2016. They announced on 5 September 2017 that they were expecting their second child and another son, Indiana was born on 24 January 2018.

Honeywell previously blogged about her life as a mother under the name "honeymumster". Despite her vegan views, she decided not to raise her children as vegan, stating in an interview on Good Morning Britain in March 2019: "I don't want to put my views on my children. I don't think you should put your religious, dietary or political views on your children, I think we have children to guide them to their own destinations, not my destination [...] but I will tell them the truth [when] they're ready, and then they can make their own decisions". Honeywell's husband Callaghan eats meat.

== Notable appearances ==
Year	Media	Part	Production	Production company
2026-present	Radio	Weekend Breakfast Presenter	Magna Radio	
2021–2023	Radio	Sunday Afternoon Presenter	BBC Radio Lincolnshire	BBC
2010	Television	Presenter	Mighty Mites	CBeebies/BBC
2010	Television	Panzee	ZingZillas	CBeebies/BBC
2009	Stage	Ariel	The Little Mermaid	Qdos & Alban Arena, St Albans
2008	Stage	Peter Pan	Peter Pan	Horsham Theatre
2007	Stage	Glinda	Wizard of Oz	New World Productions
2006	Stage	Host	Fimbles Live!	Fiery Angel & Novel
2006–2007	Television	Links Presenter	CBeebies Presentation	CBeebies/BBC
2005–2006	Stage	Co-host	CBeebies Live! Arena Tour	BBC Worldwide
2005	Stage	Co-host	Tweenies and Friends Show	Iain Lauchlan & BBC Worldwide
2002–2005	Television	Presenter	Tikkabilla/Higgledy House	BBC
2004–2005	Stage/Pantomime	Peter Pan	Peter Pan	Qdos @ Mayflower Southampton
2001–2002	Stage/Musical	Etcetera (cat)	CATS – London	Cameron Mackintosh
1999	Stage/Opera	Aerialist/Acrobat	Falstaff	The Royal Opera House @ Covent Garden
