= Eddie Calvert =

English trumpeter (1922–1978)

Background information
- Also known as: Richard Bryce
- Born: Albert Edward Calvert; 15 March 1922; Preston, Lancashire, England
- Died: 7 August 1978 (aged 56) Rivonia, Johannesburg, South Africa
- Genres: Easy listening
- Instrument: Trumpet
- Years active: 1951–1978
- Labels: Columbia, His Master's Voice, Melodisc

Albert Edward Calvert (15 March 1922 – 7 August 1978) was an English trumpeter successful in the 1950s. Between 1953 and 1958 he achieved seven instrumental hits on the UK Singles Chart, including the two chart-toppers "Oh, Mein Papa" in 1954 and "Cherry Pink (and Apple Blossom White)" in 1955.

== Biography ==
Calvert was born in Preston, Lancashire, England and grew up in a family where the music of his local brass band featured highly. He was soon able to play a variety of instruments but was most accomplished on the trumpet. At the age of 11 he joined the Preston Town Silver Band. After the Second World War, invalided out of the Army, he borrowed money from his father to get his first job in a Manchester band and graduated from playing as an amateur in brass bands to professional engagements with popular dance orchestras of the day, including Geraldo's plus Billy Ternent, and he soon became renowned for the virtuosity of his performances. Following his exposure on television with the Stanley Black Orchestra, an enthusiastic announcer introduced him as the "Man with the Golden Trumpet" – an apt description that remained with him for the rest of his musical career.

Calvert's style was unusually individualistic, and he became a familiar musician on BBC Radio and TV during the 1950s. He first recorded for Melodisc c. 1949–1951 before he started to record for EMI's Columbia label and his records included two UK number ones, "Oh, Mein Papa" and, more than a year later, "Cherry Pink and Apple Blossom White". He was the first British instrumentalist to achieve two number ones. "Oh, Mein Papa" topped the UK Singles Chart for nine weeks (then a UK chart record), and he received the first gold disc awarded for a UK instrumental track. The record also sold well in the United States, reached No. 6 on the Billboard charts.

Further chart entries were "John and Julie", taken from the soundtrack of the film John and Juliet, "Zambesi" and "Mandy", his last major hit. Other recordings included "Stranger in Paradise" (1955), "The Man with the Golden Arm" (1956) and "Jealousy" (1960). Calvert co-wrote the song "My Son, My Son", which was a hit for Vera Lynn in 1954. In spite of being an instrumental, his theme music for the film The Man with the Golden Arm was banned by the BBC "due to its connection with a film about drugs".

In 1956, he was invited by orchestra leader Norrie Paramor and their mutual friends Ruby Murray and Michael Holliday to record an extended-play single with four tracks. Calvert played "Silent Night" and on another track he, Murray and Holliday teamed up in a version of "Good Luck, Good Health, God Bless You". The single, released by Columbia Records, achieved some success in Britain, but was more popular in Australia and South Africa.

As music began to change in the 1960s with the worldwide popularity of groups like the Beatles and the rock n' roll genre, Calvert's musical renditions became less popular among record buyers. By 1968, Calvert had become disillusioned with life under the Labour government of Harold Wilson and was especially critical of London's policy towards Rhodesia. After a world tour that included several stops in Africa, he left the UK, making South Africa his home. He continued to perform there, and was a regular visitor to Rhodesia. He continued to record for the local market and performed a version of "Amazing Grace", retitled "Amazing Race", specially adapted for Rhodesia.

In 1974, Calvert became Chief promoter for the Cultural Section of the West Rand Bantu Affairs Administration Board. His mission was to improve the entertainment scene in Soweto, improving the venues, booking top talent and ensuring promoters acted fairly. In an interview with the Sunday Times he said "From now on, no black artist will be exploited by a white promoter. Any white promoter found in Soweto will be arrested". Not all artistes were in favour of the proposals saying the board was acting with an 'iron hand', but Calvert insisted that he would stop at nothing to give Soweto the best in entertainment. Calvert also supported many multi-racial causes, including performing at a charity fundraising concert for the Drakensberg children's charity.

On 7 August 1978, Calvert collapsed and died of a heart attack in the bathroom of his home in Rivonia, Johannesburg. He was 56 years old.

== Early recordings ==
- Melodisc – 78 rpm (c. 1949–1951)
  - 1022 Eddie Calvert & His Rumba Band – "Miserlou" / Eddie Calvert & Orchestra – "Hora Samba"
  - 1023 Eddie Calvert & Orchestra – "Gypsy Lullaby" / "Son Mambo"
  - 1178 Eddie Calvert & Orchestra – "With A Song in My Heart" / "Kiss Me Again"
- Melodisc 45 rpm EP (c. 1955)
  - EPM 7–58 Eddie Calvert and His Rumba Band – Eddie Calvert Plays Latin American – "Miserlou" / "Hora Samba" / "Gypsy Lullaby" / "Son Mambo"

== UK singles chart discography ==
- "Oh, Mein Papa" (No. 1) – 1953
- "Cherry Pink and Apple Blossom White" (No.1) – 1955
- "Stranger in Paradise" (No. 14) – 1955
- "John and Julie" (No. 6) – 1955
- "Zambesi" (No.13) – 1956
- "Mandy (La Panse)" (No. 9) – 1958
- "Little Serenade" (No. 28) – 1958

== See also ==
- List of artists who reached number one on the UK singles chart
- List of people from Preston
- UK singles chart records and statistics
