= Retford King Edward VI Grammar School =

Defunct school in England

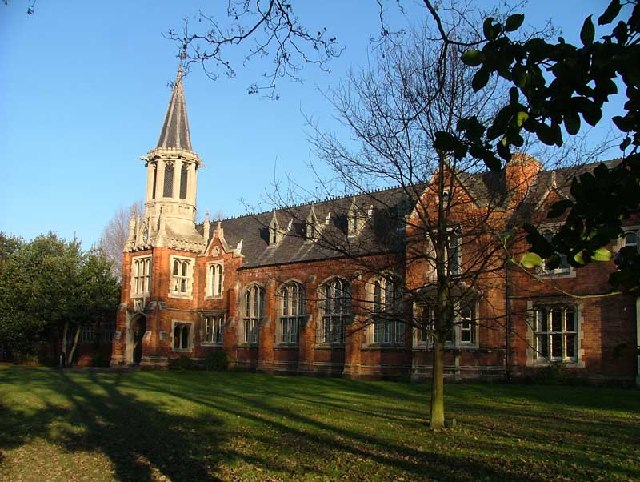
- The historic Edward VI Grammar School buildings in Retford, designed by Decimus Burton
- Retford; England

Information
- School type: Grammar School
- Motto: Ex pulvere palma (Out of the dust, the palm)
- Established: 1857
- Closed: 2003

Retford King Edward VI Grammar School was a grammar school opened on London Road, Retford, Nottinghamshire, in 1857, after being moved from an older site in Chapelgate. The school closed down in 2003.

The school motto Ex pulvere palma means (loosely): "out of the dust (of competition) (comes) the palm" (of victory)

== History ==
The school, which was located on London Road site was opened in 1857 with buildings designed by builder Decimus Burton. Consisting of only one schoolroom originally, the school later built a library, head master's house later to house the school office, and head master's office.

In 1890, an adjoining gymnasium was added, with above it a large projection room. 1906 meant the erection of, along the Dominie Cross Road, several ‘temporary’ buildings, which included the so-called "Tin Tab".

In 1912, the school pupils, like those of many other schools of the day, donated monies to fund dogs for the 1912 Arctic expedition of Robert Falcon Scott.

The Fives Court was gifted in 1924 in the memory of William Eyre a fallen World War 1 casualty. In 1926 a new block of classrooms was opened containing the first library. The iron guttering still bears that date in 2019.

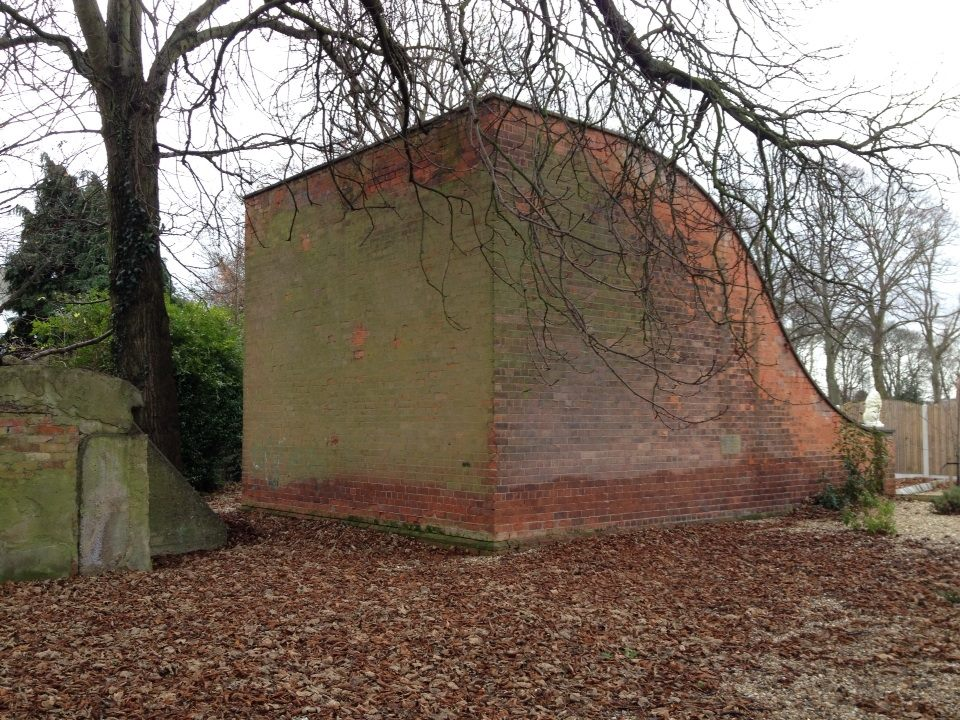
The fives court in 2016 before its redevelopment repaint

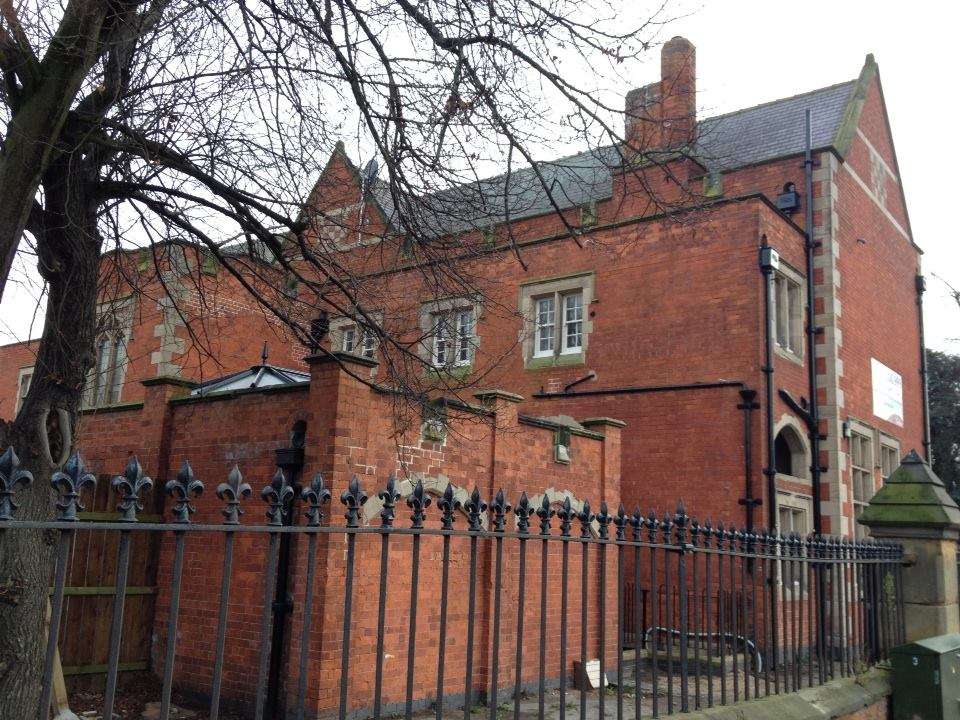
The 1926 extension, a "New Block" in its time, photographed in 2016.

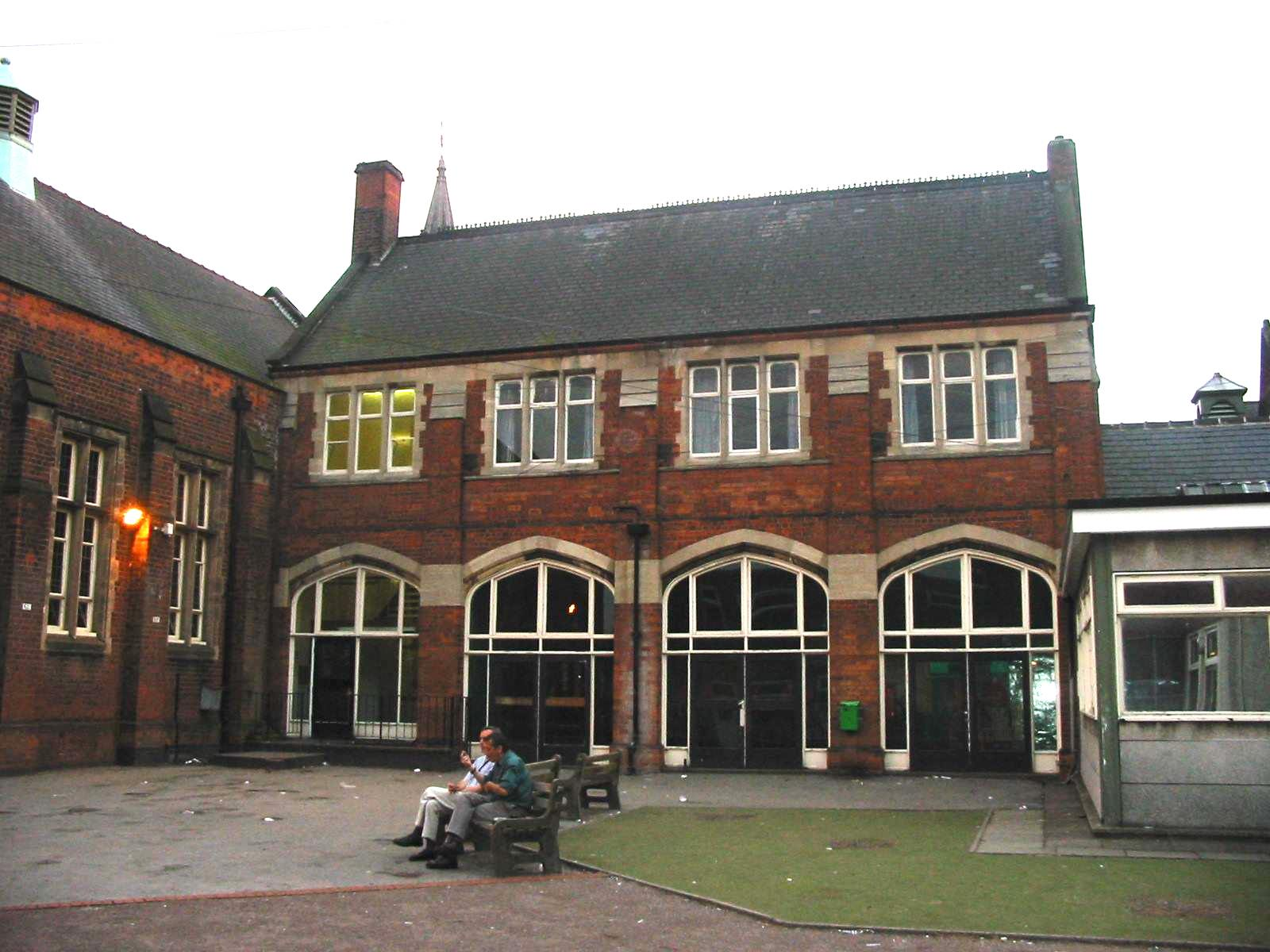
King Edward VI Grammar School dining hall

In 1937, a new Assembly hall was added.

== Pre-War ==
Period	Masters	Links
1910	Mr Watson, Mr Waterhouse, Mr Davies	Worksop Guardian, "Here we went" article

Period	Pupils	Links
1906	Dimock	Our Nottinghamshire, Sherwood Rangers.
1909	White	Nottinghamshire County Council, Roll of Honour
1928	Pringle	Flight Lieutenant 37299 115 Sqdn., Royal Air Force

== War Time ==
Many ex-pupils of the school served in the armed forces during the 1st World War and details of some those can be found in the online Great War Forum.

During the 2nd World War, pupils from Great Yarmouth were relocated to Retford Grammar School

== Post War ==
The Headmaster from 1926 to 1950 was Charles William Pilkington-Rogers (MA BSc FCP), a Cambridge Mathematics graduate, whose teaching career began in 1903 as Science and Mathematics Master at Dunheved College in Launceston, Cornwall.

Squash courts were opened in 1957 and in 1958 a new gymnasium was constructed. In 1958, a new modern (CLASP) science block was added. At the same time, on the opposite side of the playing field, a new single storey art block was also constructed. In 1967 the school received its own astrological observatory, built by local enthusiasts and opened by the astronomer Patrick Moore.

In 1976 a new Sixth Form Block was added at the end of the Hall, and opposite the Cloisters (source Christopher Trend 1970–1977).

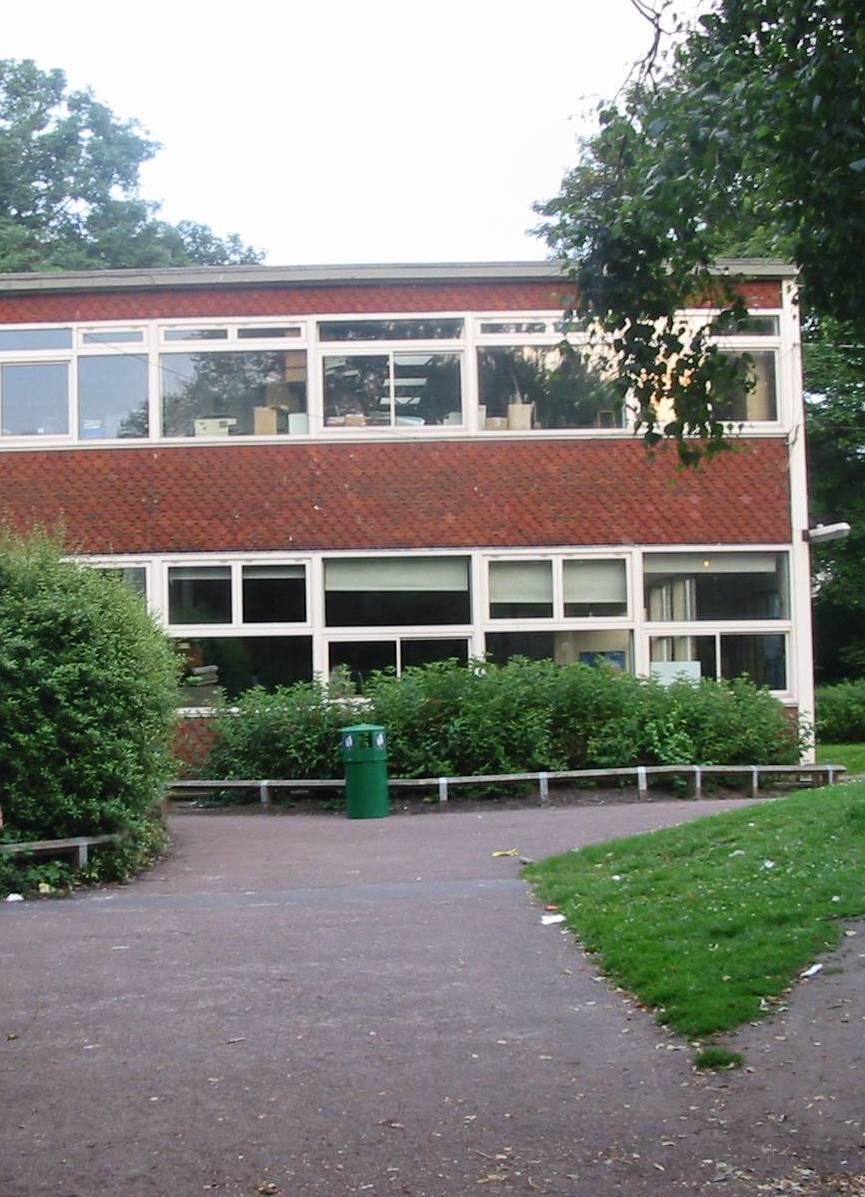
The new science block, built in 1958, pictured in 2003, before its demolition in about 2012

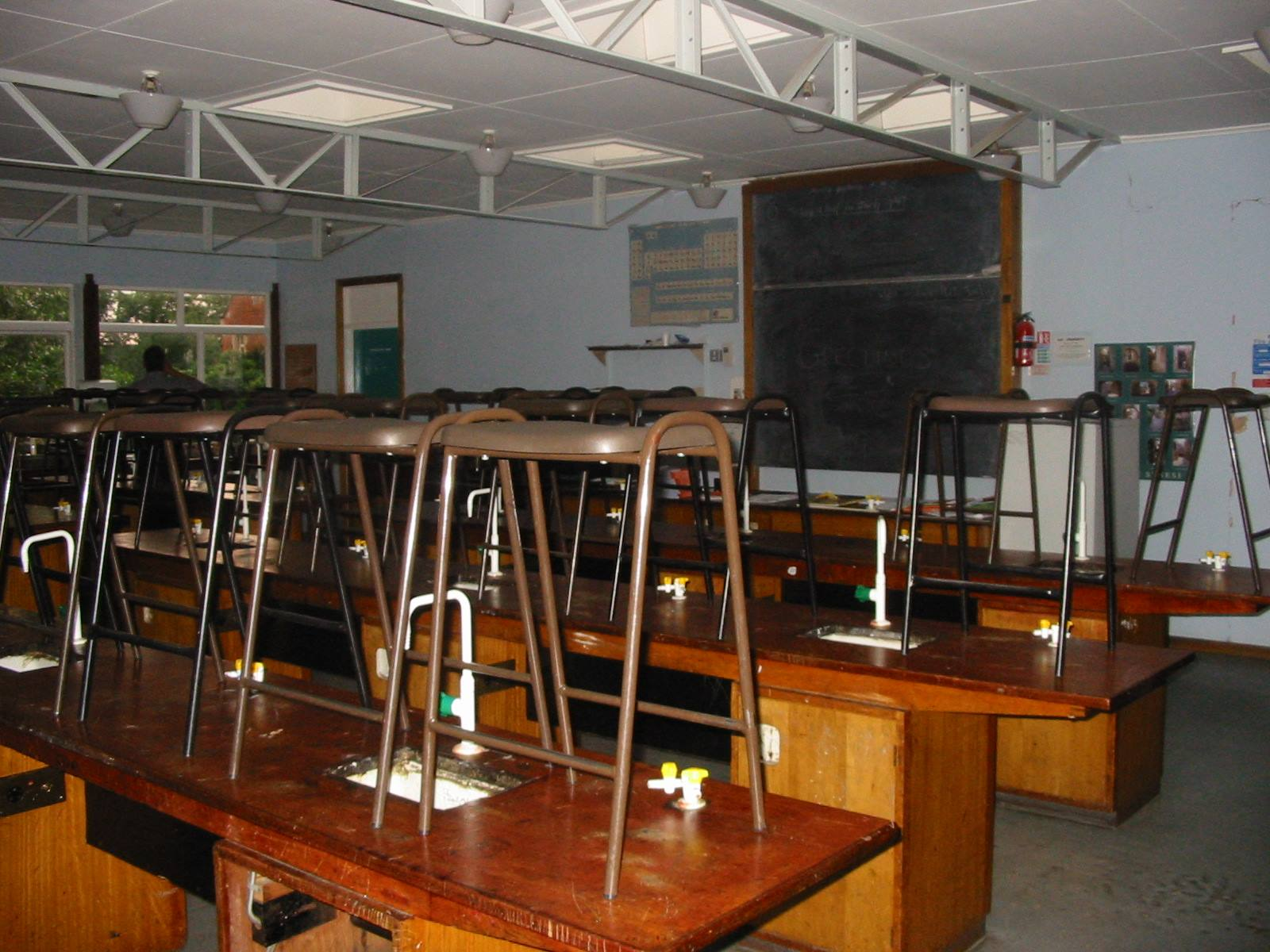
Inside one of the four new science laboratories

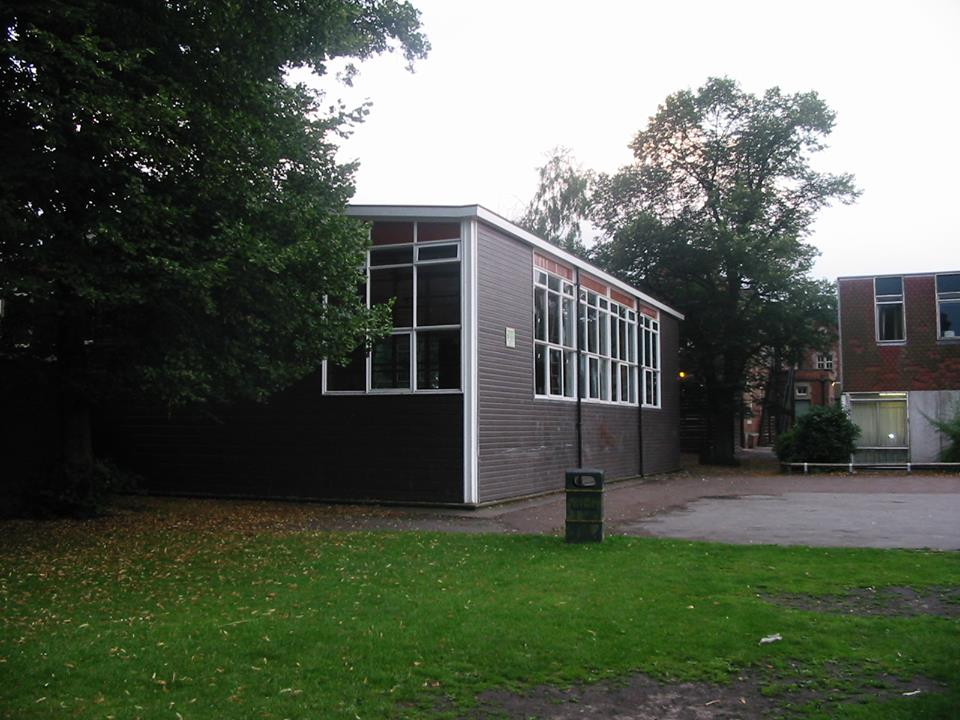
Gymnasium built in 1958, photographed 2003, and demolished c 2012.

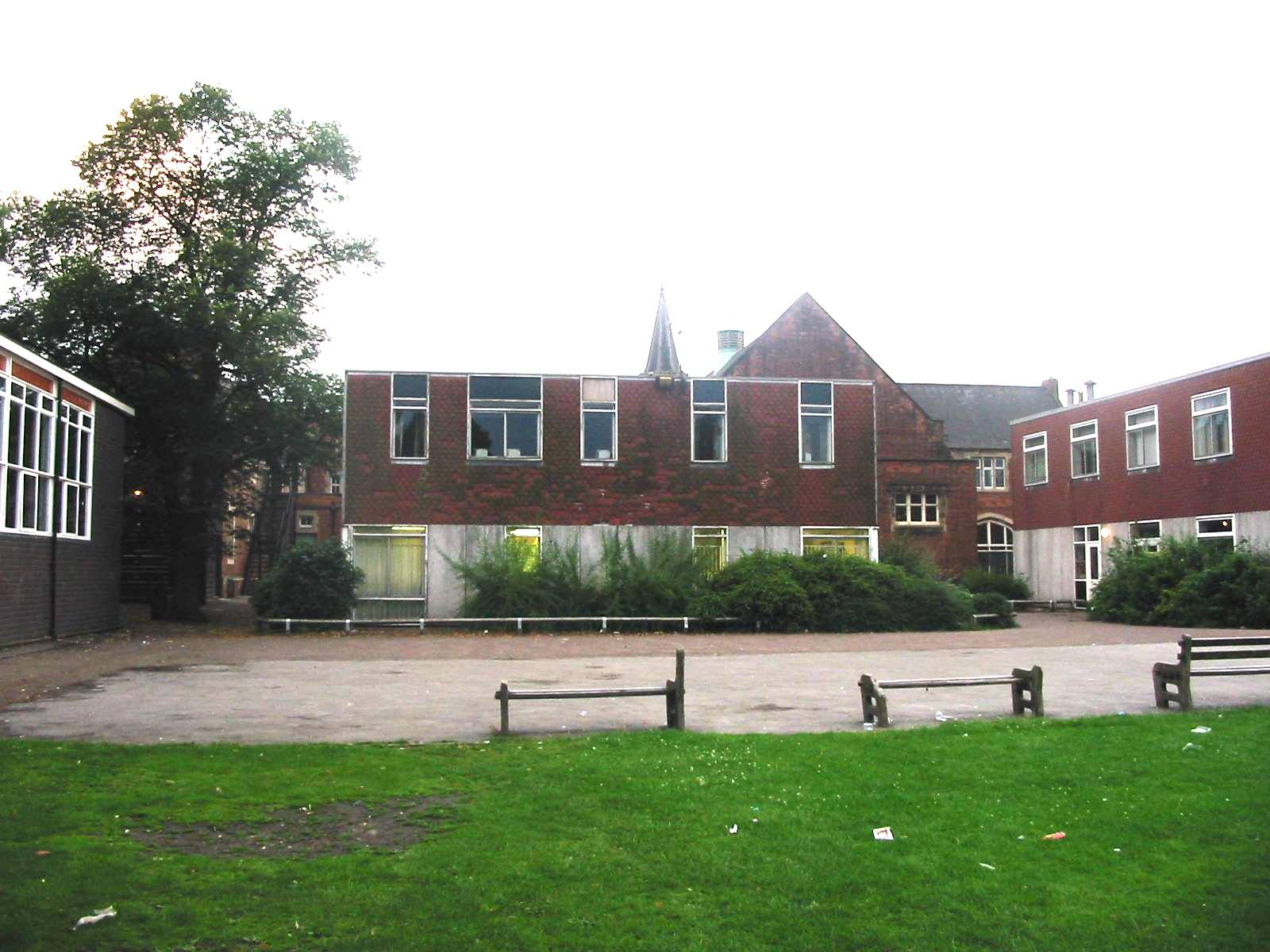
The Sixth Form Block photographed in 2003.

Period	Masters	Links
1963	Bramma	Dictionary of Composers for the Church in Great Britain and Ireland

Period	Pupils	Links
1963	Olson	Retford Grammar School 1963? Upper Science Six
1976	Watson	"a grammar school dropout"

The (mainly) complete and original class listings 1954-1977 have now been recovered from the Nottingham Inspire archive, and, with the permission and appropriate publishing fees, shared at http://www.oldretfordians.org.uk

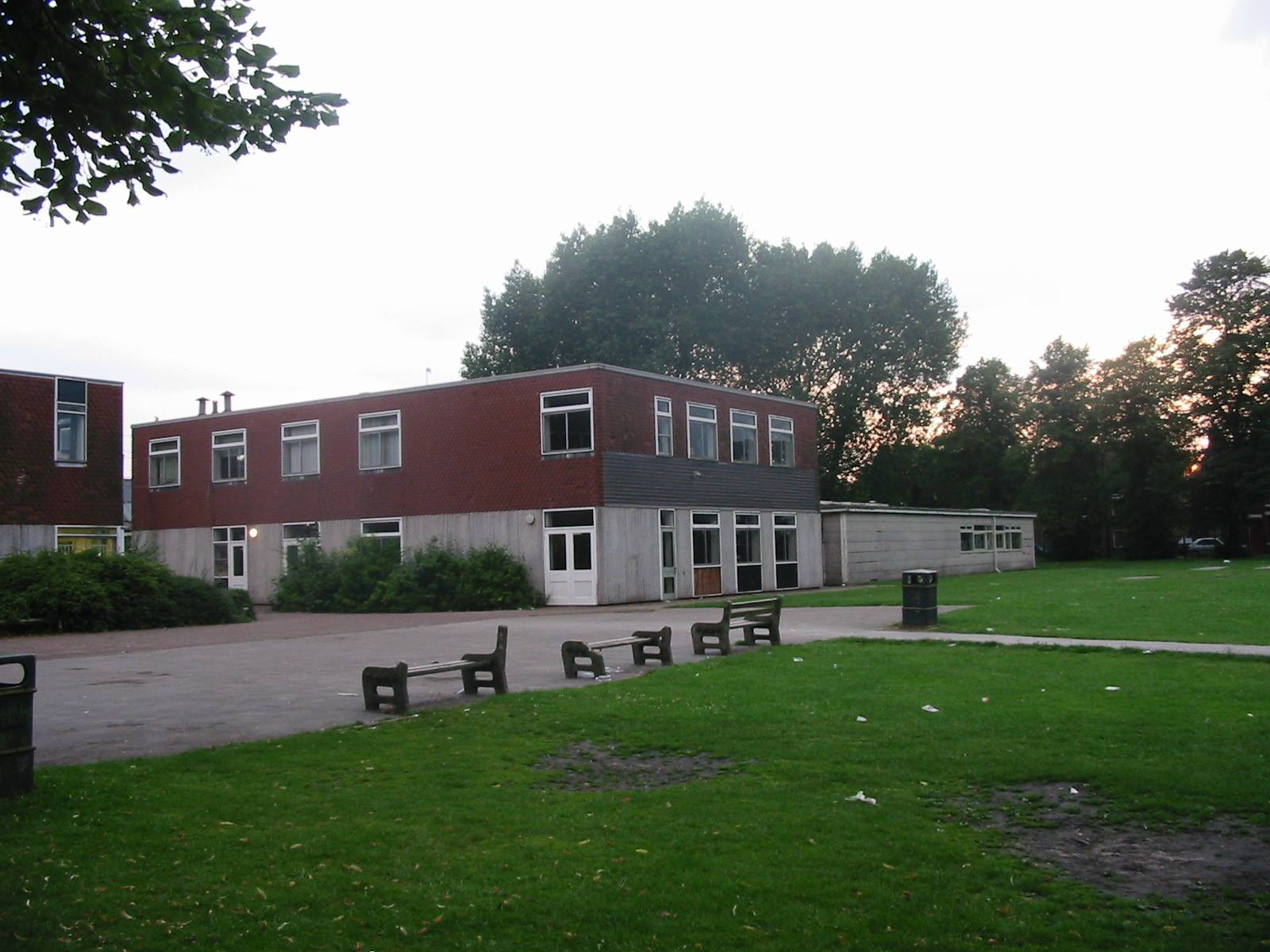
The new maths and craft block opened in 1979 and later demolished in about 2012 to make way for the residential development

In 1979 several more new buildings were added. A new music block was added between the New Block, now becoming known as the Old Block, and the main school building. Also in the same year, a large new multidisciplinary block housing on the ground floor, wood and metal workshops, and upstairs a suite of domestic science kitchens and the Mathematics department.

== The Retfordian ==
For many years, at least between 1913 and the 1950s, events and life at the school were chronicled in the school's own publication, The Retfordian.

A growing number of Retfordian magazines are now published, with the consent and assistance of the Nottinghamshire archives, at http://www.oldretfordians.org.uk

== Final Grammar School days ==
In 1979, after the inclusion of King Edward VI Grammar School and the High School in parliamentary discussion, Retford King Edward VI Grammar School, and Sir Frederick Milner's School were merged into King Edward VI Comprehensive School. At the point of the merger in 1979 with the Frederick Milner School, many of the school records were deposited with the National Archives.

In January 1998, Rosemary Salisbury became one of the final headteachers of what was now known simply as the King Edward VI School and the first woman to do so.

== Closure ==
In the 21st century, the school was scheduled for closure. It closed in 2003.

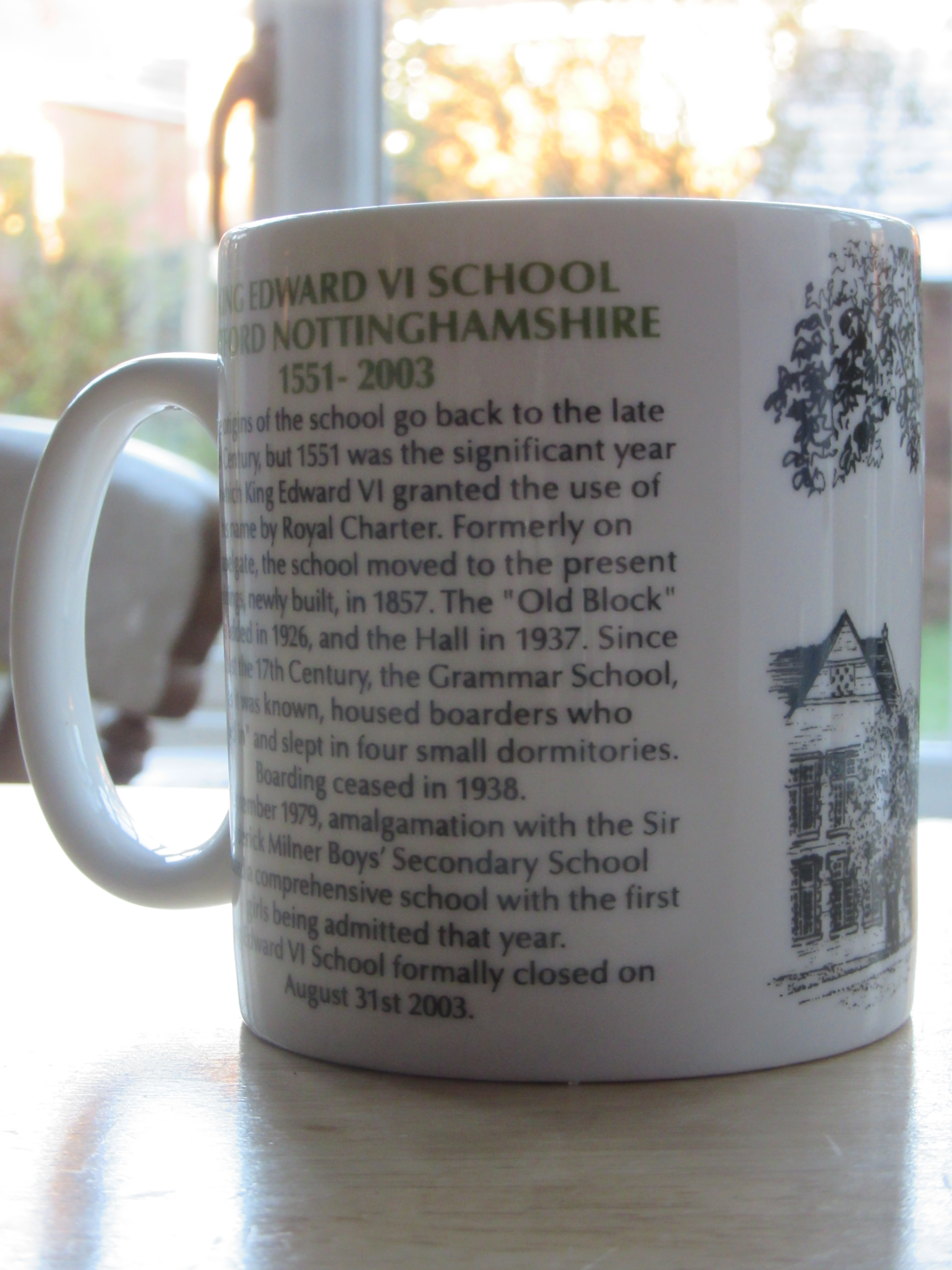
One of the ceramic mugs made to commemorate the closure of Retford King Edward VI (Grammar) School in 2003

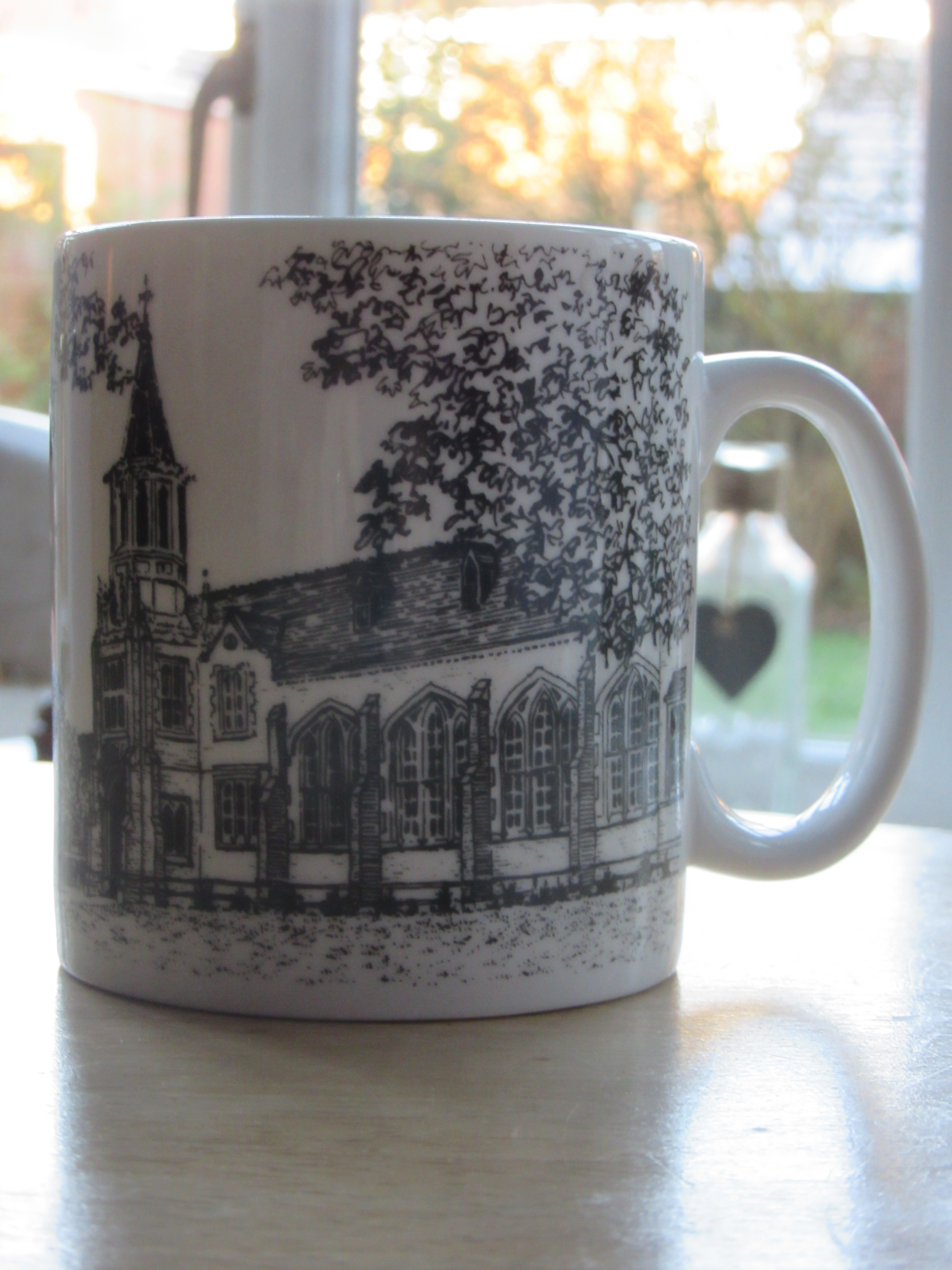
The front of the mug features the original building designed by Decimus Burton

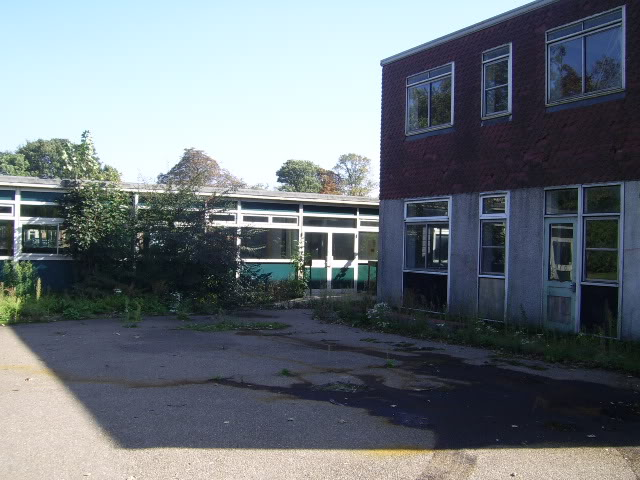
1950 art block and 1970s craft block in 2011 before their demolition

The school was formally replaced by the new Retford Oaks Academy opened in 2003.

The school stood empty for a number of years after closure, these pictures from Urbanography showing the last wall displays still in place from its final days. The pictures at urban exploration site 28 Days Later include a rare 2011 picture of the entrance to the new music rooms internally linking the original school and New Block opened in 1978, and later demolished during redevelopment.

== Redevelopment ==
The old school buildings were eventually sold for redevelopment circa 2011.

During the demolition of the newer building to the rear of the school in 2012, problems were encountered with the disposal of asbestos contained in them.

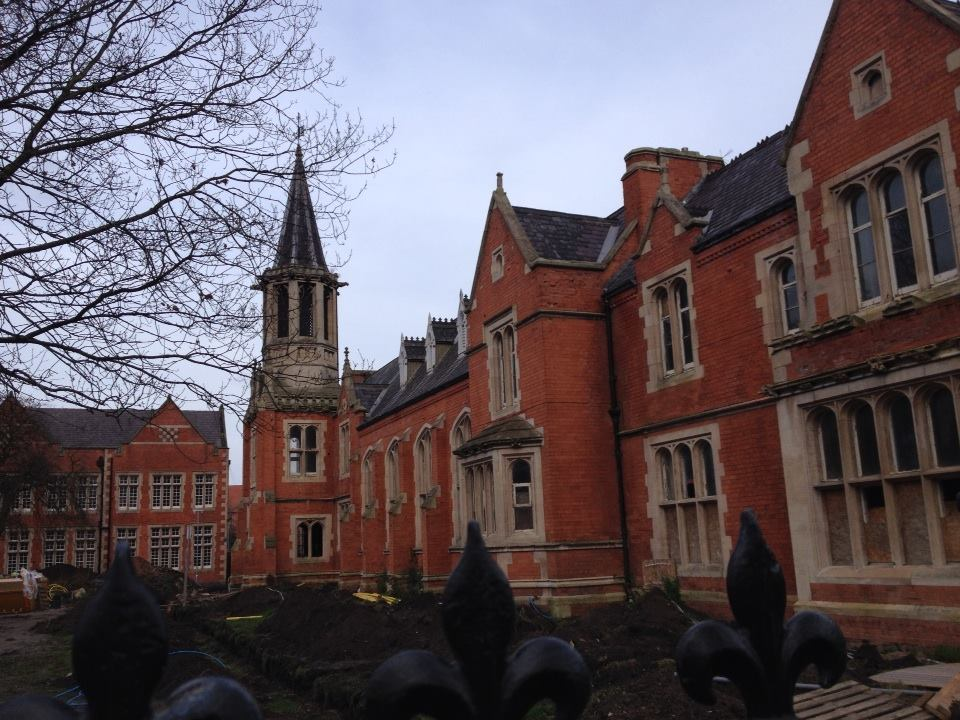
Retford King Edward VI Grammar School under redevelopment in 2016.

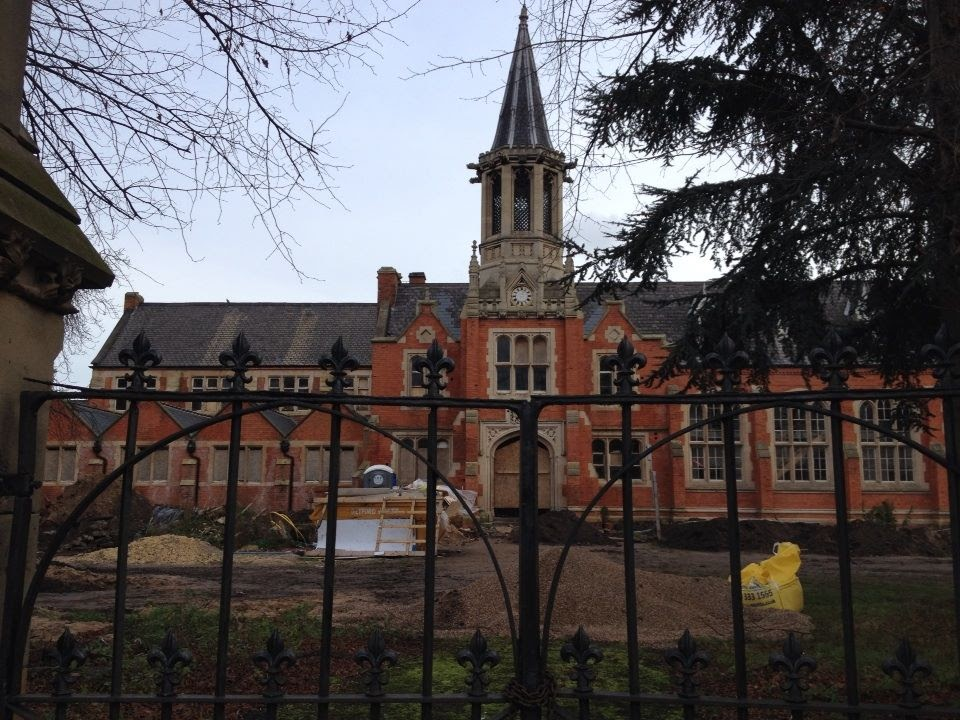
Retford King Edward VI Grammar School under redevelopment in 2016.

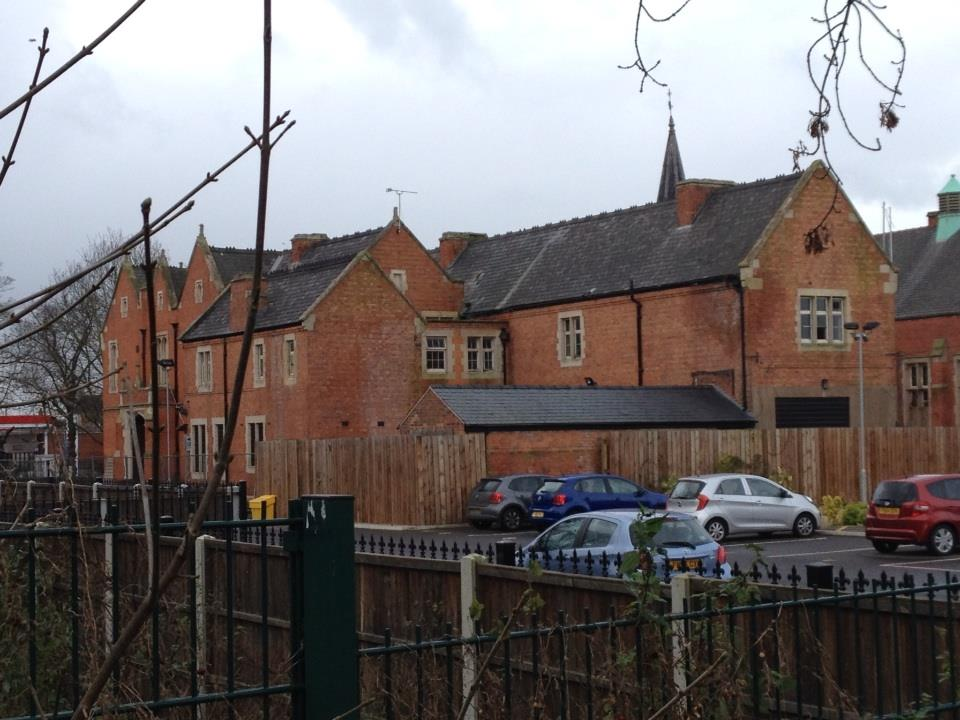
Retford King Edward VI Grammar School without the 1958 science block.

The architects for the redevelopment were Rayner Davies.

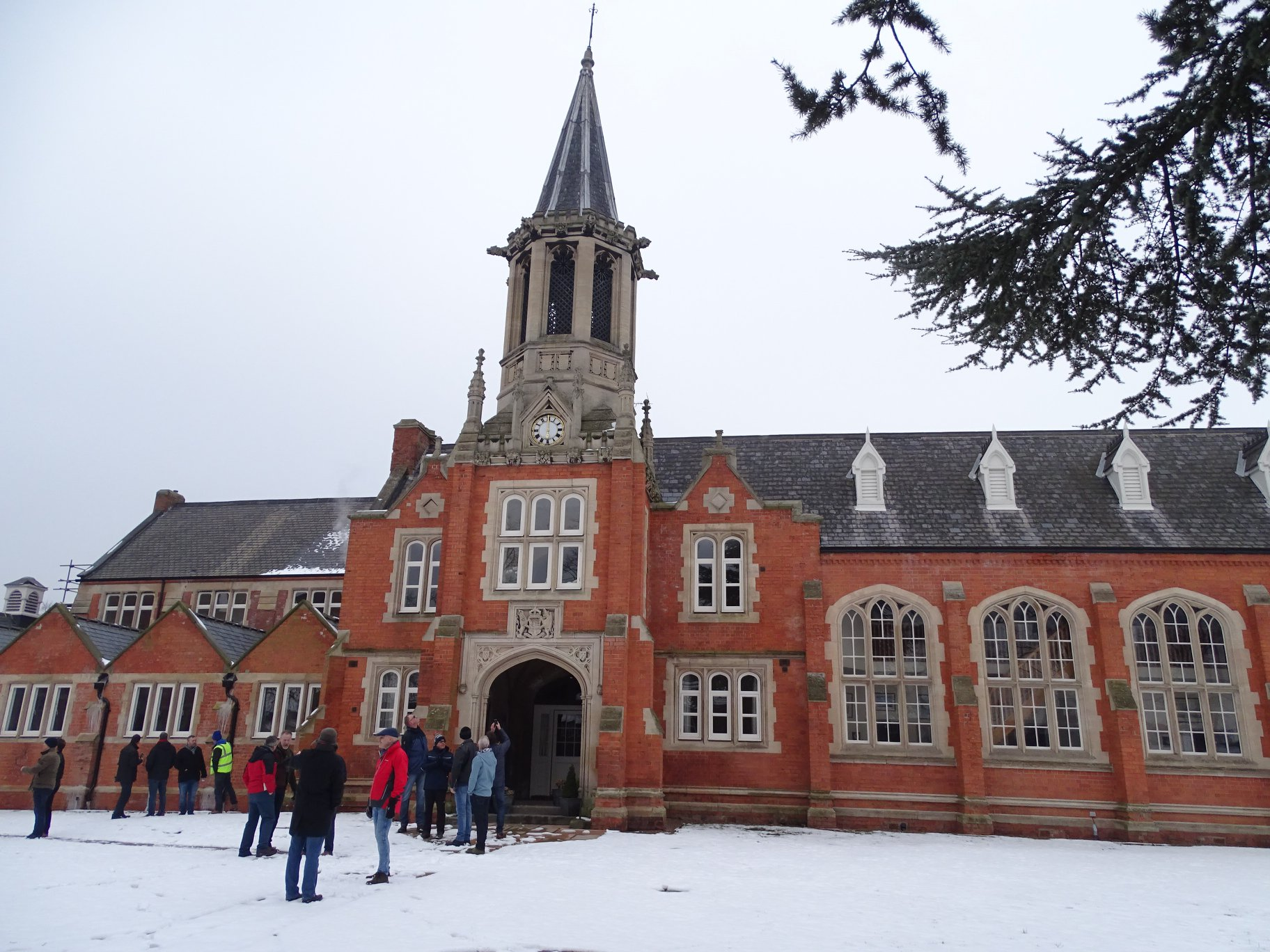
Retford King Edward VI School under redevelopment in 2018. Photograph by Philip Snowden.

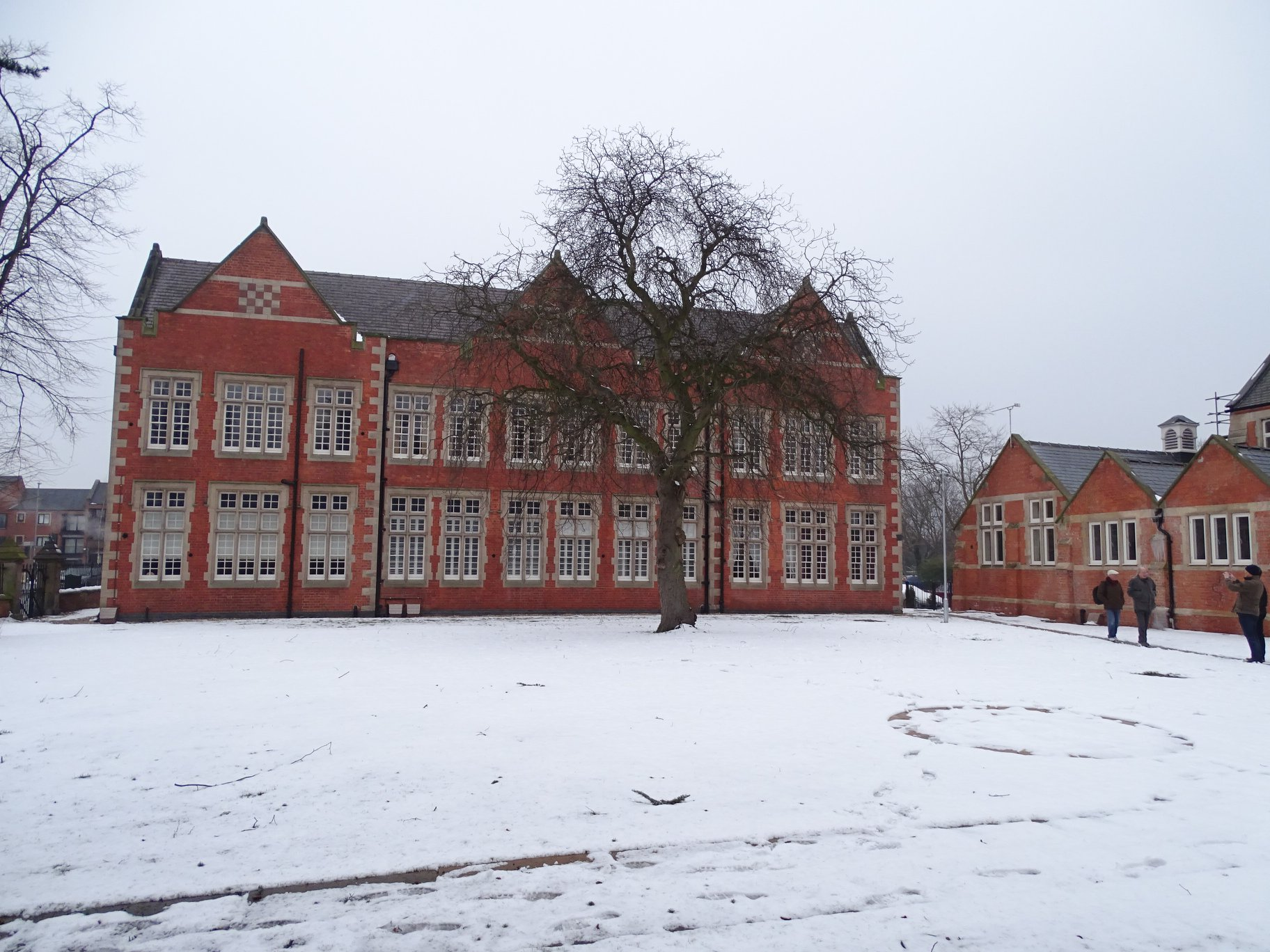
Retford King Edward VI School under redevelopment in 2018. Photograph by Philip Snowden.

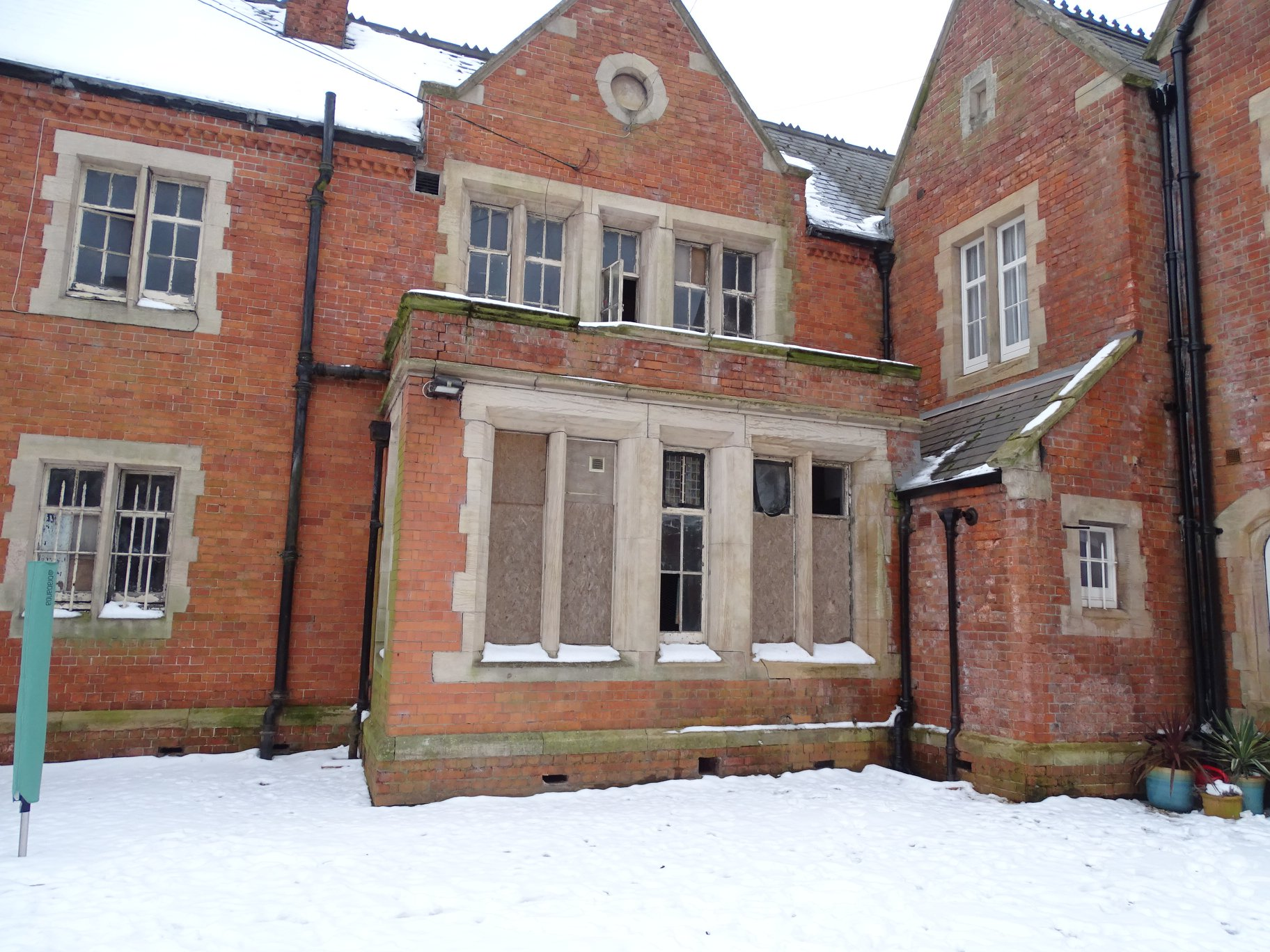
Retford King Edward VI School under redevelopment in 2018. Photograph by Philip Snowden.
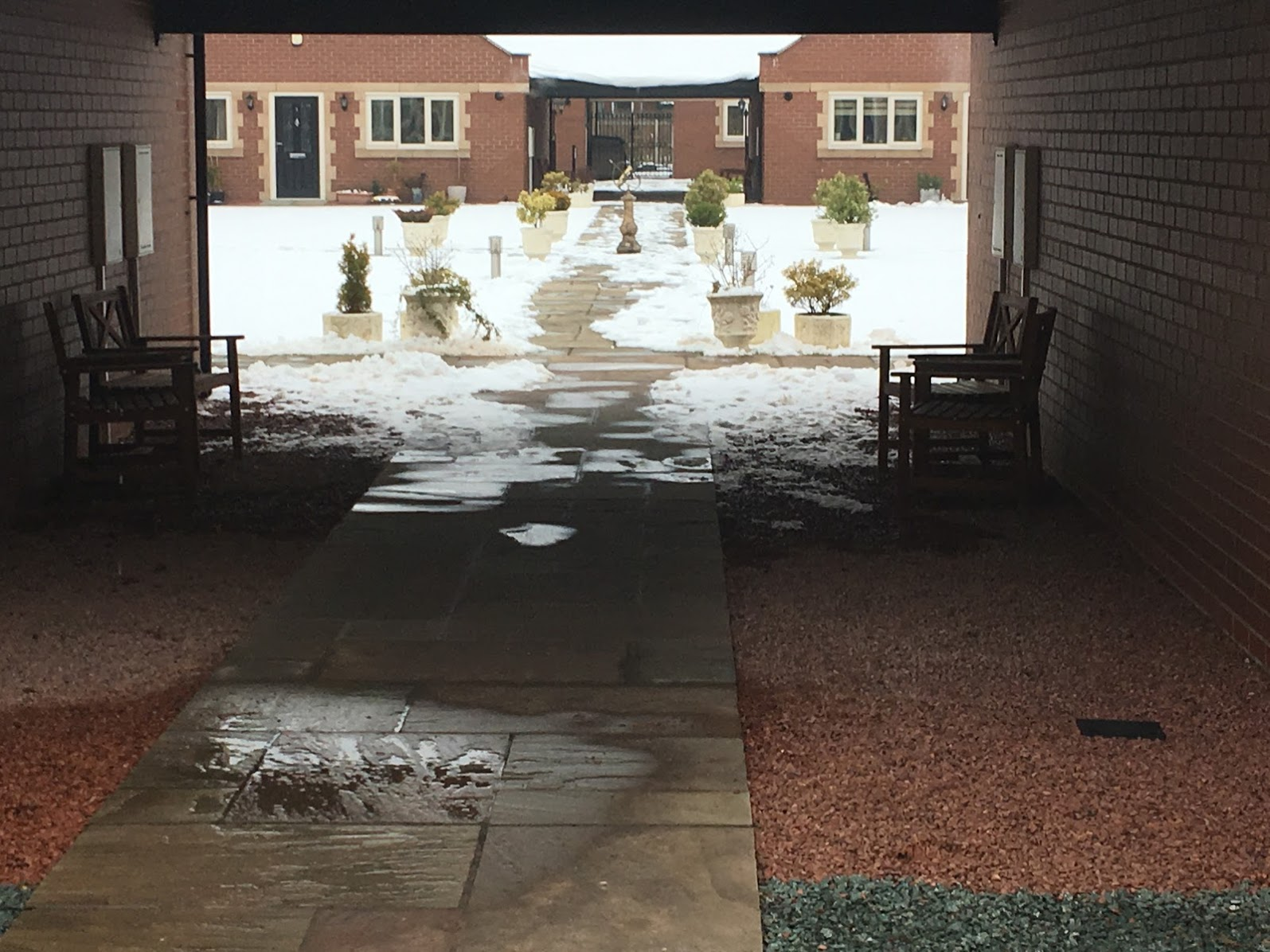
New flats completed on the site of the old King Edward VI Grammar School tennis courts in March 2018 at the back of the main school.

== King Edward VI Grammar School Trust ==
The proceeds of the sale of the school site were entrusted to a legal trust, the King Edward VI Grammar School Trust, which endows young people with grants towards their ongoing education.
link to King Edward VI Grammar School Trust

== Old Retfordians ==
Former pupils may join the "Old Retfordians Association".

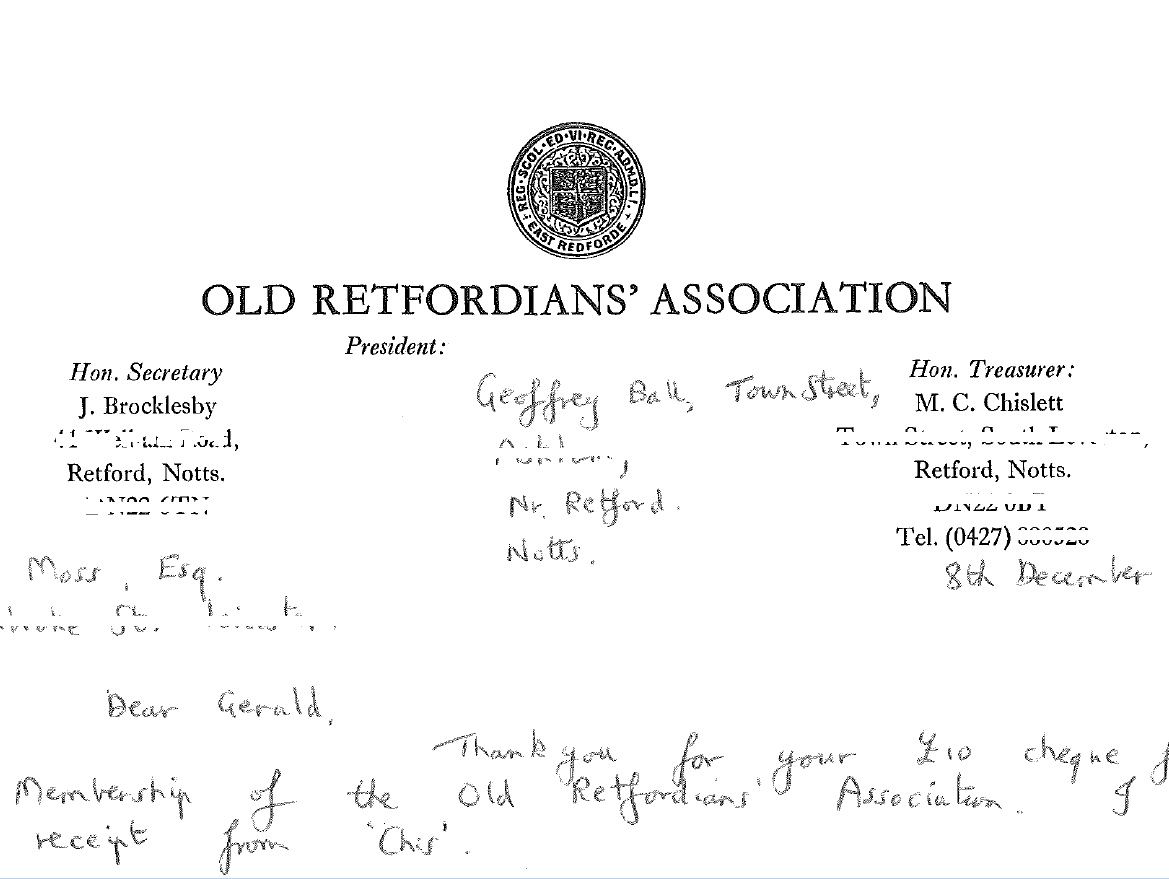
ORA letterhead.

ORA 1992 AGM details. The Old Retfordians met annually to renew old friendships.

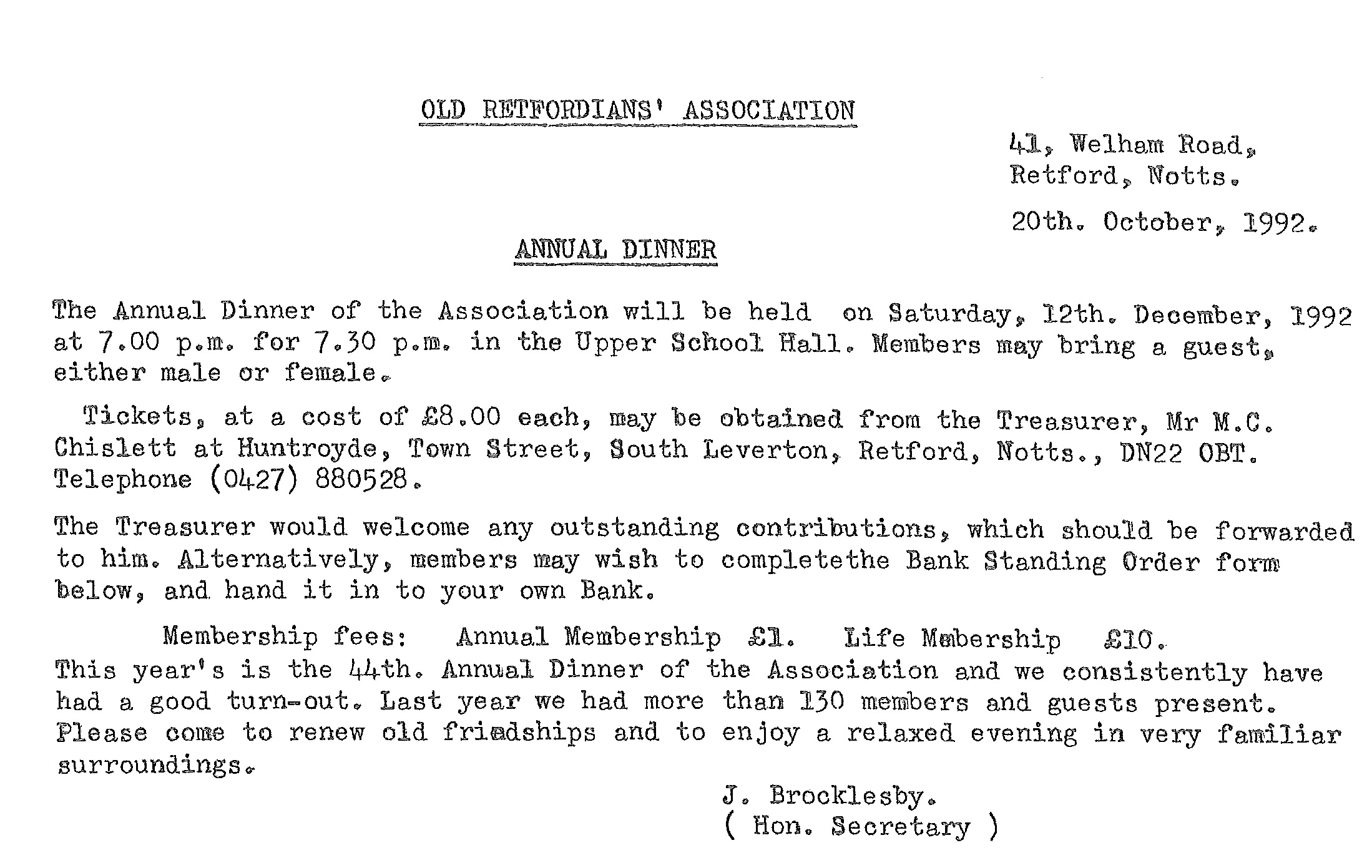
The ORA Annual Dinner invitation notes the 44th reunion, from 1948 to 1992.
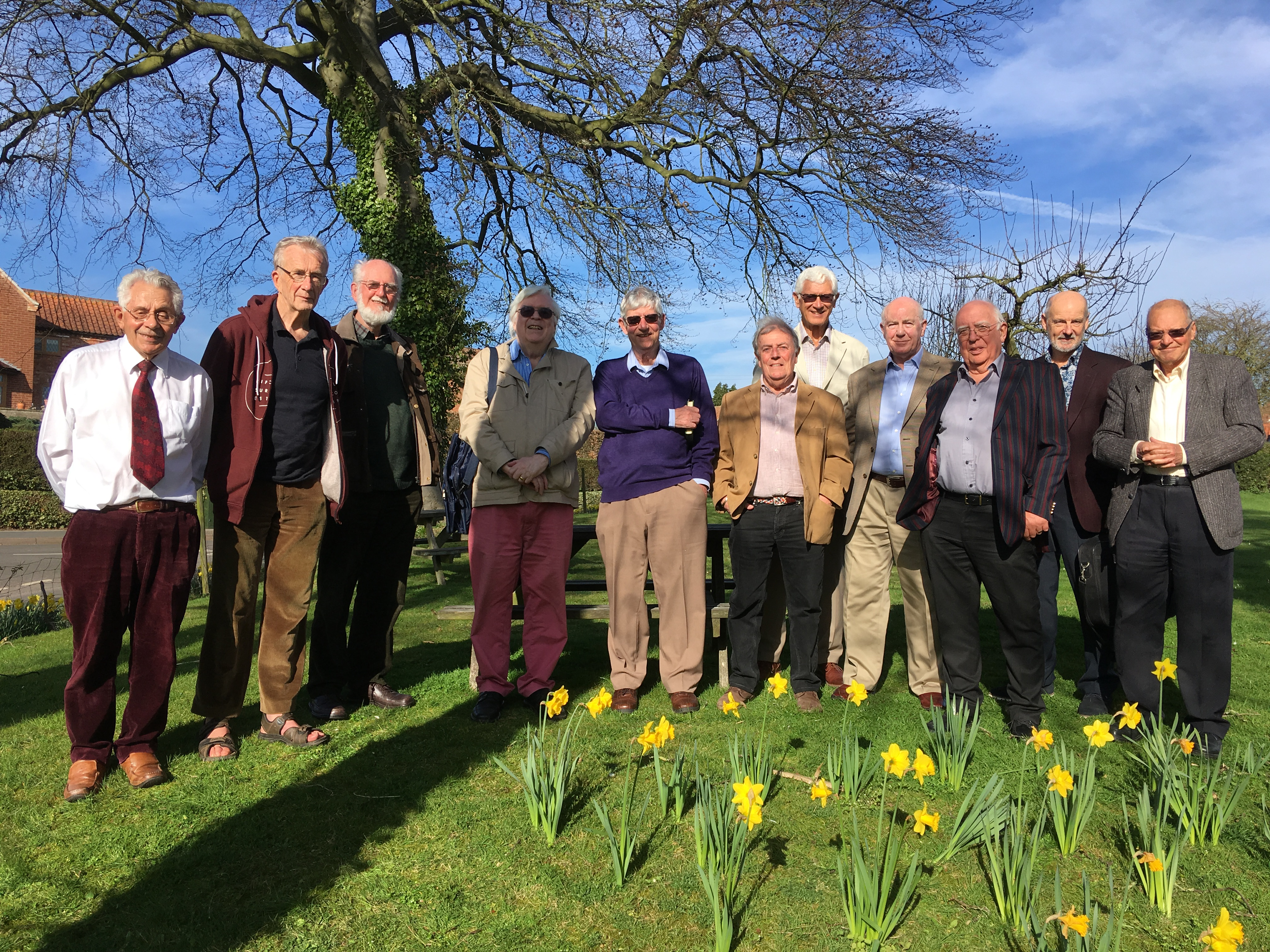
Pupils from the 1950s in 2019.

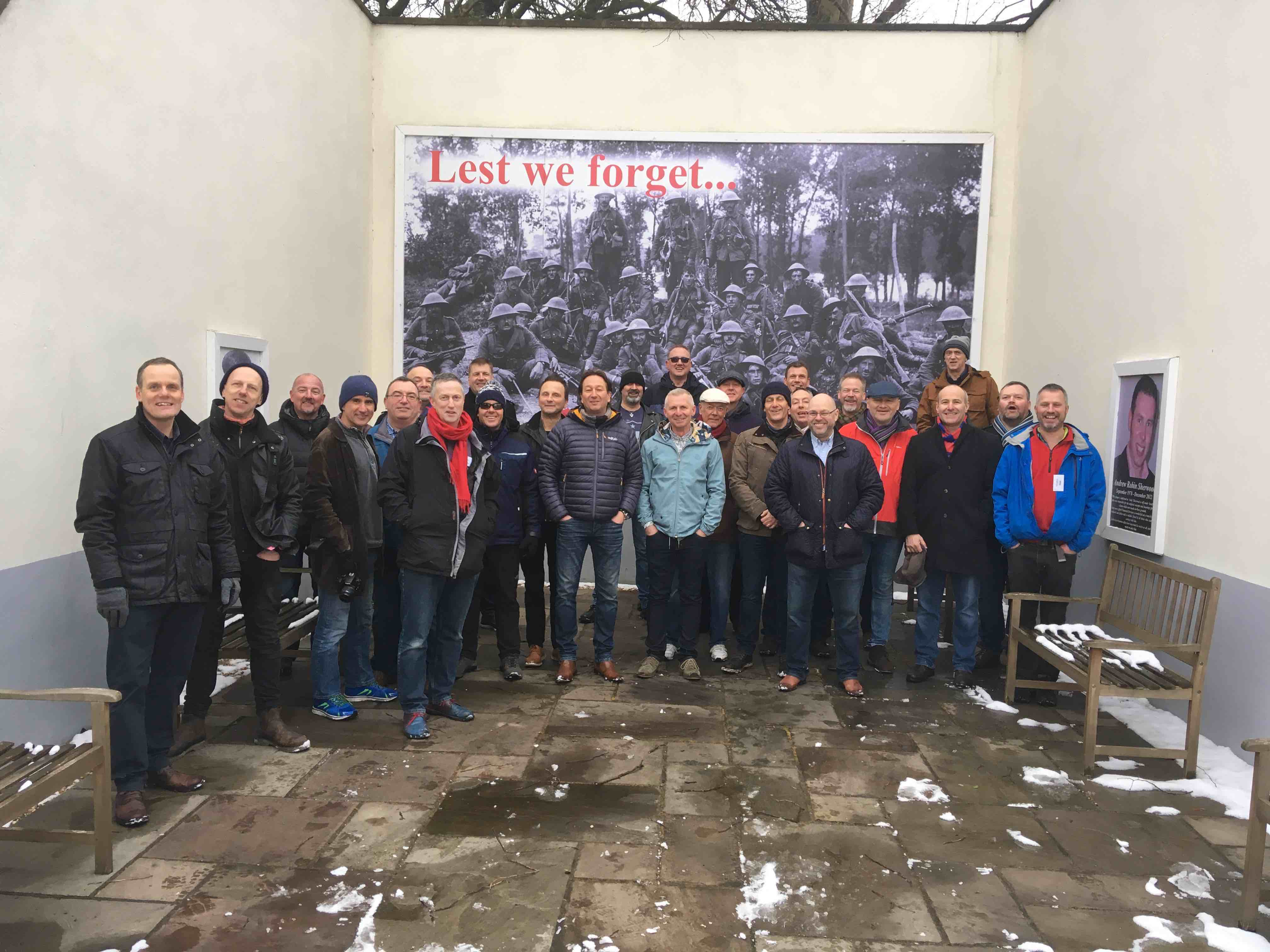
Pupils from the 1970s reunited in 2018, in the 1924 Fives Court commemorating William Eyre.
