= The Elizabethan Academy =

Location
- Hallcroft Road; Retford, Nottinghamshire, DN22 7PY; England; 53°20′01″N 0°57′02″W

Information
- Type: Academy
- Motto: Finis Coronat Opus
- Established: 1979 (Moved to Hallcroft Road Easter 2007)
- Local authority: Nottinghamshire
- Specialist: Science & math
- Department for Education URN: 138076 Tables
- Ofsted: Reports
- Chair of Trustees: Derek Cheetham
- Principal: Mr Tom Crowther
- Staff: 93
- Gender: Coeducational
- Age: 11 to 18
- Enrolment: 875
- Houses: Burghley House, Galileo House, Hardwick House, Shakespeare House
- Colour: Grey with green tartan
- Former names: Retford High School for Girls, The Elizabethan High School
- Former URN: 122885
- Website: elizabethan.notts.sch.uk

The Elizabethan Academy is a secondary school with academy status located in the Nottinghamshire market town of Retford, England. It is situated to the north of Retford town centre, to the east of the A638, on the side of the River Idle once known as West Retford. The academy has specialist status in Science and Mathematics.

Historically, the school played an important role in the secondary and tertiary education of girls in Nottinghamshire, enabling girls to attend university and achieve advanced degrees.

== Current school ==
The school became an academy in April 2012, and was renamed The Elizabethan Academy. The school is no longer directly funded or operated by Nottinghamshire County Council, but still coordinates with the council with regards to admissions.

As part of the Bassetlaw PFI project, the school buildings in Retford were replaced. In 2007 the school was relocated from its previous two sites to a purpose-built building in Hallcroft built on the playing fields of the former Lower Site. At this time the Sixth form was moved to a purpose-built Post 16 centre jointly run with other schools. In 2018 this was reversed and a new Sixth form was opened at the school on the Hallcroft site.

In the 2018-19 academic year the school had 875 pupils on the register aged 11–18, of which 49% were boys and 51% were girls. The school employed 55 teachers (50 FTE) with a pupil-teacher ratio of 17.5. In addition it had 13 teaching assistants and 25 support staff. The school has four houses - Burghley, Galileo, Hardwick and Shakespeare - each with its own head of house. The current headteacher is Mr Tom Crowther.

=== Facilities ===
Modern facilities were provided for the school as part of the PFI scheme which saw the rebuilding of secondary schools across Bassetlaw. PE facilities are largely provided as part of the new site, in contrast to former provisions at the previous sites. Modern ICT facilities include building-wide wireless coverage, mobile laptop trolleys, six permanent ICT teaching rooms and interactive white boards.

=== Ofsted ===
The school has received a rating of "good" from Ofsted in its latest inspection on 2 May 2018. This is consistent with its previous rating of "good" in 2014.

=== Academic performance ===
GCSE Results In 2018/19 the Elizabethan performed above the local authority average in EBACC, but slightly below the national average. The attainment 8 score was significantly below both the local and national averages, as were the percentage of pupils gaining a score of 5+ in both English and Maths. 94% of its pupils stay in education or enter employment after their GCSEs.

- Attainment 8 - 40.8
- Progress 8 - -0.39
- Percentage Grade 5+ in English and Maths - 34%
- EBACC - 39%

A Level Results Following the opening of a Sixth Form at the school (after the closure of the previous Post-16 Centre in 2018), 35 students chose to study A levels at the Elizabethan Academy. 6 pupils also studied technical qualifications.

The average score attained was 24.20 points, which is below both the Nottinghamshire average 32.19 and the national average 34.33.

The progress score was -0.53.

=== Attendance ===
Absences were 5.3% compared to a national average of 5.5%. The percentage of pupils missing 10% or more of the mornings or afternoons they could attend (classified as 'persistently absent') is lower than the national average at 12.1% compared to 13.7%.

=== Newsletter ===
The school produces a termly newsletter, The Elizabethan Highlights, which is distributed to current students and other interested parties.

== History ==
The Elizabethan Academy has its origins in the Retford County High School for Girls, which was a girls' grammar school, also known as the Retford High School.

In 1893, a meeting was convened at the White Hart Hotel, Retford 'to consider the advisability of taking steps to establish a public High School for Girls in the district'. The prime instigator in this project was the manager of the Westminster Bank, Mr William Oakden, who in 1891 had moved from Nottingham to Retford. He and other like-minded people wanted to provide their daughters with some form of higher education.

The school rented Ordsall House on London Road and the first headmistress was Miss Arblaster, who joined from the High School for Girls, Hitchin, Hertfordshire. By January 1910 eighty girls attended the school, rising to 89 by December 1910.

The school eventually found a site on the corner of Pelham Road and Queen Street, adjacent to the canal. The formal opening of the County High School for Girls, Retford, took place on the 23 July 1913. The ceremony was performed by Lady Galway and an address was given by Mr HAL Fisher, Vice-Chancellor of Sheffield University. At that time there were 160 pupils. The pupils were divided into three houses: Violet House, Green House and Brown House.

In 1924 Miss Arblaster retired and was replaced by IM Brooks. The names of the school houses were changed to Garrett-Anderson, Clough and Bronte.

In 1939 girls from The Allerton High School, Leeds were evacuated to Retford and educated at the Retford County High School. They only remained one term before returning home. In 1940, 180 girls from Great Yarmouth High School for Girls were evacuated to Retford and joined the school. They stayed until September 1944.

In 1948 the school added Bradshaw House, named after one of the school's founders and long-standing Chairman Miss Bradshaw.

The school educated around 400 girls in the 1950s to 1970s. Three Score Years and Ten was written by DG Williams telling the story of the first 70 years of the school.

In 1979 the secondary schools in Retford were reorganised and the 11+ abolished. Boys were to be admitted for the first time. The result was a comprehensive school called The Elizabethan High School under head teacher Mrs Coxon-Butler. At this time the former Hallcroft Girls' secondary modern school on Hallcroft Road became the new school's Lower Site and the Retford Girls' High School became the school's Upper Site. The former Pelham Road/Queen Street site was demolished when the school moved to new buildings in Hallcroft and was renamed The Elizabethan Academy. The Pelham Road site is now a housing estate.

Whilst split across two sites, years 7 and 8 were taught at the Lower Site and years 9 through 13 at the Upper Site. To facilitate this arrangement, staff travelled between the sites during the school day.

=== Historic Head Teachers ===
- Miss Arblaster 1893-1924
- Miss I M Brooks 1924-1928
- Miss Edith Mary Mellor 1928-34
- Miss Jex 1934-35 (temporary appointment)
- Miss Eleanor Joyce Southam 1935-53
- Miss MM Townsend 1953-
- Miss Henderson
- Mrs Coxon-Butler
- Mr Don Wilcox
- Mr Bob Hopley
- Mrs Lynn Kenworthy
- Mrs Christine Horrocks (2015–present)

== In the news ==
- Plans to move Retford Post 16 Centre
- Elizabethan Academy teacher wins Pearson teaching award
- Retford school wins arts award

== Notable former pupils ==
=== Retford High School for Girls ===
- Kathryn Riddle, High Sheriff of South Yorkshire from 1998–99, and chairman from 2006 of the Yorkshire and the Humber Strategic Health Authority
- In 1913 Frances Mary Edwards was awarded a certificate of the Royal Humane Society and a watch from the Carnegie Hero Fund for rescuing "a poor mother and child" from drowning. The presentation was made by Sir Frederick Milner
- Eileen Skellern, nurse
- Jane Brotherton Walker, insect biologist
