= Ordsall Hall School =

Location
- Ordsall Road; Retford, Nottinghamshire, DN22 7PL; England; 53°19′05″N 0°57′39″W

Information
- Established: 1958
- Closed: 2003
- Local authority: Nottinghamshire
- Department for Education URN: 122884 Tables
- Ofsted: Reports
- Headteacher: Mr A M Deakin
- Gender: Coeducational
- Age: 11 to 18

Ordsall Hall Comprehensive School was a comprehensive school situated on Ordsall Road in the market town of East Retford in the district of Bassetlaw, Nottinghamshire.

== History ==
In 2003 it merged with the King Edward VI Grammar School to become Retford Oaks High School a new complex built on a greenfield site. Following its closure, the school buildings and the Old Hall were demolished. The site was used for a new Post-16 Centre for Retford.

Previous Head masters include:

- Walter Oliver Howells
- Mike James
- Arthur Deakin

== Notable alumni ==
- Sarah-Jane Honeywell, TV presenter
