= Belmont Hospital, Tiverton =

Belmont Hospital
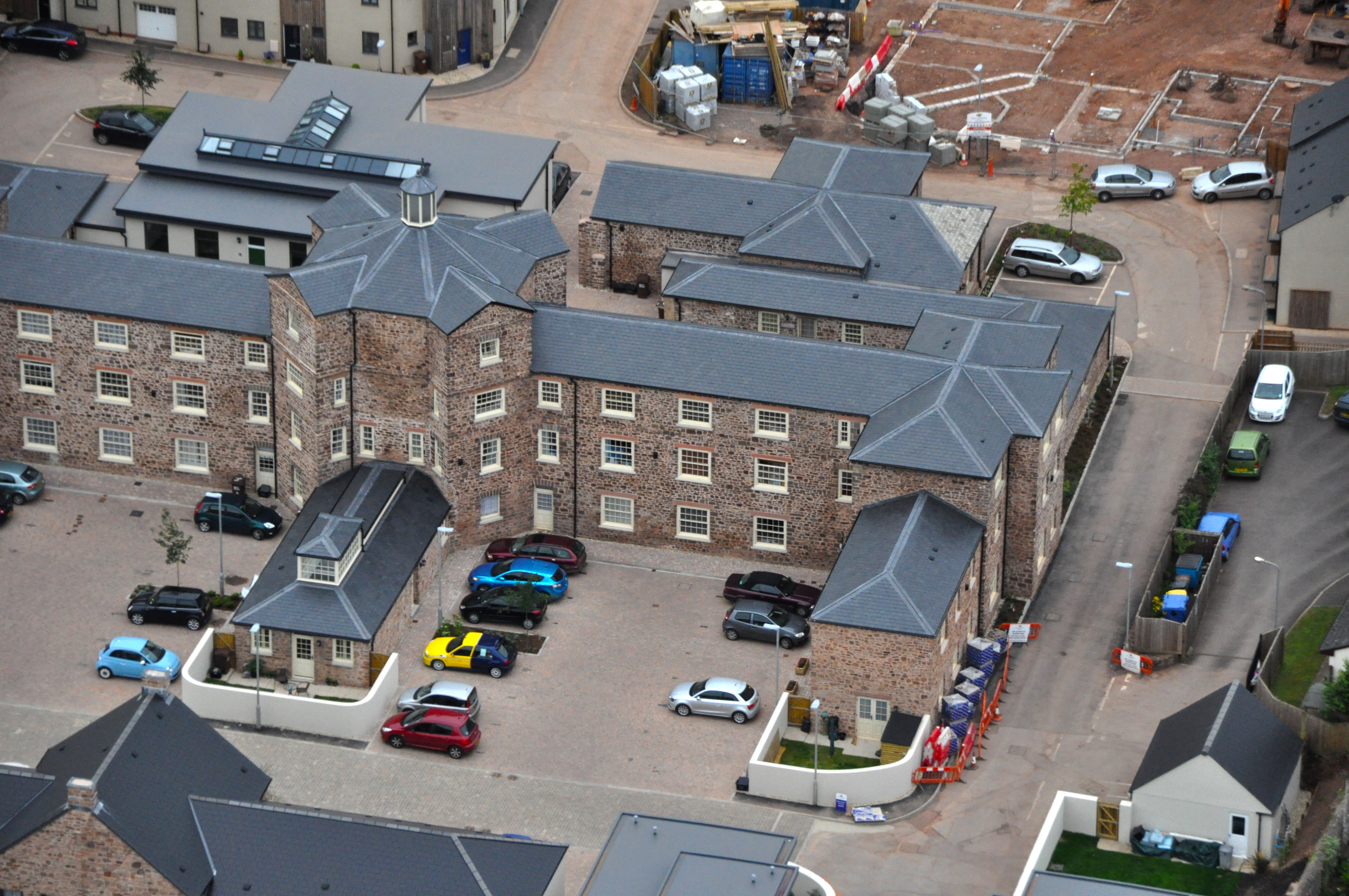
- Belmont Hospital

- Shown in Devon

Geography
- Location: Belmont Road, Tiverton, Devon, England
- Coordinates: 50.9072°N 3.4825°W

Organisation
- Care system: NHS
- Type: Community

History
- Founded: 1838
- Closed: 1990

Links
- Lists: Hospitals in England

Belmont Hospital was a health facility in Belmont Road, Tiverton, Devon, England. It has been converted into apartments and remains a Grade II listed building.

== History ==
The facility, which was designed by Sir George Gilbert Scott and William Bonython Moffatt, opened as the Tiverton Union Workhouse in 1838. It became the Tiverton Public Assistance Institution in 1930 and joined the National Health Service in 1948. After the hospital closed in 1990, the main building lay derelict for over 20 years before being converted into apartments by Devonshire Homes in 2013.
