= Malcolm Rae =

Malcolm Rae, OBE, FRCN is a British senior registered specialist in mental nursing/forensic psychiatry, mental health consultant, nursing educator and civil servant.

He began his career in public service as a NHS Mental Health Nursing Officer. He served as Director, Community Psychiatric Nurses Association, retiring after five years in 2002. As of 2011, he serves as Joint Lead Acute Care Programme, National Institute of Mental Health in England. He was made a Fellow of the Royal College of Nursing in 2001.

== Affiliations ==
- Royal College of Nursing, Former Chair, RCN Mental Health Society
- National Institute for Mental Health (NIMHE)
- University of Central Lancashire (Honorary Fellow)

National Association of Psychiatric Intensive Care and Low Secure Units (NAPICU)(Fellow)

== Religion ==
A resident of Preston, Lancashire, Rae frequently lectures on contemporary nursing concerns and about the ethical dilemmas in current mental health policies/practices. A Methodist, he has frequently spoken publicly about the role of faith and spirituality in sustaining recovery.

== Publications ==
- Therapeutic Interventions for Forensic Mental Health Nurses (Forensic Focus, 19)
- Key Debates in Psychiatric/Mental Health Nursing (ISBN 978-0-443-07391-5/ISBN 0-443-07391-0)
