= Eyre and Southall =

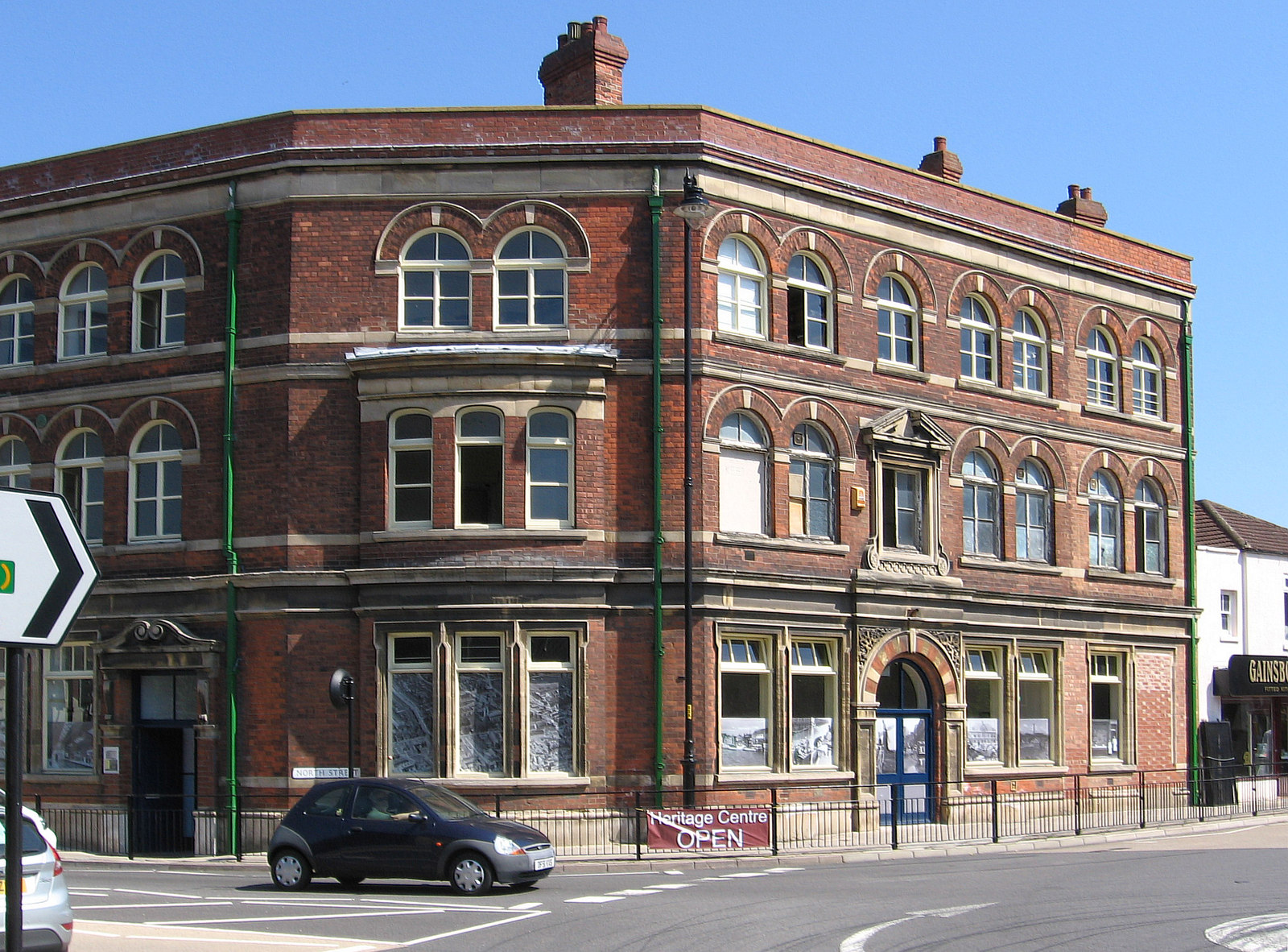
- Former Post Office Gainsborough

Practice information
- Key architects: Eyre and Southall
- Partners: William Eyre and William Southall
- Founded: 1894
- Location: Gainsborough and Retford

Eyre and Southall were an architectural practice with offices in Retford in Nottinghamshire and Gainsborough. William Southall (1868-1936) and William Eyre were working in the period from the late 1890s to the mid-1930s. Their offices were at 20 Chapelgate, Retford and at Trinity Street in Gainsborough. William Southall had previously worked as an architectural assistant in Marnchester and Dorchester before joining William Eyre. Southall qualified as LRIBA in 1910. William Eyre was also the Gainsborough Borough architect. Their work includes public buildings and housing in the Retford area and in the adjacent area of Lincolnshire. A collection of architectural plans by the practice are in the collection of the Bassetlaw Museum.

== Architectural Work by Eyre and Southall ==
=== Public and Commercial Buildings ===
- Beckingham Methodist Chapel, Beckingham cum Saunby. (1895)
- Gainsborough Post Office. (1904). The building is now the Gainsborough Heritage Centre.
- John Coupland Hospital, Ropery Road, Gainsborough. (1913). Neo-Georgian style. The main block is two storeys, with lower pavilions angled forward. The central bay has pilasters and a steep pediment, with an Arts-and-Crafts style porch with Venetian windows. The Arts-and-Crafts style continues in the interior.
- Former Henry Spencer Auction Rooms. The Square, Retford.
- Former Half Moon Public House (1928). The Square, Retford, adjacent to Retford Town Hall.
- Mason’s Arms, Spital Hill, Retford. (1925)
- 5 Market Place, Retford. (1930)

=== Housing ===
Many of Eyre and Southall’s buildings are in a Queen Anne revival style with prominent Dutch gables. They were responsible for around 35 houses in Lime Tree Avenue, Retford, dating from around 1900 to 1910. Other houses in Retford include

- 39-41 Cobwell Road (1895)
- 43 Queen Street. (1897)
- 4-6 Holy Road (1894)
- 14 Pennington Way (1895)
- 7-9 Holly Road (1896)
- 19 & 28 Victoria Road (1896-7).
- 47-49 Pennington Walk (1898)
- 2-6 Exchange Street. (1899)
- 47-49 North Road (1923)
- 20 Ordsal Road (1925)
- 13 North Road (1930)

== Literature ==
- Antram N (revised), Pevsner, N. & Harris J, (1989), The Buildings of England: Lincolnshire, Yale University Press.
- Antonia Brodie (ed), Directory of British Architects, 1834–1914: 2 Vols, British Architectural Library, Royal Institute of British Architects, 2001, Vol 2, pg. 667.
