= Alfred Pegler =

19th century merchant and industrialist

Alfred Pegler (c. 1820-1900) was a British merchant and industrialist who founded the Northern Rubber Company and through his sons Pegler Brothers and Co.

== Personal life ==
Alfred Pegler was born in about 1820 in Camden, London, the son of Moses and Susanna Octavia Pegler (b. 1789). In 1847 he married Elizabeth Selina Partridge (b. 1826-1904) in Lambeth, London and they had a daughter Josephine (b. 1850) and sons Stephen Francis (b. 1852-1937) and Francis Egerton (1856-1938). Alfred died in 1900 in Retford at the age of 80. His great grandson (the son of Francis Egerton Pegler and grandson of Frank Pegler) was Alan Pegler.

Pegler lived at Grade II* Amcott House, Grove Street, Retford (now the site of Bassetlaw Museum) until his death in 1900, after which his widow remained there until she died in 1904.

== Professional life ==
Pegler was the founder of a what later became an important manufacturing company in the North of England and was a pioneer of the rubber industry. Originally working as a merchant, he acquired the Victoria Works in Retford, Nottinghamshire in 1870, which had been producing a type of linoleum and in 1871 formed the Northern Rubber Company in Retford to make India Rubber Products. Initially the company made hose, protective aprons, rubber sheets, and hot water bottles. In 1881 it employed 21 men, 11 boys and 13 women. By 1914 it employed 400 who manufactured rubber fittings for railways, steamships and mines.

There are very few records remaining, but Nicholson (1974) states that he originally intended the Northern Rubber Co for his son Stephen, who became "a cripple as a child, resulting in his son Frank purchasing his interest". Nicholson states (p58) that Alfred resided in Sutton Manor and later Amcott House.

Through his sons, Stephen and Francis, Pegler set up a general engineers merchants in Glasgow, which later became Pegler Brothers and Co. manufacturers of plumbing fittings. It was renamed 'Peglers Limited' in 1932, eventually becoming Pegler Yorkshire.
