= Northern Rubber Company =

- Industry: Manufacturing
- Founded: 1871
- Products: Rubber

The Northern Rubber Company was a manufacturer of India rubber products founded in Retford, Nottinghamshire, England in 1871. Its assets were sold and acquired multiple times, but there is a direct link from The Northern Rubber Company to aerospace components manufacturer Icon Aerospace Technology, which was acquired by US firm IPS in 2020 and which still manufactures engineering components on the Thrumpton Lane site in Retford.

== History ==
=== Founding ===
The Northern Rubber Company was founded by merchant-turned industrialist Alfred Pegler in Retford, Nottinghamshire in 1871 when Pegler purchased the Victoria Works, Thrumpton Lane, Retford. The premises has previously been used to manufacture a type of linoleum.

Helped by his sons Stephen and Francis (Frank), Pegler was inspired by the Victorian industrial boom to begin manufacturing India Rubber Products such as hose, protective aprons, rubber sheets and hot water bottles. In 1881 it employed 21 men, 11 boys and 13 women. By 1914 it employed 400 people who manufactured rubber fittings for railways, steamships and mines.

According to Nicholson (p 58), Alfred Pegler intended that his son Stephen should run the business but he became "a cripple as a child, resulting in his son Frank purchasing his interest".

=== Growth and acquisition ===
After Alfred Pegler died in 1899, his son Frank took over running the business. Frank developed the business, recruiting a chemist (Herbert Rogers) and building a laboratory. The Northern Rubber Company under his direction became a pioneer in the development of synthetic 'rubber', particularly oil and solvent resistant rubber for industrial and mechanical uses, with Frank becoming the Chairman of the India Rubber Manufacturers Association in 1904.

In 1911, the company expanded to a new site, which housed the Textile Division, making waterproof fabric.

In 1914, the Northern Rubber Company became a limited company with Frank Pegler as the chairman, Francis Egerton Pegler (his son) and B Fenton directors. In 1924 Colonel HE Kitching, Frank Pegler's son-in-law also joined the board along with AW Cripps and George Green. Herbert Rogers took charge of the mechanical division and set about modernising it (including electrification of the plant).

Francis E Pegler took over running the firm in 1938 after his father died, becoming chairman and managing director. His son, Alan Francis Pegler, joined the firm and was promoted to joint managing director in 1955, becoming chairman after his father's death in 1957. Continuing with tradition, many of the directors were either relatives of the founders or the sons of long-serving members of staff.

According to Nicola Davison Reed, the proximity of the company to two railways (the East Coast Mainline and the Sheffield to Lincoln line) was part of the reason that the Northern Rubber Company prospered.

In 1965, the Northern Rubber Company was acquired by Peglers Ltd for £660,000 (around £13 million today), with Peglers Ltd changing its name to Peglers (Holdings) Ltd at that time. In 1965, 600 people worked there, with the workforce employing both men and women. The Northern Rubber Company then became a wholly owned subsidiary of Peglers (Holdings) Ltd, retaining its name.

In the 1990s the company began manufacturing steering column components for the Nissan Primera before the company was acquired by the Icon Polymer Group in 2001. From 27 December 2001 until 3 October 2005, the company was known as Icon Northern Rubber Ltd, before being rebranded as Icon Polymer Ltd in 2005. In 2016, it was rebranded once again to Icon Aerospace Technology Ltd, which specialises in the design and manufacture of products such as aircraft seals to the aerospace industry, supplying Airbus, Bombardier, Rolls-Royce and Triumph Aerostructures.

Although still based on Thrumpton Lane, Retford, much of the company's legacy site in Retford was subsequently sold by the company and has been redeveloped into housing and retail use.

In 2017, Icon struck a deal with Cobham Mission Systems to supply its Flexiflow in-flight refuelling hose to the firm, which is already used on the Airbus A330 MRTT and the Boeing KC-46. Icon is the only UK manufacturer of in-flight refuelling hoses.

In 2018, Icon and its landlords Strawson Holdings invested £7 million in building a state-of-the-art manufacturing facility. At that time the company had an order book worth £150 million. Later in 2018 it was announced that Icon Aerospace Technology Limited, along with Silentbloc Limited, which were both companies of Applied Composites Group were being subject to a management buy out and would be owned by a new company (Crosslink Technology Holdings). At the time Icon was said to employ 230 and Silentbloc 90, with the two companies having a combined turnover of £28 million.

In January 2020, it was announced that Integrated Polymer Solutions, a portfolio company of Arcline Investment Management, was acquiring Icon Aerospace Technology .

=== Products ===
Initially, the Northern Rubber Company made products such as hose, protective aprons, rubber sheets and hot water bottles from Indian rubber (natural rubber). According to Whitakers Red Book (1914), it later began selling products made from synthetic rubber along two main lines:

- industrial and mechanical products - rubber components for railways, steam ships, mines, aircraft and cars
- textiles - waterproof fabrics

The company had a patent for Leatherite, which was used for high pressure jointing and which was resistant to acids and alkalis. The company exhibited in the 1937 British Industries Fair, where it is described in the listing (p. 396) as "the sole makers of Leatherite for Steam Alkalis and Acids along with Nordoil, which is resistant to oils, benzol, petrol, trichlorethylene, cellulose and other solvents. Manufacturers of Mechanical Rubber Goods. Speciality: Potato Digger Sleeves. (Stand Nos. D.817 and D.716)"

In its current form as Icon Aerospace Technology Ltd it designs and manufactures custom, highly engineered polymer components, including engine seals, fabric-reinforced seals, hoses and rubber-to-metal bonding solutions for the aerospace and defence markets.
