= Alan Pegler =

British railway preservationist (1920–2012)

Alan Francis Pegler OBE, FRSA (16 April 1920 – 18 March 2012) was a British businessman, entrepreneur, and railway preservationist.

== Early life ==
Born in London on 16 April 1920, he was the great grandson of Alfred Pegler, founder of the Northern Rubber Company based in Retford, and son of Francis Egerton Pegler. His mother, Enid, was the daughter of amateur golfer Frederick Schomberg Ireland, the subject of Bernard Darwin's book, Green Memories. Raised in the Nottinghamshire village of Sutton cum Lound, he was educated at Hydneye House School, Sussex, and Radley College near Oxford. His uncle was Stephen Pegler.

== Career ==
Pegler gained his Private Pilot Licence aged 17 at Radley, and spent much of his time chasing LNER expresses along the East Coast Main Line. Pegler studied law at Jesus College, Cambridge until he was commissioned into the Fleet Air Arm at during World War II; he was trained to fly Blackburn Skua fighter/dive-bombers. However, a serious illness resulted in his being invalided out to join the Royal Observer Corps. Upset at not being assigned to active duty, he applied to become an intelligence officer for the Royal Air Force, where he accepted that, as his Fleet Air Arm commission was not recognised, he would have to start again in the ranks. By the end of World War II, he was again a commissioned officer in the RAF Photographic Recognition department.

Post-war, he was again accepted into Jesus College, Cambridge, but after a year his father became ill. Resultantly, he returned home to run the family business, Northern Rubber, having been made a director of the firm on his 21st birthday. He then became an underwriter at Lloyd's in the 1950s, and accumulated a fortune of his own.

== Railways ==
From 1951, Pegler began to run railway enthusiasts excursions, under the NRC banner. Through these efforts in 1955 he was directly appointed by Sir Brian Robertson to the British Transport Commission's Eastern area board. As a result, in 1959 he was on the footplate of the LNER Class A4 Sir Nigel Gresley as it broke the postwar steam speed record by hitting 112 miles per hour (180 km/h) south of Grantham.

=== Ffestiniog Railway ===
In 1951, Pegler was approached by friends to buy and clear the outstanding debt on the derelict Ffestiniog Railway, which having opened in 1832 ran from the slate quarries at Blaenau Ffestiniog 13 miles (21 km) to the seaport town of Porthmadog. Lent £3,000 by his father, he obtained control in June 1954, and was appointed the company's Chairman. Preserved trains first ran over a short section in 1954, but after a diversion to avoid the new Ffestiniog Power Station reservoir, the line was fully reopened to passengers in 1982.

A few years later it was carrying 200,000 passengers, the second largest Welsh tourist attraction after Caernarvon Castle. Many saw this as the result of Pegler's drive and ability to inspire others with his unquenchable enthusiasm for fulfilling his dream. Pegler, who remained fully involved with the railway until his death in 2012, was appointed OBE in the 2006 New Year Honours in recognition of his contribution.

=== 4472 "Flying Scotsman" ===
Pegler first saw LNER Class A3 4472 Flying Scotsman in Wembley at the 1924 British Empire Exhibition. In 1961, he received £70,000 for his share holding when Northern Rubber was sold to Pegler's Valves, a company started by his grandfather. In 1962, British Railways announced that they would scrap the Flying Scotsman. A group called "Save Our Scotsman" were unable to raise the £3,000 scrap value of the locomotive that would prevent this. Pegler stepped in and bought the locomotive outright, with the political support of Prime Minister Harold Wilson. He spent the next few years spending large amounts of money having the locomotive restored at the Doncaster Works, and then persuaded the British Railways Board to let him run enthusiasts' specials. The Flying Scotsman was at that time the only steam locomotive running on mainline British Railways.

In 1969, Prime Minister Wilson agreed to support Pegler via the Trade Department, running the locomotive in the United States and Canada to support British exports. To comply with American railway regulations, it was fitted with a cowcatcher, bell, buckeye couplers and an American-style chime whistle. Starting in Boston, Massachusetts, the tour ran into immediate problems, with some states seeing the locomotive as a fire hazard, and thereby raising costs through the need for diesel-headed-haulage through them. However, the train ran from Boston to New York, Washington and Dallas in the first year; from Texas to Wisconsin and finishing in Montreal in 1970; and from Toronto to San Francisco in 1971: a total of 15,400 miles (24,800 km). In 1970, Edward Heath's Conservative Party ousted Wilson's Labour government, and withdrew financial support from the tour, leading Pegler to fund the tour himself during that same year.

By the end of the Flying Scotsman tour in 1972, the money had run out and Pegler was declared bankrupt at a cost of £132,000 in debt, with the locomotive in storage in U.S. Army Sharpe Depot to keep it away from unpaid creditors. In 1973, in a rescue mission, the Flying Scotsman was sold to rail enthusiast Sir William McAlpine, who returned it to the UK.

== Later life ==
Pegler worked his passage home from San Francisco to England on a P&O cruise ship in 1971, giving lectures about trains and travel. Declared bankrupt in the High Court in 1972, he rented a room above a fish and chips shop opposite Paddington Station.

From 1973, Pegler was again employed by P&O for two seasons giving his popular lectures. He obtained a discharge from his bankruptcy in December 1974. Pegler then took up acting, gaining his Equity trade union card by playing Henry VIII in a theatre restaurant in St Katharine Docks. He also played 700 performances of Henry VIII at the Tower of London.

When Sir James Sherwood's Sea Containers company began collecting Pullman Company carriages to relaunch an Orient Express, Pegler introduced himself as a useful railway contact, as well as an expert lecturer. Sherwood employed Pegler as a lecturer six days a week, and when the trains were not running he performed the same role on British Rail's luxury Highland rail cruises.

== Personal life ==
Pegler married four times:

- Susan Bendell (1940 – unknown, divorced), with whom he had a son, Timothy
- Lois Reith (1946–1948, her death)
- Pamela Marshall (1952–1956, her death), with whom he had a daughter, Penny
- Pauline Graves (1957–1970, divorced)

Pegler's partner for much of his later life was Petrina Derrington. He died on 18 March 2012 at the age of 91, after a short illness.

On 13 October 2018, his ashes were taken on board the Flying Scotsman for a journey from London King's Cross to York. As he had wished, they were scattered in the firebox as the train ascended Stoke Bank. His daughter Penny Vaudoyer was on the footplate.

== Legacy ==
Alan Pegler was known throughout the world for his contributions to the preservation movement, being famously involved with two of its greatest achievements: the saving of the complete Ffestiniog Railway, and of probably the world's most famous steam locomotive, Flying Scotsman.

A mosaic plaque to Alan Pegler was installed in the booking office at Retford Station, and unveiled on Retford Heritage Day 2024 (14 September 2024). Those attending the unveiling included Penny Vaudoyer, Alan Pegler’s daughter.
