= Ethel Standiford-Mehling =

American artist and photographer (1871–1963)

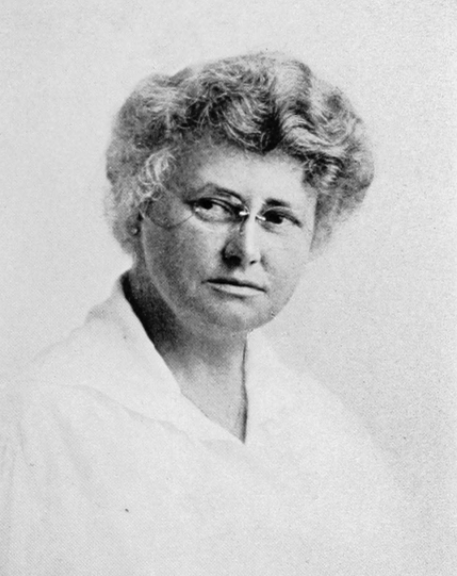
- Born: Ethel Conway; January 3, 1871; Jackson County, Indiana, U.S.
- Died: May 9, 1963 (aged 92); Mount Healthy, Ohio, U.S.
- Burial place: Cave Hill Cemetery; Louisville, Kentucky, U.S.
- Occupations: Artist; photographer
- Spouses: Frank Standiford (m. 1891; died 1916) Harold David Mehling (m. 1917)

Ethel Standiford-Mehling (née Conway; 1871–1963) was an American artist and photographer.

== Biography ==
Ethel Conway was born in Jackson County, Indiana on January 3, 1871.

She studied to be a teacher, but instead apprenticed to a photographer. By 1901 she owned and operated the Standiford Photographic Studio in Louisville, Kentucky. In the early part of the 20th century she experimented with early photographic techniques such as the autochrome Lumière and photo-viewing devices such as the diascope. An example of her early photography is the autochrome Lumière diascope of two of the children of Eleanor Silliman Belknap Humphrey.

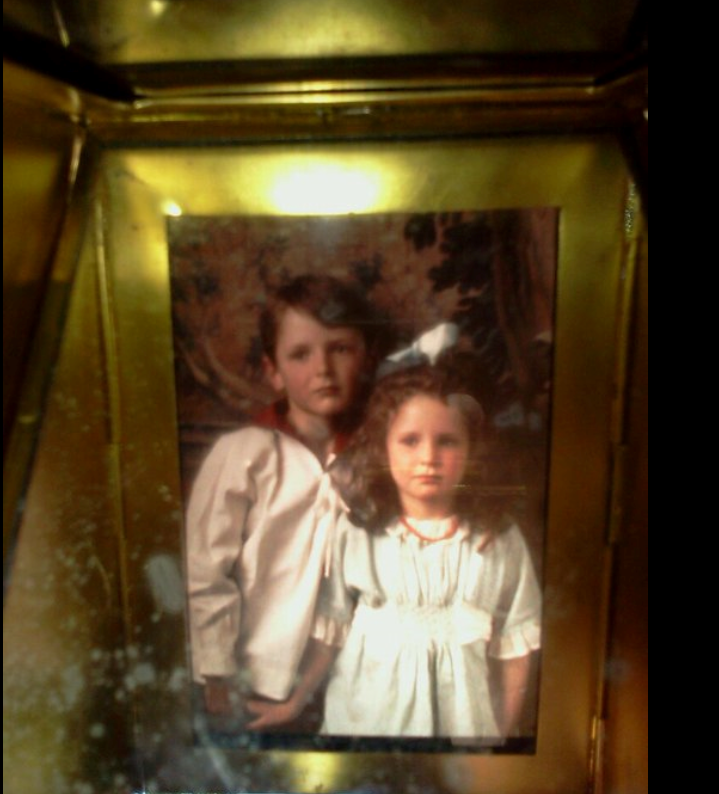
Autochrome Lumière diascope of two of the children of Eleanor Silliman Belknap Humphrey

Standiford-Mehling moved the Standiford Photographic Studio from Louisville to Cleveland, Ohio in 1919, locating first in the Gage Gallery of Fine Arts, then in the Chilcote Building (1925), and subsequently in the Hickox Building at 1030 Euclid Avenue, where she worked into the 1930s. She was awarded prizes for her photographs of Cleveland's elite of the 1920s and 1930s at the Cleveland Museum of Art exhibitions. A collection of her work, including photographic portraits of important citizens of Cleveland, is held by the Western Reserve Historical Society. One of her portraits and a statement about the portrait may be found in The American Annual of Photography.

Her photo of Louis Rorimer (1872–1939), the father of museum curator James Rorimer, appears in an article about him in The Plain Dealer.

Two photographs of Anna Burge Muir, attributed to Standiford studio and borrowed from a 1927 Louisville Herald-Post article, appear in a website about The Little Colonel, a series of stories for children by Annie Fellows Johnston. One photo is of Anna Burge Muir as a child and one is of her as the grownup wife of lawyer Edward Porter Humphrey. Anna Burge Muir Humphrey was the real-life model for the character Anna Moore (Rob Moore's cousin) in the stories.

A portrait of Lily Belknap, daughter of Colonel Morris Burke Belknap and Lily Buckner, is included in the Herald-Post collection of photos of prominent Louisvillians from Standiford Studio. Generally, Standiford-Mehling preferred men as subjects for her portraits and discussed her reasons in a 1932 interview published in the Middletown Times Herald.

Faced with financial failure, she filed for bankruptcy and closed the Standiford Studio in 1936. She presented a portfolio of 500 autographed photographs of prominent Cleveland residents to the Cleveland Public Library. Clevelanders are represented in the collection through newspaper photographs and portraits by George Mountain Edmondson and Ethel Standiford.

Standiford-Mehling was the first woman elected president of the Cleveland Photographers Association.

== Personal life ==
She married Frank Standiford in 1891. After his death in 1916, she remarried to Harold David Mehling in 1917.

She was an amateur golfer, winning a tournament in Louisville in May 1917.

She died at her home in Mount Healthy, Ohio on May 9, 1963, and was buried at Cave Hill Cemetery.
