= Autochrome Lumière =

Early colour photography process

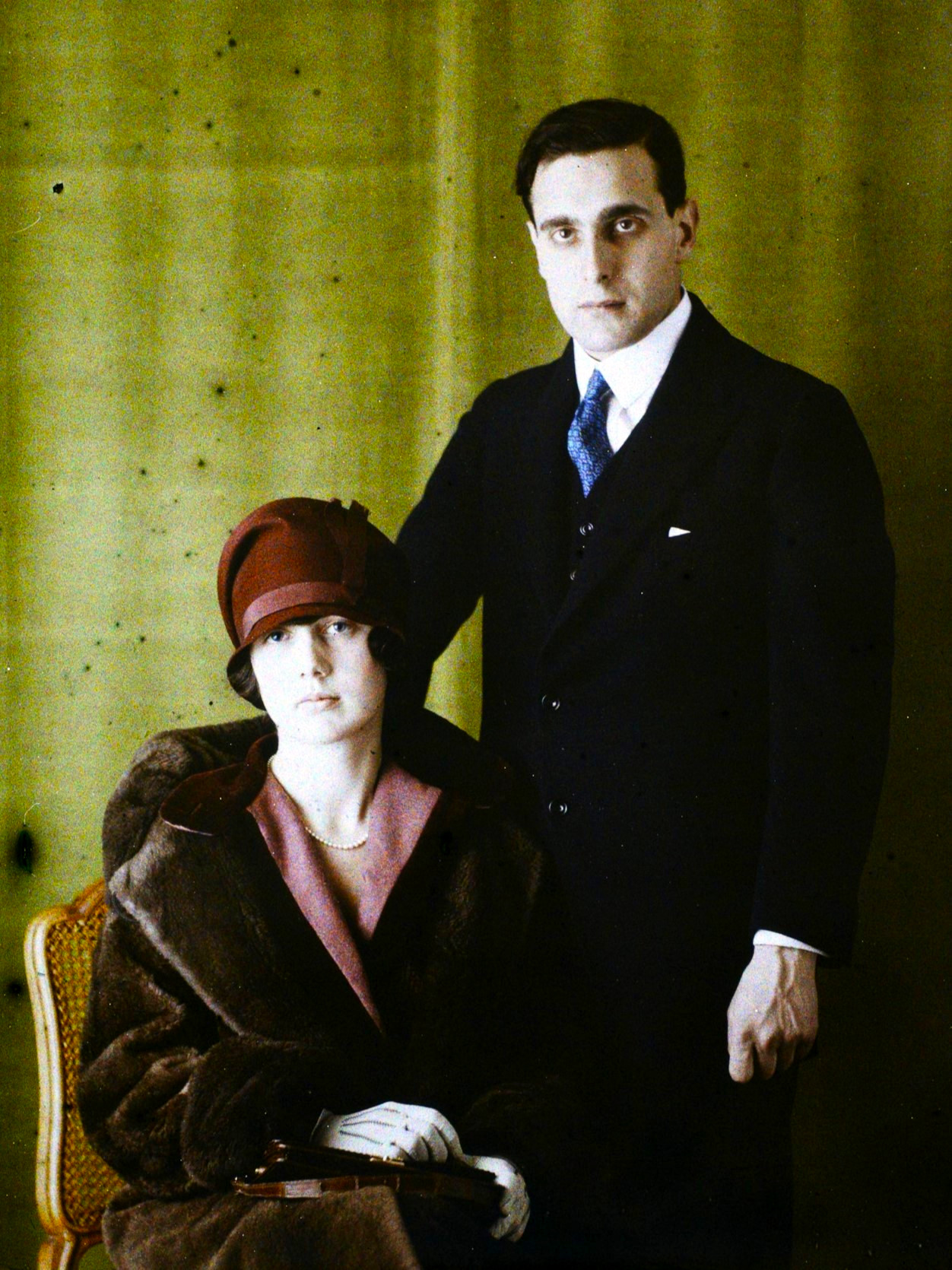
Autochrome of Sir Siegmund Warburg with his wife Eva Maria Warburg in Paris, by Georges Chevalier, 1926.

The Autochrome Lumière was an early colour photography process patented in 1903 by the Lumière brothers in France and first marketed in 1907. Autochrome was an additive color "mosaic screen plate" process. It was one of the principal colour photography processes in use before the advent of subtractive color film in the mid-1930s.

Prior to the Lumière brothers, colour photography was based on the three‑colour principle first suggested by Scottish physicist James Clerk Maxwell in 1855.

Louis Ducos du Hauron utilized the separation technique to create colour images on paper with screen plates, producing natural colours through superimposition, which would become the foundation of all commercial colour photography. Descendants of photographer Antoine Lumière, inventors Louis and Auguste Lumière utilized Du Hauron's (1869) technique, which had already been improved upon by other inventors such as John Joly (1894) and James William McDonough (1896), making it possible to print photographic images in colour. One of the most broadly used forms of colour photography in the early twentieth century, autochrome was recognized for its aesthetic appeal.

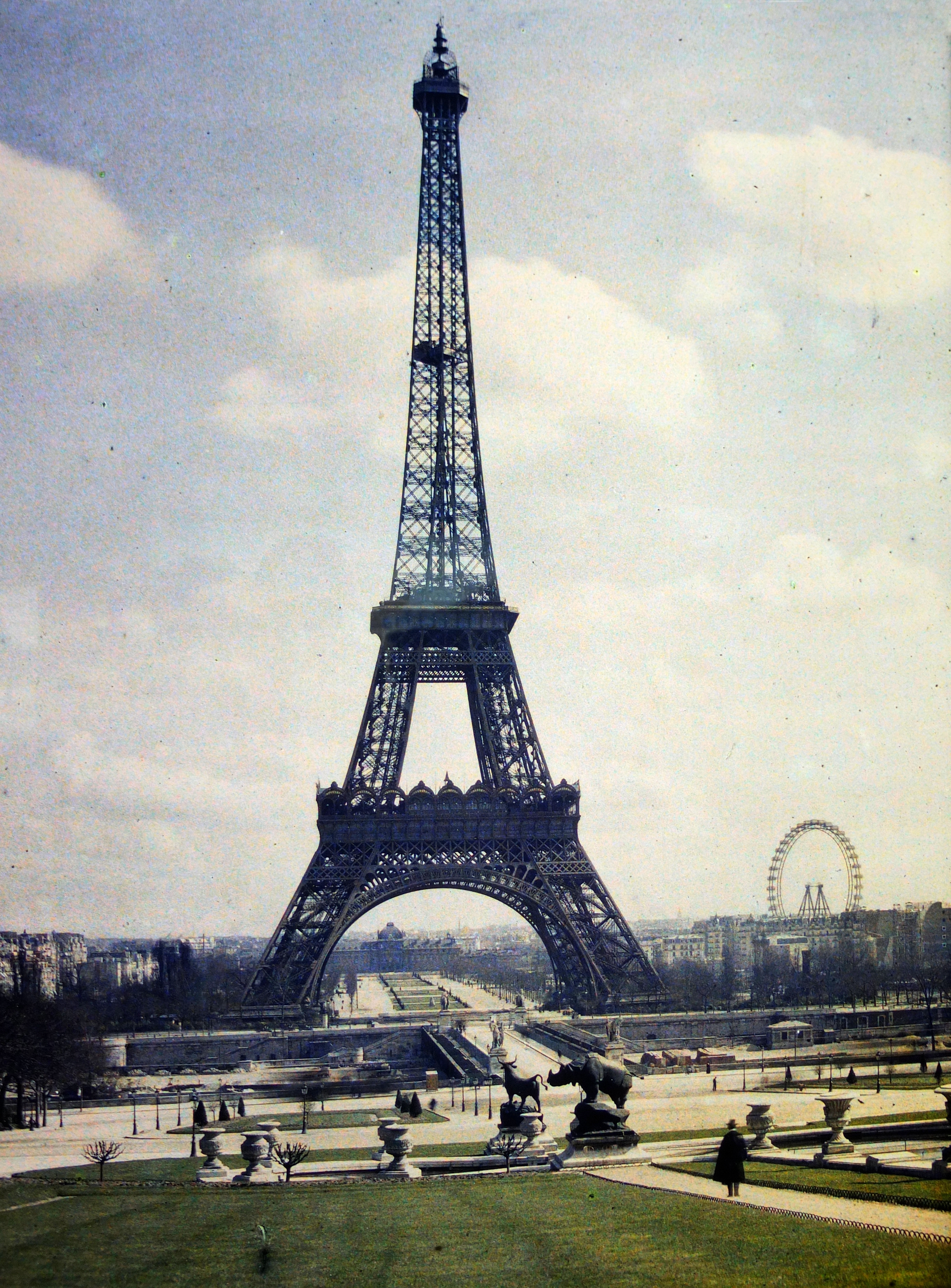
Eiffel Tower in Paris photographed in 1914 using the Autochrome process.

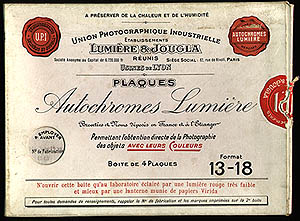
A box of Autochrome plates, expiration date 1923

== Structure and use ==
Autochrome is an additive color "mosaic screen plate" process. The medium consists of a glass plate coated on one side with a random mosaic of microscopic grains of potato starch dyed red-orange, green, and blue-violet (a variant of the standard red, green, and blue additive colors); the grains of starch act as color filters. Lampblack fills the spaces between grains, and a black-and-white panchromatic silver halide emulsion is coated on top of the filter layer.

Unlike ordinary black-and-white plates, the Autochrome was loaded into the camera with the bare glass side facing the lens so that the light passed through the mosaic filter layer before reaching the emulsion. The use of an additional special orange-yellow filter in the camera was required to block ultraviolet light and restrain the effects of violet and blue light, parts of the spectrum to which the emulsion was overly sensitive. Because of the light loss due to all the filtering, Autochrome plates required much longer exposures than black-and-white plates and films, which meant that a tripod or other stand had to be used and that it was not practical to photograph moving subjects. The plate was reversal-processed into a positive transparency –that is, the plate was first developed into a negative image but not "fixed", then the silver forming the negative image was chemically removed, then the remaining silver halide was exposed to light and developed, producing a positive image.

The luminance filter (silver halide layer) and the mosaic chrominance filter (the colored potato starch grain layer) remained precisely aligned and were distributed together, so that light was filtered in situ. Each starch grain remained in alignment with the corresponding microscopic area of silver halide emulsion coated over it. When the finished image was viewed by transmitted light, each bit of the silver image acted as a micro-filter, allowing more or less light to pass through the corresponding colored starch grain, recreating the original proportions of the three colors. At normal viewing distances, the light coming through the individual grains blended together in the eye, reconstructing the color of the light photographed through the filter grains.

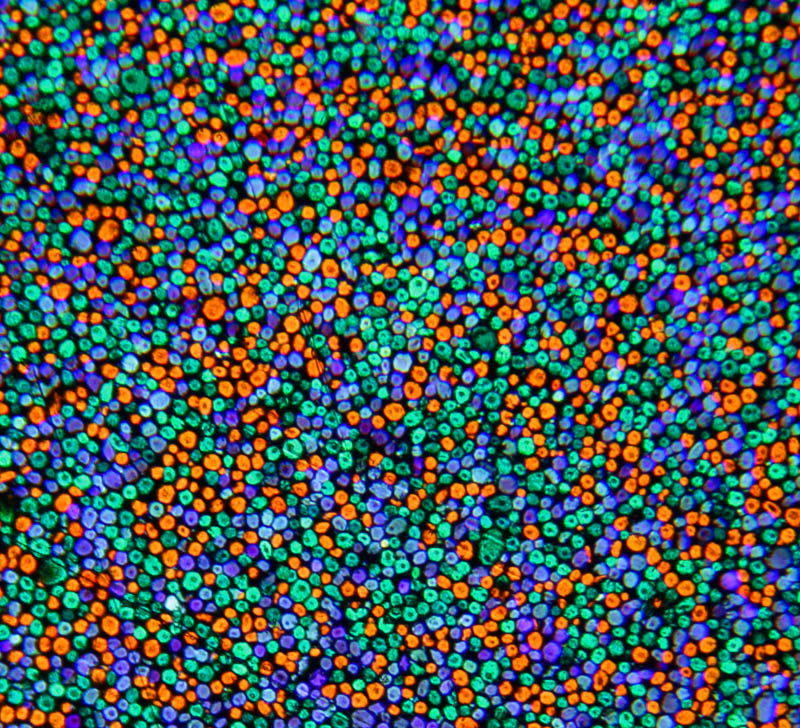
The colored starch grains in an Autochrome plate, greatly enlarged.

== Manufacturing techniques ==
To create the Autochrome color filter mosaic, a thin glass plate was first coated with a transparent adhesive layer. The dyed starch grains were graded to between 5 and 10 micrometers in size and the three colors were thoroughly intermingled in proportions which made the mixture appear gray to the unaided eye. They were then spread onto the adhesive, creating a layer with approximately 4,000,000 grains per square inch but only one grain thick. The exact means by which significant gaps and overlapping grains were avoided still remains unclear. It was found that the application of extreme pressure would produce a mosaic that more efficiently transmitted light to the emulsion, because the grains would be flattened slightly, making them more transparent, and pressed into more intimate contact with each other, reducing wasted space between them. As it was impractical to apply such pressure to the entire plate all at once, a steamroller approach was used which flattened only one very small area at a time. Lampblack was used to block up the slight spaces that remained. The plate was then coated with shellac to protect the moisture-vulnerable grains and dyes from the water-based gelatin emulsion, which was coated onto the plate after the shellac had dried. The resulting finished plate was cut up into smaller plates of the desired size, which were packaged in boxes of four. Each plate was accompanied by a thin piece of cardboard colored black on the side facing the emulsion. This was to be retained when loading and exposing the plate and served both to protect the delicate emulsion and to inhibit halation.

The 1906 U.S. patent describes the process more generally: the grains can be orange, violet, and green, or red, yellow, and blue (or "any number of colors"), optionally with black powder filling the gaps. Experimentations within the early twentieth century provided solutions to many issues, including the addition of screen plates, a yellow filter designed to balance the blue, and adjustments to the size of the silver halide crystals to allow for a broader spectrum of colour and control over the frequency of light.

== Viewing techniques ==
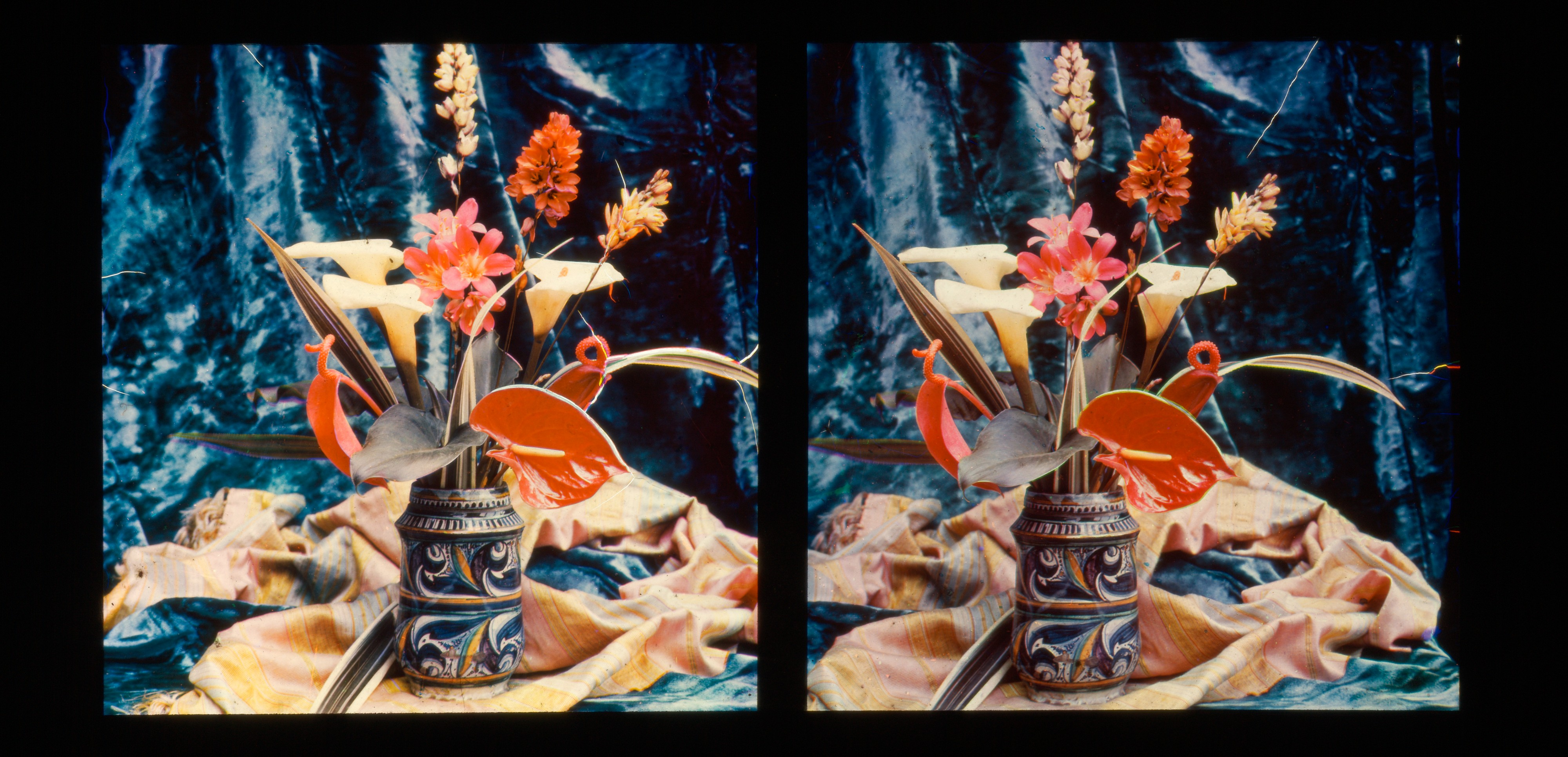
Still Life of Flowers in a Stein, stereoscopic 3 color slide produced before the autochrome by the Lumières

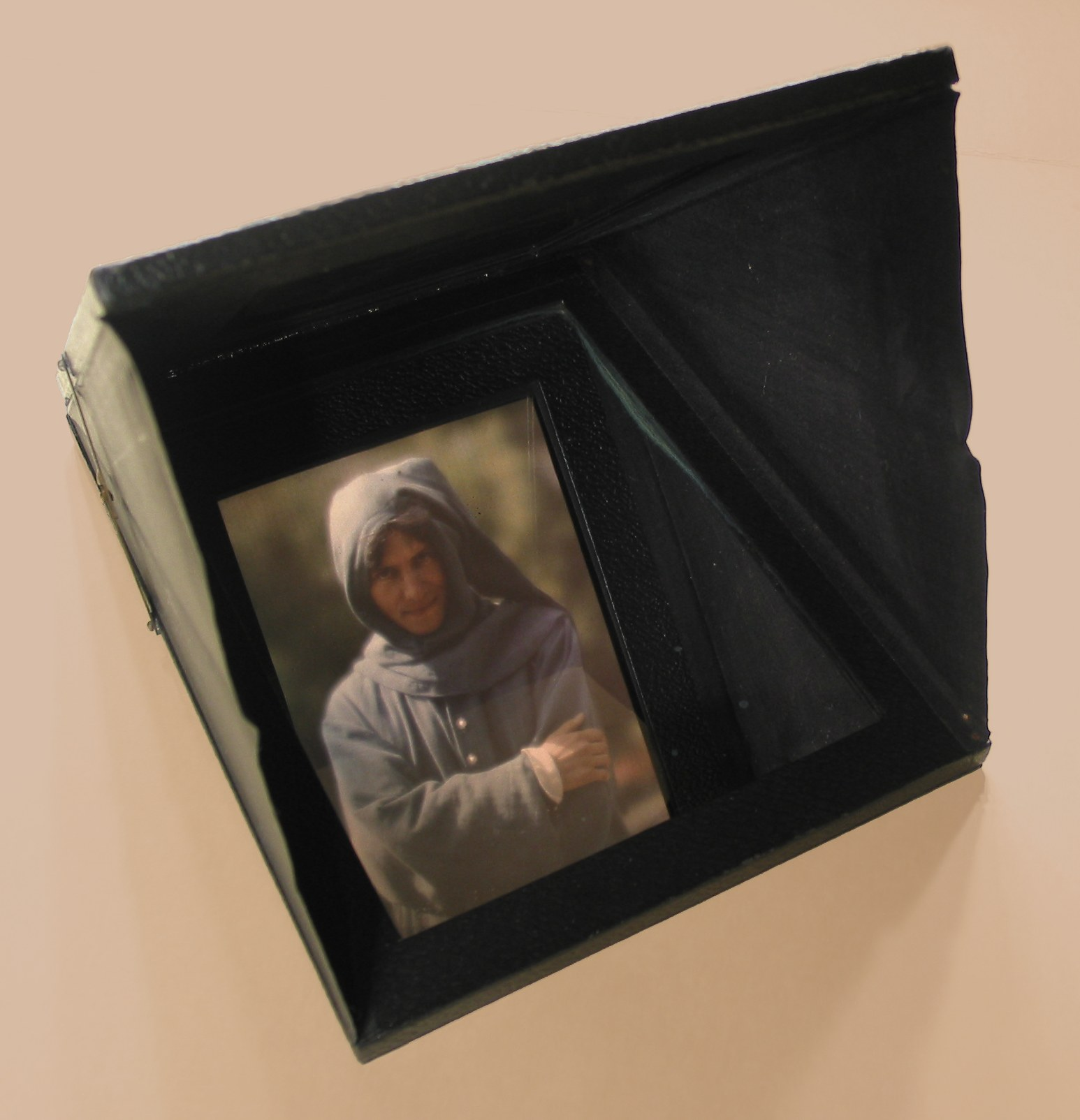
Autochrome in an original diascope viewing case. Percy MacKaye photographed by Arnold Genthe

Because the presence of the mosaic color screen made the finished Autochrome image very dark overall, bright light and special viewing arrangements were needed for satisfactory results.

Stereoscopic Autochromes were especially popular, the combined color and depth proving to be a bewitching experience to early 20th-century eyes. Usually of a small size, they were most commonly viewed in a small hand-held box-type stereoscope. Larger, non-stereoscopic plates were most commonly displayed in a diascope, which was a folding case with the Autochrome image and a ground glass diffuser fitted into an opening on one side, and a mirror framed into the other side. The user would place the diascope near a window or other light source so that light passed through the diffuser and the Autochrome, and the resulting back-lit, dark-surrounded image would be viewed in the mirror. Slide projectors, then known as magic lanterns and stereopticons, were a less common but especially effective display technique, more suitable for public exhibitions. Projection required an extremely bright and therefore hot light source (a carbon arc or a 500-watt bulb were typical) and could visibly "fry" the plate if continued for more than two or three minutes, causing serious damage to the color. Many surviving Autochromes suffer from such "tanning" and conventional projection is not a recommended means of displaying these irreplaceable images today.

However, a projector-like optical system (i.e., using condenser lenses for illumination, with a viewing lens in place of the projection lens), employing daylight (not direct sunlight) for the light source, can produce comparably excellent visual results—although for only one viewer at a time—without the hazards of actual projection.

The use of a "light box" or similar highly diffused artificial light source for viewing Autochromes, can damage the plates as the heavy scattering of light within and among the several layers of coatings on the plate degrades the color saturation. The slight pinkish tinge caused by colloidal scattering (the effect seen through a glass of water into which a couple of drops of milk have been mixed) is exacerbated, and the use of artificial light—especially fluorescent light—upsets the color rendition of a system which the Lumière Brothers carefully balanced for use with natural daylight.

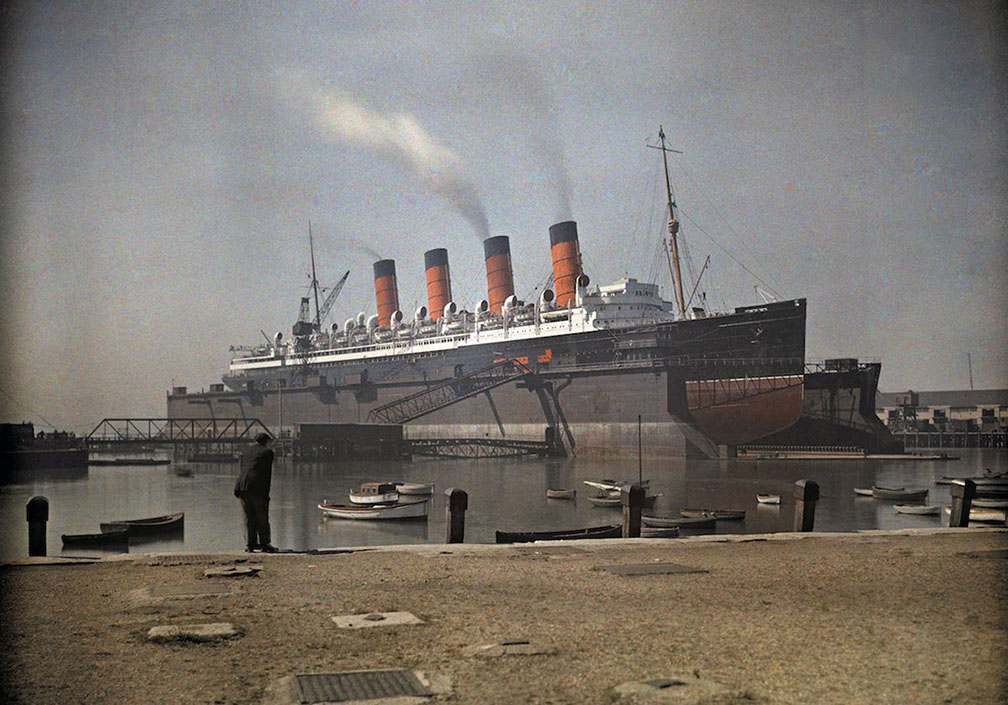
RMS Mauretania photographed in 1928 using the Autochrome process.

Making modern film or digital copies of Autochromes introduces other problems, because a color system based on red, green, and blue is used to copy an image that exists within the red-orange, green, and blue-violet system, providing further opportunities for color degradation. Vintage reproductions of Autochromes in old books and magazines have often been noticeably hand-adjusted by the photoengravers in an effort to compensate for some of the difficulties of reproduction, and as a result, they sometimes look more like hand-colored photographs than "natural color" ones. In short, it is very difficult to form an accurate impression of the appearance of any Autochrome image without seeing the original "in person" and correctly illuminated.

The lamination of the grains, varnish, and emulsion makes autochrome plates susceptible to deterioration, with each layer being vulnerable to changes in environment such as moisture, oxidation, cracking, or flaking as well as physical damage from handling; solutions involve conservative lighting conditions, chemical-free materials, and medium-range humidity control of between 63 and 68 degrees Fahrenheit in a well-integrated preservation plan.

== Artistic considerations ==
If an Autochrome was well made and has been well preserved, color values can be very good. The dyed starch grains are somewhat coarse, giving a hazy, pointillist effect, with faint stray colors often visible, especially in open light areas such as skies. The smaller the image, the more noticeable these effects are. Autochrome has been touted as "the colour of dreams." The resulting "dream-like" impressionist quality may have been one reason behind the enduring popularity of the medium even after more starkly realistic color processes had become available.

Although difficult to manufacture and fairly expensive, Autochromes were relatively easy to use and were immensely popular among enthusiastic amateur photographers, at least among those who could bear the cost and were willing to sacrifice the convenience of black-and-white hand-held snapshots. Autochromes failed to sustain the initial interest of more serious "artistic" practitioners, largely due to their inflexibility. Not only did the need for diascopes and projectors make them extremely difficult to publicly exhibit, they allowed little in the way of the manipulation much loved by aficionados of the then-popular Pictorialist approach.

== Advent of film-based versions ==
Autochromes continued to be produced as glass plates into the 1930s, when film-based versions were introduced, first Lumière Filmcolor sheet film in 1931, then Lumicolor roll film in 1933. Although these soon completely replaced glass plate Autochromes, their triumph was short-lived, as Kodak and Agfa soon began to produce multi-layer subtractive color films (Kodachrome and Agfacolor Neu respectively). Nevertheless, the Lumière products had a devoted following, above all in France, and their use persisted long after modern color films had become available. The final version, Alticolor, was introduced in 1952 and discontinued in 1955, marking the end of the nearly fifty-year-long public life of the Autochrome.

== Important autochrome collections ==
Between 1909 and 1931, a collection of 72,000 autochrome photographs, documenting life at the time in 50 countries around the world, was created by French banker Albert Kahn. The collection, one of the largest of its kind, is housed in The Albert Kahn Museum (Musée Albert-Kahn) on the outskirts of Paris. A new compilation of images from the Albert Kahn collection was published in 2008. The National Geographic Society made extensive use of autochromes and other mosaic color screen plates for over twenty years. 15,000 original Autochrome plates are still preserved in the Society's archives. The collection contains unique photographs, including numerous autochromes from Paris by Auguste Léon from 1925 and by W. Robert Moore from 1936 just before WWII.

In the U.S. Library of Congress's huge collection of American Pictorialist photographer Arnold Genthe's work, 384 of his autochrome plates were among the holdings as of 1955.

The George Eastman Museum in Rochester, N.Y. has an extensive collection of early colour photography, including Louise Ducos Du Hauron's earliest autochrome images and materials used by the Lumière brothers.

Bassetlaw Museum in Retford, Nottinghamshire holds a collection of over 700 autochromes by Stephen Pegler. This includes a collection of over 100 plates purchased by the museum in 2017 thanks to the generosity of local individuals and organisations. The images cover a range of subjects from still lifes, posed studies, local people and landscapes, and his travels abroad, and were taken between 1910 and the early 1930s. The Pegler collection of autochromes is thought to be the largest collection of autochromes by one photographer in Britain today.

The Royal Horticultural Society, UK has among the earliest colour photographs of plants and gardens taken by amateur photographer William Van Sommer (1859–1941), including of RHS Garden Wisley taken around 1913.

== Commercial use ==
One of the first books published with color photography used this technique. The 12 volumes of "Luther Burbank: His Methods and Discoveries, Their Practical Application" included 1,260 color photographs and a chapter on how this process worked.

In the early 1900s Ethel Standiford-Mehling was an experimental photographer and artist and owner of the Standiford Studio in Louisville, Kentucky. She was commissioned by Louisville artist and art patron Eleanor Belknap Humphrey to create an autochrome diascope of her two oldest children. Both the autochrome photograph of the Humphrey children and the diascope mirror viewing device, which closes into itself in a leather-bound case similar in size and appearance to a book, are well preserved and still viewable in 2015. Ethel Standiford-Mehling later moved her Louisville enterprise Standiford Studios to Cleveland, Ohio, and it is not known if any other examples of her autochrome diascopes still exist.

Vladimír Jindřich Bufka was a pioneer and popularizer of Autochrome in Bohemia.

== Neo-Autochromists ==
There has been a revival of interest in the process by some, including a few groups in France working with original Lumière machinery and notes. One such recreation is a series of images from 2008 by the French photographer Frédéric Mocellin. The British multimedia artist Stuart Humphryes has helped popularise the medium via his autochrome enhancement work in magazines, newspapers, and online platforms, with over 200,000 followers on his autochrome enhancement Twitter feed.

== In popular culture ==
- The 2006 film The Illusionist tried to recreate the look of Autochrome, although apparently basing that "look" on published reproductions rather than on actual Autochrome plates.
- The sepia-toned cinematography on James Gray's 2013 film The Immigrant was inspired by old autochrome photographs.
- Modern image sensors in digital cameras most commonly use a Bayer filter, which works in essentially the same way as the colored starch grains in an Autochrome plate –by breaking up the image into microscopically small color-filtered elements. In physical arrangement, however, the Bayer filter mosaic much more closely resembles the regular geometric pattern used in other color screen plates of the Autochrome era, such as the Paget and Finlay plates.

== Gallery ==
Autochrome images

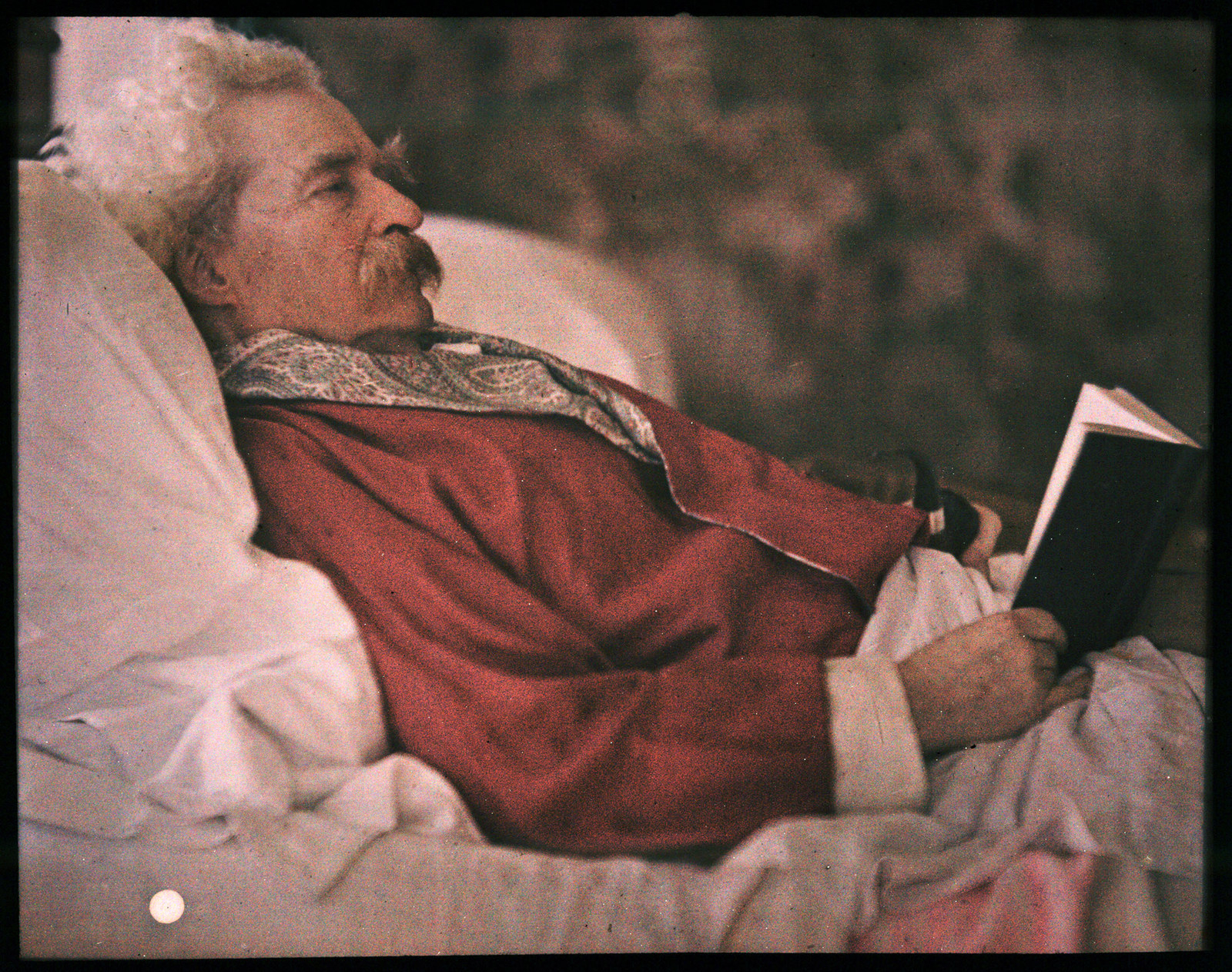
Autochrome portrait of Mark Twain, 1908.

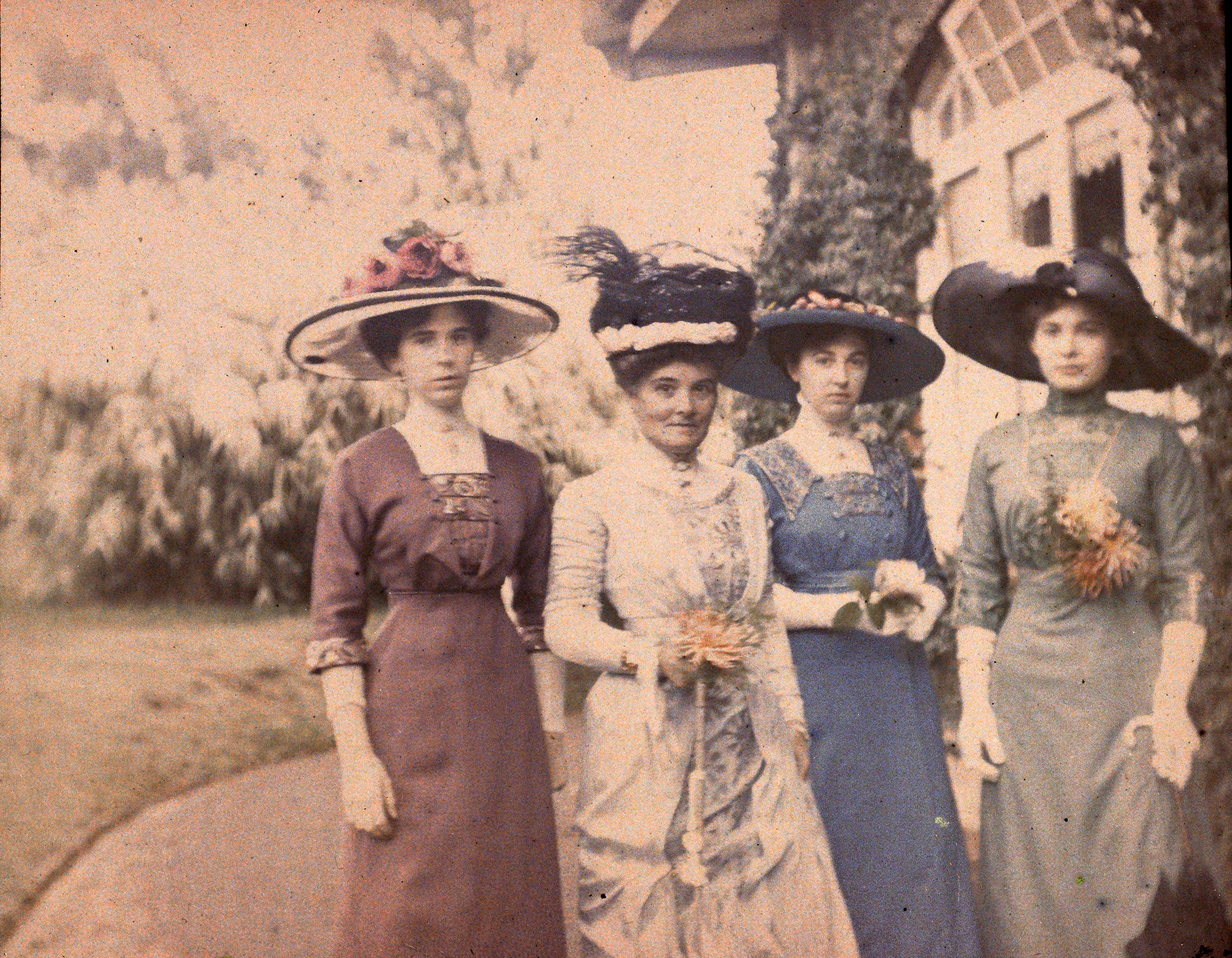
Gullick family, 1909

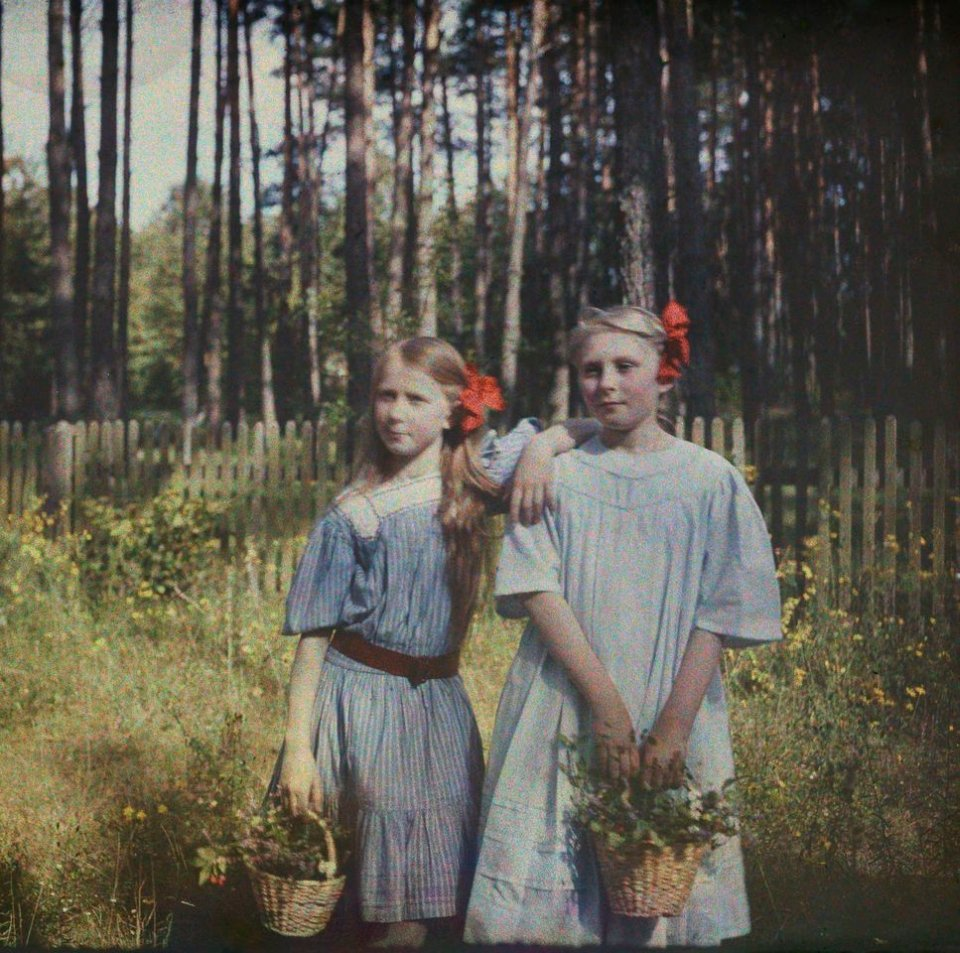
Anna Iwaszkiewicz and Maria Wysocka, Poland, 1909

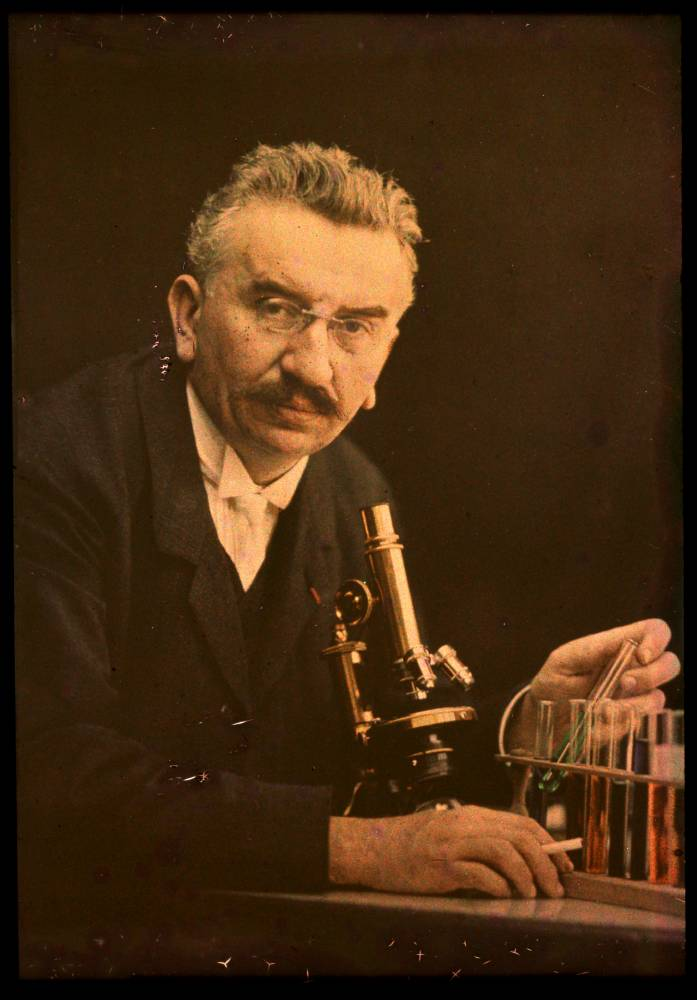
Louis Lumière, c. 1910

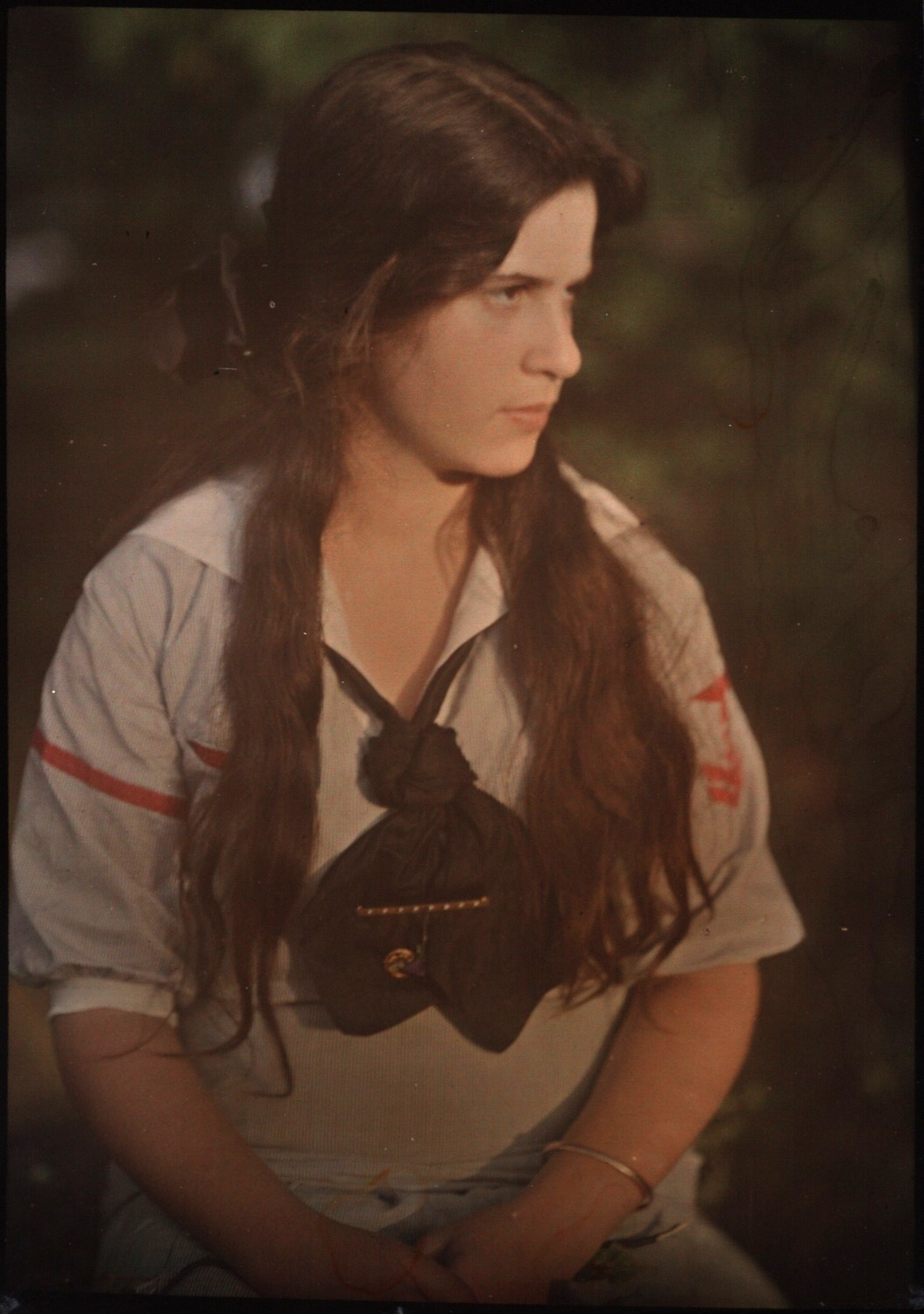
Katherine Stieglitz, c. 1910

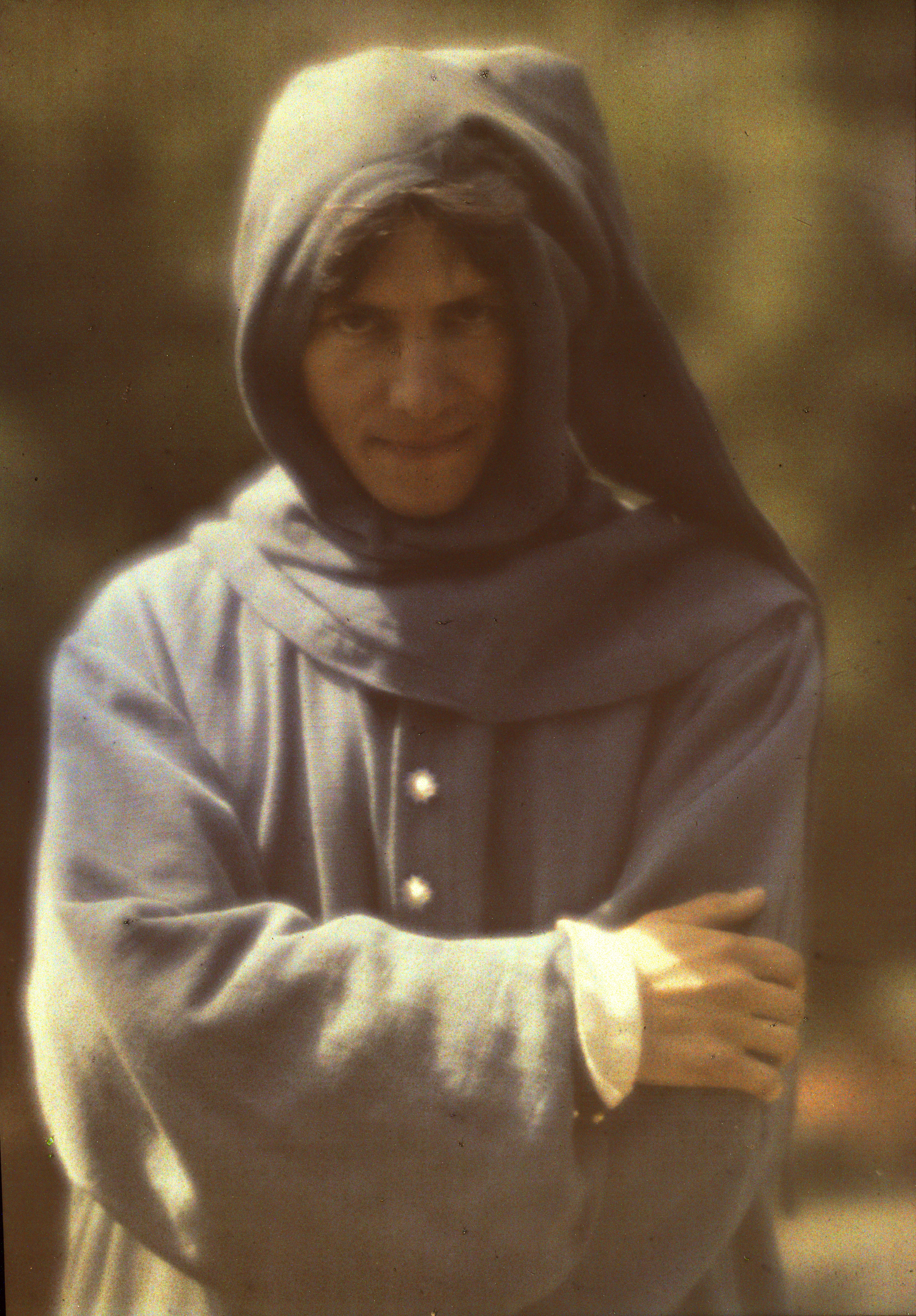
Autochrome of Percy MacKaye, photographed by Arnold Genthe in 1913

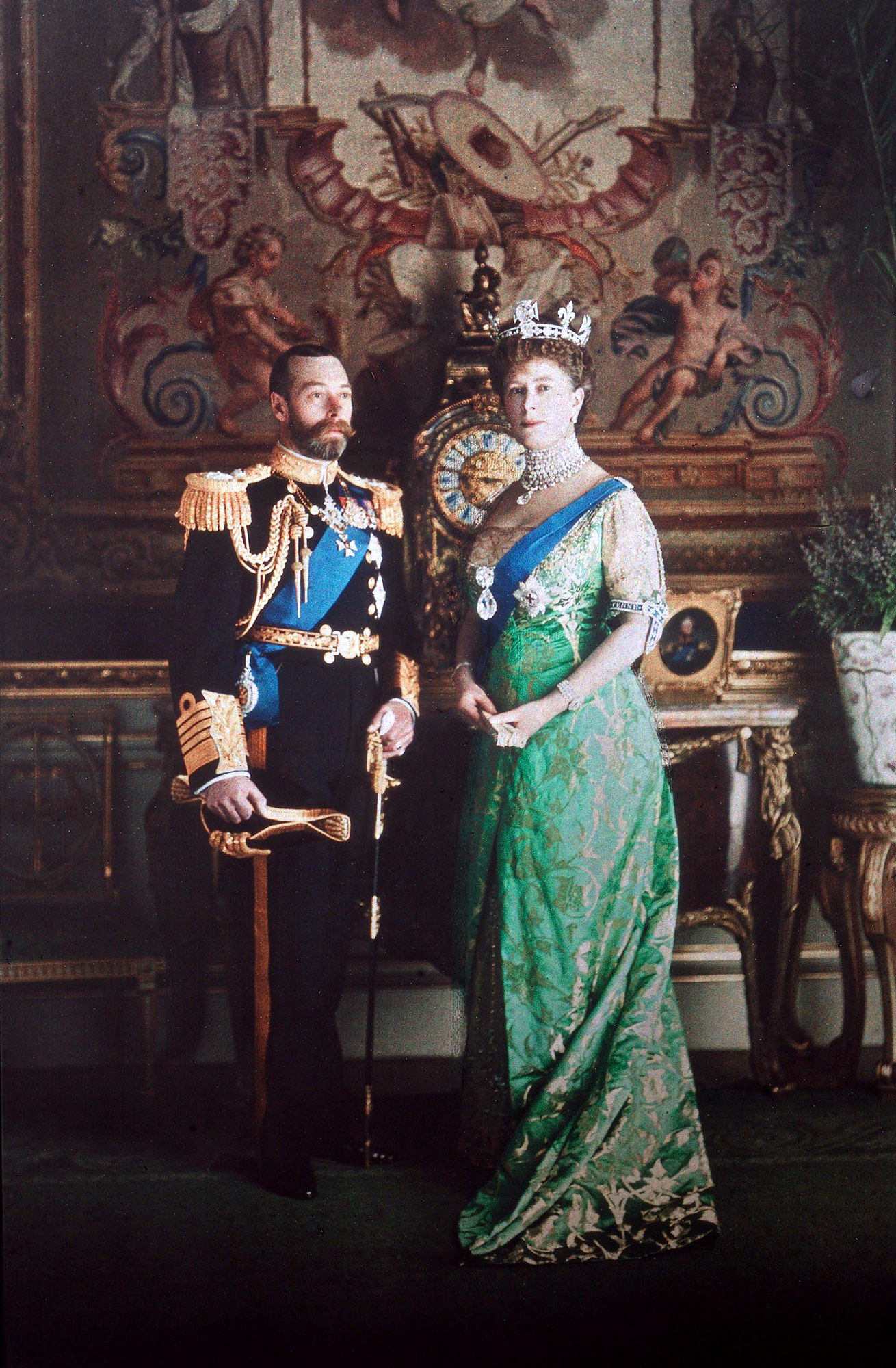
King George V and Queen Mary photographed by Jean Desboutin, 13 March 1914.

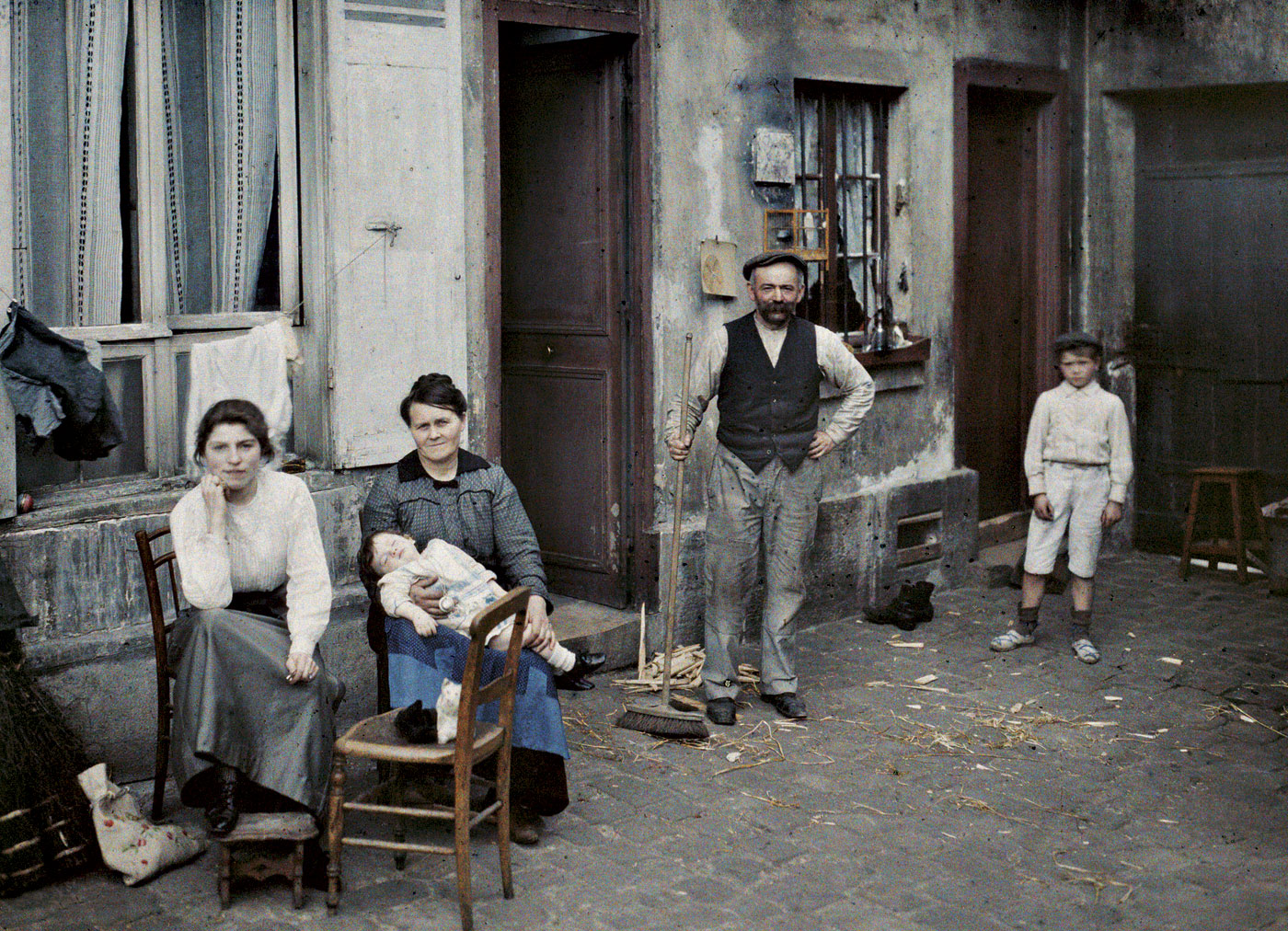
Family in Paris, 1914

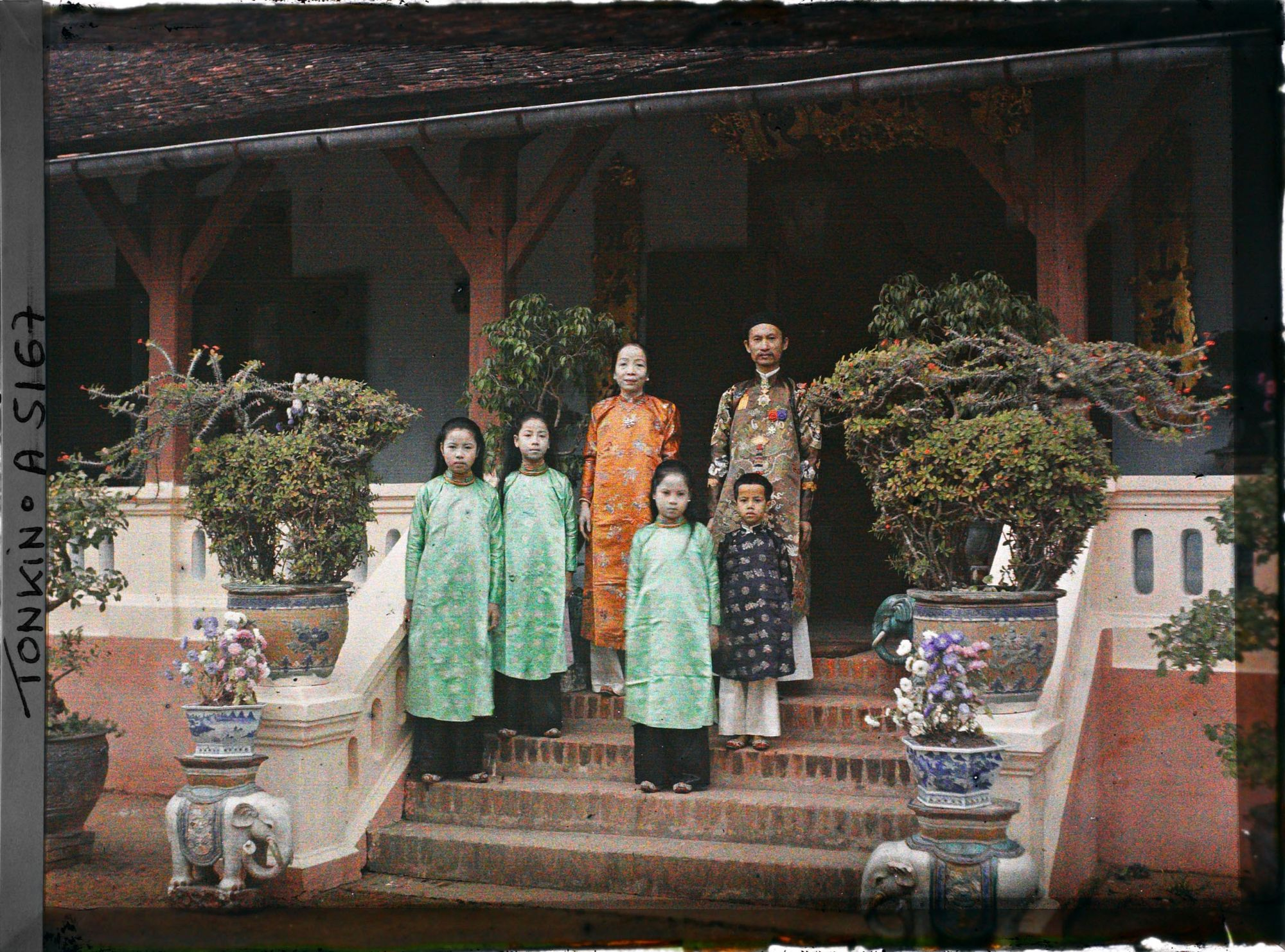
Hoang Trong Phu and his family, Vietnam, c. 1914.

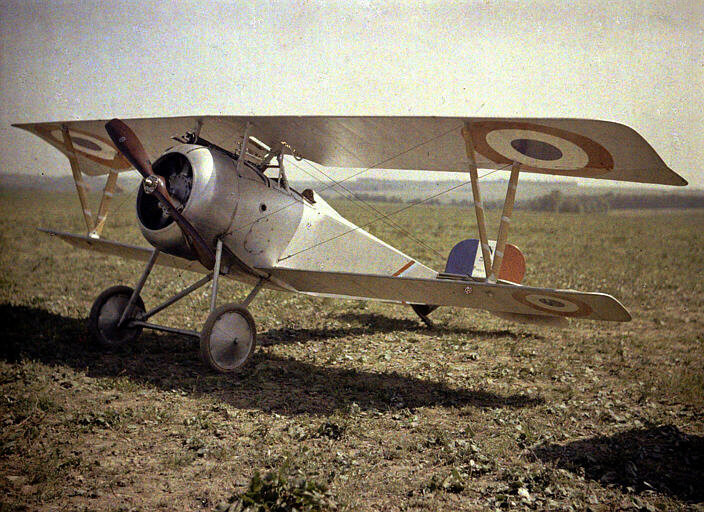
Nieuport 17 aircraft, 1917.

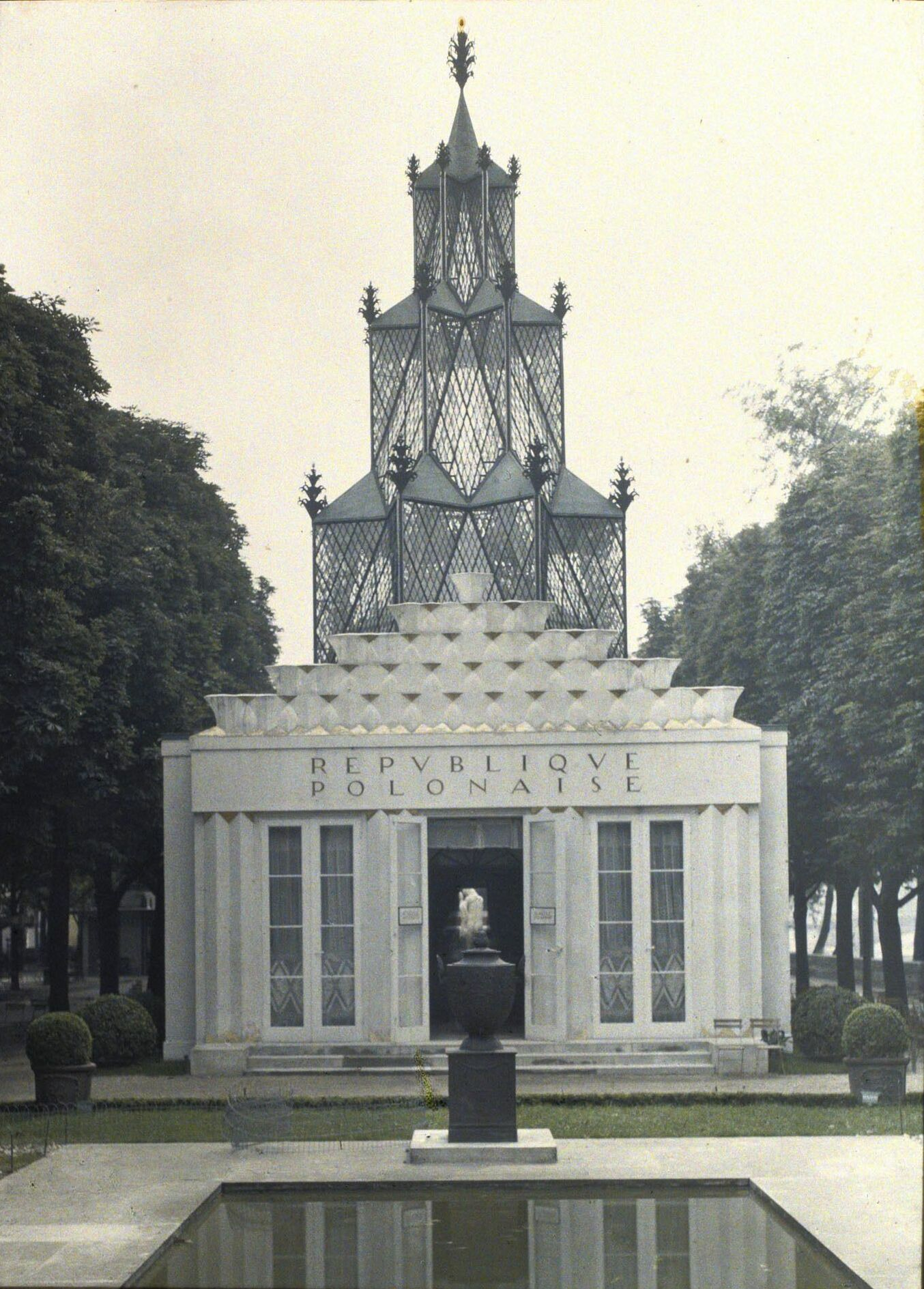
An Autochrome of the pavilion of Poland in Paris, 1925.

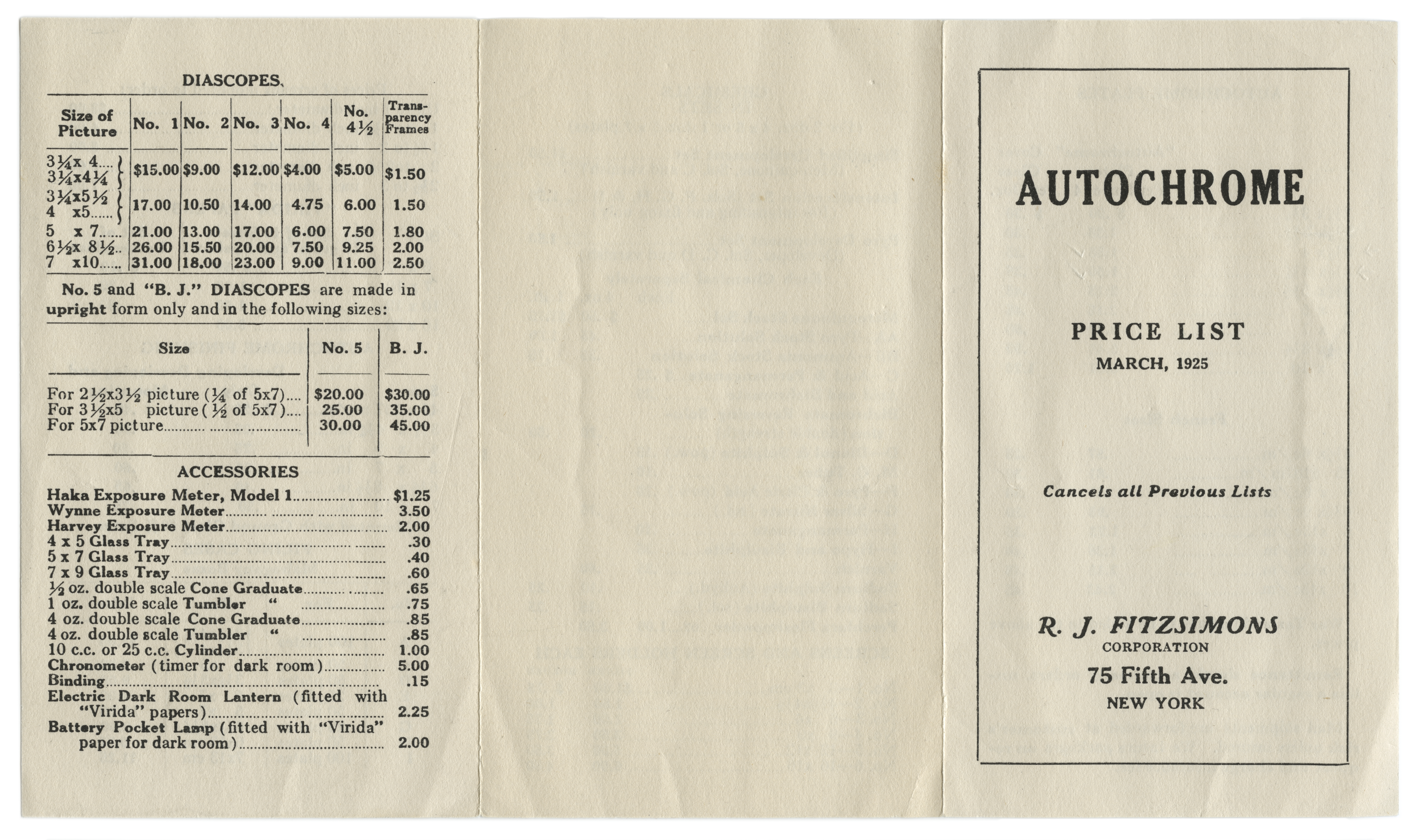
Autochrome Price List pamphlet, 1925 – front (scan)

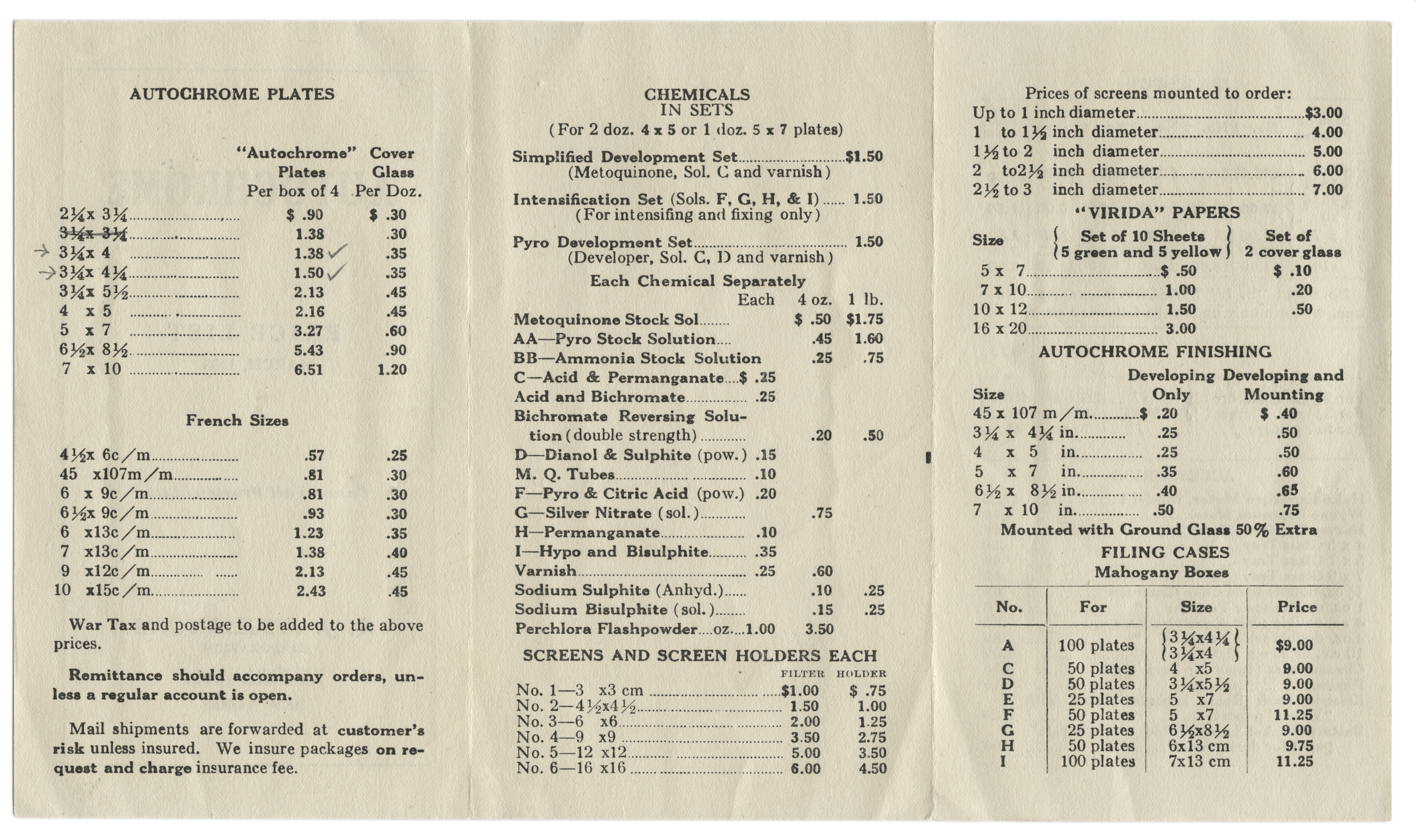
Autochrome Price List pamphlet, 1925 – reverse (scan)

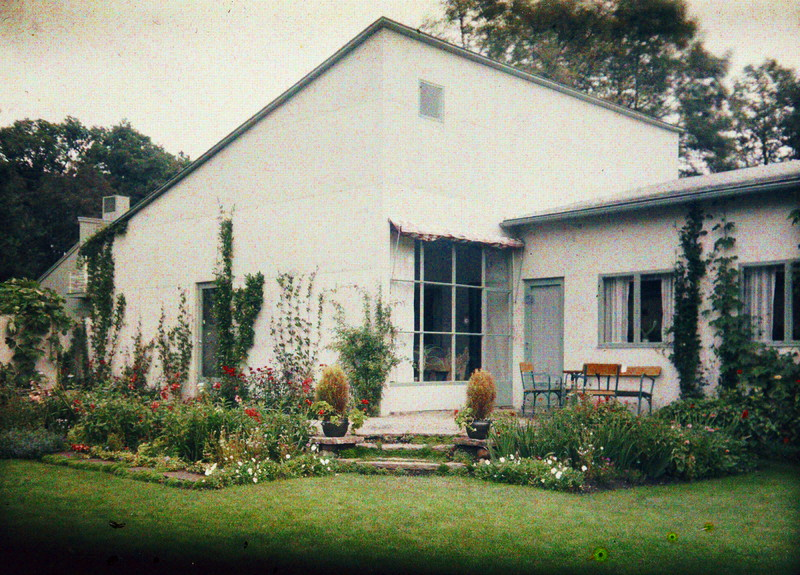
House in Stockholm, Autochrome, 1930.

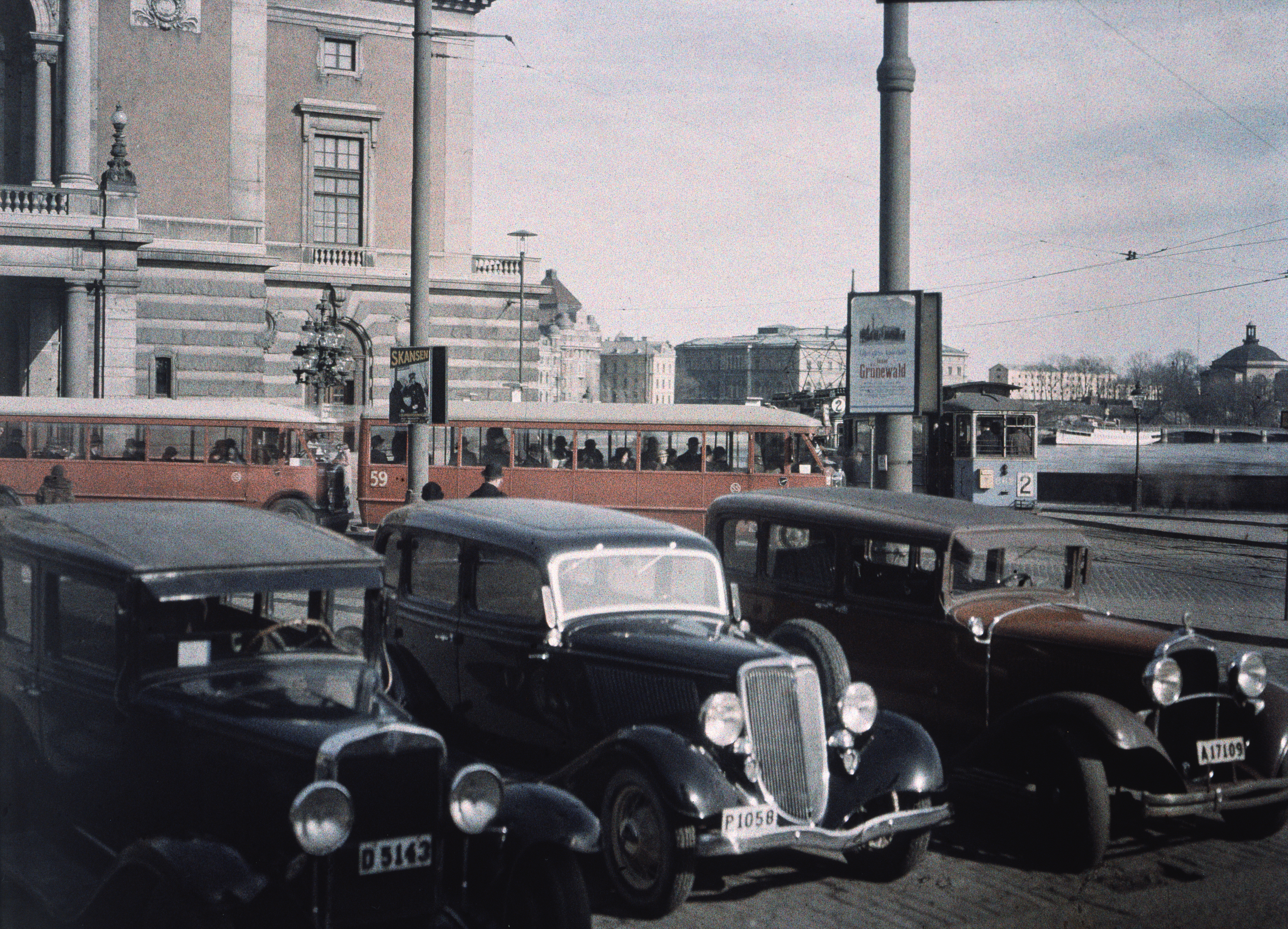
An Autochrome of the Royal Swedish Opera in Stockholm, Sweden, 1934.

== See also ==
- Dufaycolor, another early form of color photography
- Photochrom, a different kind of forerunner of color photography
- Sergey Prokudin-Gorsky, a pioneer of color photography
