= Stephen Pegler =

British industrialist (1852–1937)

Stephen Pegler (1852–1937) was a British industrialist and pioneer in the rubber industry, as well as a photographer. His early colour photographs (autochromes) are now kept in the Bassetlaw Museum in Retford, Nottinghamshire and are said to be the largest collection of Autochromes in the UK by one photographer.

== Personal life ==
Stephen Francis Pegler (1852-1937) was born in Bowdon, Cheshire, the son of Alfred Pegler, the founder of the Northern Rubber Company, and his wife Elizabeth Selina Pegler (nee Partridge). He had an older sister Josephine, and a younger brother Francis (Frank). In the 1861 census, Stephen was 8 years old and living with his father and mother, grandmother Susannah Oatavis Pegler 72, sister and brother in London, where his father was a foreign merchant. In the 1881 Census, he was 27 and living in Retford. He and his brother were working in the family business. In 1899 the brothers set up Pegler Brothers and Co.

He married Ethel Healey (1860–1886) but was widowed early. He had one child, Dorothy Ethel Pegler (1886–1939). The family lived at Grade II* Amcott House, Grove Street, Retford (now the site of Bassetlaw Museum). Stephen retired from business in 1907 and continued living with his mother and sister after his father's death. He was actively involved in Retford civic life, being mayor of the borough of East Retford on three occasions. He died in East Retford in 1937 at the age of 85.

He was the uncle of Alan Pegler.

== Photography ==
Stephen Pegler was a successful industrialist but is best known for his autochromes, a form of early colour photograph. His photographs date from around 1910 up to his death in the 1930s. They show everyday life in and around Retford including picnics, processions, outings, sports, gardens, interiors, shop windows, the markets, events at the Town Hall, farms and celebrations of national events. There are portraits of members of his family as well as other people such as Mr Snowden, the road-sweeper; a girl collecting milk; a pot-walloper in the Market Square; an ambulance team; members of the Corporation assembled to celebrate the 1911 coronation.

Pegler began taking photographs with a simple black and white camera before moving to a stereoscopic camera. In 1910, he became interested in the autochrome process in which he was to become a pioneer. In 1915 he became a Fellow of the Royal Photographic Society.

Pegler's photographic collection is now housed at the Bassetlaw Museum, which has over 800 Autochromes. It has been assembled from various sources, including a house in Bolham Lane, which had been bought by Pegler for his retired housekeeper. Later, money was raised to buy more of his photographs. Over 100 plates were bought in 2017. The Pegler collection held at Bassetlaw Museum is said to be the largest collections of autochromes by one photographer in the UK.

Some of his Autochromes are held in the Welbeck Estate collection, and some are owned by Burtons the Butchers. A few examples are

== Books ==
- A Colourful Past: The Autochromes of Stephen Pegler, Katherine Ashton and Derek Taylor, Bassetlaw Museum, 2010.
