= Bassetlaw Museum =

Museum in Retford, Nottinghamshire, England

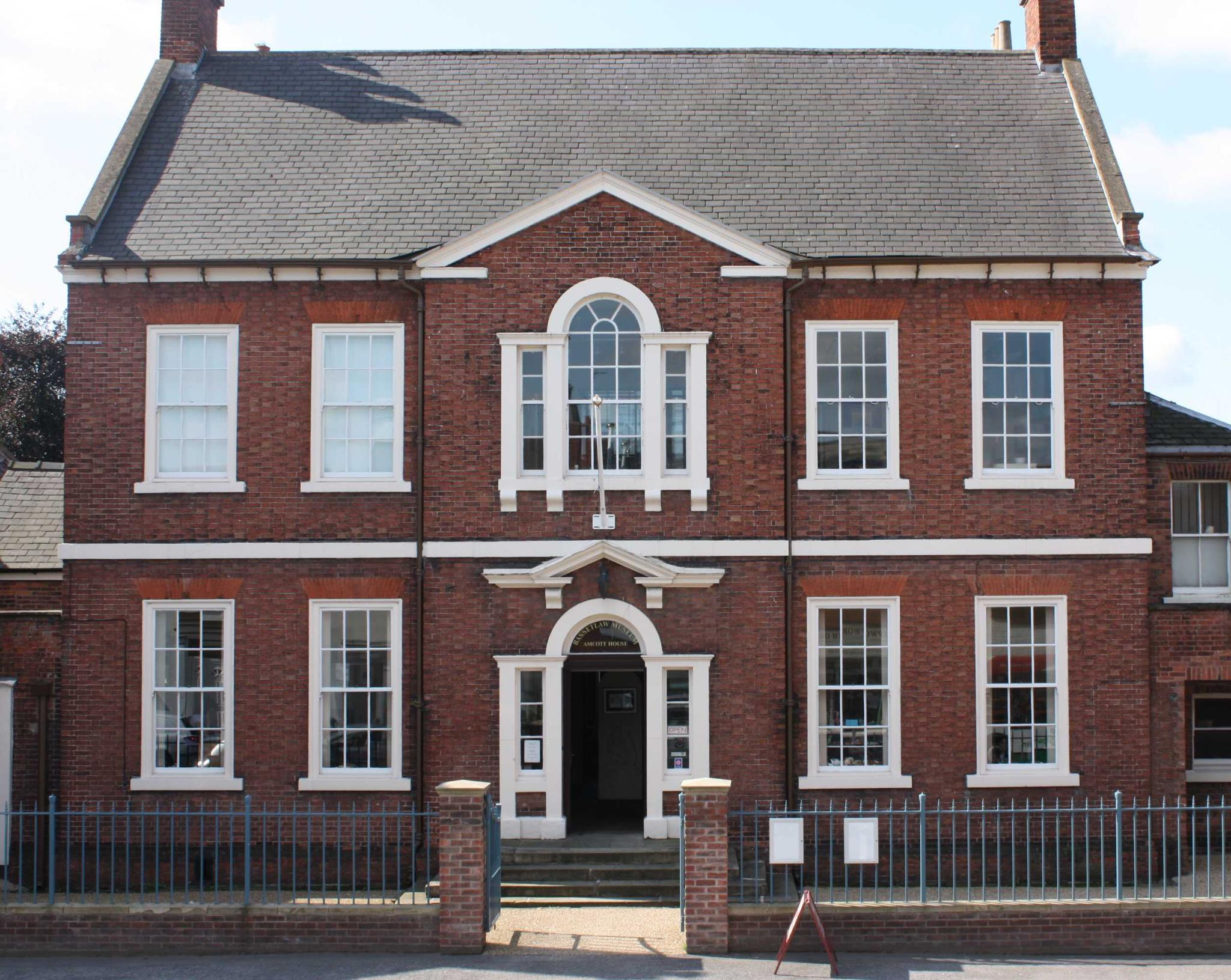
- Bassetlaw Museum

- Location within Nottinghamshire
- Former name: Amcott House
- Established: 1983
- Location: Retford, Nottinghamshire, England
- Coordinates: 53°19′20″N 0°56′22″W
- Website: bassetlawmuseum.org.uk

Listed Building – Grade II*
- Official name: Amcott House
- Designated: 14 September 1949
- Reference no.: 1178702

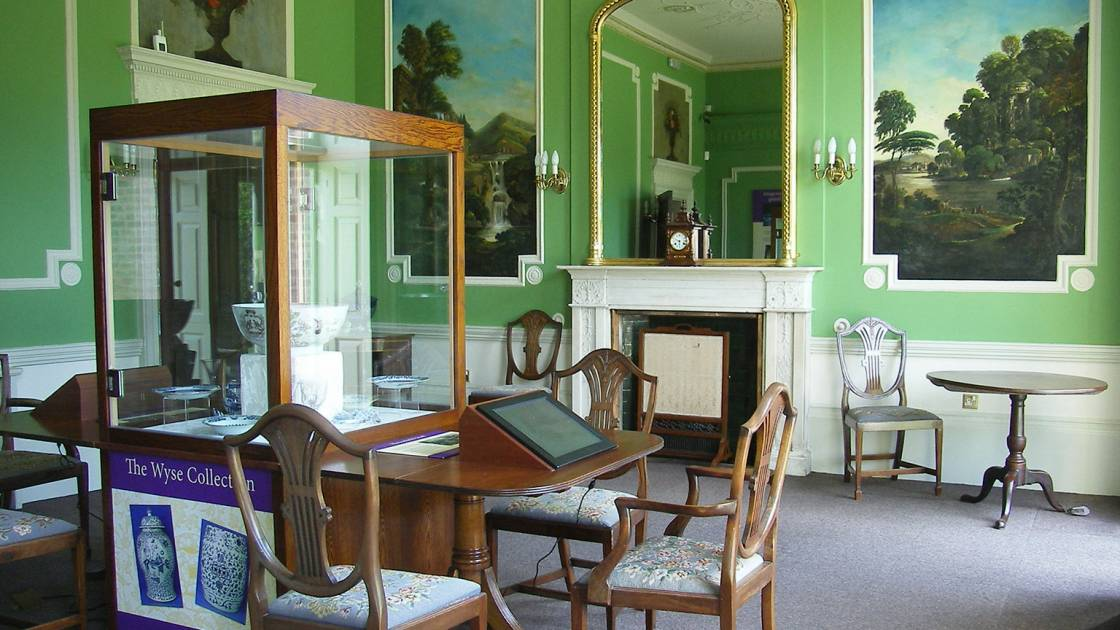
Bassetlaw Museum interior

The Bassetlaw Museum is a museum on Grove Street in Retford, Nottinghamshire, England. It documents the history of North Nottinghamshire from the earliest times to the present day.

== History ==
The Bassetlaw Museum was created in 1983 and has a number of collections donated by people in the local area. The collections include local history, archaeology, decorative and fine art, agriculture, costume and textiles. The museum is situated in the 18th-century Grade II* listed Amcott House on Grove Street, Retford where it moved in 1986. Admission to the museum is free.

== Collection highlights ==
- Art gallery - built in 1994 and partly financed by the Percy Laws Memorial Fund of the Rotary Club of Retford.
- Photography - comprising the 21,000 negatives known as the Welchman Collection, which were taken by professional photographers Edgar Welchman and Son of Grove Street, Retford between 1910 and 1960. The photograph collection at the museum also contains over 25,000 photographs of the towns and villages of North Nottinghamshire and people who lived there from about the 1850s onwards
- Carlton-in-Lindrick knight
- Anglo-Saxon log boat
- Autochromes by Stephen Pegler
- The Pilgrims Gallery - which opened in 2019 to commemorate the 400th anniversary of the Mayflower's voyage to America in 1620. The gallery features a recreation of William Brewster's study
- Rural Heritage Centre
- Costume

== Events and news ==
In July 2020, Bassetlaw Museum was the site of a community art project during the COVID-19 pandemic called 'The Retford Positivity Rock Snake'.

In September 2021, Bassetlaw Museum hosted an event welcoming members of the Wampanoag Nation for The Wampanoag Perspective Project, led by Bassetlaw District Council and funded by the Arts Council England and Nottinghamshire County Council. The cultural exchange project was aimed at hearing the Wampanoag perspective during the 400th year anniversary of the Mayflower sailing. The programme enabled primary-age pupils to learn about Native American culture, the shared Wampanoag-Bassetlaw history, and to watch the assembly of a Wetu in the grounds of the museum.

== Awards ==
- Bassetlaw Museum was voted the Nottinghamshire Museum of the Year in 2009
- In 2002 the Heritage Lottery Fund gave the museum a grant of £78,000 to enable the purchase and digitisation of the Welchman Collection
- In 2019 the museum was given £750,000—£450,000 by the Heritage Lottery Fund and the rest from local sources—to build the Pilgrim's Gallery

== See also ==
- Grade II* listed buildings in Nottinghamshire
- Listed buildings in Retford
